= Trade secret laws in the United States by state =

This is a summary of state trade secret law in the United States and its territories. Although many U.S. states have adopted the Uniform Trade Secrets Act (UTSA), each state is responsible for defining what constitutes a trade secret. This list draws on both statutory law and the case law interpreting it.

State	Statutory Provision	Elements	Key Cases
Alabama	Ala. Code. § 8-27-2(1)	There are six elements that need to be met: a. Is used or intended for use in a trade or business; b. Is included or embodied in a formula, pattern, compilation, computer software, drawing, device, method, technique, or process; c. Is not publicly known and is not generally known in the trade or business of the person asserting that it is a trade secret; d. Cannot be readily ascertained or derived from publicly available information; e. Is the subject of efforts that are reasonable under the circumstances to maintain its secrecy; and f. Has significant economic value.	Ex parte Miltope Corp., 823 So. 2d 640, 644–46 (Ala. 2001); Ex parte W.L. Halsey Grocery Co., 897 So. 2d 1028, 1034 (Ala. 2004); Movie Gallery US v. Greenshields, 648 F. Supp. 2d 1252, 1264 (M.D. Ala. 2009); Public Systems, Inc. v. Towry, 587 So. 2d 969, 972 (Ala. 1991)
Alaska	Alaska Stat. Ann. § 45.50.940(3)	(3) "trade secret" means information that (A) derives independent economic value, actual or potential, from not being generally known to, and not being readily ascertainable by proper means by, other persons who can obtain economic value from its disclosure or use; and (B) is the subject of efforts that are reasonable under the circumstances to maintain its secrecy.	State Dept. of Nat. Resources v. Arctic Slope Reg'l Corp., 834 P.2d 134, 139 (Alaska 1991) (the data obtained by the oil companies from the KIC well constituted a trade secret because the value of the data depended on its secrecy and the companies clearly attempted to maintain its secrecy)
Arizona	Ariz. Rev. Stat. § 44-401	"Trade secret" means information, including a formula, pattern, compilation, program, device, method, technique or process, that both: (a) Derives independent economic value, actual or potential, from not being generally known to, and not being readily ascertainable by proper means by, other persons who can obtain economic value from its disclosure or use. (b) Is the subject of efforts that are reasonable under the circumstances to maintain its secrecy	Enter. Leasing Co. v. Ehmke (the trade secret must not be known naturally by individuals within the area of business); W. L. Gore & Assocs. v. GI Dynamics, Inc. (not a trade secret if the information has been disclosed in a public domain such as a patent application)
Arkansas	A.C.A. § 4-75-601(4)	Information qualifies as a trade secret if it is a compilation or process which derives economic value from being generally unknown and is subject to reasonable confidentiality efforts.	Weigh Sys. South v. Mark's Scales & Equipment (2002) (whether information is a trade secret depends on: the extent to which information is known outside the business and within the business, measures to guard secrecy, economic value of the information, effort in developing information, and ease at which information could be duplicated); Vigoro Indus. v. Crisp (1996); Coenco, Inc. v. Coenco Sales, Inc. (1991) (information that is readily ascertainable to the public does not qualify for trade secret designation, even if there were efforts to keep potentially valuable confidential); Allen v. Johar, Inc. (1992) (customer lists generally constitute trade secrets)
California	Cal. Civ. Code § 3426.1	"Trade secret" means information, including a formula, pattern, compilation, program, device, method, technique, or process, that: (1) Derives independent economic value, actual or potential, from not being generally known to the public or to other persons who can obtain economic value from its disclosure or use; and (2) Is the subject of efforts that are reasonable under the circumstances to maintain its secrecy.	MAI Sys. Corp. v. Peak Computer, Inc., 991 F.2d 511 (9th Cir. 1993) (plaintiff's database was a trade secret as it had potential economic value since it allowed a competitor to direct its sales efforts to those potential customers already using the MAI computer system; MAI also took reasonable steps to insure the secrecy of the information requiring employees to sign confidentiality agreements)
Colorado	C.R.S. § 7-74-102	"Trade secret" means the whole or any portion or phase of any scientific or technical information, design, process, procedure, formula, improvement, confidential business or financial information, listing of names, addresses, or telephone numbers, or other information relating to any business or profession which is secret and of value. To be a "trade secret" the owner thereof must have taken measures to prevent the secret from becoming available to persons other than those selected by the owner to have access thereto for limited purposes.	Rumnock v. Anschultz, 2016 CO 77 (plaintiff's documents did not meet the confidentiality requirement for trade secret status because there was no evidence of any efforts to keep the documents confidential); Gognat v. Ellsworth, 259 P.3d 497 (the term "trade secret" refers to one complete asset, meaning that individual pieces of a compilation are not separate trade secrets)
Connecticut	Con. Gen. Stat. § 35–51(d)	A trade secret is a formula, pattern, compilation, program, device, method, technique, process, drawing, cost data, or customer list that "(1) derives independent economic value, actual or potential, from not being generally known to, and not being readily ascertainable by proper means by, other persons who can obtain economic value from its disclosure or use, and (2) is the subject of efforts that are reasonable under the circumstances to maintain its secrecy."	Smith v. Snyder, 839 A.2d 589, 463 (Conn. 2004)
Delaware	Del. Code Ann. § 2001(4)	"Trade secret" shall mean information, including a formula, pattern, compilation, program, device, method, technique or process, that: a. Derives independent economic value, actual or potential, from not being generally known to, and not being readily ascertainable by proper means by, other persons who can obtain economic value from its disclosure or use; and b. Is the subject of efforts that are reasonable under the circumstances to maintain its secrecy.	Dow Chemical Canada Inc. v. HRD Corp., 909 F.Supp.2d 340 (2012); AlixPartners, LLP v. Benichou, 250 A.3d 775 (2019)
Florida	Fla. Stat. Ann. § 688.002	"Trade secret" means information, including a formula, pattern, compilation, program, device, method, technique, or process that: (a) Derives independent economic value, actual or potential, from not being generally known to, and not being readily ascertainable by proper means by, other persons who can obtain economic value from its disclosure or use; and (b) Is the subject of efforts that are reasonable under the circumstances to maintain its secrecy.	Yellowfin Yachts, Inc. v. Barker Boatworks, LLC, 898 F. 3d 1279, 1299 (11th Cir. 2018)
Georgia	Ga. Code Ann. § 10-1-761(4)	(1) technical or nontechnical data, a formula, a pattern, a compilation, a program, a device, a method, a technique, a drawing, a process, financial data, financial plans, product plans, or a list of actual or potential customers or suppliers (2) not commonly known by or available to the public (3) Derives economic value, actual or potential, from not being generally known to, and not being readily ascertainable by proper means by, other persons who can obtain economic value from its disclosure or use (4) Is the subject of efforts that are reasonable under the circumstances to maintain its secrecy	Penalty Kick Mgt. Ltd. v. Coca-Cola Co., 318 F.3d 1284, 1291 (11th Cir. 2003);Camp Creek Hosp. Inns, Inc. v. Sheraton Fran. Corp., 139 F.3d 1396, 1411 (11th Cir. 1998)
Hawaii	Haw. Rev. Stat. Ann. § 482B-2	"Trade secret" means information, including a formula, pattern, compilation, program device, method, technique, or process that: (1) Derives independent economic value, actual or potential, from not being generally known to, and not being readily ascertainable by proper means by, other persons who can obtain economic value from its disclosure or use; and (2) Is the subject of efforts that are reasonable under the circumstances to maintain its secrecy.	
Idaho	Idaho Code § 48-801	Information is a "trade secret" if it (a). derives economic value from (b.) not being generally known by others that could make economic use of it and (c.) not being readily and properly ascertainable by others that could make economic use of it, as well as (d.) being subject to reasonable efforts to maintain its secrecy.	Basic Am. v. Shatila, 133 Idaho 726 (Idaho 1999)
Illinois	765 Ill. Comp. Stat. Ann. 1065/2	(d) "Trade secret" means information, including but not limited to, technical or non-technical data, a formula, pattern, compilation, program, device, method, technique, drawing, process, financial data, or list of actual or potential customers or suppliers, that: (1) is sufficiently secret to derive economic value, actual or potential, from not being generally known to other persons who can obtain economic value from its disclosure or use; and (2) is the subject of efforts that are reasonable under the circumstances to maintain its secrecy or confidentiality.	
Indiana	Ind. Code § 24-2-3-2	"Trade secret" means information, including a formula, pattern, compilation, program, device, method, technique, or process, that: (1) derives independent economic value, actual or potential, from not being generally known to, and not being readily ascertainable by proper means by, other persons who can obtain economic value from its disclosure or use; and (2) is the subject of efforts that are reasonable under the circumstances to maintain its secrecy.	
Iowa	Iowa Code Ann. § 550	"Trade secret" means information, including but not limited to a formula, pattern, compilation, program, device, method, technique, or process that is both of the following elements: a. Derives independent economic value, actual or potential, from not being generally known to, and not being readily ascertainable by proper means by a person able to obtain economic value from its disclosure or use. b. Is the subject of efforts that are reasonable under the circumstances to maintain its secrecy.	
Kansas	K.S.A. § 60-3320(4)	i) economic value; ii) not generally known; iii) not readily ascertainable by proper means; iv) by others who can obtain economic value from its disclosure or use, iv) subject of efforts that are reasonable under the circumstances	Fireworks Spectacular, Inc. v. Premier Pyrotechnics, Inc., 147 F. Supp. 2d 1057 (D. Kan. 2001); DSMC, Inc. v. Convera Corp., 479 F. Supp. 2d 68 (D.D.C. 2007)
Kentucky	Ky. Rev. Stat. Ann. § 365.880	"Trade secret" means information, including a formula, pattern, compilation, program, data, device, method, technique, or process, that: (a) Derives independent economic value, actual or potential, from not being generally known to, and not being readily ascertainable by proper means by, other persons who can obtain economic value from its disclosure or use, and (b) Is the subject of efforts that are reasonable under the circumstances to maintain its secrecy.	Alph C. Kaufman, Inc. v. Cornerstone Indus. Corp., 540 S.W.3d 803 (Ky. Ct. App. 2017); Insight Kentucky Partners II, L.P. v. Preferred Auto. Servs., Inc., 514 S.W.3d 537 (Ky. Ct. App. 2016)
Louisiana	La. Stat. Ann. § 1431(4)	(a) derives independent economic value, actual or potential, from not being generally known to and not being readily ascertainable by proper means by other persons who can obtain economic value from its disclosure or use, and (b) is the subject of efforts that are reasonable under the circumstances to maintain its secrecy.	Innovative Manpower Sols., LLC v. Ironman Staffing, LLC, 929 F. Supp. 2d 597, (W.D. La. 2013); Johnson Controls, Inc. v. Guidry, W.D.La.2010, 724 F.Supp.2d 612.; CheckPoint Fluidic Systems Intern., Ltd. v. Guccione, E.D.La.2012, 888 F.Supp.2d 780.
Maine	Me. Stat. tit. 10, § 1542	Trade secret. "Trade secret" means information, including, but not limited to, a formula, pattern, compilation, program, device, method, technique or process, that: A. Derives independent economic value, actual or potential, from not being generally known to and not being readily ascertainable by proper means by other persons who can obtain economic value from its disclosure or use; and B. Is the subject of efforts that are reasonable under the circumstances to maintain its secrecy.	Blue Sky W., LLC v. Maine Revenue Servs., 2019 ME 137 (Me. 2019); Spottiswoode v. Levine, 1999 ME 79 (Me. 1999)
Maryland	Md. Code Ann., Com. Law § 11-1201	Information, which includes "a formula, pattern, compilation, program, device, method, technique, or process" must meet a two-element test: "(1) Derives independent economic value, actual or potential, from not being generally known to, and not being readily ascertainable by proper means by, other persons who can obtain economic value from its disclosure or use; and "(2) Is the subject of efforts that are reasonable under the circumstances to maintain its secrecy."	AirFacts, Inc. v. de Amezaga, 909 F.3d 84 (4th Cir. 2018); Brightview Grp., LP v. Teeters, 441 F. Supp. 3d 115 (D. Md. 2020); RaceRedi Motorsports, LLC v. Dart Mach., Ltd., 640 F. Supp. 2d 660 (D. Md. 2009)
Massachusetts	Mass. Gen. Laws Ann. ch. 93, § 42	"Trade secret", specified or specifiable information, whether or not fixed in tangible form or embodied in any tangible thing, including but not limited to a formula, pattern, compilation, program, device, method, technique, process, business strategy, customer list, invention, or scientific, technical, financial or customer data that (i) at the time of the alleged misappropriation, provided economic advantage, actual or potential, from not being generally known to, and not being readily ascertainable by proper means by, others who might obtain economic advantage from its acquisition, disclosure or use; and (ii) at the time of the alleged misappropriation was the subject of efforts that were reasonable under the circumstances, which may include reasonable notice, to protect against it being acquired, disclosed or used without the consent of the person properly asserting rights therein or such person's predecessor in interest.	
Michigan	Mich. Comp. Laws § 445.1902	(d) "Trade secret" means information, including a formula, pattern, compilation, program, device, method, technique, or process, that is both of the following: (i) Derives independent economic value, actual or potential, from not being generally known to, and not being readily ascertainable by proper means by, other persons who can obtain economic value from its disclosure or use. (ii) Is the subject of efforts that are reasonable under the circumstances to maintain its secrecy."	Prudential Defense Solutions, Inc. v. Graham, 498 F.Supp.3d 928 (E.D. Mich. 2020)
Minnesota	Minn. Stat. § 325c	"Trade secret" means information, including a formula, pattern, compilation, program, device, method, technique, or process, that: (i) derives independent economic value, actual or potential, from not being generally known to, and not being readily ascertainable by proper means by, other persons who can obtain economic value from its disclosure or use, and (ii) is the subject of efforts that are reasonable under the circumstances to maintain its secrecy.	Prairie Field Servs., LLC v. Welsh, 497 F.Supp 3d 381 (D. Minn. 2020) ("The DTSA and MUTSA define a ‘trade secret’ as ‘information’ that ‘(1) is not generally known or readily ascertainable, (2) has value as a result of its secrecy, and (3) is the subject of reasonable efforts under the circumstances to protect its secrecy.")
Mississippi	Miss. Code Ann. § 75-26-3(d)(i–ii)	(d) "Trade secret" means information, including a formula, pattern, compilation, program, device, method, technique or process, that: (i) Derives independent economic value, actual or potential, from not being generally known to, and not being readily ascertainable by proper means by, other persons who can obtain economic value from its disclosure or use, and (ii) Is the subject of efforts that are reasonable under the circumstances to maintain its secrecy.	
Missouri	Mo. Ann. Stat. § 417.450	"Trade secret", information, including but not limited to, technical or nontechnical data, a formula, pattern, compilation, program, device, method, technique, or process, that: (a) Derives independent economic value, actual or potential, from not being generally known to, and not being readily ascertainable by proper means by other persons who can obtain economic value from its disclosure or use; and (b) Is the subject of efforts that are reasonable under the circumstances to maintain its secrecy.	Central Trust and Inv. Co. v. Signalpoint Asset Management, LLC; Whelan Sec. Co. v. Kennebrew; Western Blue Print Co., LLC v. Roberts
Montana	Mont. Code Ann. § 30-14-402	Montana's Uniform Trade Secrets Act defines a "trade secret" as information or computer software, including a formula, pattern, compilation, program, device, method, technique, or process, that: (a) derives independent economic value, actual or potential, from not being generally known to and not being readily ascertainable by proper means by other person who can obtain economic value for its disclosure or use; and (b) is the subject of efforts that are reasonable under the circumstances to maintain its secrecy.	Great Falls Trib. v. Mont. Pub. Serv. Comm'n, 82 P.3d 786 (Mont. 2003); Mont. Silversmiths, Inc. v. Taylor Brands, LLC, 850 F.Supp.2d 1172 (D. Mont. 2012)
Nebraska	Neb. Rev. Stat. Ann § 87-502(4)	Nebraska's Trade Secrets Act defines a trade secret as information, including, but not limited to, a drawing, formula, pattern, compilation, program, device, method, technique, code, or process that: (a) Derives independent economic value, actual or potential, from not being known to, and not being ascertainable by proper means by, other persons who can obtain economic value from its disclosure or use; and (b) Is the subject of efforts that are reasonable under the circumstances to maintain its secrecy.	First Express Servs. Group v. Easter, 286 Neb. 912 (2013)
Nevada	Nev. Rev. Stat. § 600A.030	"Trade secret": (a) Means information, including, without limitation, a formula, pattern, compilation, program, device, method, technique, product, system, process, design, prototype, procedure, computer programming instruction or code that: (1) Derives independent economic value, actual or potential, from not being generally known to, and not being readily ascertainable by proper means by the public or any other persons who can obtain commercial or economic value from its disclosure or use; and (2) Is the subject of efforts that are reasonable under the circumstances to maintain its secrecy. (b) Does not include any information that a manufacturer is required to report pursuant to NRS 439B.635 or 439B.640, information that a pharmaceutical sales representative is required to report pursuant to NRS 439B.660, information that a pharmacy benefit manager is required to report pursuant to NRS 439B.645 or information that a wholesaler is required to report pursuant to NRS 439B.642, to the extent that such information is required to be disclosed by those sections.	Finkel v. Cashman Professional, Inc., 128 Nev. 68, 74 (Nev. 2012)
New Hampshire	N.H. Rev. Stat. Ann. § 350-B:1	"Trade secret" means information, including a formula, pattern, compilation, program, device, method, technique, or process, that: (a) Derives independent economic value, actual or potential, from not being generally known to, and not being readily ascertainable by proper means by, other persons who can obtain economic value from its disclosure or use; and (b) Is the subject of efforts that are reasonable under the circumstances to maintain its secrecy.	Beane v. Beane, 856 F. Supp. 2d 280 (D.N.H. 2012); Mortg. Specialists, Inc. v. Davey, 153 N.H. 764, 904 A.2d 652 (2006)
New Jersey	N.J. Stat. Ann. § 56:15-2	"Trade secret" means information, held by one or more people, without regard to form, including a formula, pattern, business data compilation, program, device, method, technique, design, diagram, drawing, invention, plan, procedure, prototype or process, that: (1) Derives independent economic value, actual or potential, from not being generally known to, and not being readily ascertainable by proper means by, other persons who can obtain economic value from its disclosure or use; and (2) Is the subject of efforts that are reasonable under the circumstances to maintain its secrecy.	Lasch v. Koperweis, No. A-4352-17T1, 2019 WL 2317166, at *4 (N.J. Super. Ct. App. Div. May 31, 2019) Intech Powercore Corp. v. Albert Handtmann Elteka GmbH & Co. KG, No. CV 14–05508, 2021 WL 1138124, at *6 (D.N.J. March 24, 2021)
New Mexico	N.M. Stat. Ann. § 57-3A-2	"trade secret" means information, including a formula, pattern, compilation, program, device, method, technique or process, that: (1) derives independent economic value, actual or potential, from not being generally known to and not being readily ascertainable by proper means by other persons who can obtain economic value from its disclosure or use; and (2) is the subject of efforts that are reasonable under the circumstances to maintain its secrecy.	Rapid Temps, Inc. v. Lamon, 2008, 144 N.M. 804, 192 P.3d 799; Insure New Mexico, LLC v. McGonigle, 2000, 128 N.M. 611, P.2d 1053
New York	New York does not have any statutes pertaining to trade secrets. New York is only one of two states that have not adopted the Uniform Trade Secrets Act. Instead, New York trade secret protection is governed by the common law.	A trade secret is any “formula, pattern, device or compilation of information which is used in one’s business, and which gives [the employer] an opportunity to obtain an advantage over competitors who do not know or use it.” "New York courts typically consider the following factors in determining whether there is a trade secret: (1) the extent to which the information is known outside of the business; (2) the extent to which it is known by employees and others involved in the business; (3) the extent of measures taken by the business to guard the secrecy of the information; (4) the value of the information to the business and its competitors; (5) the amount of effort or money expended by the business in developing the information; (6) the ease or difficulty with which the information could be properly acquired or duplicated by others."	Ashland Mgmt. v. Janien, 82 N.Y.2d 395, 407 (N.Y. 1993)
North Carolina	N.C. Gen. Stat. § 66–152(3)	"Trade secret" means business or technical information, including but not limited to a formula, pattern, program, device, compilation of information, method, technique, or process that: a. Derives independent actual or potential commercial value from not being generally known or readily ascertainable through independent development or reverse engineering by persons who can obtain economic value from its disclosure or use; and b. Is the subject of efforts that are reasonable under the circumstances to maintain its secrecy.	Spirax Sarco, Inc. v. SSI Eng’g, Inc., 122 F.Supp.3d 406 (E.D. N.C. 2015); RLM Commc’ns, Inc. v. Tuschen, 66 F.Supp.3d 681 (E.D. N.C. 2014); Philips Elecs. N. Am. Corp. v. Hope, 631 F.Supp.2d 705 (M.D. N.C. 2009)
North Dakota	N.D.C.C. 47–25.1-01	A "Trade secret" is information such as a formula, pattern, compilation, program, device, method, technique, or process, that: 1. Derives actual or potential independent economic value from not being generally known to, and not being readily ascertainable by proper means by, other persons who can obtain economic value from its disclosure or use; and 2. Is subject to reasonable efforts under the circumstances to maintain its secrecy.	
Ohio	Ohio Rev. Code Ann. § 1333.61(D)	(D) "Trade secret" means information, including the whole or any portion or phase of any scientific or technical information, design, process, procedure, formula, pattern, compilation, program, device, method, technique, or improvement, or any business information or plans, financial information, or listing of names, addresses, or telephone numbers, that satisfies both of the following: (1) It derives independent economic value, actual or potential, from not being generally known to, and not being readily ascertainable by proper means by, other persons who can obtain economic value from its disclosure or use. (2) It is the subject of efforts that are reasonable under the circumstances to maintain its secrecy.	Sheil v. Horton, 117 N.E.3d 194, 205 (Ohio Ct. App. 2018); Salemi v. Cleveland Metroparks, 49 N.E.3d 1296, 1302 (Ohio 2016); State ex. rel. The Plain Dealer v. Ohio Dept. of Ins., 687 N.E.2d 661, 672 (Ohio 1997)
Oklahoma	78 Okl. St. Ann § 86	"Trade secret" means information, including a formula, pattern, compilation, program, device, method, technique or process, that: a. derives independent economic value, actual or potential, from not being generally known to, and not being readily ascertainable by proper means by, other persons who can obtain economic value from its disclosure or use, and b. is the subject of efforts that are reasonable under the circumstances to maintain its secrecy.	Sw. Stainless, L.P. v. Sappington, 582 F.Supp.3d 1176 (10th Cir. 2009); Micro Consulting, Inc. v. Zubeldia, 813 F.Supp. 1514 (W.D. Okla. 1990); ProLine Products, L.L.C. v. McBride, 324 P.3d 430 (Civ. App. Okla. 2014)
Oregon	O.R.S § 646.461	1) Independent economic value from not being generally known to the public; 2) subject of reasonable efforts to maintain its secrecy	Western Medical Consultants, Inc. v. Johnson (1996); Smith v. Healy (2010), IKON Office Solutions, Inc. v. American Office Products, Inc. (2001); Dial Temporary Help Service, Inc. v. Shrock (1996); Hart Enterprises, Inc. v. Chia (1992)
Pennsylvania	12 Pa. C.S. Ann. § 5302	"Trade secret." —Information, including a formula, drawing, pattern, compilation including a customer list, program, device, method, technique or process that: (1) Derives independent economic value, actual or potential, from not being generally known to, and not being readily ascertainable by proper means by, other persons who can obtain economic value from its disclosure or use. (2) Is the subject of efforts that are reasonable under the circumstances to maintain its secrecy.	
Rhode Island	R.I. Gen. Laws § 6-41-1	(4) "Trade secret" means information, including a formula, pattern, compilation, program, device, method, technique, or process, that: (i) Derives independent economic value, actual or potential, from not being generally known to, and not being readily ascertainable by proper means by, other persons who can obtain economic value from its disclosure or use; and (ii) Is the subject of efforts that are reasonable under the circumstances to maintain its secrecy.	
South Carolina	S.C. Code Ann. § 39-8-20	5) "Trade secret" means: (a) information including, but not limited to, a formula, pattern, compilation, program, device, method, technique, product, system, or process, design, prototype, procedure, or code that: (i) derives independent economic value, actual or potential, from not being generally known to, and not being readily ascertainable by proper means by the public or any other person who can obtain economic value from its disclosure or use, and (ii) is the subject of efforts that are reasonable under the circumstances to maintain its secrecy. (b) A trade secret may consist of a simple fact, item, or procedure, or a series or sequence of items or procedures which, although individually could be perceived as relatively minor or simple, collectively can make a substantial difference in the efficiency of a process or the production of a product, or may be the basis of a marketing or commercial strategy. The collective effect of the items and procedures must be considered in any analysis of whether a trade secret exists and not the general knowledge of each individual item or procedure.	Wilson v. Gandis; Hartsock v. Goodyear Dunlop Tires N. Am.; Laffitte v. Bridgestone Corp.; Atwood Agency. v. Black
South Dakota	S.D. Codified Laws § 37-29-1(4)	A trade secret is information (1) embodied in a "formula, pattern, compilation, program, device, method, technique or proces"; (2) that "derives independent economic value, actual or potential, from not being generally known to, and not being readily ascertainable by proper means by, other persons who can obtain economic value from its disclosure or use"; and (3) "Is the subject of efforts that are reasonable under the circumstances to maintain its secrecy."	Aqreva, LLC v. Bailly, 950 N.W.2d 774 (S.D. 2020); Weins v. Sporleder, 569 N.W.2d 16 (S.D. 1997); Centrol, Inc. v. Morrow, 489 N.W.2d 890 (S.D. 1992)
Tennessee	Tenn. Code Ann. § 47-25-1702	Information, including a formula, pattern, compilation, program, device, method, technique or process to which all of the following apply: 1. The information derives independent economic value, actual or potential, from not being generally known to, and not being readily ascertainable by proper means by, other persons who can obtain economic value from its disclosure or use.: 2. The information is the subject of efforts to maintain its secrecy that are reasonable under the circumstances.	Boesch v. Holeman, 621 S.W.3d 60 (Tenn. Ct. App. 2020)
Texas	Tex. Civ. Prac. & Rem. Code § 134A.002	All forms and types of information, whether tangible or intangible and whether or how stored, compiled, or memorialized physically, electronically, graphically, photographically, or in writing if (1) the owner of the trade secret has taken reasonable measures under the circumstances to keep the information secret (2) the information derives independent economic value, actual or potential, from not being generally known to, and not being readily ascertainable through proper means by, another person who can obtain economic value from the disclosure or use of the information.	Snowhite Textile & Furnishings, Inc. v. Innvision Hosp., Inc., No. 05-18-01447-CV, 2020 Tex. App. LEXIS 9811 (Tex. App.—Dallas December 14, 2020, no pet. h.); Educ. Mgmt. Servs., LLC v. Tracey, 102 F. Supp. 3d 906 (W.D. Tex. 2015)
Utah	Utah Code Ann. § 13-24-2	"Trade secret" means information, including a formula, pattern, compilation, program, device, method, technique, or process, that: (a) derives independent economic value, actual or potential, from not being generally known to, and not being readily ascertainable by proper means by, other persons who can obtain economic value from its disclosure or use; and (b) is the subject of efforts that are reasonable under the circumstances to maintain its secrecy.	USA Power, LLC v. PacifiCorp; InnoSys, Inc. v. Mercer; Cordell v. Berger; CDC Restoration & Constr., LC v. Tradesmen Contrs.
Vermont	9 V.S.A. § 4601	There are two elements that must be met for "information, including a formula, pattern, compilation, program, device, method, technique, or process" to be a trade secret: (a) it must "derive independent economic value, actual or potential, from not being generally known to, and not being readily ascertainable by proper means by, other persons who can obtain economic value from its disclosure or use;" and (b) is must be "the subject of efforts that are reasonable under the circumstances to maintain its secrecy."	Dicks v. Jensen, 172 Vt. 43 (Vt. 2001); Omega Optical, Inc. v. Chroma Tech. Corp., 174 Vt. 10 (Vt. 2002)
Virginia	Va. Code Ann. § 59.1–336	"Trade secret" means information, including but not limited to, a formula, pattern, compilation, program, device, method, technique, or process, that: 1. Derives independent economic value, actual or potential, from not being generally known to, and not being readily ascertainable by proper means by, other persons who can obtain economic value from its disclosure or use, and 2. Is the subject of efforts that are reasonable under the circumstances to maintain its secrecy.	Secure Servs. Tech., Inc. v. Time & Space Processing Inc., 722 F. Supp. 1354 (E.D. Va. 1989); Advanced Computer Servs. of Michigan, Inc. v. MAI Sys. Corp., 845 F. Supp. 356 (E.D. Va. 1994); Physicians Interactive v. Lathian Sys., Inc., No. CA 03-1193-A, 2003 WL 23018270 (E.D. Va. 2003)
Washington	Wash. Rev. Code § 19.108.010(4)	(4) "Trade secret" means information, including a formula, pattern, compilation, program, device, method, technique, or process that: (a) Derives independent economic value, actual or potential, from not being generally known to, and not being readily ascertainable by proper means by, other persons who can obtain economic value from its disclosure or use; and (b) Is the subject of efforts that are reasonable under the circumstances to maintain its secrecy.	Robbins Geller Rudman & Dowd, LLP v. Office of Attorney Gen., 179 Wash. App. 711, 328 P.3d 905 (Wash. Ct. App. 2014); Progressive Animal Welfare Soc'y v. Univ. of Wash., 125 Wn.2d 243, 263, 884 P.2d 592 (Wash. 1994); Ed Nowogroski Ins., Inc. v. Rucker, 137 Wn.2d 427, 438, 971 P.2d 936 (Wash. 1999); NW Monitoring LLC v. Hollander, 534 F. Supp. 3d 1329 (W.D. Wash. 2021)
West Virginia	W. Va. Code, § 47-22-1	"Trade secret" means information, including, but not limited to, a formula, pattern, compilation, program, device, method, technique or process, that: (1) Derives independent economic value, actual or potential, from not being generally known to, and not being readily ascertainable by proper means by, other persons who can obtain economic value from its disclosure or use; and (2) Is the subject of efforts that are reasonable under the circumstances to maintain its secrecy.	Servo Corp. of America v. General Elec. Co., 393 F.2d 551 (C.A.Va. 1968); McGough v. Nalco Co., 496 F.Supp.2d 729 (N.D.W.Va.,2007); IVS Hydro, Inc. v. Robinson, 93 Fed.Appx. 521, 2004 WL 626828
Wisconsin	Wis. Stat. Ann. § 134.90	information, including a formula, pattern, compilation, program, device, method, technique or process to which all of the following apply: 1. The information derives independent economic value, actual or potential, from not being generally known to, and not being readily ascertainable by proper means by, other persons who can obtain economic value from its disclosure or use.: 2. The information is the subject of efforts to maintain its secrecy that are reasonable under the circumstances.	Nalco Chem. Co. v. Hydro Techs., Inc., 984 F.2d 801, (7th Cir. 1993), as amended on denial of reh'g (March 18, 1993); Charles Schwab & Co. Inc. v. LaGrant, 483 F. Supp. 3d 625, (E.D. Wis. 2020)
Wyoming	Wyo. Stat. Ann. §40-24-101	A trade secret is information, including a formula, pattern, compilation, program device, method, technique or process that: (A) Derives independent economic value, actual or potential, from not being generally known to and not being readily ascertainable by proper means by other persons who can obtain economic value from its disclosure or use; and (B) Is the subject of efforts that are reasonable under the circumstances to maintain its secrecy.	PPEX, LLC v. Buttonwood Inc., Case No. 21-CV-53-F, 2021 WL 7210417 (D. Wyo. September 7, 2021)
Washington, D.C.	D.C. Code Ann. § 36-401(4)		Catalyst & Chem. Servs., Inc. v. Glob. Ground Support, 350 F. Supp. 2d 1, 8–9 (D.D.C. 2004)
Puerto Rico	10 L.P.R.A. § 4132	Industrial or trade secrets are deemed to be any information: (a) That has a present or a potential independent financial value or that provides a business advantage, insofar as such information is not common knowledge or readily accessible through proper means by persons who could make a monetary profit from the use or disclosure of such information, and (b) for which reasonable security measures have been taken, as circumstances dictate, to maintain its confidentiality. Any information generated by, used in or resulting from any failed attempts to develop a trade secret shall also be deemed to be a part thereof.	TLS Mgmt. & Mktg. Servs., LLC v. Rodríguez-Toledo, 966 F.3d 46 (1st Cir. 2020); Phillips Med. Sys. P.R. v. GIS Partners Corp., 203 F. Supp. 3d 221 (D.P.R. 2016)
