= UTSA =

UTSA or Utsa may refer to:

- Uniform Trade Secrets Act, a uniform law on trade secret protection in the United States
- University of Texas at San Antonio, an American public research university
  - UTSA Roadrunners, this university's athletic program
- Utsa Patnaik (fl. 1973–2010), an Indian Marxist economist
- Navoiy International Airport in Uzbekistan, ICAO airport code UTSA
- Utsa, a brand of the Indian retailer Trent Limited
