= Christou v. Beatport, LLC =

2012 court case in Colorado

- Court: United States District Court for the District of Colorado
- Full case name: Christou v. Beatport, LLC
- Decided: March 14, 2012
- Docket nos.: 1:10-cv-02912
- Defendant: Beatport, LLC
- Citation: 849 F. Supp. 2d 1055

Holding
- The court held that the plaintiff's MySpace profile constituted a trade secret, which the defendant had misappropriated.

Court membership
- Judge sitting: R. Brooke Jackson

Keywords
- Trade secrets, Social media, Antitrust

Christou v. Beatport, LLC, 849 F. Supp. 2d 1055 (D. Colo. 2012), was a District Court of Colorado case in which the court held that MySpace friend lists could constitute trade secrets. While the names in the friend lists could be found in public directories, the court considered that the "ancillary information" of the friend list provided a means of contact with permission that was not publicly available.

== Background of the case ==
During the 1990s, plaintiff Regas Christou founded several nightclubs in the Denver area, comprising the South of Colfax Nightlife District (known as “SOCO”). These clubs hosted live performances from DJs playing electronic dance music. In 1998, the defendant Bradley Roulier was employed by Christou as a talent buyer for booking A-list DJs at Christou's SOCO venues.

While employed under Christou, Roulier and other coworkers conceived the idea of Beatport, an online marketplace founded in 2003 after Christou had loaned an initial $50,000 in exchange for eventual partial ownership of the company. Christou continued to promote Beatport as it grew into the premier marketplace for electronic dance music. However, in March, 2008, Roulier left Christou's employment to found Beta Nightclub, and never fulfilled his promise of granting Christou partial ownership of Beatport.

Given the influence of Beatport in the electronic dance music marketplace and experiences of DJs canceling shows at his own SOCO clubs in exchange for rebooking at Beta, Christou alleged that Roulier used Beatport to coerce DJs into playing at Beta instead of one of his SOCO nightclubs. Christou filed a complaint to the District Court of Colorado seeking damages, suing Beatport for nine claims including unlawful tying in, attempted monopolization, and theft of a trade secret—the MySpace profile credentials used for connecting his SOCO clubs to DJs.

== Opinion of the Court ==
On 14 March 2012, the court responded to the defendants' motions to dismiss each of plaintiff’s claims. The court dismissed Christou's individual antitrust claims but denied defendants Beatport's, Beta’s, and Mr. Roulier’s motions to dismiss the antitrust claims brought by plaintiffs The Church and Vinyl, as well as those plaintiffs’ claims for misappropriation of trade-secrets.

=== Trade Secret Misappropriation ===
To determine whether plaintiff’s MySpace profile was in fact a trade secret, the court consulted the analysis presented in Colorado Supply Co. v. Stewart, 797 P.2d 1303, 1306-07 (Colo. App. 1990): whether reasonable steps were taken to protect the secrecy and restrict access of the profile, whether employees knew customers' names from general experience, whether customers commonly dealt with more than one supplier, whether customer information could be readily obtained from public directories or other sources outside of plaintiff's business, and lastly whether the owner of the customer list expended great cost and effort over a considerable period of time to develop the files, and whether it would be difficult for a competitor to duplicate the information.

The court agreed with the plaintiff's argument that the profile was a "database" of contact information and permission to contact instead of a mere list of names: the profile not only held contact information for thousands of individuals self-identified as interested customers, but also served as the means (email addresses) and consent to notify and promote DJ performances directly to these potential customers with the authority of plaintiffs’ nightclubs. As a result, the court held that because the MySpace profile had been properly password protected to a select few of Christou's personnel, took great cost to develop, and provided the means and permission to contact instead of just a simple customer list of names, the profile could be held as a trade secret.

Moreover, because Roulier was aware of the password protection of the profile and did not reconstruct his own MySpace friend list to promote DJs, the court ruled that Beatport (Roulier) had knowingly misappropriated the trade secret when it used plaintiffs’ MySpace account to promote his competing nightclub as well as Beatport, citing the analysis used in Gates Rubber Co. v. Bando Chemical Indus. Ltd., 9 F.3d 823, 847 (10th Cir. 1993) -- that the defendant had a trade secret that was used without consent, and that the trade secret was obtained by improper means. The court also considered the public use of the trade secret, as Beatport had promoted itself using the plaintiff's MySpace profile, as grounds for Roulier's knowing of improper acquisition.

=== Antitrust Claims ===
The court also ruled in favor of the plaintiff's claim that Beatport could be charged with attempted monopoly in the market for A-list DJ live performances. At the time of the ruling, Roulier and his club Beta controlled over half of the Denver metro area market for live performance by A-list DJs, and showed specific intent to monopolize and further such a monopoly in using anticompetitive and predatory conduct. The court also granted all other antitrust claims made by the plaintiff. The court dismissed violations of RICO because the plaintiffs did not meet pleading requirements in not demonstrating patterns of racketeering activity (specifically, acts of wire fraud, mail fraud, and bank fraud and theft) by Beatport and Roulier.

The court dismissed Mr. Christou’s individual claim of unlawful tying. The court wrote that, although Christou's SOCO nightclubs had sufficient facts to support antitrust standing, it must consider Christou as an individual. The court found that Christou had alleged sufficient facts that there had been an antitrust injury (to his reputation), but not that the injury to Christou as an individual resulted directly from the antitrust violation.

== Case significance ==
In this case, a federal court held that a MySpace friend list could constitute a trade secret. While the court considered the Colorado statute for trade secrets in its decision, other states such as Maryland, Virginia, and the District of Columbia have nearly identical statutes adopted under the Uniform Trade Secrets Act.

The analysis presented by the court, concluding that the MySpace profile held "ancillary information" including contact information, consent to contact, and the ability to contact on behalf of the plaintiffs leveraging their reputation and authority that "cannot be found in public directories" provided a differing viewpoint from past cases, such as Sasqua Group, Inc. v. Courtney, 2010 WL 3613855 (E.D.N.Y. Aug. 2, 2010) which determined that social media connections such as on Facebook or LinkedIn were not in fact trade secrets due to the fact that the lists of connections were available to the public. Professor of Law Eric Goldman criticized the opinion, saying that it was "opaque and confused." The court holding failed to answer many questions regarding the trade secret ancillary information, such as whether one can copy a MySpace friends list without committing any trade secret misappropriation. Goldman wrote in a blog post that this clearly should be possible. He then pointed out that a user with a copy of the friends list could then send private messages to each of those friends, which again, should not be a violation of trade secret either. Ultimately, he suggested that the decision may have been clearer if the Court treated the account's login credentials as a trade secret instead.

The commentary surrounding this case has been careful to avoid the affirmative declaration that Christou's friends list was a trade secret. This is because the court's order applied to a motion to dismiss. An order from this context does not actually certify that the friends list was a trade secret. Instead, the court concluded "only that Roulier, et al., had not proven that the list could not be a trade secret." The decision allowed Christou to proceed with his claim, and he would then have to prove that the friends list was a trade secret. Plaintiffs’ trade secret claims subsequently survived a motion for summary judgment and proceeded through trial. At the conclusion of the parties’ presentation of evidence, Plaintiffs voluntarily dismissed their trade secret claims as a tactic to force the jury to focus on the antitrust claims.

In a similar case regarding whether social media accounts could be held as trade secrets, PhoneDog v. Kravitz, the United States District Court for the Northern District of California determined that Twitter follower lists and passwords could constitute trade secrets.

Law firm Hahn Loeser ranked this case #7 in its Trade Secret Litigator's Top 10 Trade Secret and Non-Compete Cases of 2012. The list envisioned that businesses would soon come to terms with the increasing importance of corporate social media account ownership policies, and that there would be fewer such disputes.
