= Ajaxo Inc. v. E*Trade Financial Corp. =

Second appeal on a dispute dated back to 1999

- Court: California superior courts California courts of appeal
- Decided: August 30, 2010
- Defendants: Everypath, E*Trade Financial Corp.
- Citation: 187 Cal.App.4th 1295

Keywords
- Trade secret; Misappropriation; Intellectual property

Ajaxo Inc. v. E*Trade Financial Corp., 187 Cal.App.4th 1295 (2010), is the second appeal on a dispute dated back to 1999. During the original 2000 case, defendant E*Trade, an online financial services company, was found liable for maliciously and willfully misappropriating trade secrets pertaining to wireless stock trading technology acquired from the plaintiff, Ajaxo. Under the Uniform Trade Secrets Act E*Trade was required under a mutually signed Non-disclosure agreement (NDA) to keep Ajaxo's trade secrets confidential. After a jury trial in 2003, E*Trade was fined $1.3 million to be paid to Ajaxo for the misappropriation and breach of NDA. The court denied Ajaxo's request for additional damages. All parties appealed. In 2005 the California courts of appeal affirmed the original ruling but remanded the case back to the trial court to determine additional damages. A jury verdict in 2008 rejected claims raised and demands for royalty damages from Ajaxo. In trade secret cases it is common for a plaintiff to seek royalty damages when they are unable to show an actual loss or that the defendant received some inequitable benefit from the misappropriation. In this case the court refused to allow evidence of royalty damages, claiming there were no net damages. Ajaxo appealed. In 2010 the California courts of appeal once again remanded the case back to the trial court reasoning that in such cases an exact quantitative measure of wrongful enrichment damages incurred by the plaintiff might not be sufficient to reject the claim of reasonable royalties based damages

== Introduction ==
E*Trade, an online financial services company, was found liable for misappropriation of trade secrets pertaining to Wireless stock trading technology that it had acquired from software company Ajaxo. Initially awarded $1.3 million, Ajaxo requested additional damages. The trial court denied the request because Ajaxo was unable to show that it had suffered any lost profits from the misappropriation or that E*Trade had received any inequitable benefit. The appeals court asserted that the decision was an error, and that Ajaxo would be allowed to present evidence of royalty damages.

== Legal proceedings ==
On October 27, 2000, a complaint was filed in one of the California superior courts, the Superior Court for the State of California, County of Santa Clara, entitled,

Ajaxo, Inc., a Delaware corporation, Plaintiff, versus E*TRADE GROUP, INC., a Delaware corporation; and Everypath, Inc., a California corporation; and Does 1 through 50, inclusively, Defendants.

Ajaxo claimed for damages and non-monetary compensation for the E*Trade's alleged breach of an NDA with Ajaxo in regards to a wireless stock trading technology offered to E*Trade by Ajaxo. Ajaxo also claimed for damages and other relief against both E*Trade and Everypath, Inc., for their alleged misappropriation of its trade secrets on wireless stock trading technology. After a jury trial, a judgment was entered in 2003 in favor of Ajaxo against E*Trade for $1.3 million for violation of the mutual non-disclosure agreement signed between Ajaxo and E*Trade.

The issue was that even though the jury also found in favor of Ajaxo on its misappropriation of trade secrets claim against E*Trade and Everypath, the trial court subsequently denied Ajaxo's requests for additional damages and relief on basis of these claims. This resulted in all parties appealing the decision, and on December 21, 2005, the California Court of Appeal affirmed the above-described award against E*Trade for violation of the NDA but remanded the case to the trial court for determining the additional damages that Ajaxo could be entitled to as a result of the jury's previous finding in favor of Ajaxo on its claims against E*Trade and Everypath. After the Court of Appeal's ruling, defendant Everypath terminated its operations in January, 2006. As a result, the defendant Everypath was no longer involved in defending the case against it. Although E*Trade paid Ajaxo the full amount due on the judgment against it as directed by the Court of Appeal, this case was remanded back to the trial court, and on May 30, 2008, a jury came up with a verdict in favor of E*TRADE thus resulting in denial of all claims raised and demands for damages against E*Trade by Ajaxo. After the trial court ruled its judgement in favor of E*Trade, on September 5, 2008, Ajaxo filed post trial motions asking the trial court to consider a new trial and nullify its judgment in favor of E*Trade. The trial court ordered rejection of Ajaxo's motions on November 4, 2008.

== Background ==
Facts

The events began unfolding in September 1999, when E*Trade, an online financial services based corporation, signed a Non-Disclosure Agreement (NDA) with Ajaxo, Inc. The terms of this NDA stated the level of details up to which E*Trade required to maintain confidential information it received pertaining to Ajaxo's Wireless stock-trading software. E*Trade was in need of this wireless technology, since at that time its clients could trade stocks using the internet but could not use wireless handheld devices for that purpose. E*Trade was in pursuit of a company to team up with in order to develop a wireless stock trading technology. Ajaxo offered to license its product to E*Trade for $860,000, to which E*Trade made an opposite offer. However, E*Trade rescinded its offer, explaining the small size of Ajaxo as a limiting point for it to come into partnership with E*Trade.

Eventually, E*Trade selected Everypath Inc. (Everypath) in December 1999, to be its wireless vendor. The strange thing is that E*Trade made that agreement even though Everypath did not at that time have a proper wireless product to serve its purpose. A series of events followed this agreement. In the next couple of months, Everypath managed to raise sufficient venture capital funds to further develop the wireless technology as needed by E*Trade for its purposes of developing a platform of Wireless stock trading. Finally, E*Trade and Everypath signed a service provider agreement in March 2000, according to which Everypath was supposed to lease its wireless trading technology to E*Trade.

Further digging into the matter during the first trial provided ample proof for asserting that E*Trade was indeed connected to Everypath, both financially and through its personnel. Everypath had received its series funding from Arrowpath Ventures LLC, a venture capital fund that was managed by its ex-employees of E*Trade. E*Trade's funds comprised 25 percent of the capital in Arrow Ventures's VC fund. This gave E*Trade a financial stake in Everypath indirectly.

However, Ajaxo soon formulated its suspicion that E*Trade had been principally involved in development of Everypath's wireless trading technology. Ajaxo attributed this development to be facilitated by E*Trade's misappropriation of its trade secrets, which Ajaxo had disclosed to E*Trade under the initial mutually signed NDA. Ajaxo further assumed that Everypath utilized this knowledge of the illegitimate source of the information to develop the wireless stock trading technology, which it eventually leased to E*Trade.

Procedure

Ajaxo filed a lawsuit against both E*Trade and Everypath. Ajaxo claimed a cause of action for breach of contract against E*Trade and a California Uniform Trade Secrets Act, CUTSA, cause of action against both of the defendants. Prior to the first trial, Ajaxo formulated a plan to showcase both its actual losses and defendants' wrongful enrichment arising from the misappropriation of its trade secret wireless trading technology. Ajaxo had proposed to introduce an expert witness, Walter Bratic, who was ready to testify and assessed the loss of Ajaxo's profits close to almost $39 million. Ajaxo had to withdraw the expert after E*Trade filed to exclude the expert's testimony before the trial court. During that trial, Ajaxo based its loss case mainly upon wrongful enrichment valuation.

The first trial in the trial court culminated in allowing E*Trade's and Everypath's motion to a little extent for nonsuit on the CUTSA cause of action. They explained that Ajaxo had not produced sufficient proof of damages for misappropriation (as measured by E*Trade's wrongful enrichment). The trial court allowed the jury to evaluate liability under the CUTSA, recognizing that Ajaxo might be entitled to reasonable royalties if defendants were in fact involved in misappropriation of plaintiff's trade secrets pertaining to its wireless technology. The jury eventually found that E*Trade had indeed breached the NDA and it awarded Ajaxo nearly $1.3 million for that claim. The jury also validated that both defendants had with complete intent wrongfully misappropriated the trade secrets, but it did not award any monetary compensation as it was not a part of the plaintiff's claims.

In its first appeal, Ajaxo asserted that the trial court had committed a mistake by separating the damages issue from the jury. The court agreed to this argument. Ajaxo had based its contract cause of action upon the same facts it had used to prove the misappropriation claim earlier. Ajaxo argued that the 2 causes of action shared mutual issues. The other issue was that the only theory of recovery Ajaxo had pursued on its claim for violation of the mutual NDA was that of wrongful enrichment. The same proof Ajaxo had presented to prove its cumulative losses would have been sufficient to verify unjust enrichment due to E*Trade's misappropriation. There was also more than sufficient proof upon which the jury could have found Everypath to have been unjustly enriched either through its valuation based on the VC funds it acquired eventually or through the customer base it would build after development of that technology. Hence, Ajaxo came to a conclusion that the trial court had committed an error in deducing insufficient proof of its wrongful enrichment resulting from the breach of NDA and pushed forward for a new trial based on that fact.

== Appeal ==
E*Trade's Issues on Appeal

E*Trade raised 3 objections to the appeal. These 3 issues in order are denial of fair trial to Ajaxo, rejection of Ajaxo's motion of judgement against the ruled decision, and allowing Ajaxo to be the "prevailing party" under Civil Code section 1717.

Ajaxo's Issues on Appeal

On the other hand, Ajaxo raised five matters on appeal. In the first case, Ajaxo claims that the court committed a mistake by allowing the defendants' motion for nonsuit on damages resulting from their misappropriation of Ajaxo's trade secret technology. In the second case, the court committed a mistake by allowing the defendants' motion for nonsuit on Ajaxo's claim for a fair royalty due to wrongful enrichment. In the third case, Ajaxo was denied extra compensation due to damages because of a mistake committed by the court in allowing the defendants' non-suit on damages. In the fourth case, there was an error committed by the trial court in rejecting injunctive relief to Ajaxo. In the last case, Ajaxo claimed that the court had committed an error by not asking the defendants to compensate for the attorney fees involved in pre-trial work.

Everypath's Issues on Appeal

Depending upon whether the court found any validity in Ajaxo's claims, Everypath brought forward the following issues. In the first case, Everypath claimed that the court had committed a mistake by rejecting its motion for summary judgment notwithstanding the verdict on the jury's findings that Everypath had purposefully misappropriated Ajaxo's wireless stock trading technology trade secrets and had completely authorized that malicious misappropriation. In the second case, Everypath claimed on the basis of court's judgments procedure that it was denied a fair trial.

== Verdict ==
Trial Court

On April 22, 2003, after a 7-week trial, the jury ruled in favor of the plaintiff, Ajaxo Inc., against the defendant, E*Trade Group Inc., for violation of a mutual NDA, awarding an amount of $1.3 million to be paid to the plaintiff for 225 damages resulting from that violation by the defendant. The jury found based on concrete evidence that E*Trade disclosed Ajaxo's trade secret to Everypath for the malicious purpose of satisfying its own requirements of having wireless stock trading technology. This was done clearly without Ajaxo's content, and E*Trade was responsible for maintaining secrecy of the information traded between the two companies under the norm of a mutual Non-Disclosure Agreement. The jury also found Everypath to guilty of acquiring and misappropriating Ajaxo's trade secret without any implied or officially expressed consent.

Appeals Court

Ajaxo found relief on August 30, 2010, when the California Court of Appeal, 6th Appellate District, repealed the lower trial court's decision to reject Ajaxo's claim to unjust enrichment damages arising due to E*Trade's theft claim citing that unjust enrichment in this case was not provable. The appellate court asserted that the Trials court had committed a mistake by rejecting Ajaxo's claim for wrongful enrichment damages just because that E*Trade proved that it had not registered profit from the misappropriated wireless stock trading technology.

The appeals court concluded:

We conclude that where a defendant has not realized a profit or other calculable benefit as a result of his or her misappropriation of a trade secret, unjust enrichment is not provable. To hold otherwise would place the risk of loss on the wronged plaintiff, thereby discouraging innovation and potentially encouraging corporate thievery where anticipated profits might be minimal but other valuable but nonmeasureable benefits could accrue.

The appeals court's conclusion was that the loss incurred by Ajaxo in this case due to E*Trade's misappropriation of its trade secret Wireless stock trading technology could not be accurately quantified.

== Discussion ==
Everypath Investment Evidence

Ajaxo had planned to introduce an expert witness, Walter Bratic, to provide an approximate measure of loss incurred by it resulting from E*Trade's misappropriation of its Wireless stock trading technology. Walter Bratic had offered 3 different explanations for wrongful enrichment damages that were indirectly incurred by Ajaxo. For the first explanation, he asserted that E*Trade's acquisition of new customers resulting from that wireless stock trading technology could be regarded as a viable measure for wrongful enrichment damages. For the second explanation, he used Everypath's valuation based on Ajaxo's misappropriated technology to arrive at a figure of $60 million as a measure of unjust enrichment losses.

E*Trade was able to persuade the Trials Court to discern Walter Bratic's testimony on measure of wrongful damages incurred by Ajaxo since, as Arrowpath's VC funding that was put forth in Everypath was not relevant to E*Trade and was certainly not relevant for measurement of wrongful enrichment damages incurred by Ajaxo. The court ruled:

I just don't see the connection. I think it will confuse the jury. There would be large numbers out there that are just unrelated to the issue of how much E*Trade benefitted. It may be perfectly admissible as to Everypath, but not as to E*Trade.

Ajaxo held on to its ground insisting that Everypath's valuation and Arrowpath's funding in it was certainly relevant.

The 10-K Forms

Ajaxo insisted before the trial to include 10-K forms of E*Trade filed during the trial to be included in the evidence against it for calculating a measure of the wrongful enrichment damages incurred by it due to its misappropriated trade secret wireless stock trading technology. Ajaxo intended to contemplate upon the fact that the profits of E*Trade showed a loss of $20 million in 2002 when compared to 2001, and E*Trade planned to use that fact as a no basis for wrongful enrichment damages incurred by the plaintiff when it introduced that fact as a financial evidence for the jury to consider in exhibit 233.

The trial court refused to include Form 10-K as a part of the evidence citing its irrelevance as unnecessary in the case put against the jury. The court ruled:

I'm not going to allow the 10-Ks in, any part of it. I'm going to go back to my original ruling. These documents are complex. They're confusing. I think to give context you have to give them more than they possibly need. The experts relied on them. They testified from them. So for the record, that evidence that you need, if you're talking about four pillars of whatever it is, it's all here anyway. So, I'm going to deny that.

General

A defendant's unjust enrichment is generally quantified using information resulting from the defendant's profits due to the misappropriation of plaintiff's trade secrets. The laws on the loss of profits generally tends to favor the defendant, and if the lawsuit is filed early to stop the defendant's misappropriation of plaintiff's trade secrets, it might not be possible to quantify the wrongful enrichment damages. In such cases where it is not possible to measure the exact losses arising from wrongful enrichment, a royalty assessment in favor of plaintiff can help to fairly evaluate the value of its misappropriated trade secrets. Generally speaking a feasible value of royalty assessment should be done by expert who can measure the extent of misappropriation and can arrive at a fair conclusion accordingly.

== Conclusion ==
Trade secret misappropriation is a sensitive issue in which case if the plaintiff's claims are proven, they should be given ample opportunity to prove that their trade secret misappropriation could result in appropriate compensation in various forms, such as royalty adjustment or a standard industry licensing rate for that specific technology. In this case, E*Trade could prove no unjust enrichment that could force them to pay properly for misappropriation to Ajaxo. However, Everypath used that misappropriated trade secret to develop wireless stock trading technology that it could have licensed to clients other than E*Trade, and it should still be held accountable for wrongful enrichment damages along with E*Trade. Such cases related to corporate stealing, can hamper the morale of small companies trying to come up with innovative ideas to shape and define the new trends in different technology sectors.
