= PhoneDog v. Kravitz =

Legal case in California about ownership of Twitter accounts

- Court: United States District Court for the Northern District of California
- Full case name: PHONEDOG, Plaintiff, v. NOAH KRAVITZ, Defendant.
- Decided: November 8, 2011

Holding
- Twitter passwords and follower lists could constitute trade secrets.

Court membership
- Judge sitting: Maria-Elena James

Keywords
- Trade secrets, Social media, Tortious interference

PhoneDog v. Kravitz, No. 11-03474 (N.D. Cal. November 8, 2011), was a case in the United States District Court for the Northern District of California about whether Twitter accounts and their passwords could be company property or trade secrets. In this case a mobile device news website PhoneDog sued Noah Kravitz, its former employee, after Kravitz refused to turn over password information for the Twitter account he developed and cultivated during his employment. When Kravitz asked the court to dismiss this case, the court held that Twitter accounts and their passwords (as described by PhoneDog) could constitute trade secrets and that failure on behalf of the employee to relinquish an account could constitute misuse of a trade secret or "trade secret misappropriation." This case is often cited in arguments for the importance of including clauses about social media account ownership in employment contracts.

== Background ==
PhoneDog is a mobile device news and reviews website that employed Noah Kravitz as a product reviewer and video blogger. Working as a writer for PhoneDog, Noah Kravitz amassed 17,000 followers under the Twitter username @Phonedog_Noah. When he quit his job in October 2010 Kravitz kept his Twitter account and changed its handle to @noahkravitz. PhoneDog ran a farewell video post in which viewers are directed to follow Kravitz via the new @noahkravitz handle. In January 2011, Kravitz began working for a PhoneDog competitor, Technobuffalo, and used his Twitter account as part of his work.

== Claims ==
Kravitz initially filed breach of contract and related claims against PhoneDog in a separate case, claiming his former employer had neglected to pay out his contract after he left. PhoneDog then brought suit with four claims against Kravitz: 1) Misappropriated Trade Secrets; 2) Intentional Interference with Prospective Economic Advantage; 3) Negligent Interference with Prospective Economic Advantage and 4) Conversion. Kravitz responded by asking the court to dismiss the case. Claims (2) and (3) were dismissed then later revised and accepted by the court.

== District Court's opinion ==
=== Misappropriation of trade secrets ===
In 2011, PhoneDog sued Kravitz for trade secret misappropriation or misuse of a company trade secret. PhoneDog claimed that Kravitz's Twitter account, particularly the password to the account, was a trade secret, and that his continued use of the account to connect followers to a PhoneDog competitor was misappropriation.

The claim for misappropriation of trade secrets is governed by the California Uniform Trade Secrets Act (CUTSA). CUTSA defines a trade secret as "information, including a formula, pattern, compilation, program, device, method, technique, or process, that: 1) Derives independent economic value ... from not being generally known to the public ... and 2) Is the subject of efforts that are reasonable under the circumstances to maintain its secrecy." in accordance with these definitions, PhoneDog identified its trade secret as the passwords and other information associated with all @Phonedog_NAME Twitter accounts. The court did not dismiss PhoneDog's trade secret claims, holding that the Twitter account and its password could constitute a trade secret under California law.

CUTSA defines misappropriation as "[a]cquisition of a trade secret of another by a person who knows or has reason to know [it] was acquired by improper means" or unauthorized "[d]isclosure or use of a [another's] trade secret." The district court held that Kravitz's refusal to relinquish his access to his Twitter account could constitute misappropriation.

=== Interference with prospective economic advantage ===
In the initial filing PhoneDog failed to establish the relationships allegedly compromised by the defendant, as well as the duty owed to PhoneDog by Kravitz; as a result the court did not find merit in these claims and on November 8, 2011, they were dismissed from suit No. C 11-03474 MEJ and PhoneDog was offered an opportunity to revise their claims. On January 8, 2012, PhoneDog submitted a revised set of claims establish that the harmed relationships were: 1) 17,000 Twitter users as well as the merchants; and 2) Kravitz was operating as an agent of PhoneDog in operating the Twitter account and thus had a duty that was not met and thus resulted in negligent interference. The court accepted these revised claims.

PhoneDog claimed that Kravitz committed intentional interference with their business (or their "prospective economic advantage") by using confidential information to disrupt their relationship with their customers. "In Korea Supply Co. v. Lockheed Martin Corp., the Supreme Court of California compiled and summarized the elements of the tort as: 1) an economic relationship between the plaintiff and some third party, with the probability of future economic benefit to the plaintiff; 2) the defendant's knowledge of the relationship; 3) intentional acts on the part of the defendant designed to disrupt the relationship; 4) actual disruption of the relationship; and 5) economic harm to the plaintiff approximately caused by the acts of the defendant." PhoneDog argued that its relationship with three entities were harmed: 1) 17,000 Twitter users; 2) Current and prospective advertisers; and 3) CNBC and Fox News. The Court found the relationship between PhoneDog and its current and prospective advertisers showed sufficient merit for the plaintiff to continue with the claim, but in a footnote mention that similar arguments for the other two relationships were weaker.

PhoneDog further claimed that Kravitz committed negligent interference with prospective economic advantage. In order to be successful with the claim of negligent interference the plaintiff must meet four criterion: 1) an economic relationship existed between the plaintiff and a third party which contained a reasonably probable future economic benefit or advantage to plaintiff; 2) the defendant knew of the existence of the relationship and was aware or should have been aware that if it did not act with due care its actions would interfere with this relationship and cause plaintiff to lose in whole or in part the probable future economic benefit or advantage of the relationship; 3) the defendant was negligent; and 4) such negligence caused damage to plaintiff in that the relationship was actually interfered with or disrupted and plaintiff lost in whole or in part the economic benefits or advantage reasonably expected from the relationship. A key aspect of the negligent interference claim requires that the plaintiff establish defendants obligation to a duty of care; "[a]mong the criteria for establishing a duty of care is the blameworthiness of the defendant's conduct. For negligent interference, a defendant's conduct is blameworthy only if it was independently wrongful apart from the interference itself."

Kravitz argued that PhoneDog had no economic relationship with any of its Twitter followers and thus his use of the Twitter account did not disrupt any ongoing business. The success of the plaintiffs argument for this claim was not clear in the initial Court opinions for this case.

=== Conversion ===
PhoneDog's final claim asserted that changing the name of the Twitter account constituted unlawfully changing or "converting" the ownership of the account. The elements of a conversion claim under California law are: "1) ownership of a right to possession of property; 2) wrongful disposition of the property right of another; and 3) damages." Kravitz argued that PhoneDog did not establish that they owned the Twitter account, but the court held that "the nature of [the] claim is at the core of this lawsuit and cannot be determined on the present record."

=== Jurisdiction ===
Kravitz further argued that a federal district court was not the correct venue for the case, because the alleged trade secrets were worth less than $8,000, the minimum limit for a federal court case. He referenced sites like TweetValue and whatsmytwitteraccountworth.com to assess the value of his account. The court rejected Kravitz's claim that the value of the Twitter account was too small to bring a case in federal district court. They said that the value of the Twitter followers was so tied up with other parts of the case that they could not dismiss the case on this basis.

== Outcome ==
In December 2012, the PhoneDog and Kravitz settled in PhoneDog v. Kravitz, No. 11-03474 (N.D. Cal. January 8, 2013). Although the details of the settlement are confidential, Kravitz continues to use the Twitter handle @noahkravitz.

== Significance ==
Several news sources speculated that this case would clarify who owns a social media account and what elements of a social media account could constitute trade secrets. Numerous legal scholars (and Kravitz himself) have cited this case when arguing that employers should specify who owns work-related social media accounts when employees sign employment contracts.

Issues addressed by this case did not go unnoticed by businesses; a correspondent for Fortune reported that employees with policies governing social media use increased from 55% to 69% in the year following this case.

=== California Assembly Bill AB1844 ===
On September 27, 2012, shortly before PhoneDog and Kravitz settled, California Assembly Bill AB1844 was passed. Eric Goldman, a writer for Forbes, argued that "the law assumes that social media accounts have only two states: personal or not-personal. Instead, social media accounts fit along a continuum where the endpoints are: 1) completely personal; and 2) completely business-related–but many employees' social media accounts (narrowly construed, ignoring the statutory overbreadth problem) fit somewhere in between those two endpoints. Indeed, employers and employees routinely disagree about whether or not a social media account was personal or business-related."

The effect of AB1844 and its relevance to accounts curated by employees for the employer, remains to be seen; further cases like PhoneDog v. Kravitz will be necessary to establish much needed clarity regarding employer rights in this area of the law.

== See also ==
- Web property
- Uniform Trade Secrets Act
- Tortious interference
- Christou v. Beatport, LLC, a case which constituted that Myspace profiles could be held as trade secrets
