= International Securities Exchange =

American multinational financial services corporation

International Securities Exchange Holdings, Inc.
- Type: Subsidiary
- Industry: Exchange
- Founded: May 26, 2000; 26 years ago
- Headquarters: New York City, New York, United States
- Key people: Gary Katz (CEO)
- Products: Options; Stock; Market Data
- Parent: Nasdaq, Inc.
- Website: www.ise.com

International Securities Exchange Holdings, Inc. (ISE) is a wholly owned subsidiary of American multinational financial services corporation Nasdaq, Incorporated. It is a member of the Options Clearing Corporation (OCC) and the Options Industry Council (OIC).

Founded in 2000, the ISE was conceived in 1997 when then-chairman of E-Trade, William A. Porter, and his colleague, Marty Averbuch, approached David Krell and Gary Katz about their concept, and the four founded what is today the International Securities Exchange, a leading U.S. equity options exchange.

Launched as the first fully electronic US options exchange, ISE developed a unique market structure for advanced screen-based trading.

ISE offers equity and index options, including proprietary index products, as well as FX options based on foreign currency pairs. ISE also offers market data tools designed for sophisticated investors seeking information on investor sentiment, volatility, and other options data.

In August 2008, the ISE Stock Exchange announced a partnership with the electronic communication network Direct Edge. The deal made the ISE Stock Exchange a wholly owned subsidiary of Direct Edge and gave ISE an ownership stake in Direct Edge.

In 2013, ISE strengthened its focus on ETF and index development with the introduction of ISE ETF Ventures.

== ISE Options Exchange ==
The International Securities Exchange (ISE) operates three U.S. options exchanges: ISE, ISE Gemini, and ISE Mercury.

== Timeline ==
2000	February 24, 2000: Registered as a national securities exchange with the Securities and Exchange Commission; May 26, 2000: Launched its Options Exchange - the first transaction was a purchase of 20 SBC Communications October 45 calls.
2001	May 29, 2001: Traded its 25 millionth contract.; November 1, 2001: Became the 3rd largest U.S. equity options exchange when average daily volume for October 2001 reached 380,299 contracts,
2002	May 22, 2002: Met its goal of listing equity options representing 90% of average daily trading volume in the US options industry.; October 29, 2002: Traded its 200 millionth contract.
2003	February 20, 2003: Traded its 250 millionth contract.; March 1, 2003: Became the largest US equity options exchange after average daily volume for February 2003 reached 710,218 contracts.
2004	January 2004: Was named Derivatives Exchange of the Year by Risk Magazine for the second time in three years.
2005	March 9, 2005: Became the first securities exchange to sell its shares in an initial public offering.; May 24, 2005: Traded its 1 billionth contract.; December 8, 2005: Completed its secondary public offering.
2006	January 20, 2006: Traded a record daily trading volume of 4,580,678 equity and index options contracts.; March 24, 2006: Launches its alternative markets trading platform.; May 16, 2006: Traded its 1.5 billionth contract.; September 1, 2006: Adopted a holding company structure.; September 8, 2006: Launched the ISE Stock Exchange, with its first product, MidPoint Match.; December 8, 2006: ISE Stock Exchange rolled out its fully displayed stock market, the first fully electronic exchange to provide integrated access to non-displayed and displayed liquidity pools.
2007	February 27, 2007: Set a new record daily trading volume of 5,531,875 equity and index options. contracts.; March 5, 2007: Announced partnership Toronto Stock Exchange to launch DEX, a new derivatives market in 2009. The agreement was later terminated when the Toronto Stock Exchange agreed to buy Montreal Exchange Inc.; March 9, 2007: Traded its 2 billionth options contract.; April 17, 2007: Launched ISE FX Options.; April 30, 2007: Eurex, the derivatives exchange of Deutsche Börse and SWX Swiss Exchange, agreed to buy ISE for about $2.8 billion in cash ($67.50 a share), creating a transatlantic derivatives marketplace.; December 20, 2007: Eurex completes acquisition of ISE. ISE will continue to be regulated by the SEC as a registered national securities exchange and will operate under the existing management team as an independent subsidiary of Eurex.
2008	September 18, 2008: Trades a new record daily trading volume of 7,903,304 options contracts.; October 28, 2008: Enters into an agreement with the New York Stock Exchange to license the right to list ISE FX Options products on the NYSE Arca Options platform.; December 23, 2008: Completes deal with Direct Edge. ISE Stock Exchange becomes a wholly owned subsidiary of the Direct Edge with ISE gaining a 31.54% ownership stake.
2011	
2016	March 9, 2016: American exchange operator Nasdaq announced it will buy International Securities Exchange (ISE.N) for $1.1 billion.; June 30, 2016: Nasdaq completes acquisition of ISE.

== See also ==
- List of stock exchanges
- List of stock exchanges in the Americas
