= Comprehensive Technologies International, Inc. v. Software Artisans, Inc. =

U.S. federal court case

- Court: United States Court of Appeals for the Fourth Circuit
- Full case name: Comprehensive Technologies International, Incorporated v. Software Artisans, Incorporated, et al
- Argued: March 30, 1993
- Decided: August 25, 1993
- Citation: 3 F.3d 730

Case history
- Subsequent history: Opinion and judgment vacated and case dismissed on petition for rehearing, September 30, 1993.

Court membership
- Judges sitting: Kenneth Keller Hall, Francis Dominic Murnaghan Jr., Karen J. Williams

Case opinions
- Majority: Williams, joined by Hall
- Concur/dissent: Murnaghan

Comprehensive Technologies International, Inc. v. Software Artisans, Inc., 3 F.3d 730 (4th Cir. 1993) was a case in which the U.S. Court of Appeals for the Fourth Circuit discussed legal tests for software copyright infringement, and ruled that trade secret misappropriation requires more than circumstantial evidence. The case also ruled on what terms may be reasonable and enforceable in non-compete agreements.

== Background ==
Virginia-based Comprehensive Technologies International (CTI) primarily dealt with defense-related services. In 1988, they created a software group and expanded into Electronic Data Interchange with Claims Express, targeted at the medical industries, and EDI Link, designed to make and use a range of forms.

In February 1991, with EDI Link incomplete, seven CTI employees left the company and formed Software Artisans, Inc. (SA) in April 1991. Software Artisans created a program called Transend which also used EDI transmission to send forms. Transend was developed and marketed by July 1991.

CTI sued Software Artisans and its former employees Marshall Dean Hawkes, Igor Filippides, Randall Sterba, Richard Hennig, David Bixler, Alvan Bixler, and Mark Hawkes for copyright infringement, trade secret misappropriation, breach of confidentiality, and breach of contract. CTI also alleged that Dean Hawkes violated his non-compete agreement.

The district court ruled for the defendants on all counts. CTI appealed, and the case was argued in the Fourth Circuit Court of Appeals on March 30, 1993.

== Copyright infringement ==
The district court ruled against CTI's claims of copyright infringement, due to findings that Transend was not a literal copy of either of CTI's software programs, nor was it substantially similar to either in structure, sequence, and organization. CTI argued that the court should instead have compared with the “abstraction-flitration-comparison” test used by the Second Circuit. The Fourth Circuit ruled that CTI did not meet their burden of proof because they did not indicate evidence from the trial that would have proven their point, therefore the district court's finding on copyright infringement claims were affirmed for the defendant.

== Trade secret misappropriation ==
CTI's claims of trade secret misappropriation were also denied by the district court due to insufficient evidence. The district court found that CTI's claimed trade secrets did not fulfill the requirements of deriving independent economic value from not generally being known and not being readily ascertainable. In addition, the court concluded that there was no evidence that Software Artisans had copied CTI's claimed secret, which the court equated with misappropriation's requirement of "use" of the secret.

Presented evidence of misappropriation was circumstantial: short development time and no documentation of the software design. Software Artisans' programmers testified that they preferred to work on a whiteboard and annotate their code rather than produce formal documentation, and an expert witnesses testified that it was common for small software companies to neglect formal documentation. This testimony was sufficient for the court to deny the circumstantial evidence that is common in such cases.

== Non-compete agreement ==
The district court declined to enforce Dean Hawkes' covenant not to compete, reasoning that it was broader than necessary according to Virginia's three-part test for assessing whether such restrictive covenants are reasonable: no greater restraint than is necessary from the employer's perspective, not unduly harsh from the employee's perspective, and reasonable in terms of sound public policy. On appeal, the court cited similar restrictions that were not deemed unreasonable in scope, and noted Hawkes' thorough knowledge of CTI's confidential information. With that ruling vacated, the decision on whether Hawkes breached his agreement was remanded to the district court.

== See also ==
- Uniform Trade Secrets Act
