= Bernard A. Newcomb =

American businessman (1943–2023)

- Born: Bernard Alan Newcomb; November 10, 1943; Long Beach, California, USA
- Died: January 29, 2023 (aged 79); Palo Alto, California, USA
- Education: Oregon State University
- Occupations: former VP Engineering and co-founder of E*TRADE
- Spouse: Carol J. Kearney (1999–2001) Gerry Lee Marshall (2020–2023)

Bernard (Bernie or Bing) Alan Newcomb (November 10, 1943 – January 29, 2023) was an American businessperson and philanthropist who, along with William A. Porter, founded the online discount stock brokerage firm, E*TRADE. Newcomb was legally blind.

== Early life ==
Newcomb grew up in Scio, Oregon. He was the middle child of Lyle and Agnes (Mazachek) Newcomb. Born with congenital cataracts, Newcomb was always legally blind.

He attended the Oregon School for the Blind from kindergarten through second grade, having to board during the week and return home on weekends. He attended public schools in Scio through high school where he graduated as class valedictorian.

Newcomb was the first in his family to attend college as a business major at Oregon State University, consistently making dean's list and graduating third in his class in the College of Business. Newcomb received his B.A. in Business Administration from Oregon State University in 1965. He was a member of the Delta Sigma Phi fraternity. Upon graduation, he found accounting firms and banks did not consider him employable because of his blindness. His college counselor persuaded General Electric to hire Newcomb in their data processing department at the Hanford Project in Richland, Washington, where he was employed for three years.

== Creation of E*TRADE ==
In 1980, in Palo Alto, California, Newcomb met Bill Porter who had recently purchased an Apple II computer with the idea that a personal computer could be used to buy and sell stock, but having no means of accessing the necessary information with his modem. During the conversation, Porter convinced Newcomb to become partners and create a company that would enable an individual with a personal computer to trade stocks from home—to disintermediate stock buying. Newcomb's role was to develop the programming for the project.

In 1992, PC Magazine featured Trade*Plus on its cover. In 1992, The San Jose Business Journal named Trade*Plus the year's fastest-growing private company in Silicon Valley. In 1996, Trade*Plus was renamed E*TRADE Group and went public. Newcomb was incentivized to retire soon after and established a philanthropic foundation, the Bernard A. Newcomb Foundation.

== Later work and charities ==
In 1997, Newcomb gave Oregon State University the largest stock gift in its history: $6.1 million in stock from the company he helped found and created four new endowments to directly benefit students and academic programs in the College of Business. Each year he would meet with the winners of the Newcomb Family Endowed Scholarship. Additionally, when Weatherford Hall underwent $20 million in renovations in 2004, Newcomb made a $250,000 contribution to name the cyber cafe Bing's, a reference to his childhood nickname. Trader Bing's and the Bernard A. Newcomb Digital Commons in Austin Hall are also named in his honor.

Newcomb co-launched ITXS, an auction site for second-hand IT-related items, with Herb Swanson and Mike Symons in 2000.

Newcomb was awarded the Helen Keller Achievement Award by the American Foundation for the Blind in 2006 for his work to improve the quality of life of the blind.

In 2005 Newcomb donated $5 million to the Peninsula Community Foundation. The Foundation later merged with Community Foundation Silicon Valley to become the Silicon Valley Community Foundation.

Newcomb also donated to Scio High School, Scio, Oregon, in support of its sport programs, specifically football. In 2000, he and his family donated $1.3 million to build a football field, track, stadium (including locker rooms, a weight room, and wrestling room), and parking lot. In 2013, Newcomb donated another $850,000 of the total $1.3 million project cost for the purchase and installation of new artificial turf at the stadium.

Newcomb was also a supporter of the Castilleja School, most recently donating to the renovation of its Gunn Administration Building; the 2nd floor Newcomb Board/Conference Room is named in his honor.

== Personal life ==
On September 11, 1999, Newcomb married Carol J. Kearney in Bend, Oregon. They divorced June 26, 2001. Newcomb married Gerry Lee (Saemisch) Marshall on December 18, 2020, in Los Altos, California. He has no children.

Newcomb lived a quiet life, residing in Palo Alto with his wife until his death at home January 29, 2023, following a long illness.
