= William A. Porter =

William Asbury Porter, Jr.
- Born: November 10, 1928; Boulder, Colorado, US
- Died: October 15, 2015 (aged 86); Kilauea, Hawaii, US
- Education: Adams State College; Kansas State University; Massachusetts Institute of Technology
- Known for: Founder of E-Trade
- Spouse(s): Ava Guthrie (div. 1974) Joan (m. 1990)
- Children: 3

William A. Porter (1928–2015) was an American businessperson who, along with Bernard A. Newcomb, founded the first electronic trading platform, E-Trade.

After the success of E-Trade, Porter also co-founded International Securities Exchange with Marty Averbuch and became the first chairman of ISE on his 70th birthday in 1998. Porter was the former chief executive officer, board member, and chairman emeritus of E-Trade.

In 2000, CNN called Porter the "forefather of online trading".

Later in his life he donated money to businesses and nonprofits benefiting organic farming, recreation and community building on Kauai's North Shore.

== Background ==
Porter was born to William Asbury Porter Sr. (1899-1965) and Dorothy Louise Bullock Porter (1905-1980). He was raised in Boulder, Colorado, and spent his childhood summers as a cowboy on a Colorado ranch. Porter quit high school to join the Navy during WWII and was expelled from the Navy when they learned he was only sixteen. Porter later put himself through college, finishing undergraduate work in three years and working nights as a crew dispatcher on the Denver and Rio Grande Railroad. According to a 2000 CNN interview, Porter attributes his self-confidence to his work as a young cowboy:

Hard, hard work. I used to get up at four o'clock in the morning and it was my job to go out and get the horses in and so forth and come in and eat and sit on a horse all day long. And when we weren't doing that, we were, you know, stacking hay or mowing the oats or, you know, whatever. When you're in the homesteading frame of mind you just do things because they're right and you have that self-confidence that just won't quit.

As a student at Adams State College, Porter and other students would take turns visiting and reading aloud to the aged and infirmed former governor of Colorado, Billy Adams.

=== Education ===
Porter received a B.A. from Adams State College, an M.S. in Physics from Kansas State University, and an M.B.A. from the Sloan Fellows program at the MIT Sloan School of Management.

== Career ==
=== First company ===
Porter started Commercial Electronics Inc. in 1968 and developed the first commercial low-light night vision for electron microscopes and the first color low-light (night vision) broadcast television camera, a technology that's used today in all broadcast cameras. Porter sold Commercial Electronics to Warner Communications after the cancellation of a large order during the 1974 recession.

=== Patents ===
Porter holds 14 patents, having developed a number of electronic devices and processes—including for the aforementioned "first" shoulder-mounted-backpack broadcast color TV camera, the first infrared horizon sensor for satellite stabilization (prior to Sputnik), and several other breakthroughs still in use today in a variety of fields—including, according to the 2000 CNN interview, devices used by the US military to this day.

=== The Search ===
Under the project name The Search, Porter developed the first electronic diesel-electric locomotive "checkout system," whereby a testing device could be inserted into a locomotive engine. The Southern Pacific and B&O Railroads suggested the system could improve operating capacity of the approximately 33,000 locomotive engines in the US by roughly 10 percent.

=== Management and Directorships ===
Porter was Chairman of Trelleborg Rubber Company, President of Tretorn Shoes, and President of Commercial Electronics Incorporated (see below). Porter was Director of Research and Planning for Textron from 1962–67, and Research Manager and Electrical Engineer of General Electric's Advanced Electronics Center at Cornell University from 1957–62. He was a physicist with the National Bureau of Standards from 1952–1957.

== Creation of E-Trade ==
In 1980, in Palo Alto, Porter met Bernie Newcomb at a party. Having recently purchased an Apple II computer, Porter had the idea that a personal computer could be used to buy and sell stock. Having no means of accessing the necessary information with his modem, Porter convinced Newcomb to become his partner and together create a company that would enable any individual with a personal computer to trade stocks from their home—thereby disintermediating stock trades. Newcomb developed the programming which enabled the project to succeed.

According to Porter, the first actual trade, made on July 11, 1983, was made by a dentist in Michigan.

In 1992, PC Magazine featured Trade*Plus on its cover. In 1992, The San Jose Business Journal named Trade*Plus the year's fastest growing private company in Silicon Valley. In 1996, Trade*Plus was renamed E-Trade Group and went public. Newcomb retired soon after and established a philanthropic foundation, the Bernard A. Newcomb Foundation.

== Personal life and philanthropy ==
Porter had three children from his first wife, Ada Guthrie, now deceased. He and his second wife Joan, who has one child from a previous marriage, had homes in Portola Valley, California, and Princeville, Hawaii. Together, the Porters had ten grandchildren. Joan Porter was the founder and president of the Stillheart Institute in Woodside, CA (2003-2014).

In 1999, Porter and his wife Joan gave $25 million to the MIT Sloan School of Management.

My wife and I decided to give one major thing that would have significant meaning for humankind, and trying to leverage the Institute's technological capability through entrepreneurship for the betterment of the human condition is it.

In 2007, the Porters gave 250,000 shares of E-Trade stock to Adams State College (worth approximately $5.8 million at the time), the largest gift in the school's history.

Porter died October 15, 2015, at home in Princeville, Hawaii.
