= Law on the Protection of Trade Secrets =

2019 German law

GeschGehG
- Long title: Gesetz zum Schutz von Geschäftsgeheimnissen
- Citation: Law text
- Territorial extent: Germany
- Passed: 18 April 2019
- Effective: 26 April 2019

Summary
- Business law

The German Law on the Protection of Trade Secrets (German: Gesetz zum Schutz von Geschäftsgeheimnissen), or Trade Secrets Law in short (German: GeschGehG), serves to protect business secrets against unauthorized acquisition, use, and disclosure (§ 1 Abs. 1 Trade Secrets Law). The law implements the Directive (EU) 2016/943 on the Protection of Trade Secrets in German law. It replaces the right to secrecy, which was previously regulated in §§ 17-19 of the Act Against Unfair Competition.

== Legislative history ==
On 21 March 2019, the Bundestag adopted the draft of The Law on the Protection of Trade Secrets. The Federal Council (German: Bundesrat) approved the bill on 12 April 2019. On 18 April 2019, the Law was enacted as Article 1 of the Law transposing Directive (EU) 2016/943 on the protection of undisclosed know-how and business information (trade secrets) against their unlawful acquisition, use and disclosure.

== Criticism of the bill of the Federal Government ==
In the original bill of the Federal Ministry of Justice led by the SPD, which became public for the first time in April 2018, there was no exception for journalists and whistleblowers. It is expressly included in the EU Directive on which the law is based. In addition, companies in the German version should be allowed to determine for themselves what is and is not a trade secret. So also documents that prove a scandal. Companies could also report journalists to the prosecution if they report on internal documents. In the course of the investigations, editorial offices could have been searched and informants had been revealed. The persons concerned had been suspected of having committed a criminal offense for the duration of the investigation. Media associations and trade unions warned that journalists in particular, for fear of public prosecutorial investigations in the future, could shy away from uncovering maladministration. Especially since they could no longer guarantee their informants' protection. The likelihood that tax scandals, diesel manipulations or the like would come to light in the future, would be significantly reduced, if not nullified.

The original government bill, as described above, provided that only companies should be able to decide what is and is not a secret. In the view of the German Federation of Trade Unions, that would have been a muzzle for employees and their interest groups. On the part of the German Trade Union Confederation also an impairment of works council rights was suspected because employees could be hindered due to secrecy obligations to communication with the committees.

There was also criticism of the exemptions for persons who reveal trade secrets. The original draft from the Ministry of Justice, which had also been launched by the Federal Cabinet, still focused on the "intention" of doing something good for the public. The disclosing person had to act with the motive that the general public was "pointing out a malady in order to contribute to a social change," it had said. Critics had rejected this clause as a "mindfulness test" incompatible with the directive. This "mind test" came about through a translation error. Under the EU Directive, a whistleblower is justified if its publication objectively fulfills the purpose of serving the public interest. The German Ministry of Justice did not translate "purpose" with "purpose" but with "intention". Those who give scandals to the press must act with the intention of serving the public interest and must justify themselves accordingly. "This is the attitude test that is fortunately alien to modern criminal law," judged the left politician Niema Movassat.

However, these aspects were corrected in the legislative process (see below, in the section entitled "Content of the law after the resolution by the German Bundestag").

== Content of the law after resolution by the German Bundestag ==
The law protects companies from espionage by competitors, while excluding journalists and their whistle-blowers from the criminal system. For the first time, whistleblowers are legally protected from prosecution.

By law, trade secrets which, according to the bill, have been created, inter alia, by an independent discovery or creation, are subject to uniform minimum protection throughout the European Union. Those who can invoke the law are provided with effective tools to defend themselves against unauthorized acquisition, use or disclosure of trade secrets. As a result, they may request that any documents, electronic files or other objects obtained be destroyed or published, or products recalled or destroyed on the basis thereof. In addition, they can take infringers "on the elimination of impairment and risk of recurrence even on an omission to complete" and have a broader right to information and the right to compensation.

The word trade secret had so far been substantiated only by the case law. The law defines the concept of trade secrets for the first time legally and uniformly throughout the European Union. The prerequisite for the existence of a trade secret is, among other things, the existence of appropriate secrecy measures of the companies such as "physical access restrictions" or "contractual security mechanisms" as well as a legitimate interest in the protection of the relevant information. In the official justification, the notion of legitimate interest states: "Legitimate interest may be any interest approved by the law. It also includes interests of an economic or immaterial nature, if approved by the legal system. Both personal interests such as the enforcement of claims or defense against impairments as well as the pursuit of legitimate group interests, for example, when the employee representatives informed about an imminent downsizing. [...] Any interest accepted by the legal system may be taken into account, including economic and non-material. For example, the right to recall and destruction may be disproportionate if the products are considered as infringing products merely because they are the subject of unlawful marketing. "The SPD Bundestag member Nina Scheer explained the purpose of legitimate interest in a Bundestag speech as follows: "Where trade secrets might no longer be protected, where there is a legitimate public interest in learning something that is in the scope of trade secrets - when it comes to investigative journalism, or even when workers are broaching issues, knowing these trade secrets - it must be possible to do so, to talk about it being revealed."

The law explicitly excludes employee and co-determination regulations from its scope, because there were two different, coherent criticisms of the government bill. On the one hand, companies should be able to decide what is secret and what is not. On the other hand, trade union sides also suspected that works council rights were impaired because employees could be prevented from communicating with the committees because of secrecy obligations. However, according to the law passed by the Bundestag, trade secrets are only considered to be information whose confidentiality the owner has a legitimate interest in secrecy (see comments above). In addition, it is expressly regulated that individual and collective industrial relations are not affected by the law.

In addition, whistleblowers or journalists are no longer classified per se as infringer or adjudicators when they make trade secrets public, because "There is also a change in § 5: We have made an exception for the justification just mentioned - just to prevent that there is a lack of clarity on the part of journalism: am I going to do something for which I should first have to justify myself in court, or am I doing something that definitely, from the outset, falls under an exemption?" Journalists and whistleblowers fall rather, in the case of a pertinent publication, from the beginning under an extended exception clause. The offenses in § 23 Trade Secrets Law also contain a justification for the violation of trade secrets by aid treatment by representatives of the press and the radio, which - such. As well as (syndicates) lawyers - among the so-called professional secretaries include. This justification is intended to minimize deterrent effects on journalists and is modeled on §353b of the German Criminal Code. This general exception is justified by the criminality risks for investigative journalists contained in the bill of the federal government and much-criticized (see in detail the remarks under point "criticism of the bill of the Federal Government" above).

Among other things, the law strengthens the protection of sources for journalists by introducing far-reaching exemptions for so-called whistleblowers: For instance, the publication of information is not covered by the protection of secrecy if the published information is to reveal unlawful acts and professional or other misconduct. The prerequisite for this is that the disclosure is of public interest. This is to prevent the publication is based on an act of revenge or this should only be used as a means of pressure. By contrast, acts described by the law as "mixed motivations" are considered harmless.
