= Biswamohan Pani =

Designer charged in 2008 with stealing $1 billion worth of trade secrets from Intel

Biswamohan Pani is a former design engineer at Intel. In November 2008 he was charged with stealing $1 billion worth of trade secrets from Intel while he worked for its main rival, Advanced Micro Devices (AMD). The information he allegedly obtained was believed to be related to Intel's then next-generation Itanium microprocessor. The incident shed light, according to BusinessWeek, on the vulnerability of Intel, one of the world's biggest and most sophisticated technology companies. On April 6, 2012, Biswamohan Pani pleaded guilty to five counts of wire fraud before U.S. District Judge F. Dennis Saylor IV for accessing Intel systems and downloading Intel secret documents between May 8, 2008, and June 10, 2008, valued by Intel between $200 million and $400 million.

On 8 August 2012 he was sentenced to three years in federal prison and given a fine of US$17,500.

== See also ==
- AMD v. Intel
