= Directive on the Protection of Trade Secrets =

EU law standardizing trade secret protection across member states

The Directive (EU) 2016/943 on the protection of undisclosed know-how and business information (trade secrets) against their unlawful acquisition, use and disclosure is a directive of the European Parliament and the European Council which was adopted by the European Council on 27 May 2016, following an agreement reached with the European Parliament on 15 December 2015, and amendment by the Parliament on 14 March 2016.

The aim of the directive is "to harmonise the existing diverging national laws [within the EU] on the protection against the misappropriation of trade secrets, so that companies can exploit and share their trade secrets with privileged business partners across the internal market, turning their innovative ideas into growth and jobs".

EU member states were required to "bring into force the laws, regulations and administrative provisions necessary to comply with this Directive" within two years i.e. by June 2018. Trade secret holders are entitled to apply for remedies following cases of illegal appropriation of documents, objects, materials, substances or electronic files containing the trade secret or from which the trade secret can be deduced.

The directive allows that trade secrets may be disclosed in good faith where this is done in order to protect the general public interest.

== Text ==
Text of the directive

== See also ==
- German Law on the Protection of Trade Secrets (German: Gesetz zum Schutz von Geschäftsgeheimnissen), implementation of the directive in German law.
