= Defend Trade Secrets Act =

United States federal law

Defend Trade Secrets Act of 2016
- Long title: An Act to amend chapter 90 of title 18, United States Code, to provide Federal jurisdiction for the theft of trade secrets, and for other purposes
- Acronyms (colloquial): DTSA
- Enacted by: the 114th United States Congress
- Effective: May 11, 2016

Citations
- Public law: Pub. L. 114–153 (text) (PDF)
- Statutes at Large: 130 Stat. 376

Legislative history
- Introduced in the Senate as S.1890 by Orrin Hatch (R–UT) on July 29, 2015; Passed the Senate on April 4, 2016 (87-0 Roll call vote 39, via Senate.gov); Passed the House of Representatives on April 27, 2016 (410-2 Roll call vote 172, via Clerk.House.gov); Signed into law by President Barack Obama on May 11, 2016

The Defend Trade Secrets Act of 2016 (DTSA) (Pub. L. 114–153 (text) (PDF), 130 Stat. 376, enacted May 11, 2016, codified at 18 U.S.C. § 1836, et seq.) is a United States federal law that allows an owner of a trade secret to sue in federal court when its trade secrets have been misappropriated. The act was signed into law by President Barack Obama on May 11, 2016. It underscored Congress's desire to align closely with the Uniform Trade Secrets Act, which had been adopted in some form in almost every U.S. state. Technically, the DTSA extended the Economic Espionage Act of 1996, which criminalizes certain trade secret misappropriations.

The law also grants legal immunity to corporate whistleblowers.

After the DTSA's passage by the Senate, Forbes magazine called the law the "Biggest Development in [Intellectual Property] in Years".

== Notable cases ==
The first judicial decision under the DTSA was Henry Schein, Inc. v. Cook, in the United States District Court for the Northern District of California, on June 10, 2016. In that decision, U.S. District Court Judge Jon S. Tigar granted the first temporary restraining order under the DTSA prohibiting an ex-employee from soliciting customers of the plaintiff.

The first verdict under the act came in Dalmatia Import Group, Inc. v. FoodMatch Inc. et al., on February 25, 2017. In that case, a federal jury awarded Dalmatia $2.5 million for misappropriation of trade secrets, trademark infringement and counterfeiting, $500,000 of which was allocated to the DTSA claim. The trade secrets claim was based on Foodmatch's misappropriation of Dalmatia's fig jam recipe.
