= Silvaco Data Systems v. Intel Corp. =

Californian court case on trade secrets

Silvaco Data Systems v. Intel Corporation
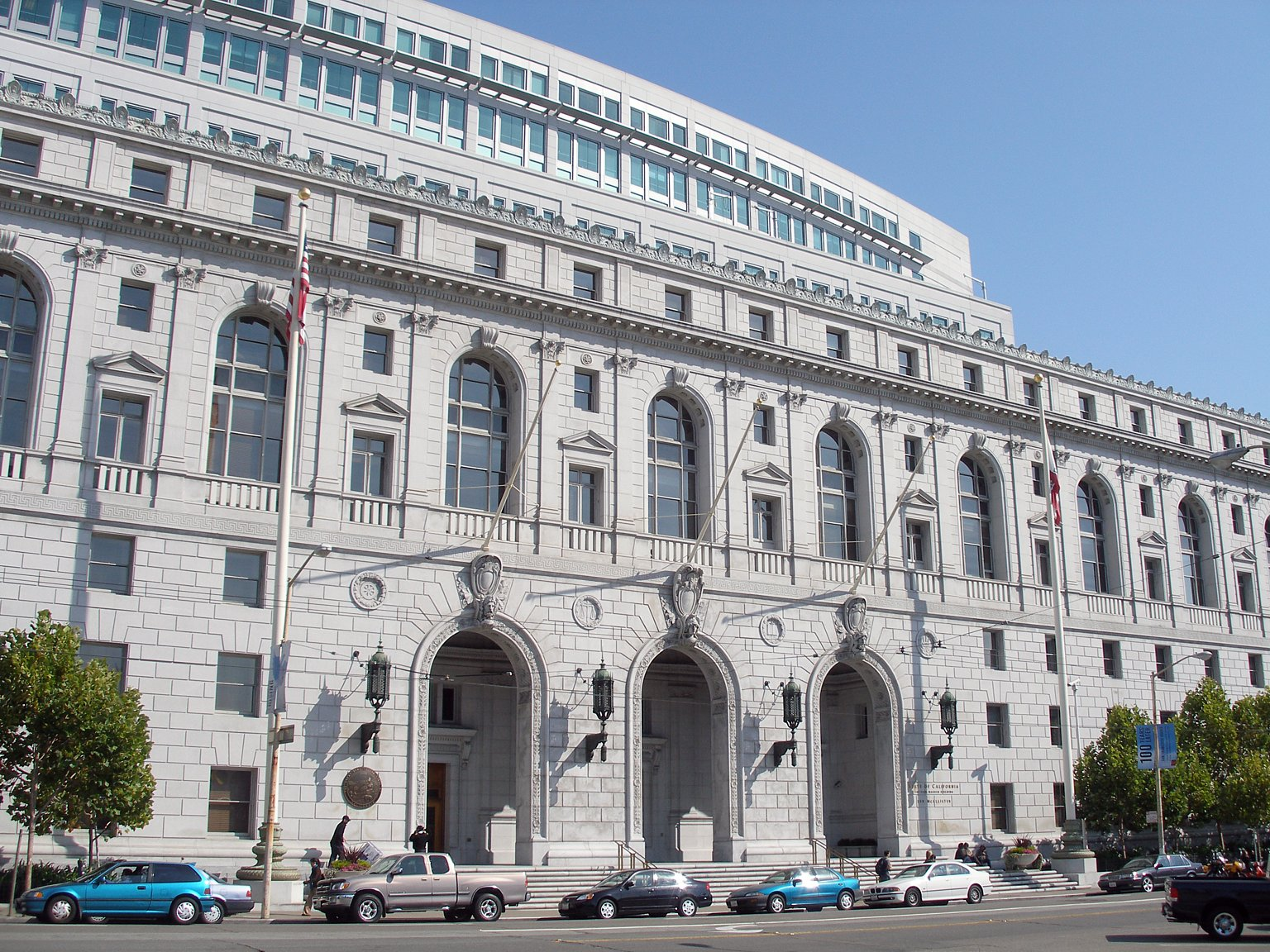
- Court: California Courts of Appeal
- Decided: April 29, 2010
- Citation: 184 Cal. App. 4th 210

Court membership
- Judges sitting: Conrad L. Rushing, Eugene M. Premo, Franklin D. Elia

Case opinions
- Possession of software object code does not constitute misappropriation of trade secrets.
- Decision by: Rushing

Keywords
- trade secrets

Silvaco Data Systems v. Intel Corp was a trade secrets case heard before the California Court of Appeal for the Sixth District. Silvaco sued Intel for misappropriation of trade secrets because Intel used software produced by a third-party that had misappropriated Silvaco's trade secrets. The appeals court affirmed the decision of the trial court to grant summary judgment in favor of Intel, finding that merely using infringing software does not constitute a trade secret infringement in itself.

== Background ==
Silvaco is a California-based company that produces electronic design automation (EDA) software. Silvaco makes several EDA products including SmartSpice, a tool for designing and simulating analog circuits. In December 2000, Silvaco sued Circuit Semantics, Inc. (CSI) for misappropriating Silvaco's trade secrets in the design of DynaSpice, a CSI product that competed with SmartSpice. This case went to trial, where Silvaco eventually prevailed.

Silvaco then sued several customers of CSI that had used DynaSpice, including Intel. Silvaco argued that by using DynaSpice, Intel was guilty of misappropriation of trade secrets under the California Uniform Trade Secrets Act (CUTSA). Intel demurred; that is, they argued that, even if they had used DynaSpice, their use of DynaSpice did not constitute misappropriation of trade secrets. In particular, Intel presented evidence that they only received the object code for DynaSpice, not the source code, and that because object code "does not readily yield its underlying design to human understanding", possession of object code does not imply possession of information that would be protected as a trade secret. The trial court granted summary judgment in favor of Intel, stating that:

By acquiring the CSI software that 'embodies' Silvaco's source code, Intel did not acquire, or gain knowledge of, the information that constitutes Silvaco's alleged trade secret.... It is not the functionality of the CSI software that constitutes Silvaco's alleged trade secret, but Silvaco's means of creating that functionality through the source code.

Silvaco appealed the trial court's decision.

== Opinion of the court ==
The appeals court affirmed the decision of the trial court, granting summary judgment in favor of Intel. Agreeing with the trial court, the appeals court found that Intel never had possession of any trade secrets belonging to Silvaco, which CUTSA defines as one of the criteria for misappropriation of trade secrets. The court distinguished between the "use" of a trade secret—which would constitute an infringement—from the "use" of the software via executing its object code. The court reasoned in part by analogy:

One who bakes a pie from a recipe certainly engages in the "use" of the latter; but one who eats the pie does not, by virtue of that act alone, make "use" of the recipe in any ordinary sense, and this is true even if the baker is accused of stealing the recipe from a competitor, and the diner knows of that accusation. Yet this is substantially the same situation as when one runs software that was compiled from allegedly stolen source code. The source code is the recipe from which the pie (executable program) is baked (compiled).

The court also observed that accepting Silvaco's arguments would have dire policy consequences:

To brand Intel‟s conduct as unethical, we would have to conclude that any end user of a software application must desist from its use—whatever the resulting harm to his own business—the moment anyone claims that the application was compiled from stolen source code. This would be a prescription for the stultification of technological development and of other business activities taking place at a considerable remove, causally and ethically, from the claimed wrong. Far from serving the purposes of trade secrets law, such a rule would make it far too easy to suppress competition and technological development by threatening not only would-be competitors, but also their customers, with litigation of virtually unlimited scope.

== Impact ==
Several commentators observed that the court's decision in this case clarified the application of trade secret law to software. In particular, the court's decision supports the idea that although a program's object code is derived from the program's source code, an individual possessing the object code does not possess any knowledge of any trade secrets embodied in the source code.

The appeals court decision also prompted discussion because of a lengthy footnote contained in the opinion that decried the 8,000 pages of records filed with the court for this case, to which fact Justice Rushing commented: "Seldom have so many trees died for so little".

== See also ==
- Uniform Trade Secrets Act
