= Data General Corp. v. Digital Computer Controls, Inc. =

Data General Corp. v. Digital Computer Controls, Inc. was a 1971 case in which the Delaware Court of Chancery determined that widespread, confidential disclosure of trade secrets does not necessarily compromise their secrecy. Data General Corporation distributed design documentation with its Nova 1200 minicomputer, notifying owners of the confidentiality of these design drawings through contractual agreements and explicit text on the drawings (essentially a shrinkwrap license). After acquiring drawings with a Nova 1200 purchase, Digital Computer Controls designed its own nearly identical minicomputer. Digital Computer Controls maintained that its use of the documentation was proper because Data General Corporation inadequately maintained the secrecy of the design drawings by distributing them to many customers. The court found that Data General Corporation had sufficiently protected the secrecy of the drawings and that Digital Computer Controls was thus in violation of trade secret law for improperly using confidential information.

Such a view of disclosure had been held by previous courts in non-information technology contexts and has become relevant to trade secrets embodied in widely distributed software commonly protected by clickwrap licenses.

== Facts ==
In 1970 Data General Corporation released the Nova 1200, a minicomputer twice as fast as previous models. Upon purchaser's request, Data General Corporation would include with the computer design documentation intended to allow customers to maintain and repair their own computers. These design drawings were annotated as confidential, and customers received a contractual agreement of confidentiality with their purchase. In March 1971, the president of Digital Computer Controls purchased a secondhand Nova 1200 from a third party. Before receiving the computer, Digital Computer Controls requested the accompanying design documentation from the seller and subsequently photocopied the drawings. The drawings explicitly stated that they could not be used to manufacture similar items without the written permission of Data General Corp. Digital Computer Controls then used the design drawings to create the D-116 minicomputer, which the court determined was "substantially identical in design" to the Nova 1200.

== Decision ==
Data General Corporation requested a preliminary injunction barring Digital Computer Controls from selling the D-116 based primarily on a claim of trade secret misappropriation. Digital Computer Controls consequently moved for summary judgment, claiming that Data General Corporation had not adequately protected the secrecy of its proprietary information. The court found that the adequacy of secrecy precautions was not a matter of law and must be determined at trial, thus denying summary judgment. The court also denied Data General Corporation a preliminary injunction, reasoning that even if Data General Corporation won at trial, the duration of injunctive relief should only be as long as necessary to reverse engineer the minicomputer. Thus, issuing a preliminary injunction would grant Data General Corporation the maximum relief it could hope to obtain. This holding was affirmed by the Delaware Supreme Court in 1972.

In 1975, Data General Corporation filed for permanent injunctive relief and damages based on Digital Computer Controls alleged misappropriation of trade secrets. Digital Computer Controls argued again that Data General Corporation took insufficient measures to protect the secrecy of their trade secrets. In determining whether Data General Corporation took adequate measures despite widespread distribution, the court considered several factors: 1) each drawing stated that its contents were confidential, 2) a contractual agreement applied to any order filled by Data General Corporation, 3) such contracts were requisite to sale for every customer, 4) employees and vendors signed confidentiality agreements, and 5) design documents were only available to purchasers of the Nova 1200.

The court found Data General Corporation's secrecy precautions sufficient, securing trade secret status for the design documentation. Accordingly, Data General Corporation could not claim copyright protection of the drawings, as their limited disclosure did not amount to publication, and thus Digital Computer Control's acquisition of the design documentation was appropriate, as the purchaser of a Nova 1200 was entitled to the drawings. However, Digital Computer Controls improperly used the trade secrets when designing the D-116. A permanent injunction was granted to Data General Corporation, and the case for damages was referred to a jury in Superior Court.

== Impact ==
The court's decision that widespread disclosure does not compromise a trade secret has particular implications for widely distributed software. The nature and use of software often requires the customer have access to trade secrets embodied in the software. Clickwrap and shrinkwrap licenses are commonly used to preserve the confidentiality of sensitive material in software. Although in this case the defendant admitted to having seen the confidentiality agreement on the design drawings, the enforceability of clickwrap contracts remains a legal issue. Additionally, the distribution of current software and hardware products far exceeds that of the Nova 1200, which was distributed to between 80 and 6000 customers, leaving open for debate the threshold upon which widespread disclosure indicates public knowledge.
