= E-Trade =

American financial services company

Coordinates: 40.760°N 73.981°W

E*TRADE from Morgan Stanley
- Logo since January 1, 2022
- Type: Subsidiary
- Traded as: Nasdaq: ETFC
- Industry: Financial services
- Founded: 1982; 44 years ago, in Palo Alto, California, U.S.
- Founders: William A. Porter; Bernard A. Newcomb
- Headquarters: Arlington, Virginia, U.S.
- Key people: Mike Pizzi (former CEO)
- Services: Stockbroker; Electronic trading platform
- Parent: Morgan Stanley (2020–present)
- Website: etrade.com

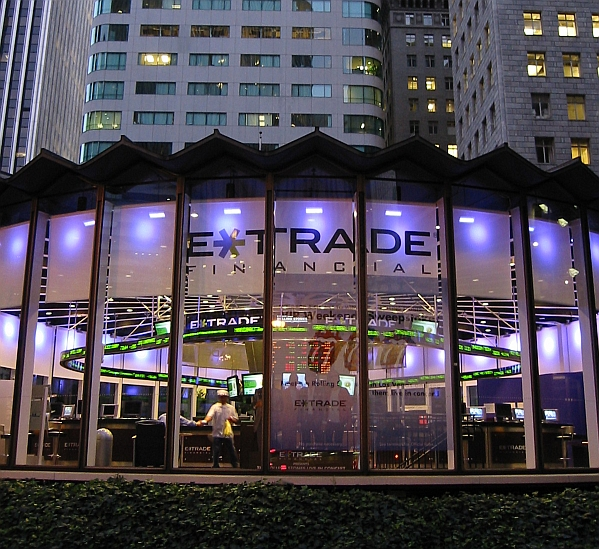
E-Trade Financial Center, San Francisco

E-Trade (stylized as E*TRADE) is an investment brokerage and electronic trading platform that operates as a subsidiary of Morgan Stanley.

== History ==
E-Trade logo from February 3, 2008, to December 31, 2021

In 1982, physicist William A. Porter and Bernard A. Newcomb founded TradePlus in Palo Alto, California, with $15,000 in capital. In 1983, it launched its first trade via a Compuserve network. In 1992, Porter and Newcomb founded E-Trade and made electronic trading available to individual investors.

On August 16, 1996, the company (by then known as the E-Trade Financial Corporation) became a public company via an initial public offering. The company sold 5,665,000 shares of its common stock for $10.50 per share under the stock ticker "ETFC" on the NASDAQ stock exchange. The company figured prominently in the dot-com bubble, as both a way to speculate in internet stocks and an internet stock itself.

In October 2020, the company was acquired by Morgan Stanley.

=== Management history ===
In November 2007, Mitch Caplan resigned as CEO and Citadel LLC received a seat on the board of directors of the company after Citadel invested $2.5 billion in the company to bolster its finances after it suffered losses due to the bursting of the 2000s United States housing bubble.

In March 2008, E-Trade named Donald Layton, formerly JPMorgan Chase vice chairman, its new CEO. Layton had joined E-Trade's board of directors in November 2007, at the same time as the Citadel LLC deal.

In December 2009, Robert Druskin, a former chief operating officer of Citigroup, was named interim CEO and chairman.

On March 22, 2010, Steven Freiberg was named CEO. Freiberg was the former co-CEO of Citigroup's global consumer group and the former head of its credit card unit.

On January 17, 2013, Paul T. Idzik was appointed CEO. Idzik had previously been group chief executive of DTZ and also served ten years at Barclays bank.

In September 2016, Karl A. Roessner, E-Trade's general counsel since 2009, was appointed CEO.

On August 14, 2019, Michael Pizzi was appointed CEO.

== Morgan Stanley acquisition ==
On February 20, 2020, Morgan Stanley announced the acquisition of E-Trade in an all-stock transaction valued at approximately $13 billion, the largest U.S. bank acquisition since the 2008 financial crisis. E*TRADE shareholders received 1.0432 Morgan Stanley shares per E-Trade share, representing a 30.7% premium. The deal closed on October 2, 2020, following Federal Reserve approval. At closing, E-Trade had 5.2 million client accounts and over $360 billion in retail client assets. Between March and September 2023, E-Trade brokerage accounts were migrated to Morgan Stanley systems in phases, with the final wave completed over the Labor Day weekend in September 2023. The E-Trade brand was retained, operating as "E*TRADE from Morgan Stanley."

== Products and services ==
E-Trade offers commission-free trading on U.S.-listed stocks, exchange-traded funds, and options since October 2019. In December 2022, the platform eliminated all mutual fund commissions and early redemption fees, providing access to over 4,400 no-transaction-fee mutual funds. In December 2024, E-Trade announced five proprietary zero-expense-ratio index funds exclusive to its platform. Through Morgan Stanley at Work, E-Trade administers equity compensation plans for approximately 40% of S&P 500 companies and 60% of Nasdaq-100 companies, serving over 24,000 corporate clients and approximately 12 million workplace participants.

== Technology ==
E-Trade operates three trading platforms: E*TRADE Web for mainstream investors, Power E*TRADE for advanced web and mobile trading, and Power E*TRADE Pro, a downloadable desktop platform launched in July 2025 offering up to six custom workspaces with 120 charting tools across multiple monitors. In September 2025, Morgan Stanley announced plans to offer cryptocurrency trading through E-Trade in the first half of 2026, partnering with Zerohash for liquidity, custody, and settlement infrastructure. The offering is expected to include Bitcoin, Ethereum, and Solana.

== Financial performance ==
As of the end of 2024, E-Trade's self-directed channel held $1.4 trillion in client assets, a 25% increase year-over-year, serving more than 8 million households. By 2025, self-directed assets rose to $1.67 trillion. In March 2026, Morgan Stanley's IRA assets under management surpassed $1 trillion, growing at a 15.8% compound annual growth rate since 2022.

== Regulatory actions ==
In January 2022, the Financial Industry Regulatory Authority (FINRA) censured E-Trade Securities and imposed a $350,000 fine for failing to adequately monitor for potentially manipulative trading, including wash trades and end-of-day price manipulation, over a period from February 2016 through November 2021. In September 2022, Morgan Stanley paid $125 million to settle SEC and CFTC charges as part of an industry-wide enforcement action against 16 Wall Street firms for employees' widespread use of WhatsApp, text messages, and personal email for business communications without preserving records, in violation of federal securities recordkeeping laws.

== Advertising ==
In 2007, E-Trade introduced its talking baby campaign in which comedian Pete Holmes was the voice of the baby and Steve Burns was the voice of the announcer.

== Acquisitions and divestitures ==
Date	Acquisition / Divestiture	Company	Ref.
January 2000	Acquisition	Telebanc	
May 2001	Acquisition	Web Street Securities	
August 2005	Acquisition	Harrisdirect	
October 2005	Acquisition	Brown & Company	
July 2007	Divestiture	Australian division	
September 2008	Divestiture	Canadian division	
September 2016	Acquisition	OptionsHouse	
April 2018	Acquisition	Trust Company of America	
December 2019	Acquisition	Gradifi	

== See also ==
- Ajaxo Inc. v. E*Trade Financial Corp.
- Merrill Lynch, Pierce, Fenner & Smith Inc. v. Manning, a 2016 Supreme Court case involving naked short-selling claims against E-Trade, Merrill Lynch, and others, resolved in the defendant's favor
- List of electronic trading platforms
