= Advanced Micro Devices, Inc. v. Intel Corp. =

Private antitrust lawsuit

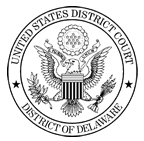
- Court: United States District Court for the District of Delaware
- Full case name: In re Intel Corp. Microprocessor Antitrust Litigation
- Docket nos.: 1:05-cv-00441 1:05-md-01717
- Citation: 496 F. Supp. 2d 404 (D. Del. 2007)

Case history
- Prior actions: Consolidated, In re Intel Corp. Microprocessor Antitrust Litig., 403 F. Supp. 2d 1356 (J.P.M.L. 2005)

Court membership
- Judge sitting: Joseph James Farnan Jr.

AMD v. Intel was a private antitrust lawsuit, filed in the United States by Advanced Micro Devices ("AMD") against Intel Corporation in June 2005. It concluded with a settlement reached between the two companies in December 2009. The case should not be confused with a previous lawsuit filed by AMD against Intel in April 1987 which concluded in December 1994.

== History ==
AMD launched the lawsuit against its rival Intel, the world's leading microprocessor manufacturer. AMD has claimed that Intel engaged in unfair competition by offering rebates to Japanese PC manufacturers who agreed to eliminate or limit purchases of microprocessors made by AMD or a smaller manufacturer, Transmeta.

The complaint was filed in the United States District Court for the District of Delaware in June 2005. The case was consolidated with thirteen other antitrust suits against Intel by the Judicial Panel on Multidistrict Litigation in November 2005. In July 2007, U.S. District Judge Joseph James Farnan Jr. largely denied Intel's motion to dismiss. The court date, originally scheduled for April 2009, was pushed back to February 2010.

In February 2009 it was reported that Intel had spent at least $116 million to date on legal representation on the antitrust suit. This was inferred from a $50 million lawsuit filed by Intel against one of its insurers; the lawsuit disclosed that Intel had already exhausted $66 million in coverage from two other insurers while fighting the antitrust lawsuit.

Federal Trade Commission Chairwoman Deborah Platt Majoras blocked an inquiry into the matter until her departure in March 2008. In June 2008, new FTC Chairman William Kovacic opened an investigation.

This was not the first time AMD has accused Intel Corp. of abusing their power as the leading manufacturer for x86 processors. In 1991, AMD filed an antitrust lawsuit against Intel claiming that they were trying to secure and maintain a monopoly. One year later, a court ruled against Intel, awarding AMD $10 million "plus a royalty-free license to any Intel patents used in AMD's own x86-style processor".

== Agreement ==
In November 2009, Intel agreed to pay AMD $1.25 billion as part of a deal to settle all outstanding legal disputes between the two companies.

That week, Andrew Cuomo, then the Attorney General of New York, who had access to the 200 million documents in discovery and 2,200 hours of witness depositions from the private lawsuit, filed another antitrust lawsuit under similar allegations. That lawsuit was ultimately settled in 2012 by Cuomo's successor for $6.5 million.

In December 2009, the FTC sued Intel. On August 4, 2010, FTC Chairman Jon Leibowitz reached a settlement agreement with Intel in which the company agreed to modify its rebate practices and establish a $10 million fund for misled customers.

== International actions ==
In 2005, the Japan Fair Trade Commission issued Intel a cease and desist order. On June 4, 2008, Korea Fair Trade Commission fined Intel US$25.4 million for giving Samsung rebates to not use AMD processors. Some of the manufacturers involved in the case were Dell, HP, Gateway, Acer, Fujitsu, Sony, Toshiba, and Hitachi.

In May 2009, the European Commissioner for Competition, Neelie Kroes, fined Intel a record $1.45 billion (€1.06 billion) and ordered it to end its customer rebate program.

In 2022 the €1.06 billion fine was dropped, but was successively re-imposed in September 2023 as a €376.36 million fine.
