= Uniform Trade Secrets Act =

Uniform act in the United States

The Uniform Trade Secrets Act (UTSA), published by the Uniform Law Commission (ULC) in 1979 and amended in 1985, is a model law designed for adoption by U.S. states. It was developed to resolve inconsistencies in the treatment of trade secrets across different states.

The UTSA provides unitary definitions for "trade secret" and "trade secret misappropriation" and establishes a single statute of limitations, replacing the varied property, quasi-contractual, and fiduciary liability frameworks previously applied under common law.

To date, 49 states, the District of Columbia, Puerto Rico, and the U.S. Virgin Islands have adopted the UTSA, with New York as the remaining exception.

== Motivation ==
A prefatory note to the UTSA states some original motivations for the act:

A valid patent provides a legal monopoly for seventeen years in exchange for public disclosure of an invention.

If, however, the courts ultimately decide that the Patent Office improperly issued a patent, an invention has been disclosed to competitors with no corresponding benefit.

In view of the substantial number of patents that the courts invalidate, many businesses now elect to protect commercially valuable information by relying on the state trade secret protection law.

— Uniform Trade Secrets Act, Prefatory Note

The UTSA made note of the commercial value and competitive advantages inherent in trade secrets. Unlike patent protection, which was addressed at the federal level, trade secret misappropriation was addressed at the state level.

In the United States there existed a prevalence of interstate commercial transactions that extended beyond the jurisdiction of individual state legislation. For example, goods may have been manufactured in State A, warehoused in State B, sold from State C, and delivered in State D.

As a result, the UTSA sought to alleviate the uneven development and "uncertainty concerning the parameters of trade secret protection" by recommending a uniform trade secret law and, at the same time, allowing the states the flexibility to meet local circumstances by modifying the text as enacted in each state.

In addition to providing some recourse for any uncertainty associated with a patent, the UTSA also serves to codify the common law remedies that have emerged in many states. These remedies are based on legal precedent set by previous cases, and therefore allow for greater uncertainty, particularly in less industrial states where there have been fewer trade secret cases.

The UTSA notes that any confusion caused by having strictly common law remedies to trade secret misappropriation was exacerbated by omitting trade secret rules from the second edition of the Restatement of Torts.

== Overview ==
The UTSA contained a prefatory note followed by 12 sections of proposed law. Each section was followed by a "comments" section that provided clarifications and examples as to the intent of the law. Section 1 presented definitions of key terms as they are used throughout the act. Sections 2–4 provided remedies for potential wrongs committed in violation of the act, including injunctive relief, damages and attorney's fees. Sections 5–12 made additional provisions related to the implementation of the law, and the relationship to other laws.

=== Key definitions ===
The UTSA provided several definitions of terms as they are used throughout the act. Some of these definitions are replicated here for the benefit of the reader.

UTSA § 1.1

"Improper means" includes theft, bribery, misrepresentation, breach or inducement of a breach of a duty to maintain secrecy, or espionage through electronic or other means.

Although not included in the definition itself, the original text of the UTSA provided clarification regarding the definition of proper and improper means. The comments refined the definition by listing several proper means of discovery, including discovery by independent invention, reverse engineering, licensing arrangement, and published literature. The comments also clarified that improper means included actions that were, "improper under the circumstances; e.g., an airplane overflight used as aerial reconnaissance to determine the competitor's plant layout during construction of the plant".

UTSA § 1.2

"Misappropriation" means:

(i) acquisition of a trade secret of another by a person who knows or has reason to know that the trade secret was acquired by improper means; or
(ii) disclosure or use of a trade secret of another without express or implied consent by a person who

(A) used improper means to acquire knowledge of the trade secret; or
(B) at the time of disclosure or use, knew or had reason to know that his knowledge of the trade secret was

(I) derived from or through a person who had utilized improper means to acquire it;
(II) acquired under circumstances giving rise to a duty to maintain its secrecy or limit its use; or
(III) derived from or through a person who owed a duty to the person seeking relief to maintain its secrecy or limit its use; or

(C) before a material change of his [or her] position, knew or had reason to know that it was a trade secret and that knowledge of it had been acquired by accident or mistake.

The UTSA noted that the types of accidents or mistakes that would lead to use of a learned trade secret being misappropriated did not include actions or mistakes that "constitute a failure of efforts that are reasonable under circumstances to maintain its [the trade secret's] secrecy".

UTSA § 1.4

"Trade secret" means information, including a formula, pattern, compilation, program, device, method, technique, or process, that:

(i) derives independent economic value, actual or potential, from not being generally known to, and not being readily ascertainable by proper means by, other persons who can obtain economic value from its disclosure or use, and
(ii) is the subject of efforts that are reasonable under the circumstances to maintain its secrecy.

The UTSA also provided refinement through comments to the definition of a trade secret itself:

- Multiple parties may hold rights to the same trade secret, as they may all individually derive value from it.
- A trade secret ceases to exist when it is common knowledge within the community in which it is profitable. This means that the secret does not need to be known by the general public, but only throughout the industry that stands to profit from it.
- A party that reverse engineers a trade secret may also obtain trade secret protection for their knowledge, provided the reverse engineering process is non-trivial.
- Knowledge preventing loss of funds, such as that a particular idea does not work, is valuable and as such qualifies for trade secret protection.

Regarding reasonable efforts to maintain secrecy, the UTSA maintained that actions such as restricting access to a "need-to-know basis" and informing employees that the information is secret met the criteria for reasonable efforts. The UTSA stated that the courts do not require procedures to protect against "flagrant industrial espionage" were not necessary.

=== Remedies ===
The UTSA provided for several potential remedies for wrongs committed under the act, including injunctive relief, damages, and attorney's fees.

==== Injunctive relief ====
Section 2 of the UTSA provided for injunctive relief from trade secret misappropriation. Section 2(a) stipulated, "Actual or threatened misappropriation may be enjoined". However, the length of the injunction was limited to the length of time the trade secret exists (i.e., remains unknown to some party who could profit from knowing the secret) plus sufficient time to eliminate any competitive advantage that could have been obtained by misappropriation of the trade secret.

In addition to the possible enjoinment described in section 2(a), section 2(b) allowed for the payment of reasonable royalties in place of an injunction under exceptional circumstances. The UTSA, in the comments for section 2, referenced a court case in which a misappropriated trade secret was used to build military technology for use during the Vietnam War. As an injunction may have prevented necessary equipment from reaching U.S. armed forces, the judge ordered that the misappropriator pay an appropriate royalty to the trade secret owner rather than imposing an injunction.

==== Damages ====
In addition to injunctive relief offered under the UTSA, parties may also receive damages. Section 3(a) states that, "Damages can include both the actual loss caused by misappropriation and the unjust enrichment caused by misappropriation that is not taken into account in computing actual loss". Furthermore, the act stated in section 3(b) that if misappropriation is, "willful and malicious" the court may award damages up to twice what would otherwise be entitled under section 3(a). Restrictions similar to those imposed on the duration of injunctive relief are imposed on the duration of damages as well.

==== Attorney's fees ====
Section 4 of the UTSA stipulated that the court may award attorney's fees to the prevailing party for actions made in "bad faith or willful and malicious misappropriation".

=== Other provisions ===
- Section 5 provided for the "preservation of secrecy"; namely that a court should take reasonable means to protect a trade secret during any legal action concerning the trade secret. These secretive measures can include sealing records and gag orders.
- Section 6 provided a statute of limitations, requiring that any action under the UTSA must be "brought within 3 years after the misappropriation is discovered or by the exercise of reasonable diligence should have been discovered".
- Section 7 stated that the UTSA superseded any existing "... tort, restitutionary, and other law of this State providing civil remedies for misappropriation of a trade secret". The section also made clear that the UTSA did not affect (1) contractual remedies, (2) civil remedies not based on trade secret misappropriation, or (3) criminal remedies, which may otherwise be of use to the aggrieved party.
- Section 8 stated the goal of making trade secret law uniform among states enacting the UTSA.
- Section 9 provided a short title to refer to the act and section 10 described the severability of the act.
- Sections 11 and 12 provided a date when the act took effect and the opportunity to explicitly list other acts to be repealed.

== Adoption by U.S. states ==
As of June 2019, the UTSA has been adopted by all states except New York and North Carolina (but its law is very similar and seems to borrow heavily from the act ). On May 2, 2013, Texas enacted Senate Bill 953, becoming the 47th state to adopt the UTSA. The Texas statute took effect on September 1, 2013.

Massachusetts adopted the Uniform Trade Secrets Act effective October 1, 2018.

The UTSA has also been adopted in the District of Columbia, Puerto Rico, and the U.S. Virgin Islands. States are not required to pass the act exactly as is, and some have made amendments.

== Notable cases ==
The following cases have directly referenced the UTSA:

- Rivendell Forest Prods. v. Georgia-Pacific Corp. (10th Cir. 1994)
- Comprehensive Techs. Int'l v. Software Artisans, Inc. (4th Cir. 1993)
- DVD Copy Control Association v. Bunner (Cal. App. 1994)
- Ajaxo v. E*Trade Financial Corp. (Cal. App. 2010)
- Silvaco Data Systems v. Intel Corp. (Cal. App. 2010)
- R.C. Olmstead, Inc. v. CU Interface (N.D. Ohio 2009)
- Justmed v. Byce (9th Cir. 2010)
- Decision Insights, Inc. v. Sentia Group, Inc. (4th Cir. 2011)
- Cypress Semiconductor Corp. v. Superior Court (Cal. App. 2008)
- NCR v. Warner (S.D. Ohio 2008)
- Othentec v. Phelan (4th Cir. 2008)
- Southern Nuclear Operating Co. v. Elec. Data Sys. Corp. (11th Cir. 2008)

== International application ==
Trade secret law varies more from country to country.

The North American Free Trade Agreement (NAFTA) has provisions providing for uniform minimum standards for protecting trade secrets.

Each party shall provide the legal means for any person to prevent trade secrets from being disclosed to, acquire by, or used by others without the consent of the person lawfully in control of the information in a manner contrary to honest commercial practices, in so far as:

— NAFTA Article 1711(1)

Trade Secrets in Europe are dealt with on a country-by-country basis. In England and Wales, trade secret protection is predicated upon the common law concept of "breach of confidence"—i.e., regardless of the existence of a contract, those who obtain the trade secret in confidence shall not take unfair advantage of it without consent.

Germany's Act Against Unfair Competition states, "any person who, in the course of business activity for purposes of competition, commits acts contrary to honest practices" and hold violators responsible for damages.

== See also ==
- Defend Trade Secrets Act
- Economic Espionage Act of 1996
- Glossary of legal terms in technology
- Biswamohan Pani, charged in 2008 with stealing $1 billion worth of trade secrets from Intel
- Data General Corp. v. Digital Computer Controls, Inc. addressing secrecy given widespread disclosure
- Non-disclosure agreement
- PhoneDog v. Kravitz addressing whether social media accounts could constitute trade secrets
- Trade secret
- The Case for a Federal Trade Secrets Act
- Ajaxo Inc. v. E*Trade Financial Corp.
