= Trade secret =

Business information kept secret to gain or maintain a competitive advantage

A trade secret is a type of intellectual property that protects a formula, process, or other business information that is valuable because it is not generally known or readily ascertainable and that the owner keeps secret in order to maintain a competitive advantage. Well-known examples of trade secrets include the formula for Coca-Cola, the recipe for Kentucky Fried Chicken, and the formula for Zildjian bronze cymbals.

Unlike other forms of intellectual property, trade secrets normally do not require formal registration, and they can remain protected indefinitely as long as they continue to meet the legal requirements for trade secret status. Instead, non-disclosure agreements (NDAs), among other measures, are commonly used to keep the information secret.

Like other IP assets, trade secrets may be sold or licensed. Unauthorized acquisition, use, or disclosure of a trade secret by others in a manner contrary to honest commercial practices is considered misappropriation of the trade secret. If trade secret misappropriation happens, the trade secret holder can seek various legal remedies.

== Definition ==
The exact definition of a trade secret varies from country to country, as do the types of information eligible for trade secret protection. However, trade secrets are usually defined to be confidential information that is:

- not generally known among or accessible to individuals within the relevant business sector;
- commercially valuable because it is secret; and
- subject to reasonable steps taken by the rightful holder of the information to keep it secret.

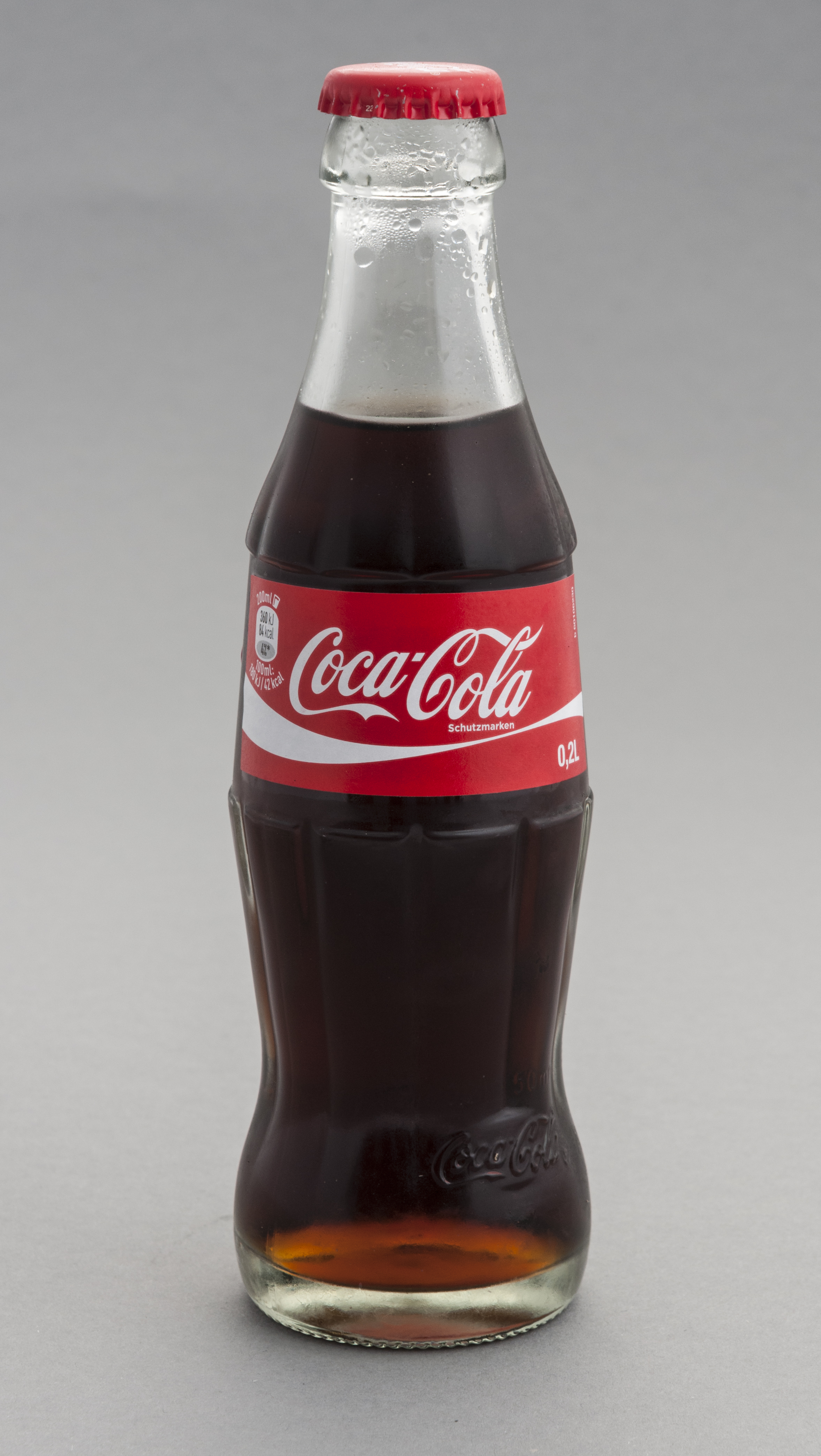
The Coca-Cola formula has been a trade secret since 1891.

All three elements are required. If any element ceases to exist, then the trade secret will also cease to exist.

Trade secret protection covers confidential information, which can include technical and scientific data, business and commercial information, and financial records. Even "negative" information, like failed experiments, can be valuable by helping companies avoid repeating costly mistakes.

In international law, while "trade secrets" and "confidential information" are often used interchangeably, trade secrets are technically a subset of confidential information. To qualify as a trade secret, confidential information must meet the specific requirements set by a country's national laws, which are often influenced by Article 39 of the TRIPS Agreement.

== History ==
=== Early origins ===
Commentators like A. Arthur Schiller have argued that trade secrets were protected under Roman law by a claim known as actio servi corrupti, meaning an "action for making a slave worse" or "an action for corrupting a servant". The Roman law is described as follows:

[T]he Roman owner of a mark or firm name was legally protected against unfair usage by a competitor through the actio servi corrupti ... which the Roman jurists used to grant commercial relief under the guise of private law actions. "If, as the writer believes [writes Schiller], various private cases of action were available in satisfying commercial needs, the state was acting in exactly the same fashion as it does at the present day."

The suggestion that trade secret law has its roots in Roman law was introduced in 1929 in a Columbia Law Review article called "Trade Secrets and the Roman Law: The Actio Servi Corrupti", which has been reproduced in Schiller's, An American Experience in Roman Law 1 (1971).

However, the University of Georgia Law School professor Alan Watson argued in Trade Secrets and Roman Law: The Myth Exploded that the actio servi corrupti was not used to protect trade secrets. Rather, he explained:

Schiller is sadly mistaken as to what was going on. ... The actio servi corrupti presumably or possibly could be used to protect trade secrets and other similar commercial interests. That was not its purpose and was, at most, an incidental spin-off. But there is not the slightest evidence that the action was ever so used. In this regard the actio servi corrupti is not unique. Exactly the same can be said of many private law actions including those for theft, damage to property, deposit, and production of property. All of these could, I suppose, be used to protect trade secrets, etc., but there is no evidence they were. It is bizarre to see any degree the Roman actio servi corrupti as the counterpart of modern law for the protection of trade secrets and other such commercial interests.

=== Early case law ===
Modern trade secret law is primarily rooted in Anglo-American common law. The earliest recorded court case was the 1817 English case Newbery v. James, which involved a secret formula for gout treatment. In the United States, this concept was first recognized in the 1837 case Vickery v. Welch, involving the sale of a chocolate factory and the seller’s agreement to keep the secret recipe confidential.

Newbery and Vickery only awarded compensation for losses (damages) and did not issue orders to prevent the misuse of secrets (injunctive relief). The first English case involving injunctive relief was Yovatt v. Winyard in 1820, where the court issued an injunction to prevent a former employee from using or disclosing recipes he had secretly copied from his employer's veterinary medicine practice.

In the United States, the 1868 Massachusetts Supreme Court decision in Peabody v. Norfolk is one of the most well-known and well-reasoned early trade secret cases, as it established foundational legal principles that continue to be central to common law. In this case, the court ruled that Peabody’s confidential manufacturing process was a protectable trade secret and issued an injunction preventing former employees from using or disclosing it after they shared it with a competitor.

=== Uniform lawmaking and legislation ===
In 1939, the Restatement of Torts, published by the American Law Institute, offered, among other things, one of the earliest formal definitions of a trade secret. According to Section 757, Comment b, a trade secret may consist of "any formula, pattern, device, or compilation of information which is used in one's business, and which gives the business an opportunity to obtain an advantage over competitors who do not know or use it". This definition became widely used by courts across the United States. As the first attempt to outline the accepted principles of trade secret law, the Restatement served as the primary authority adopted in virtually every reported case.

Trade secret law saw further development in 1979 when the Uniform Law Commission (ULC) introduced a model law known as the Uniform Trade Secrets Act (UTSA), which was later amended in 1985. The UTSA defines the types of information eligible for trade secret protection, establishes a private cause of action for misappropriation, and outlines remedies such as injunctions, damages, and, in certain cases, attorneys' fees. It has since been adopted by 48 states, along with the District of Columbia, Puerto Rico, and the U.S. Virgin Islands, with New York and North Carolina as the exceptions.

The UTSA influenced the Defend Trade Secrets Act (DTSA) of 2016, which created a federal civil cause of action for trade secret misappropriation, allowing plaintiffs to file cases directly in federal courts if "the trade secret is related to a product or service used in ... interstate or foreign commerce".

=== International standards ===
Trade secret law is governed by national legal systems. However, international standards for protecting secrets (called “undisclosed information”) were established as part of the TRIPS Agreement in 1995. Article 39 of TRIPS obligates member countries to protect “undisclosed information” from unauthorized use conducted “in a manner contrary to honest commercial practices,” including actions such as breach of contract, breach of confidence, and unfair competition. For the information to qualify, it must not be generally known or easily accessible, must hold value due to its secrecy, and must be safeguarded through “reasonable steps” to keep it secret.

== Value ==
Trade secrets are an important, but invisible component of a company's intellectual property (IP). Their contribution to a company's value can be major. Being invisible, that contribution is hard to measure. Still, research shows that changes in trade secrets laws affect business spending on R&D and patents. This research provides indirect evidence of the value of trade secrecy.

== Protection ==
Unlike other forms of intellectual property, trade secrets do not require formal registration and can be protected indefinitely, as long as they remain secret. Maintaining secrecy is both a practical necessity and a legal obligation, as trade secret owners must take "reasonable" measures to protect the confidentiality of their trade secrets to qualify for legal protection. "Reasonable" efforts are decided case by case, considering factors like the type and value of the secret, its importance to the business, the company’s size, and its organizational complexity.

The most common reason for trade secret disputes to arise is when former employees of trade secret-bearing companies leave to work for a competitor and are suspected of taking or using valuable confidential information belonging to their former employer. Legal protections include non-disclosure agreements (NDAs), and work-for-hire and non-compete clauses. In other words, in exchange for an opportunity to be employed by the holder of secrets, an employee may agree to not reveal their prospective employer's proprietary information, to surrender or assign to their employer ownership rights to intellectual work and work-products produced during the course (or as a condition) of employment, and to not work for a competitor for a given period of time (sometimes within a given geographic region).

Violating the agreement generally carries the possibility of heavy financial penalties, thus disincentivizing the revealing of trade secrets. Trade secret information can be protected through legal action including an injunction preventing breaches of confidentiality, monetary damages, and, in some instances, punitive damages and attorneys’ fees too. In extraordinary circumstances, an ex parte seizure under the Defend Trade Secrets Act (DTSA) also allows for the court to seize property to prevent the propagation or dissemination of the trade secret.

However, proving a breach of an NDA by a former stakeholder who is legally working for a competitor or prevailing in a lawsuit for breaching a non-compete clause can be very difficult. A holder of a trade secret may also require similar agreements from other parties, such as vendors, licensees, and board members.

As a company can protect its confidential information through NDA, work-for-hire, and non-compete contracts with its stakeholders (within the constraints of employment law, including only restraint that is reasonable in geographic- and time-scope), these protective contractual measures effectively create a monopoly on secret information that does not expire as would a patent or copyright. The lack of formal protection associated with registered intellectual property rights, however, means that a third party not bound by a signed agreement is not prevented from independently duplicating and using the secret information once it is discovered, such as through reverse engineering.

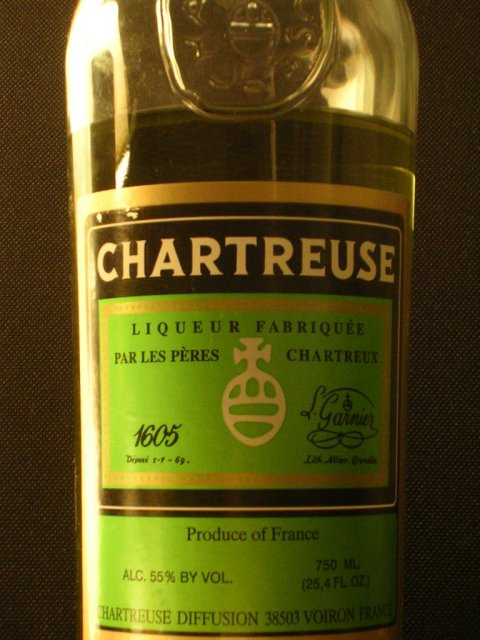
Green Chartreuse liqueur protected by confidential information of the ingredients

Therefore, trade secrets such as secret formulas are often protected by restricting the key information to a few trusted individuals. Famous examples of products protected by trade secrets are Chartreuse liqueur and Coca-Cola.

Because protection of trade secrets can, in principle, extend indefinitely, it may provide an advantage over patent protection and other registered intellectual property rights, which last for a limited duration. For example, the Coca-Cola company has no patent for the formula of Coca-Cola and has been effective in protecting it for many more years than the 20 years of protection that a patent would have provided. In fact, Coca-Cola refused to reveal its trade secret under at least two judges' orders.

Trade secret legal protection can reduce the knowledge spillover, which enhances the knowledge spread and technology improvement. Therefore, while trade secret laws strengthen R&D exclusivity and encourage firms to engage in innovative activities, broadly reducing knowledge spillovers can harm economic growth.

== Misappropriation ==
In general, trade secret "misappropriation" occurs when someone improperly acquires, discloses, or uses a trade secret without the trade secret holder's consent. Common scenarios include former employees taking proprietary data to a new employer in violation of non-disclosure agreements (NDAs), espionage, or unauthorized disclosure.

To prove misappropriation, the trade secret holder must generally show (subject to the specific requirements of the applicable jurisdiction) that:

- the misappropriated information matches the trade secret, and
- the unlawful, improper, or dishonest methods used by the misappropriator, such as breaching confidentiality agreements, violating duties of confidentiality arising from special relationships (e.g., employer-employee), engaging in industrial espionage, hacking, coercion, or inducing others to breach their confidentiality obligations.

== Exceptions and limitations ==
While the improper, dishonest, or unlawful acquisition, use, or disclosure of trade secret information by unauthorized third parties is generally prohibited, there are exceptions to this rule. The scope of these exceptions and limitations varies across jurisdictions:

- Independent discovery or development of the same information by a third party.
- Reverse engineering, acquisition of information through reverse engineering from examining a product placed in the market. In some countries though, a contract (such as a purchase agreement) may forbid to carry out reverse engineering.
- Employee’s general skills and experience acquired from the normal course of work with other employers.
- Public interest and national security per statutory law or case law in some countries.
- Whistleblowing when revealing misconduct, wrongdoing or illegal activity.

== By nation ==
=== Commonwealth nations ===
In Commonwealth common law jurisdictions, confidentiality and trade secrets are regarded as an equitable right rather than a property right.

The Court of Appeal of England and Wales in the case of Saltman Engineering Co Ltd v. Campbell Engineering Ltd held that the action for breach of confidence is based on a principle of preserving "good faith".

The test for a cause of action for breach of confidence in the common law world is set out in the case of Coco v. A.N. Clark (Engineers) Ltd:

- The information itself must have the necessary quality of confidence about it;
- That information must have been imparted in circumstances imparting an obligation of confidence;
- There must be an unauthorized use of that information to the detriment of the party communicating it.

The "quality of confidence" highlights that trade secrets are a legal concept. With sufficient effort or through illegal acts (such as breaking and entering), competitors can usually obtain trade secrets. However, so long as the owner of the trade secret can prove that reasonable efforts have been made to keep the information confidential, the information remains a trade secret and generally remains legally protected. Conversely, trade secret owners who cannot evidence reasonable efforts at protecting confidential information risk losing the trade secret, even if the information is obtained by competitors illegally. It is for this reason that trade secret owners shred documents and do not simply recycle them.

A successful plaintiff is entitled to various forms of judicial relief, including:

- An injunction
- An account of profits or an award of damages
- A declaration

Hong Kong does not follow the traditional commonwealth approach, instead recognizing trade secrets where a judgment of the High Court indicates that confidential information may be a property right.

=== European Union ===
The EU adopted a Directive on the Protection of Trade Secrets on 27 May 2016. The goal of the directive is to harmonize the definition of trade secrets in accordance with existing international standards, and the means of obtaining protection of trade secrets within the EU.

Unlike other protections, like in the US, the trade secrets in the EU are not absolutely seen as an IP right, as it gives the holder no exclusive rights. It is more a protection against the unfair use or publication of the secret information.

=== United States ===
In the United States, trade secrets generally encompass a company's proprietary information that is not generally known to its competitors, and which provides the company with a competitive advantage.

Although trade secrets law evolved under state common law, prior to 1974, the question of whether patent law preempted state trade secrets law had been unanswered. In 1974, the United States Supreme Court issued the landmark decision, Kewanee Oil Co. v. Bicron Corp., which resolved the question in favor of allowing the states to freely develop their own trade secret laws.

In 1979, several U.S. states adopted the Uniform Trade Secrets Act (UTSA), which was further amended in 1985, with approximately 47 states having adopted some variation of it as the basis for trade secret law. Another significant development is the Economic Espionage Act (EEA) of 1996 (18 U.S.C. §§ 1831–1839), which makes the theft or misappropriation of a trade secret a federal crime.

This law contains two provisions criminalizing two sorts of activity:

1. 18 U.S.C. § 1831(a), criminalizes the theft of trade secrets to benefit foreign powers.
2. 18 U.S.C. § 1832, criminalizes their theft for commercial or economic purposes.

The statutory penalties are different for the two offenses. The EEA was extended in 2016 to allow companies to file civil suits in federal court.

On May 11, 2016, President Obama signed the Defend Trade Secrets Act (DTSA), 18 U.S.C. §§ 1839 et seq., which for the first time created a federal cause of action for misappropriating trade secrets. The DTSA provides for both a private right of action for damages and injunction and a civil action for injunction brought by the Attorney General.

The statute followed state laws on liability in significant part, defining trade secrets in the same way as the Uniform Trade Secrets Act as,

"all forms and types of financial, business, scientific, technical, economic, or engineering information, including patterns, plans, compilations, program devices, formulas, designs, prototypes, methods, techniques, processes, procedures, programs, or codes, whether tangible or intangible, and whether or how stored, compiled, or memorialized physically, electronically, graphically, photographically, or in writing if (A) the owner thereof has taken reasonable measures to keep such information secret; and (B) the information derives independent economic value, actual or potential, from not being generally known to, and not being readily ascertainable through proper means by, another person who can obtain economic value from the disclosure or use of the information."

However, the law contains several important differences from prior law:

1. Because it is a federal law, trade secret cases can be prosecuted in federal courts with concomitant procedural advantages.
2. It provides for the unusual remedy of preliminary seizure of "property necessary to prevent the propagation or dissemination of the trade secret," 18 U.S.C. §1836
3. It provides for remedies to include royalties in appropriate cases and exemplary damages up to two times the actual damages in cases of "willful and malicious" appropriation, 18 U.S.C. §1836(b)(3).

The DTSA also clarifies that a United States resident (including a company) can be liable for misappropriation that takes place outside the United States, and any person can be liable as long as an act in furtherance of the misappropriation takes place in the United States, 18 U.S.C. §1837. The DTSA provides the courts with broad injunctive powers. 18 U.S.C. §1836(b)(3).

The DTSA does not preempt or supplant state laws, but provides an additional cause of action. Because states vary significantly in their approach to the "inevitable disclosure" doctrine, its use has limited, if any, application under the DTSA, 18 U.S.C.§1836(b)(3)(A).

== Comparison to other intellectual property laws ==
In the United States, trade secrets are not protected by law in the same way as patents or trademarks. While the U.S. Constitution explicitly authorizes the existence of and the federal jurisdiction over patents and copyrights, it is silent on trade secrets, trademarks, etc. For this reason, Federal Law for the latter types of intellectual property is based on the Commerce Clause (rather than the Copyright Clause) under a theory, that these IP types are used for interstate commerce. On other hand, the application of the Interstate Commerce Theory did not find much judicial support in regulating trade secrets: since a trade secret process is used in a State, where it is protected by state law, federal protection may be needed only when industrial espionage by a foreign entity is involved (given that the States themselves cannot regulate commerce with foreign powers).

Due to these Constitutional requirements, trademarks and patents enjoy a strong federal protection in the USA (the Lanham Act and Patent Act, respectively), while trade secrets usually have to rely on more limited state laws. Most states have adopted the Uniform Trade Secrets Act (UTSA), except for Massachusetts, New York, and North Carolina. However, since 2016 with the enactment of the Defend Trade Secrets Act (DTSA), some additional trade secrets protection has become also available under federal law. One of the differences between patents and trademarks, on the one hand, and trade secrets, on the other, is that a trade secret is protected only when the owner has taken reasonable measures to protect the information as a secret (see 18 U.S.C. § 1839(3)(A)).

Nations have different trademark policies. Assuming the mark in question meets certain other standards of protectability, trademarks are generally protected from infringement on the grounds that other uses might confuse consumers as to the origin or nature of the goods once the mark has been associated with a particular supplier. Similar considerations apply to service marks and trade dress. By definition, a trademark enjoys no protection (qua trademark) until and unless it is "disclosed" to consumers, for only then are consumers able to associate it with a supplier or source in the requisite manner. (That a company plans to use a certain trademark might itself be protectable as a trade secret, however, until the mark is actually made public.) To acquire a trademark rights under U.S. law, one must simply use the mark "in commerce". It is possible to register a trademark in the United States, both at the federal and state levels. Registration of trademarks confers some advantages, including stronger protection in certain respects, but registration is not required in order to get protection. Registration may be required in order to file a lawsuit for trademark infringement.

To acquire a patent, enabling information about the method or product has to be supplied to a patent office and upon publication (usually, years before issuance of a patent), it becomes available to all. After expiration of the patent, competitors can copy the method or product legally. The most important advantage of patents (compared to trade secrets) is that patents assure the monopoly of their owners, even when the patented subject matter is independently invented by others later (there are some exceptions), as well as when the patented subject matter was invented by others prior to the patent's priority date, kept as a trade secret, and used by the other in its business. Although it is legally possible to "convert" a trade secret into a patent, the claims in such patent would be limited to things, that are easily discernable from examining such things. This means, that compositions of matter and articles of manufacture can not be patented after they become available to public, while processes can.

The temporary monopoly on the patented invention is regarded as a pay-off for disclosing the information to the public. In order to obtain a patent, the inventor must disclose the invention, so that others will be able to both make and use the invention. Often, an invention will be improved after filing of the patent application, and additional information will be learned. None of that additional information must be disclosed through the patent application process, and it may thus be kept as a trade secret. That nondisclosed information will often increase the commercial viability of the patent. Most patent licenses include clauses that require the inventor to disclose any trade secrets they have, and patent licensors must be careful to maintain their trade secrets while licensing a patent through such means as the use of a non-disclosure agreement. Compared to patents, the advantages of trade secrets are that a trade secret is not time limited (it "continues indefinitely as long as the secret is not revealed to the public", whereas a patent is only in force for a specified time, after which others may freely copy the invention), a trade secret does not imply any registration costs, has an immediate effect, does not require compliance with any formalities, and does not imply any disclosure of the invention to the public. The disadvantages of trade secrets include that "others may be able to legally discover the secret and be thereafter entitled to use it", "others may obtain patent protection for legally discovered secrets", and a trade secret is more difficult to enforce than a patent.

== Public safety ==
=== United States ===
The Freedom of Information Act of 1966 (FOIA), which requires federal agencies to provide documents to the public on request, includes a discretionary exemption for trade secrets. Thus, trade secret regulations can mask the composition of chemical agents in consumer products, which has long been criticized for allowing the trade secret holders to hide the presence of potentially harmful and toxic substances. It has been argued that the public is being denied a clear picture of such products' safety, whereas competitors are well positioned to analyze its chemical composition. In 2004, the National Environmental Trust tested 40 common consumer products; in more than half of them they found toxic substances not listed on the product label.

== Cases ==
- Data General Corp. v. Digital Computer Controls, Inc., 297 A.2d 433 (Del. Ch. 1971): protection and disclosure of design documents.
- Rivendell Forest Prods. v. Georgia-Pacific Corp., 28 F.3d 1042: trade secrets and software systems.
- IBM v. Papermaster (No. 08-9078, 2008 U.S. Dist): Mark Papermaster moving from IBM to Apple computer in 2008.
- Du Pont de Nemours and Company v. Kolon Industries Incorporated, Nos. 10-1103, 10-1275. U.S. Court of Appeals for the Fourth Circuit. Argued Oct. 26, 2010–March 11, 2011. trade secrets case involving Kevlar fiber, resulting in award to DuPont of ~US$920 million.
- Silvaco Data Systems v. Intel Corp. addressed the question of whether possession of software object code can result in misappropriation of trade secrets
- Christou v. Beatport, LLC determined that MySpace profiles could be held as trade secrets.

== See also ==
- Biswamohan Pani – Designer charged in 2008 with stealing $1 billion worth of trade secrets from Intel
- Data breach – Intentional or unintentional release of secure information
- Trade secrets in Canada
