= Video game monetization =

Process of generating revenue from a video game product

Video game monetization is a type of process that a video game publisher can use to generate revenue from a video game product. The methods of monetization may vary between games, especially when they come from different genres or platforms, but they all serve the same purpose to return money to the game developers, copyright owners, and other stakeholders. As the monetization methods continue to diversify, they also affect the game design in a way that sometimes leads to criticism.

== Methods ==
Although there are several business models to monetize video games, they can be categorized into six major models. A video game may use more than one of these models at once.

=== Retail ===
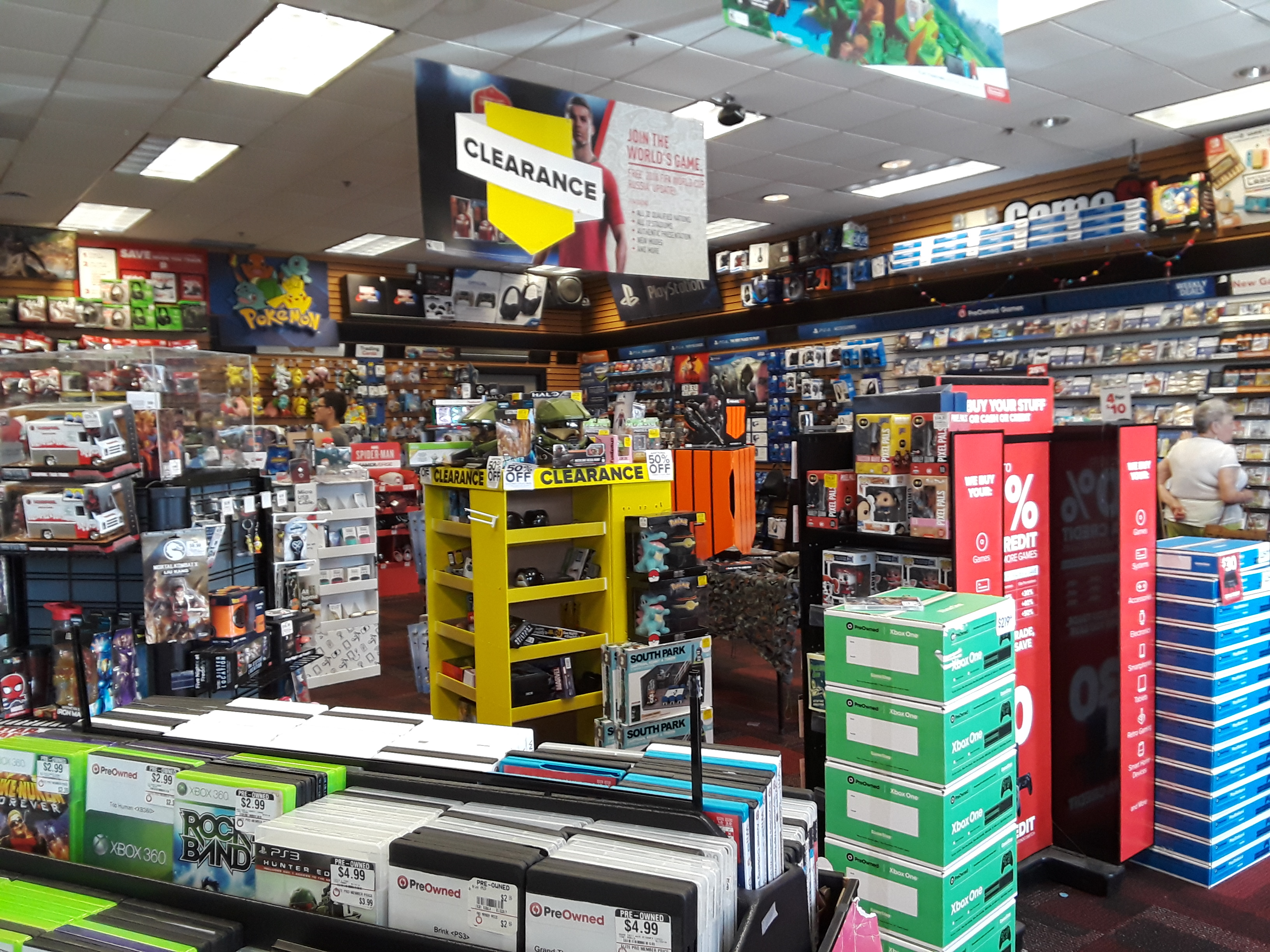
GameStop, a brick and mortar game retailer

Retail purchase is the traditional method by which games are sold from brick and mortar stores or online retailers. Customers pay for a physical copy of the game and any other game related peripheral devices required for play in-store. Retail purchasing has previously made up the bulk of game-related transactions, but it has been on the decline since the 2010s due to the rise of digital distribution and mobile gaming. However, the importance of brick and mortar game stores as a place for gamers to gather and show their passion still remains. Furthermore, some retail purchases may come with collectible boxes and possible in-game items to attract customers over digital download. The retail market also incorporates the second-hand market, the trading-in and resale of used games, such as through GameStop.

=== Digital distribution ===
Digital distribution or digital download is similar in practice to retail purchasing, but is different in venue. Instead of acquiring a game through a physical store, customers buy their games online and download the game's data directly to their devices. Many games sold through digital download are distributed by means of a third-party service that functions in the same way as a physical store, selling a variety of games from many different developers in one location. Valve's Steam is an example of digital distribution platforms for PC gaming.

=== Subscription ===
A subscription model is a business model where a game requires continuous, ongoing payments from customers in order to play the game. Games that utilize subscription often sell access in blocks of one-month increments or in multiples thereof. Once a subscription runs out or is canceled by a customer, their access to the game ceases or is reduced until they re-subscribe. This method is most often associated with games that require an online connection or services that require capital to operate on the part of the publisher or developer. An example of games that use subscription model is World of Warcraft.

Sony's subscription-based gaming service

Subscription service is, on the other hand, not a direct subscription to a game but a subscription to gaming-related services. These services may include, but not limited to, monthly games such as Humble Bundle, temporary access to game library such as Origin Access, and access to multiplayer online session such as PlayStation Plus.

=== Microtransaction ===
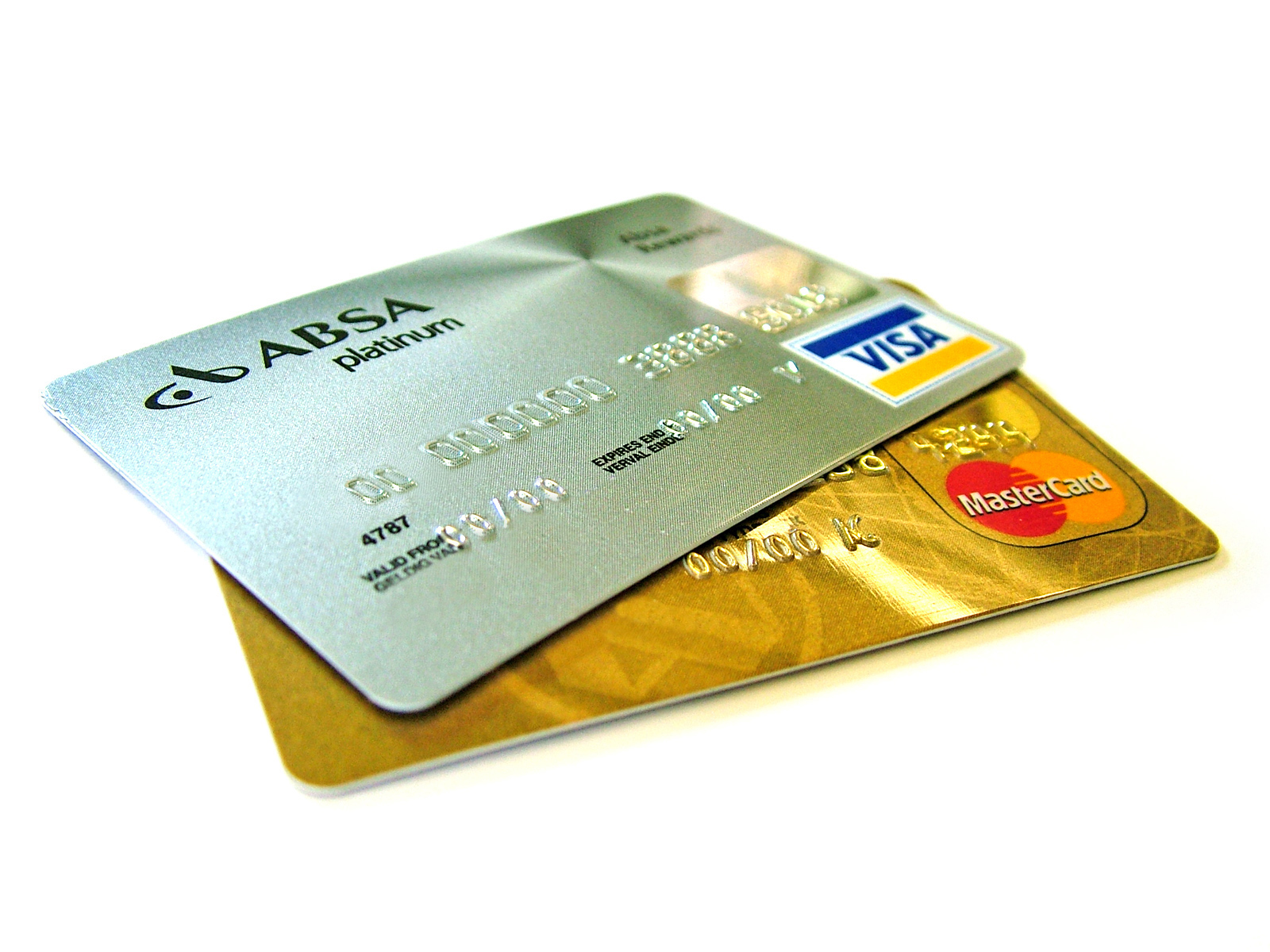
Credit cards are a popular payment method for digital distribution as well as microtransactions.

Microtransaction (MTX) is a business model where aspects of a game's contents can be purchased to enhance the game experience for the player. These aspects may range among new playable contents, in-game currencies, cosmetic options, and otherwise unavailable or restricted gameplay advantages. Traditionally, these purchases tend to be relatively inexpensive but numerous in variety. Microtransactions are often common in social and mobile games where potential customers may be hesitant to purchase a full game, but more at ease with smaller, yet more numerous payments.

Downloadable content (DLC) is a kind of microtransaction that expands the base game by providing additional contents. Depending on the game and publisher, a downloadable content may be a large expansion that greatly impacts the game, or a series of smaller expansions. These expansions can be either skins, maps, story, or even a new game mode based on the main game.

Premium currency is a type of virtual currency used by many free-to-play games to support microtransactions, such as V-bucks used for Fortnite or Robux for Roblox. While many games have a virtual currency that is gained while playing the game and can be used to buy items and equipment, premium currency generally is acquired by exchanging real-world money for a fixed quantity of virtual currency, when then is used to purchase in-game items. Developers can opt to reward premium currency for playing the game, such as the ability to recoup the cost of a Fortnite battle pass by completing it, and can discount in-game store items. Most often, premium currency cannot be redeemed for real-world money, with one notable exception being Second Life. Because of this limitation, premium currencies can be seen as predatory: these currencies are often only provided in packs of specific sizes, so that players cannot purchase the exact amount needed to acquire an in-game item, and thus some of the purchased premium currency will remain unspent.

Loot box is a variation of microtransaction of which the rewards are random. The player has no control over the rewards they receive for paying in-game or real world currencies although the game often shows a list of possible loots that the player may get from the loot box. The content of the loot box may range from purely cosmetic items with no effect on gameplay, such as skins in Overwatch, to powerful items with a gameplay advantage that otherwise the player has to grind to achieve. Some games may require the players to rely on loot box system to obtain characters and items more heavily than other games. They are sometimes referred to as a Gacha game.

Season passes allow players to buy multiple pieces of downloadable content for a game as a single purchase, usually at a discount compared to purchasing each piece of content individually. Season passes may be offered before all piece of DLC that would be included are announced, though consumers are usually told of the general type of content they will get and how many pieces of content they will get. Season passes may be offered on annual or more frequent schedules, and later releases of the game may include all season pass material as part of the package offered at a discounted. A related concept is the battle pass which provides access to a number of in-game cosmetics and other items for players as they either complete challenges for it or gain experience within the game.

=== Player trading ===
Player trading is a business model where in-game items and digital currencies can be traded between players on the game marketplace that allows the publisher to get a cut on transactions that players made. Most of the times, The publisher can get a percentage from every transactions, like Steam community market, or from a difference between buying and selling price of the in-game currency, like World of Warcraft. However, player trading can lead to a gray market where through third-party websites, these virtual items can be bought and sold with real-world currency, which, for games that use gambling-like mechanisms, can violate regional laws. In one specific case, Valve took steps to shut down extensive use of Counter-Strike: Global Offensive items that were being used for skin gambling after it was discovered that these items were being used to wager on games of chance by younger players.

Related to player trading is the incorporation of blockchain technology, which purports to provide an encrypted record of ownership and transfer for a digital item. This can be used to trade digital items by treating them as non-fungible tokens (NFTs). These blockchain transactions can also be set up to require that a percentage of the payments in a player-to-player transaction are diverted to the publisher. One of the first examples of a blockchain game was Cryptokitties in 2017, a virtual pet game where unique cartoon cats backed by blockchain (effectively NFTs) could be bred to make new ones that could be traded with others. Cryptokitties made headlines when one of these virtual cats sold for more than US$100,000 via Ethereum cryptocurrency. As of 2021, the use of blockchain and NFT for monetization is limited. Some publishers have expressed interest in increasing their use of blockchain and NFT technology. The intersection of video games and blockchain financing is sometimes referred to as "GameFi". Because players can earn money from these sales, such games can also be called "play-to-earn", with limited cases reported of players earning a living salary from participating in these games.

=== Advertising ===
Advertising is a form of indirect monetization. Apart from aforementioned methods of monetization, indirect monetization generate revenue from other sources that does not directly come from the player. Most frequently, this is the placement of advertisements within a game; these may take the form of banner advertisements, commercial breaks in play, or product placement in the game. Games that rely on advertisement for returns usually are free-to-play or are cheaper than other games as their production cost has already been subsidized. Undesirable advertising monetization is when the advertisements are designed to look like something the user might click without realizing it is an advertisement.

== Types ==
The above methods of monetization can be combined in multiple ways to produce various types of monetization schemes. As a result, games may be classified by the overall scheme used by consumers to pay for content in the game.

=== Upfront-based revenue models ===
These models are based on where the publisher and developer anticipates the bulk of the revenue to be acquired from upfront purchases of the game's title.

Premium
Premium games are those where the consumer buys the game once through retail or digital distribution, and may purchase additional downloadable content for the game, but the game itself has limited content. This typically describes the bulk of games sold at retail prior to the availability of digital distribution or online functionality, and remains a key sales area for console and computer games, but less common for mobile games.

Freeware
Games that are provided free of charge by their developer or publisher. These should not be confused with open-source games, which are games developed and released under open-source or free-software licenses, regardless of whether the user is charged for playing them. Freeware games, on the other hand, are provided free of charge, but might be released under a proprietary license.

Shareware
Games that typically follow the freemium model, offering a demo of the game and the ability to unlock the rest of the game with purchase of a code or similar unlocking mechanics. The intended use was for the game's files to be shared with other users, a means to distribute games prior to digital distribution.

=== Ongoing-based revenue model ===
In these ongoing revenue models, the publisher and developer may offer the game for free with the expectation that they will earn ongoing revenues from various transactions far along the lifetime of the game. This model is very common for many online games and in the mobile game marketplace.

Buy-to-play
Like premium games, the consumer buys the game once to play, but here, the game generally continues to be supported by the developer or publisher by maintaining online servers or producing new content regularly for the title. The player may need to buy access to this new content at times, such as through a season pass. Depending on the game, this type of model may ultimately be nearly indistinguishable from that of traditional premium games.

Free-to-play
Free-to-play games do not require the player to purchase the title to play, though access to some features and content may require purchase of a subscription or via microtransactions.

Freemium
Games that are free to play to start, but limit how far the player can progress before they must purchase the game.

Subscription model (Pay-to-play)
Games that require the player to pay a regular subscription fee to maintain access to all parts of a game. The game is typically free-to-play to allow new users to try the game but full access requires the subscription to be paid.

Advertising-based
Games which are typically free-to-play but require the player to periodically see advertising before they can continue, with the developer or publisher earning revenue from the advertising.

Play-to-earn or Pay-to-earn
Games that typically incorporate blockchain elements such as NFTs. Players are incentivized to use NFTs to improve their value or create new NFTs, with their sale managed by the video game publisher or developer. The player then is paid by the company for their work towards the new and/or upgraded NFT. There is usually an upfront payment required by the player to get started, typically in the purchase of either cryptocurrency used by the game or in-game currency that they can later trade out, thus making these games "pay-to-earn", and have been considered the equivalent of Ponzi schemes.

=== Ownership versus licensing ===
Games delivered on physical media which do not install content on a user's console or computer, such as most cartridge-based systems as well as earlier optical media games that simply read content directly from the disc, are generally considered to be products owned by the person that bought the game, and thus gives them the ability to give away or sell that game under principles like the first-sale doctrine of U.S. law; once the person has given away their copy, they generally have no legal means to play it.

As video game grew popular and the second-hand market for video games became popular, the industry began to introduce methods to limit second-hand sales of games that were delivered on installation media. Such methods included labelling games with "Not for Resale" stickers to simply discourage resale, and using product keys that could only be used once (through an online confirmation system), making the installation media valueless without a fresh product key. The industry has generally settled on using a software license that grants them the ability to install and play the game but restricts them from selling the game again. These licenses typically include end user license agreements (EULA) that limit what the user can do with the game, such as unlicensed modifications. License transfers may be possible under the EULA, but typically require the original owner to fully divest themselves of all copies of the game and related materials along with the installation media, and assure that the second-hand recipient agrees to the same EULA terms. Coupled with increased use of digital distribution, the license approach significantly limited the used game market.

Within the United States, the use of software licenses is considered upheld by case law under the Ninth Circuit decision of Vernor v. Autodesk, Inc., which ruled that consumers of software products with licenses are licensees and bound by the EULA and are not owners of the software, invalidating any first-sale rights. A subsequent Ninth Circuit case, MDY Industries, LLC v. Blizzard Entertainment, Inc., affirmed the Vernor decision to video games.

The situation is more complicated in Europe; in UFC Que Choisir v. Valve Corporation in 2015, a French court ruled against Valve for failing to offer the means for users to freely transfer game licenses between users, a requirement of European law.

In September 2024, California enacted AB 2426, effective January 1, 2025, which requires sellers of digital goods, including video games, to clearly disclose when consumers are acquiring a revocable license rather than unrestricted ownership, and restricts the use of terms such as "buy" or "purchase" without such disclosures. By 2026, the law had given rise to class action lawsuits against video game sellers over their digital storefront purchase flows.

== Impact ==
The video games industry has grown steadily; it was expected to generate $138 billion U.S. dollars in 2018, a 13.3% increase in revenue from the previous year, and the analytics firm Newzoo projected the global games market to reach $188.9 billion in 2025. In 2014, the digital download model made up 52% of all game sales and overtook retail purchase, the long-time industry standard. Since the mid-2010s, many video game publishers have adopted the games as a service model where a game continues to generate revenue after its release. As a result, a game tends to get extended support and more content post-launch so that it can be monetized via other methods in addition to retail and digital sales, allowing the consumers to make the most out of their purchase.

A 2025 industry report by Newzoo and Tebex reported substantial regional differences in annual player spending on game purchases, with paying players in North America spending considerably more than those in Europe.

However, since the method of monetization must be decided before the game production, it may affect the game's overall design and how players will interact with the game. Monetization trends like games as a service will shape how new games are designed, potentially making genre that are easy to monetize more popular than others. As a result, proper consideration of any strategy must be given during the design process. Improper consideration of balance between good game design and effective monetization can lead to either players feeling extorted by the game and its developers or a failure of the game to produce enough revenue for the game to turn a profit. In both scenarios, a game in question is likely to fail once on the market, the difference being whether it fails critically or financially.

In order to fund themselves, many independent game developers raise money by crowdfunding. They can also use crowdsourcing to break down the cost of development by distributing the workload to self-motivated individuals. Another way for independent developers to fund their games is to release an unfinished game as an early access where the players may purchase the game at a discounted price before it is complete.

Microtransactions have recently become a popular monetization model in massively multiplayer online (MMO) games. Previous to this development, the majority of MMOs relied on the subscription model, where users paid a monthly fee to the developer for continual access to the game. Some MMOs have had difficulty in turning a profit under this model however, thanks to too few subscriptions to cover operating costs. This has prompted several MMOs to experiment with alternative monetization strategies, ultimately leading to the adoption of microtransactions. While some MMOs continue to operate under the subscription model, many now have moved to microtransactions to ensure financial stability. With this shift, numerous virtual goods and services in MMOs that may have previously been available through normal play under the subscription model now can only be obtained through real currency transactions and it was expected that the microtransaction model would continue to be used under this model. However, overuse or improper application of microtransactions can make the player base feel forced to pay money and discourage them from playing, while the underuse may lead to too few microtransactions taking place to support the game and its developers.

Indirect monetization has undergone a recent surge in popularity as well. Through a combination of the propagation of both smartphones and Indie developers, the mobile games market has flourished. Although it had only 18% share of the video games industry in 2012, mobile games account for 51% of the video games market in 2018. Due to generally lower development, marketing, and maintenance costs as well a large target audience of players, mobile games are able to survive on a smaller income than most other varieties of games. The process is risky, however, since mobile games may often be hit or miss in their success. Games that pull in large numbers of players do well thanks to their advertisement model while those that fail to garner wide appeal do not last long on the market. Some have also criticized games implementing the indirect model as many games are made under it that are of low quality, or are non-user friendly with their monetization methods so as to maximize their income at the expense of player enjoyment.

== Criticism ==
Video game monetization has been criticized by journalists who see it as video game publishers being excessively greedy, in particular with the implementation of microtransactions. Games such as 2017's Star Wars Battlefront II have been criticized for gameplay elements that require extensive grinding which can otherwise be bypassed through loot boxes. The increasing adoption of loot boxes in gaming has led to some viewing the mechanic as a form of online gambling, with many countries revising their laws in response. Predatory monetization models are also criticized since they tend to target minors and may break child privacy laws.

Regulatory responses to these practices have grown since the late 2010s. In April 2018, the Belgian Gaming Commission concluded that paid loot boxes constituted illegal gambling under Belgian law, leading Electronic Arts to stop selling its FIFA Points currency in Belgium. In December 2022, Epic Games agreed to pay a total of $520 million to settle two complaints by the U.S. Federal Trade Commission over Fortnite: a $275 million penalty for violating the Children's Online Privacy Protection Act, the largest the agency had ever obtained for a rule violation, and $245 million in consumer refunds over the use of dark patterns that led players to make unintended purchases. In March 2025, the European Union's Consumer Protection Cooperation Network published a set of key principles on in-game virtual currencies, calling on game companies to display the price of in-game content in real-world money and to avoid practices that obscure costs, with particular attention to child players; industry bodies criticized the principles as introducing new interpretations of EU consumer law.

Boston College law professor Raul Carillo has described “gaming money", defined as "points earned in play, gift cards, and platform-stored balances", within games as unregulated monetary systems. These forms of money can be converted into currency and bank deposits. By avoiding regulatory requirements, gaming money could enable money laundering, rate manipulation, and other problems.

== History ==
=== Before the 1980s ===
The tradition of video game monetization can be traced back to the monetization of real life games, before the existence of the computer. A game is usually constructed with players, tools and rules. The tools for the game were made by skilled craftsman, usually with valuable materials, as described in the history. Thus, selling game tools for money became an understandable business long before the development of video games.

The history of video games leads back to the 70's and 80's, when arcade video games become popular worldwide. Following the precedents from the first arcade game to cost a quarter per play, Periscope, from the 60s, most arcade game machines are coin-operated. Players have to insert coins to play for certain time or certain lives. This can be classified as a type of microtransaction, and was highly successful during the golden years of arcade games. One of the most popular and influential arcade games, Taito's Space Invaders was reported to cause a shortage of 100-yen coins in Japan, 1978. By 1982, the game grossed $2 billion in quarters (equivalent to $7.26 billion in 2015), with a net profit of $450 million. When the Namco released Pac-Man in Japan on May 22, 1980, it became immensely popular from its original release to the present day. Later, it became one of the highest-grossing video games of all time, having generated more than $2.5 billion in quarters by the 1990s .

=== 1980s ===
With the development of computer technology, the home computer industry has been packed with competitors from 1980. The home computers started to prove their gaming capability not long after they were introduced to the public, since they are able to run multiple game programs, and release the full potential of the hardware. Compared with arcade machines, people are able to switch between games and play at their homes. Although early computers were weak in compatibility, the IBM PC compatible platform began to take over the fragmented market and ruled the PC game platform. On the other hand, the Third generation of video game consoles, represented by the NES console released in 1983, was able to help the North American game console market recover from the major crash during 1983 to 1985. From the 1980s, video games on the market were mostly sold in the way of retail purchase. Although the home computers were not specialized in gaming, gaming consoles were. Most games had to be sold in physical mediums, such as a ROM cartridge, a floppy disk or even a Compact Cassette. For the game console users, buying the hardware costs extra money, but they had more choices on games and suitable input/output device designed for gameplay.

=== 1990s ===
While old retail selling kept strong at 1990s, new way of game monetization emerged. The CD-ROM and other optical discs were taking the place of the cartridge, became the major medium of retail games. The development of web technology and bandwidth in the late 90s made many online games possible. The web based game Adventure Games Live revealed the possibility of the game running purely on a webpage, ever free of charge.

The handheld gaming devices were invented long before 1990s, but the Game Boy was a milestone on portable game history. The remarkable game innovation in this decade created a series of game consoles and devices. Handheld game devices with no changeable cartridges were also widely sold. In those cases, buying the hardware and software went together. An example can be the Tamagotchi sold by Bandai from 1996.

In the early 1990s, online gaming was only starting to emerge as consumer use of the Internet had yet to gain wide traction, and Internet service plans were typically based on time-limited charges. This effectively gated access to online games which were being offered in subscription model form. However, when America On-Line introduced flat-rate Internet access packages, that gate disappeared, allowing players to play online games indefinitely, which impacted revenue from these titles. One of the first examples of a massively-multiplayer online game (MMO) was Achaea, Dreams of Divine Lands, a text-based multi-user dungeon (MUD), released in 1997. Instead of launching with subscription fees to cover operating costs, its creator Matt Mihaly sought other ways to earn revenue, and after offering a few high-quality in-game items for real-world money at an auction, realized a way to make additional revenue. From that, Mihaly programmed into Achaea what is believed to be the first microtransaction, "dual currency" system, where two pools of in-game currency are available, those that are earned in-game, and those that are converted from real-world purchases into the premium currency, which was the only currency that could be used to purchase "virtual goods" in the game.

=== 2000s ===
In the first decade of the century, the game monetization was affected by the booming of the e-commerce, as well as hardware, software and other information technology developments. All kinds of online games and multiplayer games were connected through the faster Internet. The craze of MMORPG by made the subscription model a profitable way to support the game developers. Many browser games became free to play in order to attract more visits. At the early age of smartphones, mobile games were paid to download because there was usually no interface for a smartphone to install a physical copy. Standardization and the ubiquity of mobile platforms that allowed for easy purchases by customers, brought on initially by the iPhone App Store and followed closely by the Android Marketplace and other competitors, resulted in a wide spread move towards microtransactions and indirect monetization. After the social network became a big part of the Internet, more games started to take this platform as a way to sell or promote the game.

The 2000s also introduced the concepts of microtransactions and downloadable content (DLC). The late 1990s saw the emergence of the triple-A industry, video game developed by large studios with multi-million dollar budgets. These games typically were aimed at a core market of gamers with the latest consoles or high-end personal computers, and at the time, these games would only see most sales in the first few months after the game's initial release. DLC was seen as a means to extend the potential revenue from these games. In 2005, Microsoft envisioned the ability to buy digital add-ons for Xbox 360 games through the Xbox Live Marketplace, allowing players to purchases specific content they wanted at a low price ($1-$5) rather than having to buy a more expensive complete expansion. Though some content was offered before, this concept was cemented with the release of "horse armor" pack for Bethesda Softworks's The Elder Scrolls IV: Oblivion in 2006, and subsequently followed by many similar content packs over the next few years. While many player expressed outrage at the cost of what was decorative elements in-game, the horse armor pack was one of the top ten expansions that Bethesda sold for the game by 2009. Oblivion's microtransaction model was considered extremely successful, and was replicated in many other games that followed, with the "horse armor" establishing player acceptance of microtransactions in non-mobile games.

=== 2010s ===
In the second decade of the century, game monetization models using microtransactions and indirect monetization, moved rapidly towards becoming a mature market. Game production moved from focusing purely on monetization models after competition for player attention became more intense. As a result, the industry has widely moved from a direct focus on monetization metrics in game design to focus on metrics such as player retention and daily active users. This can be visibly seen in the decline in valuations of several prominent free-to-play companies, as well as by studying the differences in game design for top free-to-play to games.

This approach is considered "games as a service", as analysts have found that players put more value in games that provide a regular stream of new content than a title that does not receive updates. This model helps to assure a long revenue stream from the publisher as well as to allow them to publish fewer games and reduce development costs while still providing new content to players, with the potential to profit twice as fast from the traditional model. This approach also helps to insulate publishers from impacts of discounts and sales on digital game redemption keys from third-party sellers by requiring additional purchase of content as part of their services to gamers. Digital River estimated that the industry's value in 2017 had tripled from previous years due to the use of the "games as a service" model. Take-Two Interactive, in an investor call in November 2017, reported that 42% of their revenues were from "recurrent consumer spending" in their latest financial quarter, obtained through the Grand Theft Auto Online component of Grand Theft Auto V, and the "MyCareer" mode of NBA 2K18, both which offer players additional content and activities over time. Take-Two anticipates they will be using this model going forward for future games. Ubisoft, around the same time, reported that revenue from microtransactions and other in-game sales exceeded their revenue from direct digital sales of games during the first two quarters of their financial year for the first time.

The use of online passes emerged in 2010, primarily as a means to combat the used game market. While publishers could not prevent players from selling and buying used games such as through the retailer GameStop, they discovered that providing a one-time code within a new game that was needed to access online features, they were able to secure more revenue from selling these online passes to players that had bought the game used. Electronic Arts (EA) had developed the idea of "Project Ten Dollar", attaching content to a code packaged with the game for its upcoming titles for that year, Mass Effect 2, Dragon Age: Origins, and Battlefield: Bad Company 2. Successful in this area, EA transitioned this towards limiting a player from online play without either having purchased the game new or purchasing its online pass for a used copy, adding this into their popular EA Sports titles, starting with Tiger Woods PGA Tour 11. EA justified this as necessary to support their online servers for these titles. Ubisoft followed suit with "UPlay Passport" system, followed by several other publishers. However, due to changes in digital rights management for the upcoming eighth generation of video game consoles and player complaints, EA ended its online pass program by 2013, with other publishers following within the next few years.

Simultaneously, the use of season passes to assure access to a large number of downloadable content items that were to be doled out several months after the release of a game become popular. Season passes were priced to offer the items at a total discount than buying them separately, aiming to draw in players to purchase the passes who would unlikely desire to buy all the content separately. This can be seen as equivalent as pre-ordering the downloadable content, often without knowing exactly what that content might be. Publishers were able to gain another retail revenue by selling "deluxe editions" of games that included the season pass as well as other bonus features. The first such season passes arose from 2011 with Rockstar Games' L.A. Noire, offering additional cases and costumes, and Warner Bros.'s Mortal Kombat, providing access to all fighters to be added to the game. Activision followed a similar approach with its "Call of Duty Elite membership" for Call of Duty: Modern Warfare 3 that provided access to all of its maps planned for the following year.

Another monetization approach developed in the 2010s was the use of loot boxes. Loot boxes, which go by many different names, are earned by players as part of progressing in a game, can be purchased with in-game money or through real-world funds, or otherwise offered as promotional items; when opened (either freely or by purchase of a special "key"), they contain a fixed number of random in-game items, doled out based on a rarity system, and which may include both cosmetic items as well as gameplay-affecting equipment. Since loot boxes are designed as part of a compulsion loop in video game design, some players will be enticed to purchase more loot boxes with real-world funds, providing a further revenue stream to publishers. While loot boxes had been present in games prior to 2016, specifically from the Chinese game market and introduced to Western audiences through a 2010 update in Valve's Team Fortress 2, they were most visible as a result of the popularity and success of Blizzard's Overwatch in 2016. Loot boxes started becoming more common in full-price games, leading to several titles released in 2017 to be criticized for egregious implementations of loot boxes that were seen as anti-consumer, including Microsoft's Forza Motorsport 7, Warner Bros. Middle-earth: Shadow of War, and EA's Star Wars Battlefront 2. Because of their random nature, loot boxes are seen by some as a form of gambling, and several national governments have banned or regulated loot boxes under gambling legislation, or are looking to implement such legislation in wake of the loot box controversy arising from Star Wars Battlefront 2.

The fatigue over loot boxes led to a new monetization approach in the form of battle passes. Initially used by Valve's Dota 2, the battle pass concept was popularized by Fortnite Battle Royale in early 2018 and began to be used in other popular games. Battle passes provide a tiered approach to providing in-game customization options, all visible at the start as to avoid the randomization of the loot box approach, and requiring the player to complete various challenges and early in-game experience to unlock these tiers to gain the rewards; some games also provide means for players to use microtransactions to purchase tiers. Battle passes allow developers to roll in new content, encouraging players to purchase a new battle pass to obtain this content. Fortnite had proved a successful model, as while the game is free-to-play, microtransactions to purchase battle passes or to directly buy certain items have brought in hundreds of millions of dollars per month in revenue following their introduction.

=== Historical pricing of games ===
Raw data

Raw data
Average cost of top-end video games by year, with cartridge-based games shown in blue, and disc-based games in yellow.
Top: unadjusted for inflation. Bottom: adjusted to 2025 dollars.

The pricing of video games historically has not been set by any fixed price point though the markets will tend to average to a common price for a top-end game made by a first-party studio or a "triple-A" (AAA) developer, with games of lesser quality ("bargain-bin games"), or those made by smaller developers, such as indie games, sold under this point. Uncommonly, a game may ask for a higher price than the average but typically due to additional hardware or features sold. For example, Sega released Virtua Racing, originally an arcade game, for its Sega Genesis system by including the Virtua Processor used in the arcade machines within the cartridge itself, bringing the cartridge to a US$100 MSRP compared with the average US$60 for most Genesis games.

Pricing of games is based on numerous factors beyond development costs. It includes publisher payments including their marketing fees, manufacturing and printing costs, licensing fees for consoles, distribution, and retailer cuts, as well as accounting for possible returned inventory. An estimate from The Los Angeles Times of the costs behind a US$60 game in 2010 showed that only US$27 of that price, approximately 45%, was based on the publishers' costs which included development costs. Some of these costs remain unchanged over time, but technology improvements can see factors like manufacturing and distribution costs drop due to new media types and distribution, while more advanced game features will require greater development and publisher budgets.

Historically, the pricing of video games follows the trends of the industry. Initial cartridge-based games for the second generation in the early 1980s were around US$30−40. After the 1983 crash and the rapid technology advance of consoles over the third, fourth, and fifth generation, cartridge costs also rose due to added costs of ROM storage and coprocessors within cartridges, bringing prices up to US$70 around the late 1990s.

The fifth generation of consoles as well as personal computer games brought the introduction of optical media for game distribution, which was cheaper to produce. Initial games introduced on optical media were often priced comparable with cartridge games at around US$60−70 but after a few years, the price of these games settled to around US$50. Upon the introduction of the seventh generation of consoles in the mid-'00s, publishers started pushing at a US$60 price point for games, corresponding with ongoing economic growth at that time. The US$60 price remained a constant for fifteen years through the seventh- and eighth generations of consoles. However, these costs represent the initial purchase retail costs, and as described above, since around 2010, post-release monetization through DLC, season passes and other forms have become the common market practice with most AAA games to obtain additional review after the initial sale, in addition to collector's editions for initial sales.

There were industry indicators that another price bump was expected to occur up to US$70 with the introduction of the new generation of consoles, the PlayStation 5 and Xbox Series X and Series S in November 2020. This was primarily due to the more advanced technology that the new consoles offer that can run more impressive games but require greater developer resources to commit to supporting those features. The price bump had also been one that some in the industry believed should have happened sooner, but there had been strong resistance to move off the US$60 price point without good reason. The US$60 price point was a minimum resale price maintenance that distributors of the high-end games set for retailers as it gave distributors and retailers an assurance of how much take of each sale they got and could plan their businesses around that, and moving away from that model without other market forces at play would be risky.

Prior to September 2020, some individual games had been marked at the higher price tag, with Take-Two Interactive's NBA 2K21 being the first such game. Upon announcement of the pricing and release date of the PlayStation 5 in September 2020, Sony confirmed that it was adopting the US$70 price point for some of its first party games for the platform. Sony Interactive Entertainment president Jim Ryan said that this increase reflected the entertainment value of the game, stating "If you measure the hours of entertainment provided by a video game, such as Demon's Souls compared to any other form of entertainment, I think that's a very straightforward comparison to draw." Tim Stuart, the chief financial officer for Microsoft's Xbox division, also suggested that prices for their first-party games on the Xbox Series X/S will increase from US$60 after the console's launch. Ubisoft stated in September 2022 that its AAA games going forward will likely carry the $70 price. By the end of 2022, both Sony and Microsoft had committed to $70 games from their first-party studios, while Nintendo began offering select games at $70 in 2023, making the pricing decision on a case-by-case basis going forward.

Upon announcement of the Nintendo Switch 2 in April 2025, Nintendo said that its first-party games would cost between $70 and $80, an increase from original Switch games that typically cost $60. While these costs are consistent with the rate of inflation, Ars Technica writer Andrew Cunningham also suggested this reflected the increases costs related to the improved graphics on the Switch 2. However, these costs brought concerns from players that highly-anticipated games on other systems, such as Grand Theft Auto VI, may be pushed to higher prices, as much as $100, given the lead that Nintendo appeared to have given to go past the $70 game price. Microsoft announced its intention in May 2025 to increase price increases across its hardware and software lines, with new first-party games such as The Outer Worlds 2, to be sold for $80, The cost increased was criticized by consumers, and Microsoft reverted this approach in July 2025, opting to keep its games through the end of 2025 at the $70 price "in line with current market conditions".

Grand Theft Auto VI, to be released in November 2026, was priced at $80 for the base version, and only includes single-player game. While other games had had $80 price tags before, these typically were limited to physical copies of Nintendo Switch games, costing $10 more that digital copies to cover the cost of the game card.

== See also ==
- Data monetization
- Software monetization
- Website monetization
