= Software copyright =

Concept of copyright applied to computer code

Software copyright is the application of copyright in law to machine-readable software. While many of the legal principles and policy debates concerning software copyright have close parallels in other domains of copyright law, there are a number of distinctive issues that arise with software. This article primarily focuses on topics particular to software.

Software copyright is used by software developers and proprietary software companies to prevent the unauthorized copying of their software. Free and open source licenses also rely on copyright law to enforce their terms. For instance, copyleft licenses impose a duty on licensees to share their modifications to the work with the user or copy owner under some circumstances. No such duty would apply had the software in question been in the public domain.

== International laws ==
Computer programs are treated as literary works under international copyright treaties. Copyright protection is formality-free in countries party to the Berne Convention, which means that protection does not depend on compliance with any formalities such as registration or deposit of copies.

This inclusion of software in the wording of article 2 of Berne Convention is supported by the WIPO Copyright Treaty:

"Computer programs are protected as literary works within the meaning of Article 2 of the Berne Convention. Such protection applies to computer programs, whatever may be the mode or form of their expression."

— WIPO Copyright Treaty (WCT), Article 4.

A patent is generally granted after completing an examination procedure by a government agency. Copyright protection of computer software is established in most countries and harmonized by international treaties to that effect.

== National and supranational laws ==
=== Canada ===
In Canada, software is protected as a literary work under the Copyright Act of Canada. Copyright is acquired automatically when an original work is generated; the creator is not required to register or mark the work with the copyright symbol in order to be protected. The rights holder is granted: the exclusive right of reproduction, the right to rent the software, the right to restrain others from renting the software and the right to assign or license the copyright to others. Exceptions to these rights are set out by the terms of Fair Dealing; these exempt users from copyright liability covering usage and reproduction when performed for research, private study, education, parody or satire. Changes to the Copyright Act in regard to digital copyright were debated in the Canadian Parliament in 2008. Bill C-61 proposed alterations of the breadth and depth of exemptions for uses such as personal back-ups, reverse engineering and security testing.

=== China ===
Software copyright in China in Chinese Law means that a creator or other Obligee enjoys exclusive rights of the software under related copyright law.

It is a civil right and has the common features of all other civil rights. It is an exception in intellectual property rights because it is owned without individual confirmation. This is usually referred to as the principle of “automatic protection”. The owner enjoys the right of publication, authorship, consent to use as well as the right of being paid.

=== East Germany ===
A 1979 East German court ruling found that software was "neither a scientific work nor a creative achievement" and ineligible for copyright protection, legalizing software copying in the country.

=== India ===
Software can be copyrighted in India. Copyright in software, in the absence of any agreement to the contrary, vests in the author of the software, even for commissioned works. Copyright can be assigned or licensed through a written document, but under the Indian Copyright Act, in case the period of assignment is not specified, the period is deemed to be 5 years from the date of assignment (section 19(5) of the Copyright Act). In a recent judgement in the case of Pine Labs Private Limited v. Gemalto Terminals India Private Limited the Delhi High Court has laid down that the copyright belongs to the author (in this case, Pine Labs) and as the period of assignment was not specified in the document of assignment (the master service agreement), the copyright in the software reverted to Pine Labs after 5 years. See Assignment of Copyright in Software.

=== Pakistan ===
Under the provision of Copyright Ordinance 1962, works which fall into any of the following categories: literary, musical, or artistic are protected by Copyright law. The definition of literary work was amended by Copyright Amendment 1992 to include computer software. Section 2(p) of the ordinance defines a computer program as "that is to say programmes recorded on any disc, tape, perforated media or other information storage devices, which, if fed into or located in a computer or computer based equipment is capable of reproducing any information". In event of infringement, civil and/or criminal proceedings can be carried out. According to Chapter XIV of Copyright Ordinance, a person can face a prison of up to 3 years and/or a penalty of up to one hundred thousand rupees if he is found guilty of renting computer software without permission of the owner. According to a study of Business Software Alliance, 84% of software in Pakistan is being used in violation of the Copyright law of Pakistan.

=== United States ===
In the United States, computer programs are considered literary works, under the definition in the Copyright Act:

“Literary works” are works, other than audiovisual works, expressed in words, numbers, or other verbal or numerical symbols or indicia, regardless of the nature of the material objects, such as books, periodicals, manuscripts, phonorecords, film, tapes, disks, or cards, in which they are embodied.

— 17 U.S.C. § 101

The legal definition of "literary work" extends beyond the common-sense meaning of the term (literature such as For Whom the Bell Tolls) and includes any work expressed as a sequence of words, numbers, or symbols—in this case, the source or object code of computer programs.

Copyright attaches only to original works that are fixed in a tangible medium of expression. A work is “created” when it is fixed in a “tangible medium of expression” for the first time. 17 U.S.C. § 101. Circuits differ on what it means for a work to be fixed for the purposes of copyright law and infringement analysis. The graphics, sounds, and appearance of a computer program also may be protected as an audiovisual work; as a result, a program can infringe even if no code was copied. The set of operations available through the interface is not copyrightable in the United States under Lotus v. Borland, but it can be protected with a utility patent. The law is unclear as to whether transient copies – such as those cached when transmitting digital content, or temporary copies in a computer's RAM – are “fixed” for the purposes of copyright law. The Ninth Circuit has held that “A derivative work must be fixed to be protected under the Act, but not to infringe.” In Apple v. Microsoft, the courts established that a look and feel copyright claim must demonstrate that specific elements of a user interface infringe on another work. A program's particular combination of user interface elements is not copyrightable.

==== History ====
Historically, computer programs were not effectively protected by copyrights because computer programs were not viewed as a fixed, tangible object: object code was viewed as a utilitarian good produced from source code rather than as a creative work. Due to lack of precedent, this outcome was reached while deciding how to handle copyright of computer programs. The United States Copyright Office attempted to classify computer programs by drawing an analogy: the blueprints of a bridge and the resulting bridge compared to the source code of a program and the resulting executable object code. This analogy caused the Copyright Office to issue copyright certificates under its rule of doubt.

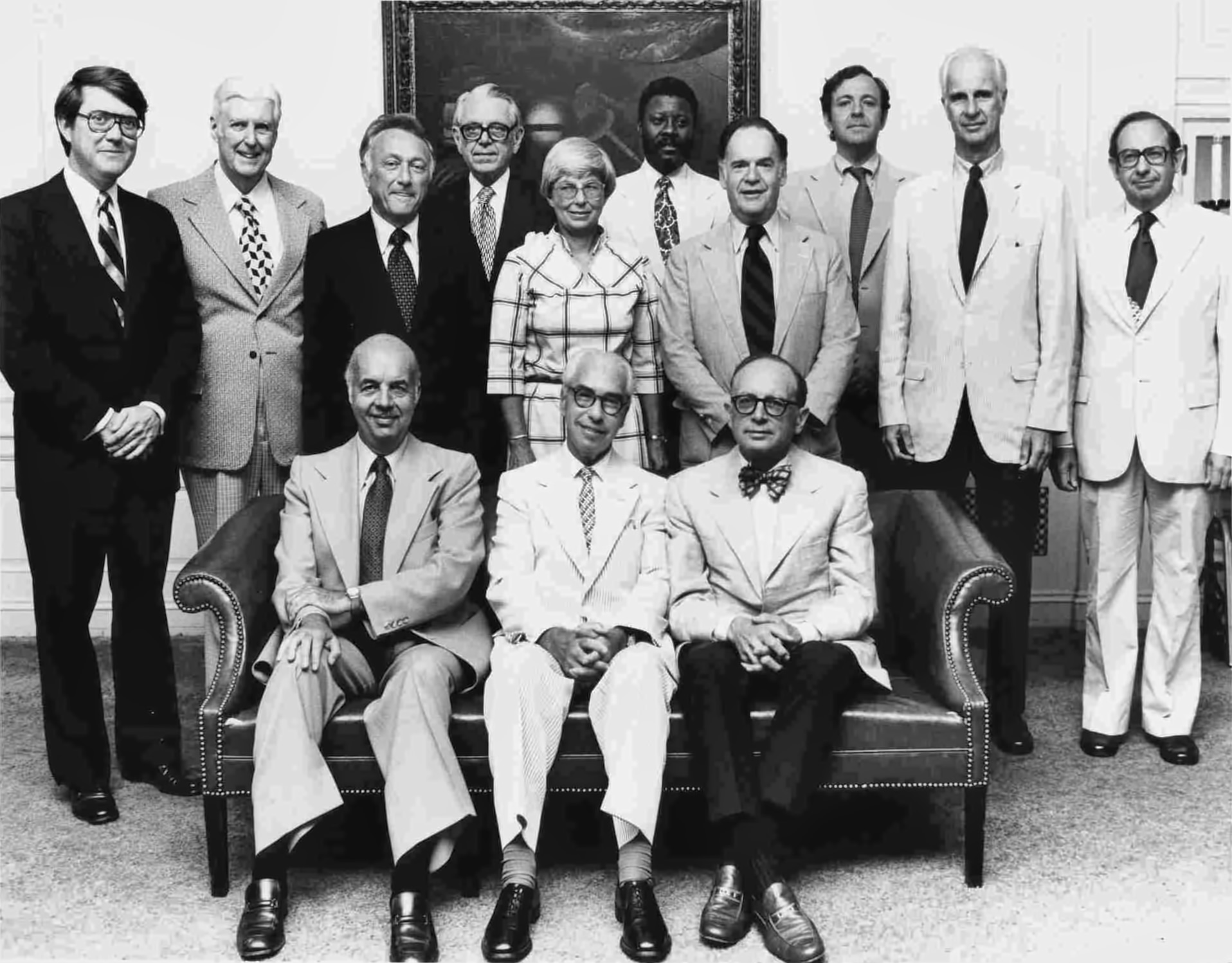
The CONTU commissioners and staff in 1978

In 1974, the Commission on New Technological Uses of Copyrighted Works (CONTU) was established. CONTU decided that "computer programs, to the extent that they embody an author's original creation, are proper subject matter of copyright." In 1980, the United States Congress added the definition of "computer program" to 17 U.S.C. § 101 and amended 17 U.S.C. § 117 to allow the owner of the program to make another copy or adaptation for use on a computer.

This legislation, plus court decisions such as Apple v. Franklin in 1983 clarified that the Copyright Act gave computer programs the copyright status of literary works. Many companies began to claim that they "licensed" but did not sell their products, in order to avoid the transfer of rights to the end-user via the doctrine of first sale (see Step-Saver Data Systems, Inc. v. Wyse Technology). These software license agreements are often labeled as end-user license agreements (EULAs). Another impact of the decision was the rise of the shrink-wrap closed source business model, where before a source code driven software distribution schema dominated.

Still elusive was the exact boundary between the copyrightable expression and the unprotectable elements—ideas, procedures, processes, etc.—in computer programs. In Whelan Associates v. Jaslow Dental Laboratory (1986), the Third Circuit held that a program's structure, sequence and organization (SSO) was part of its copyrighted expression, since the general idea of a computer program's purpose "could be accomplished in a number of different ways with a number of different structures." However, this decision has been criticized for "conceiving of programs as having only one abstract idea each," even though "more complex, detailed, and functional information innovations" such as procedures, processes, and systems are also excluded from copyright protection under 17 U.S.C. § 102(b).

In 1998, the United States Congress passed the Digital Millennium Copyright Act (DMCA) which criminalizes evasion of copy protection (with certain exceptions), destruction or mismanagement of copyright management information, but includes a clause to exempt ISPs from liability of infringement if one of their subscribers infringes. In addition, the DMCA extends protection to those who copy a program for maintenance, repair or backup as long as these copies are "destroyed in the event that continued possession of the computer program should cease to be rightful."17 U.S.C. § 117

==== Copyrightable elements in software ====
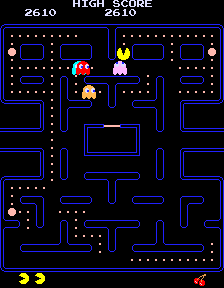
Video game displays—like that of Pac-Man, depicted here—are often copyrighted as audiovisual works separately from the underlying code.

The dividing line between copyrightable expression and the uncopyrightable ideas, methods, and algorithms that make up a computer program has been debated by copyright scholars. Charles Duan emphasizes the non-functional, communicative elements of a program's source code, such as comments, whitespace, syntactic sugar, and the ordering of variable and subroutine declarations.

As with other works, copyright for computer programs prohibits not only literal copying, but also copying of "nonliteral elements" such as program's structure, sequence and organization. These non-literal aspects, however, can be protected only "to the extent that they incorporate authorship in programmer's expression of original ideas, as distinguished from the ideas themselves." In Computer Associates v. Altai (1992), the Second Circuit proposed the abstraction–filtration–comparison test for identifying these protected elements. This test attempts to distinguish copyrightable aspects of a program from the purely utilitarian and the public domain.

In addition to the code, a program's graphical output may be copyrightable as a visual or audiovisual work, with protection extending to the original selection and arrangement of visual elements. This is often the case for video games and mobile apps.

The use of generative AI tools in software development complicates the copyright status of computer programs. Code solely generated by a large language model is not copyrightable under U.S. law because it does not have a human author. However, where a programmer directs an AI assistant or modifies AI-generated outputs, the human-made portions of the code may be copyrighted. The position of the U.S. Copyright Office is that works produced through prompting alone do not exhibit the traditional elements of authorship and cannot be copyrighted. However, Edward Lee proposes that programmers can still claim copyright in vibe coded programs even if they do not write any lines of code, but this copyright only extends to their selection and arrangement of AI-generated outputs.

==== EULAs and rights of end users ====
The Copyright Act expressly permits copies of a work to be made in some circumstances, even without the authorization of the copyright holder. In particular, "owners of copies" may make additional copies for archival purposes, "as an essential step in the utilization of the computer program", or for maintenance purposes. Furthermore, "owners of copies" have the right to resell their copies, under the first sale doctrine and 17 U.S.C. § 109.

These rights only apply to "owners of copies." Most software vendors claim that their products are "licensed, not sold", thus sidestepping 17 U.S.C. § 117. American courts have taken varying approaches when confronted with these software license agreements. In MAI Systems Corp. v. Peak Computer, Inc., Triad Systems Corp. v. Southeastern Express Co., and Microsoft v Harmony, various Federal courts held that "licensed, not sold" language in an EULA was effective. Other courts have held that "no bright-line rule distinguishes mere licenses from sales...The label placed on a transaction is not determinative". The Ninth Circuit took a similar view (in the specialized context of bankruptcy) in Microsoft Corp. v. DAK Industries, Inc.

By contrast, in the European Union the European Court of Justice held that a copyright holder cannot oppose the resale of a digitally sold software, in accordance with the rule of copyright exhaustion on first sale as ownership is transferred, and questions therefore the "licensed, not sold" EULAs in the EU.

==== Fair use ====
Fair use is a defense to an allegation of copyright infringement under section 107 of the Copyright Act of 1976. This section describes some of the uses of copyrighted software that courts have held to be fair.

In Galoob v. Nintendo, the 9th Circuit held that modification of copyrighted software for personal use was fair. In Sega v. Accolade, the 9th Circuit held that making copies in the course of reverse engineering is a fair use, when it is the only way to get access to the "ideas and functional elements" in the copyrighted code, and when "there is a legitimate reason for seeking such access".

The Supreme Court ruled in Google LLC v. Oracle America, Inc. (2021) that the reuse of application programming interfaces (APIs) including representative source code can be transformative and fall within fair use, though did not rule if such APIs are copyrightable.

== Copyleft ==
A copyleft is a type of copyright license that allows redistributing the work (with or without changes) on condition that recipients are also granted these rights.

== See also ==
- End-user license agreement
- Free-software license
- Software patent
- Intellectual property protection of typefaces
- Intellectual property protection of video games
