= Software law =

Body of law that governs software

Software law refers to the legal remedies available to protect software-based assets. Software may, under various circumstances and in various countries, be restricted by patent or copyright or both. Most commercial software is sold under some kind of software license agreement.

== See also ==
- Legal aspects of computing
- Software copyright
- Software patent
- Software license
- Software license agreement
- Proprietary software
- Free and open source software
