= Microsoft Corp. v. DAK Industries, Inc. =

Microsoft Corp. v. DAK Indus., Inc.
- Court: United States Court of Appeals for the Ninth Circuit
- Full case name: Microsoft Corporation v. Dak Industries Incorporated
- Decided: October 2, 1995
- Citation: 66 F.3d 1091

Case history
- Prior action: 27 Bankr.Ct.Dec. 118 (Denied Microsoft's administrative expense claim)

Court membership
- Judges sitting: William A. Fletcher, Melvin T. Brunetti, and Thomas G. Nelson

Case opinions
- Buying a lump sum of software was found to be equivalent to buying a lump sum of physical goods when considering the 'economic realities' of the deal, even if it was sold under a license providing a 'permission-to-use' the intellectual property.

Microsoft Corp. v. DAK Indus., Inc. 66 F.3d 1091 (9th Cir 1995) is a court case in which Microsoft contended that in being licensed rights to sell Microsoft Word (Word) software, the then-bankrupt DAK Industries had been granted permission to use this intellectual property, so Microsoft was entitled to receive payments during post-bankruptcy in the form of royalties.

The Ninth Circuit disagreed, believing that the 'economic realities' of the agreement in which payments for a certain number of copies of Word were made in the form of installments meant that the agreement should be considered as a 'lump sum sale of software units' even if the agreement was called a license that required 'royalties' instead of 'payments'. Microsoft was therefore unable to claim special interest over the bankruptcy claim as it was a transfer of goods in the form of a sale, making it an unsecured creditor.

== Background ==
DAK Industries, a supplier of computer hardware, entered into a license agreement with Microsoft, a software distributor, that granted DAK the rights to distribute and license copies of Microsoft Word on the computers it sold during the term of the agreement. Microsoft provided DAK a master disk, which was used to install Microsoft Word onto the computers DAK distributed. Payment for this license agreement was in the form of a 'royalty rate' of $55 for each copy of Word that was distributed. However, DAK had to make a minimum commitment to Microsoft of $2.75 million to be paid in 5 installments over a one-year period, irrespective of the number of copies DAK managed to sell. DAK was therefore entitled to distribute up to 50,000 units, with any additional units then attracting the $55 charge.

DAK delivered the first three installments to Microsoft. However, they filed for bankruptcy before completing the remaining payments. After bankruptcy, DAK continued to sell copies of Word without making the remaining installment payments.

Microsoft alleged that it was entitled to 'administrative expenses' from DAK to compensate it for the continued use of the license agreement that allowed distribution of its software.

=== District Court and Bankruptcy Court opinion ===
The bankruptcy court denied Microsoft's claim on the basis that even though Microsoft had labelled the agreement as royalty payments for the continued use of its intellectual property, it was more like installment payments on the sale of goods. This made the debt owed to Microsoft an unsecured claim. On appeal to the district court, the district court affirmed the bankruptcy court's decision, stating that Microsoft was not facing any continued expenses in DAK's distribution of Word. Microsoft then appealed to the United States Court of Appeals for the Ninth Circuit.

== Opinion of the Ninth Circuit ==
The Ninth Circuit provided several reasons for its belief that the 'economic realities' of the agreement between Microsoft and DAK was about a 'lump sum sale of software' rather than the permission to use the Word intellectual property:

- The pricing structure in which DAK was required to make a minimum commitment was based on the number of units DAK received from Microsoft rather than a duration of time that DAK could use the Microsoft Word software, as would be expected in a rental agreement
- The agreement demanded that DAK pay the entire $2.75 million even if it only ever sold one copy, and DAK at the time of the agreement was entitled to sell the entire amount agreed to. The court considered this to be similar to the purchase of goods on unsecured credit where DAK made a down payment, obtained the goods, and would pay the remainder in installments. DAK did not have to pay at the time it actually sold the goods, like one would expect in a rental agreement
- The license agreement effectively gave DAK a 'right to sell' rather than 'permission to use' the Word intellectual property: it sold Word directly to customers rather than using it as part of its business
- DAK's post-bankruptcy use of Word was at no expense to Microsoft—DAK was already allowed to sell 50,000 copies of Word

The court found that simply naming the agreement as a license and denoting the payments as royalties did not in fact make it a license in terms of intellectual property. Also the court found that DAK's sales indicate it did not sell all of the units it was entitled to under the agreement. Moreover, the court noted that Microsoft did not have a business relationship with DAK after bankruptcy, therefore granting Microsoft's claim would be unjust to other unsecured creditors. Consequently, the court affirmed the decisions of the bankruptcy and district courts and denied Microsoft's claim.

== Subsequent developments ==
=== Other cases ===
The idea of courts looking at the 'economic realities' of a deal to decide if a transaction is a sale or a 'license to use' was also adopted in SoftMan Products Co. v. Adobe Systems Inc. When a consumer purchased Adobe software, they received a single copy for which they paid in entirety and the license is valid forever. Adobe argued that consumers were merely given a licence to use the software rather than being sold the software itself. However the court found that, like in DAK, the nature of the transaction indicated the sale of goods and hence the first sale doctrine would apply. In Universal Music Group v. Augusto, the court also looked at the 'economic realities' of the transaction involving UMG distributing promotional music CDs to 'music industry insiders' and found that since UMG provided the CDs with no intention of recovering them, it was a transfer of title, although UMG labeled ('licensed') the CDs with certain constraints on their usage such as limiting resale. Because these constraints are not valid, the defendant was able to sell the promotional CDs under the first sale doctrine.

=== Criticism ===
Some have disagreed with the court's founding its opinion on seeing a software license as merely a sale of goods. They argued that DAK was provided with a non-exclusive license to distribute Word—they were only entitled under the license to use the master disk in order to provide additional copies of Word as per a royalty scheme. DAK only created the copies of Word it needed for the duration that it was allowed to use Microsoft's Word master disk. Any payment made by DAK were merely an advancement against potential royalties: a common agreement in book and motion picture licenses. Therefore, contradicting the court's opinion, the way in which DAK was able to sell copies of Word should be seen as a permission to use the intellectual property (use of the master disk) rather than a 'sale of goods' in the way a manufacturer sells a given quantity of goods to a reseller and hence Microsoft should receive royalty payments as per the initial agreement.

== See also ==
- Microsoft litigation
- Software license
- Vernor v. Autodesk, Inc.
