= Microsoft Corp. v. Harmony Computers & Electronics, Inc. =

Eastern New York Court Case

Microsoft Corp. v. Harmony Comps. & Elecs., Inc.
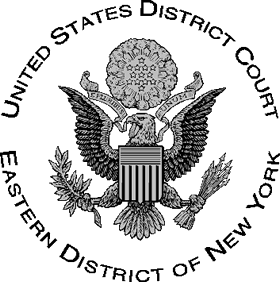
- Court: United States District Court for the Eastern District of New York
- Full case name: Microsoft Corp. v. Harmony Computers & Electronics, Inc.
- Decided: Feb. 7, 1994
- Citations: 846 F. Supp. 208; 31 U.S.P.Q.2d 1135; Copy. L. Rep. (CCH) ¶ 27,257

Holding
- Defendant's selling of copyrighted Microsoft products, without license or authorization, constituted copyright infringement, was not protected by the first-sale doctrine, and its distribution of the plaintiff's products in a stand-alone fashion violated the Microsoft License Agreement.

Court membership
- Judge sitting: Raymond J. Dearie

Keywords
- Copyright, First-sale doctrine, Software license

Microsoft Corp. v. Harmony Comps. & Elecs., Inc., 846 F. Supp. 208 (E.D.N.Y. 1994), was an Eastern New York District Court decision regarding copyright infringement and breach of license agreement. Microsoft Corp. (referred to as "Microsoft" below) filed the lawsuit against Harmony Comps. & Elecs., Inc. (referred to as "Harmony" below) and its president, Stanley Furst (together referred to as the "defendants" below), seeking declaratory and injunctive relief and treble damages. The defendants did not contest the plaintiff's claim that Harmony sold Microsoft's products without any Licenses or authorization, or that they sold Microsoft's products stand-alone, which violated Microsoft's license agreement. Instead, the defendants argued that their action was protected by the first-sale doctrine 17 U.S.C §109(a) (1977). After reviewing the facts, the court found that the defendants' action constituted copyright infringement, and that the first-sale doctrine did not apply since the defendants failed to prove that the Microsoft products they sold were lawfully acquired. The court also ruled that the defendants breached Microsoft's software license agreement by selling the products stand-alone.

== Background ==
The defendants sold Microsoft's copyrighted products, including Microsoft MS-DOS and Microsoft Windows software programs, without License or authorization. Furthermore, they sold such products either stand-alone or loaded on computer hard disks. They continued their activity despite Microsoft's notification letters of illegality on April 19, June 16, July 14, and September 14, 1993. According to Robert Wanezek, Program Manager of Microsoft's Replication Group, and Lee Gates, Microsoft's Software Design Test Engineer, twenty-one pieces of counterfeit products were found on defendants' premises. Microsoft hired private investigators, who were then able to purchase various Microsoft products from the defendants. Other customers who bought Microsoft's products from the defendants called Microsoft's Piracy Hotline to question the legitimacy of Harmony's sales.

The defendants denied that any of their products sold were counterfeit. They argued that even if any of the Microsoft products were counterfeit, they purchased them in the good faith that such products were genuine. Furthermore, they argued that their selling of Microsoft products was protected by the first-sale doctrine and thus the copyright infringement claim did not hold.

== Holding ==
Without an evidentiary hearing, the court ruled that the copyright infringement was likely to hold in this case based on the facts that the defendants were never licensees of Microsoft's and therefore were unauthorized to distribute any of Microsoft's products. The court found it unnecessary to verify the genuineness of the Microsoft products sold by Harmony. Furthermore, the court cited ISC-Bunker Ramo Corp. v. Altech, Inc., 765 F. Supp. 1310, 1331 (N.D.Ill. 1990) ("there is no such thing as a bona fide purchase for value in copyright law") and ruled that Harmony's good faith argument did not hold. The fact that the defendants ignored Microsoft's four notification letters proved that they were not "innocent infringers".

The first-sale doctrine did not apply to this case, since the defendants failed to trace the "chain of title" and establish a proof of first sale. The court reasoned that "in civil actions for copyright infringement, the defendant has the burden of proving that the particular pieces of the copyrighted work that he sold were lawfully made or acquired" and that "the fact that defendants bought their Microsoft Products from another party does not by itself establish a first sale".

As to the fact that Microsoft's "undercover investigator" traced some of the products sold by Harmony to two of Microsoft's licensees, the defendants still violated Microsoft's License agreement, which required that licensees "shall distribute Product(s) only with [licensee's] Customer System(s)". (The "Customer System" here means a "single user computer system".) Harmony's selling the product stand-alone breached Microsoft's License agreement.

== See also ==
- List of leading legal cases in copyright law
- First-sale doctrine
- Copyright infringement of software
- Bobbs-Merrill Co. v. Straus
