= Xiao-i =

Chinese cognitive artificial intelligence enterprise

- Native name: 小i机器人
- Type: Public
- Traded as: Nasdaq: AIXI
- Industry: Artificial Intelligence
- Founded: 2001; 25 years ago
- Headquarters: Shanghai, China
- Key people: Max Yuan Hui (Chairman of the Board & CEO)
- Services: Natural Language Processing, Deep Semantic Interaction, Voice Recognition, Image Recognition, Machine Learning, Big Data
- Revenue: ▲US$59.2 million (2023)
- Number of employees: 600+
- Website: www.xiaoi.com/en/

Xiao-i (or Xiao-I Corporation; Chinese: 小i机器人) is a Chinese cognitive artificial intelligence enterprise founded in 2001.

On June 29, 2023, Xiao-i launched its generative model Hua Zang Universal Large Language Model. In the same year on October 26, Xiao-i launched the Hua Zang Ecosystem and showcased co-creation achievements with eight ecosystem partners, including Orient Securities, Henkel China, Nexify, Ubebis, Deltapath Technology, and eRoad. The co-creations cover the Internet of Things (IoT), finance, maternal and infant, automobile, manufacturing, carrier, intelligent services, and human resources.

Xiao-i has developed a standard in affective computing (ISO/IEC JTC1/SC35 WD30150) and has contributed to the drafting of the "China AI Industry Intellectual Property (IP) Rights White Paper" for four consecutive years.

In 2018, Xiao-i established its APAC headquarters in Hong Kong. On March 9, 2023, Xiao-i went public on the Nasdaq stock exchange and established its US branch in June of the same year. Xiao-i has set up its offices in the Middle East as well.

== History ==
Xiao-i (Shanghai Xiao-i Robot Technology Co., Ltd) was founded in Shanghai, China, in 2001. In 2004, it released the world's first chatbot on MSN and Tencent QQ. In the same year, the company applied for an invention patent for this technology, and it was officially granted authorization in 2009, titled "A Chat Robot System."

In 2004, Xiao-i launched Xiao-i Chat Robots, which later obtained over 100 million users, on MSN and Tencent QQ. In 2007, Xiao-i was designated as the only partner for Microsoft MSN's 700 million users worldwide in robots and expanded its reach through collaborations with MSN and QQ. In 2008, Xiao-i released intelligent customer service system for China Mobile.

In 2012, Xiao-i launched WeChat based intelligent customer service products for banking industry, serving clients including China Merchants Bank. In 2015, Xiao-i launched cloud-based open system iBot Cloud and iBot OS, which integrates the capabilities of local cloud computing with interactive features to create a fully connected household. Xiao-i later established its APAC headquarter in Hong Kong and started expanding its businesses into Southeast Asia.

In June 2022, Xiao-i developed a standard in affective computing, published by the International Organization for Standardization (ISO). On March 9, 2023, Xiao-i went public on the Nasdaq stock exchange. On October 26 of the same year, Xiao-i announced the launch of its Hua Zang Universal Large Language Model Ecosystem.

== Publication and Patents ==
Xiao-i has developed the first international standard in affective computing (ISO/IEC JTC1/SC35 WD30150). The standard defines a universal model for affective computing and outlines the definitions and application methods of affective computing user interface standards in specific contexts. The standard was published by the International Organization for Standardization (ISO) in June 2022.

As of early January 2024, Xiao-i has been granted 323 authorized patents, 137 registered software copyrights, and 248 authorized trademarks.

== Overseas Presence ==
Xiao-i has offices located in Delaware, Abu Dhabi, and Hong Kong.

In 2018, Xiao-i established its APAC headquarters in Hong Kong.

In June 2023, Xiao-i established its subsidiary, Xiao-I Plus Inc., in Delaware and held a launch ceremony at the University of Maryland.

== Products and Services ==
- Xiao-i has launched the Hua Zang Universal Large Language Model, and building on its foundation, Xiao-i has also launched the Hua Zang Ecosystem.
- Xiao-i's industry-specific solutions include "Hua Zang+Customer Service Center," "Hua Zang+Finance," "Hua Zang+Urban Public Service," "Hua Zang+Enterprise," "Hua Zang+Architecture," "Hua Zang+Healthcare," "Hua Zang+Manufacturing," and "Hua Zang+Metaverse."
- Xiao-i's core application products include AI Chatbot, Live Chat, Smart Agent Assistant, Smart Coach, Smart IVR, Smart Outbound Call, RPA, Smart Drawing Review, Intelligent Cloth Inspection System, and Ruilan-LLM Research Assistant.
- Xiao-i is an IoT solutions provider with terminal equipment for the household, home appliances, wearables, vehicles, access control, and toys built with intelligent operating system iBot OS.
- Xiao-i and Ubebis, a maternal and infant health tech company, have collaborative developed a smart baby crib, which targets the UAE market, based on the Hua Zang Universal Large Language Model.
- Xiao-i has developed a virtual try-on network architecture named TOTD (Try on Today, formerly known as OOTDiffusion) and has released the algorithm on GitHub.

== Patent Case ==
In 2004, Xiao-i filed an application for an invention patent titled "A Chatbot System." The patent was officially granted authorization in 2009, numbered ZL200410053749.9.

In June 2012, Xiao-i contended that Apple Inc.'s integration of Siri in its iPhone 4S has infringed on its patented technology, falling within the scope of protection of its patent. Xiao-i then initiated a patent infringement lawsuit against Apple at the First Intermediate People’s Court of Shanghai. In November 2012, Apple filed an administrative review petition with the National Intellectual Property Administration (CNIPA), requesting the invalidation of the patent. By September 2013, the Patent Reexamination Board of CNIPA decided to uphold the validity of the patent. Following the decision, in November of the same year, Apple brought an administrative lawsuit against the Patent Reexamination Board of CNIPA at the First Intermediate People's Court of Beijing, the court ruled in July 2014 to uphold the decision made by the Patent Reexamination Board maintaining the validity of the patent. Dissatisfied with the ruling, Apple appealed to the Beijing High People's Court.

In April 2015, the Beijing High People's Court declared the patent invalid. In May of the same year, Xiao-i appealed to the Supreme People's Court of the People's Republic of China. In 2016, following the decision of the Beijing High People’s Court on the patent invalidity, the First Intermediate People’s Court of Shanghai dismissed Xiao-i's lawsuit filed back in 2012.

On June 28, 2020, the Supreme People's Court of the People's Republic of China rendered a verdict affirming the validity of Xiao-i's patent. This marked the conclusion of an eight-year-long judicial proceedings initiated by Apple’s request to invalidate Xiao-i's patent. The final outcomes affirmed and protected the patent in question.

In August 2020, Xiao-i again filed a lawsuit against Apple at the Shanghai High People's Court, alleging that Apple's Siri infringed its patent rights and sought RMB 10 billion (US$1.4 billion) compensation from Apple. The case is currently under review, and information is subject to public disclosure.
