= Software copyright in China =

Software copyright in China in Chinese Law means that a creator or other Obligee enjoys exclusive rights of the software under related copyright law.

It is a civil right and has the common features of all other civil rights. It is an exception in intellectual property rights because it is owned without individual confirmation. This is usually referred to as the principle of “automatic protection”. The owner enjoys the right of publication, authorship, consent to use as well as the right of being paid.

== Rights ==
- Right of publication: i.e. right to decide to release the software or not;
- Right of authorship: i.e. right to the creator's open identity, and their right to sign in to the software;
- Right of revision: i.e. right to supplement, delete, or change instructions;
- Right of reproduction: i.e. right to reproduce the software;
- Right of distribution: i.e. right to release original or duplicate software to the public through selling or donating;
- Right of lease: i.e. right to permit temporary paid use of the software to third parties;
- Right of information network transmission: i.e. right to provide owned software to the public through wired or wireless means to allow said public to access the software in whichever time or place;
- Right of translation: i.e. right to translate software from one language to another:
- Other rights: i.e. other minor rights enjoyed by the software copyright owner.

== Significance of registration ==
1. Served as a significant basis of tax reduction and exemption: According to the relative regulations of Ministry of Finance and State Administration of Taxation, “business tax rather than value-added tax will be collected on the computer software that has been registered by the national copyright bureau when it is sold and copyrighted and ownership is transferred.”

2. Served as a basis to provide protection of the law: According to the related decree of the Council, “copyright administrative department should standardize and strengthen system on software copyright registration, encourage software copyright registration, and provide special protection in law to the registered software”. For instance, when copyright piracy occurs, the certificate of software copyright registration could be used as proof without examination. Also, it serves as a basis in law for national copyright administrative departments against piracy.

3. Served as investment by technology: According to a related regulation, “computer software can be used as investment by high and new technology, and the assessed price beyond 20% defined by Corporations Law and come to 35%.” Some local governments even noticed “100% software technology can be used as investment,” but must register the software copyright first.

4. Served as a basis to apply for technological achievement: According to a related regulation of the Ministry of Science and Technology: “to register technological achievement, one must submit <<registration form of technological achievement>>, as well. These include the first achievement of applying technology: related evaluation certificate (accreditation, acceptance report, entry qualification certificate, and new production certificate) as well as the report of development. Second, a certificate of intellectual property right (copyright certificate; registration certificate of software) as well as user's certificate.” Third, a registration certificate of the software refers to the certificate of copyright and software registration. Similar regulations can be found in other Ministries.

5. Served as tangible income if the corporation goes into bankruptcy: Copyright is considered as an “intangible asset.” It disappears when a corporation goes bankrupt. The vitality and value of an intangible asset are still in existence, and the tangible fund could be obtained in the process of transfer or auction. According to the regulation of computer software copyright registration, the time for registration of software copyright refers to the 30 working days after the receipt date.

== General provision ==
- Article 1. For the purpose of carrying out "Regulation for Computer Software Protection" (hereinafter referred to as "Regulation"), this regulation is formulated.
- Article 2. To promote the advancement of the software industry and improve the innovative and competitive capacity of the information industry of China, the national copyright administrative department encourages software registration and provides protection of the registered software.
- Article 3. This regulation is applicable to the registration of software copyright, exclusive license contract, as well as transfer contract.
- Article 4. The Applicant of software copyright should be the software copyright owner as well as the natural person, legal person, or other organization that owns copyright through inheritance or endorsement.

== Application for registration ==
- Article 7. The software for registration must be independently created by the creator, or developed as a modification of it (so long as with permission from the original creator) and must have great improvements in function and performance.
- Article 8. The registration of jointly created software can be made by any of the software copyright owners with the co-creators’ agreement. Any creator can submit their application without damaging co-creators’ benefit, but they must list the names of the co-creators.
- Article 9. Applicant must provide the following to the national copyright protection center: 1. Completed application form; 2. Software identifying materials; 3. Related certifying materials.
- Article 10. Software identifying materials include those related to programs and documents. The program and document must consist of the source program as well as the first and last 30 pages of any kind of document. The whole source program and the document must be provided if they are less than 60 pages. Except for particular cases, there are no less than 50 and 30 lines on every page of the program and documents respectively.
- Article 11. Applicant must submit all following certifying documents: 1. Identity documents of the natural person, legal person, or other organization; 2. Written contract on copyright owner or project assignment paper if there are; 3. Proof of consent to modify the original software should be submitted, if the software was developed from another; 4. Proof of inheritance or endorsement certificate should be submitted by the inheritor or endorsee.
- Article 12. Applicants can select one of the following ways as an additional deposit: 1. The first and last 30 pages of the source program, with the confidential parts that should not be beyond 50% of the source program, are covered by a black stripe; 2. The first 10 pages and any 50 consecutive pages of the source program; 3. The first and last 30 pages of the source program, as well as any 20 consecutive pages of the source program. Document submitted as additional deposit, in light of the above provision.
- Article 13. Applicants can apply to seal the source program, documents, or samples. Nobody will be allowed to remove the seal except the Applicant themselves and judicial authorities.
- Article 14. The software copyright owner can transfer contracts or consent to contract applications to the Chinese copyright protection center for contract registrations. The materials they must submit are: 1. Completed contract registration form; 2. A hard copy of the contract; 3. Identity document of the Applicant.
- Article 15. Applicants can request to withdraw the application at any time before it is approved.
- Article 16. The registrant of software copyright contract may request to revise or supplement registered items. The materials to be submitted include: 1. Complete application form for future revision or supplementation; 2. A hard copy of the registration certificate; 3. Revision- or supplementation-related materials.
- Article 17. The uniform forms made by Chinese copyright protection centers are used when applying for registration, and seal (signature) of the Applicant is required. The application forms must be filled in Chinese. The Chinese version of all certificates and proof documents must be provided if they are in any foreign language. The documents used to apply for registration must be printed on 297 x 210mm A4 papers.
- Article 18. Applicant's materials must be submitted or posted directly by registered mail and the name of Applicant, the title of the software, as well as the acceptance or registration number if there is, must be marked.

== Material needed ==
- 1. Complete application form of software copyright registration;
- 2. Materials to identify the software;
- 3. Related proof documents;
- 4. The program and document must consist of the source program as well as the first and last 30 pages of any kind of document. The whole source program and the document must be provided if they are less than 60 pages. Except for particular cases, there are no less than 50 lines and 30 lines on every page of the program and documents respectively;
- 5. Identity of a natural person, legal person, or other organization;
- 6. Contract on copyright owner or project assignment paper should be submitted if there are;
- 7. Proof of consent to modify original software from the copyright owner should be submitted if it is developed on the basis of original software;
- 8. Proof of inheritance or endorsement provided by inheritor or endorsee.
- 9. The first and last 30 pages of the source program, with the confidential parts that should not be beyond 50% of the source program, are covered by a black stripe.
- 10. The first 10 pages and any 50 consecutive pages of the source program.
- 11. The first and last 30 pages of the source program, as well as any 20 consecutive pages of the source program.

== Review and approval ==
- Article 19. The application belongs to articles 9 and 14 and will be proceeded on the day the materials listed in Chapter II are received. Then, a written notice will be sent to Applicant.
- Article 20. The Chinese copyright protection center should execute a complete review of the accepted application within 60 days after the day of approval and grant registration, certificate, and publicly announce the application that is in accordance with this "Regulation".
- Article 21. No registration will be made and will notify the Applicant if one of the following exists: 1. Forms submitted are incomplete and nonstandard, and no revision is made within the specified time limit; 2. Materials submitted are not software programs or documents stipulated in the "Regulation"; 3. The title of the program does not match with the obligee's signature, and no proof document is provided; 4. There is an ownership dispute for the software to be applied for registration.
- Article 22. Applicant must revise and supplement materials within 30 days if it is requested by the Chinese Copyright Protection Center, otherwise, the application will be withdrawn.
- Article 23. The national copyright bureau will revoke registration in the following circumstances: 1. The final judicial decision dictates so; 2. It was a decision of administrative penalty that was made by the copyright administration department.
- Article 24. The Chinese Copyright Protection Center may revoke registration according to Applicant's request.
- Article 25. The applicant may apply to reissue or renew the registration certificate when it is lost or damaged.

== Software registration announcement ==
- Article 26. Anyone may consult software registration announcements as well as documents related to registration.
- Article 27. The contents of the software registration announcement include: 1. Registration of software copyright; 2. Registered items on software copyright contract; 3. Information on invoking of software registration; 4. Other items.

== Fees ==
- Article 28. Fees that should be paid when applying for software registration or dealing with other items include: 1. Registration fee of software copyright; 2. Registration fee of software copyright contract; 3. Fee for revisional or supplemental registration; 4. Fee for registration certificate; 5. Seal and preservation fees; 6. Fee for additional deposit 7. Fee for inquiries; 8. Fee for registration invoking; 9. Other fees. The specific charge standards are set and announced by the national copyright bureau, together with the Council price department.
- Article 29. Fees are non-refundable if Applicant withdraws the application or the application is refused by registration organs.
- Article 30. Applicant must pay the fees listed in article 28 either directly, or through the post office, or bank, to the Chinese Copyright Protection.

== Supplementary provisions ==
- Article 31. The first day is not covered within the terms stipulated by the Chinese Copyright Protection Center. The expiry date is the corresponding day of the last month if the term is counted by year or by month; the expiry date is the last day if there exists no corresponding day in the month. If the expiry date is in a legal holiday, the first working day after the holiday is the expiry date.
- Article 32. The submission date of all documents to the Chinese Copyright Protection Center is the date of the postmark. The submission date is the received date if the postmark's date is unclear. The received date of documents posted by the Applicant is presumed on the 15th day if they are posted to the capitals of provinces, or on the 21st day if they are posted to other regions.
- Article 33. If the submission term is overdue due to force majeure or other reasonable factors, an applicant can apply to delay the submission date within the 30 days after the obstacle.
- Article 34. This regulation is interpreted, revised, and supplemented by the national copyright bureau.
- Article 35. This regulation shall come into effect from its promulgation. This document is the 1st decree of the national copyright bureau issued on Feb. 20th, 2002.
