= Assignment of copyright in software under Indian Copyright Act =

Ownership and assignment of copyright for computer software in India was addressed by the Delhi High Court in a judgment on Pine Labs Private Limited vs Gemalto Terminals India Private Limited and others (FAO 635 of 2009 and FAO 636 of 2009).

Justice A.K. Sikri and Justice Suresh Kait upheld Pine Labs' contention that the assignment of copyright in software developed by it for Gemalto came to an end after 5 years and thereafter, the copyright reverted to Pine Labs.

== Facts ==
Gemalto had engaged Pine Labs for the development of software for various programs including the one for the IOCL Fleet Card Program. A master service agreement (MSA) was signed in June 2004. Clause 7 of the MSA provided that Pine Labs " assigns" all copyright to Gemalto. Pursuant to the MSA, Pine Labs authored a computer program known as the Version 1.03 for the IOCL Fleet Card Program and a complete version of the same was provided to Gemalto in August 2004. Thereafter, certain other functionalities were added to the program and subsequent versions were also provided from time to time. In 2009, Pine Labs filed a suit in the Delhi high Court claiming that copyright had reverted to it as the assignment had expired by virtue of section 19(5) and 19(6) of the Indian Copyright Act. Section 19(5) and 19(6) provide that:

- 19(5) If the period of assignment is not stated, it shall be deemed to be five years from the date of assignment.
- 19 (6) If the territorial extent of assignment of the rights is not specified, it shall be presumed to extend within India.

== Injunction ==
Ex parte injunction was granted by the Single judge but was later vacated after hearing arguments. Pine Labs filed an appeal before the Division Bench. Division Bench initially granted interim stay and vide judgment dated 3 August 2011 ruled in favour of Pine Labs.

== Judgment ==
The bench observed that:

Since IOCL Fleet Program is developed by Pine Labs, which is the creator of the said Program as per Section 17 of the Copyright Act, Pine Labs would be the first owner of the copyright in this work. Section 18 of the Act, however, permits the copyright owner to assign the copyright either wholly or partially and either generally or subject to limitation and either for the whole term of the copyright or any part thereof. Section 19 of the Act stipulates the mode of assignment. Sub Section (1) thereof provides that in no uncertain term that assignment has to be in writing signed by the assignor or by his authorized agent. As per sub Section (2) of Section 19 of the Act, the assignment of the copyright, any such work is to identify such work and also specify the rights assigned and the “duration and territorial extent of such assignment”. Thus by agreement the assignment can be for a limited duration and limited territory. What happens if the agreement is silent on the duration and territorial extent of the assignment?

The Bench relied upon section 19(5) and 19(6) of the Copyright Act and came to the conclusion that:

as no duration or territorial extent is provided in agreement or any assignment deed, provisions of Section 19 (5) (6) of Copyright would be attracted.

Gemalto contended that the MSA was only an agreement to assign and not an assignment and it was the equitable owner of the copyright. As such, section 19(5) and 19(6) of the Copyright Act had no application and Pine Labs was liable to execute documents assigning the copyright to Gemalto. This contention was overruled by the Bench which concluded that section 19(5) and 19(6) of the Copyright Act applied whether the MSA was an agreement to assign or an assignment.

== Importance ==
This judgment is of significant importance in outsourcing contract/ commissioning works, not only for computer software but for all aspects where an author is contracted to write any literary work. Provisions of section 19(5) and 19(6) of the Copyright Act, which were inserted only in 1995 through an amendment, are unique to India and are often overlooked at the stage of drafting of contracts for assignment of copyright. This judgment clearly lays down that if the parties fail to provide for the period in the document by which assignment of copyright is made, then regardless of intention of the parties, the period of assignment would only be 5 years and the territory would only be the territory of India. Care should therefore be taken that if perpetual and worldwide assignment (or an assignment beyond 5 years) of copyright is envisaged by the parties, this should be specifically mentioned in the document through which assignment of copyright is made. Authors should note that in case of past assignments made by them, if more than 5 years have expired and the document of assignment did not specifically mention a term, the copyright may have reverted to them.
