= MDY Industries, LLC v. Blizzard Entertainment, Inc. =

Court case in the United States

MDY Industries, LLC v. Blizzard Entertainment, Inc and Vivendi Games, Inc.
- Court: United States Court of Appeals for the Ninth Circuit
- Decided: 14 December 2010

Holding
- MDY Industries was liable for contributory copyright infringement for selling software that caused Blizzard's customers to breach their End User License Agreement and Terms of Use contracts with Blizzard.

Court membership
- Judge sitting: Consuelo Maria Callahan

Keywords
- United States copyright law, First-sale doctrine

MDY Industries, LLC v. Blizzard Entertainment, Inc and Vivendi Games, Inc., 629 F.3d 928 (9th Cir. 2010), is a case decided by the United States Court of Appeals for the Ninth Circuit. At the district court level, MDY had been found liable under theories of copyright and tort law for selling software that contributed to the breach of Blizzard's End User License Agreement (EULA) and Terms of Use (ToU) governing the World of Warcraft video game software.

The court's ruling was appealed to the United States Court of Appeals for the Ninth Circuit, which reversed the district court in part, upheld in part, and remanded for further proceedings. The Court of Appeals ruled that for a software licensee's violation of a contract to constitute copyright infringement, there must be a nexus between the license condition and the licensor’s exclusive rights of copyright. However, the court also ruled, contrary to Chamberlain v. Skylink, that a finding of circumvention under the Digital Millennium Copyright Act does not require a nexus between circumvention and actual copyright infringement.

== Background Information ==
Blizzard Entertainment created and operates a popular online world video game known as World of Warcraft (WoW). WoW is a massively multiplayer online role-playing game, in which players control characters and complete a variety of tasks, such as exploring the landscape and performing quests. As players continue to play and succeed in their tasks, their characters gain various talents and skills.

Michael Donnelly, the founder of MDY Industries, LLC, created a software bot called Glider to play WoW for its users. Thus, Glider users were able to advance their WoW characters unattended.

MDY sought a declaratory judgment that the Glider program did not infringe upon rights owned by Blizzard. Blizzard contended in a counterclaim and a third-party complaint the following seven claims:

- tortious interference with contract
- contributory copyright infringement
- vicarious copyright infringement
- violation of the Digital Millennium Copyright Act (DMCA)
- trademark infringement
- unfair competition
- unjust enrichment

== Opinion of the District Court ==
On July 14, 2008, Judge David G. Campbell of the U.S. District Court for the District of Arizona granted and denied in part the parties' motions for summary judgment. The Court granted summary judgment in favor of Blizzard with respect to MDY's liability for tortious interference, contributory copyright infringement, and vicarious copyright infringement. The court granted summary judgment in favor of MDY on a portion of the DMCA claim and on the unfair competition claim.

In its ruling on Blizzard's contributory copyright infringement claims, the district court first considered whether purchasers of WoW were legal "owners" of the client software. According to 17 U.S.C. § 117, owners of computer programs are allowed to create copies or adaptations of the computer program if it is an essential step towards utilization of the program.

The Court agreed with Blizzard's arguments that WoW purchasers were not legal owners of the game software but instead licensees, in line with the prior Ninth Circuit ruling in Vernor v. Autodesk, Inc.. As licensees, players are required to make use of the software within the scope of the End User License Agreement. In the terms of that agreement, Blizzard specifically prohibited "the use of bots or third-party software to modify the WoW experience." Thus, the Court found that players who use the Glider program violated the ToU and were not licensed to use WoW.

As with most software, the client software of WoW is copied during the program's operation from the computer's hard drive to the computer's random access memory (RAM). Citing the prior Ninth Circuit case of MAI Systems Corp. v. Peak Computer, Inc., 991 F.2d 511, 518-19 (9th Cir. 1993), the district court held that RAM copying constituted "copying" under 17 U.S.C. § 106.

The Court found that since the prohibition on botting was a prohibition related to Blizzard's copyright interest in WoW, users of Glider infringed Blizzard's copyright when played the game in violation of the license. The Court believed MDY to be encouraging and profiting from this copyright infringement, and therefore found MDY secondarily liable for the infringement.

The district court also ruled that Glider users had violated the Digital Millennium Copyright Act by using Glider to circumvent Blizzard's Warden program, a security application that controls access to the World of Warcraft game environment.

== Appeal ==
MDY Industries appealed the judgment of the district court, and a judgment was delivered by the Ninth Circuit Court of Appeals on 14 December 2010. In the ruling, the summary judgment against MDY for contributory copyright infringement was reversed. The court ruled that "for a licensee's violation of a contract to constitute copyright infringement, there must be a nexus between the condition and the licensor's exclusive rights of copyright. Here, WoW players do not commit copyright infringement by using Glider in violation of the [terms of use]".

In the judgment, the Ninth Circuit considered Chamberlain v. Skylink (in the Federal Circuit), but declined to follow that case, stating that "were we to follow Chamberlain in imposing an infringement nexus requirement, we would have to disregard the plain language of the statute". The court therefore upheld the judgment that MDY violated the provisions of the Digital Millennium Copyright Act against trafficking in copyright circumvention technologies, at least with regard to the dynamic nonliteral elements of Blizzard's content, i.e., those portions provided by the World of Warcraft servers.

The summary judgment for tortious contract interference was vacated and remanded to the district court for further consideration because the requirements for summary judgment - that as a matter of law, judgment could only possibly be found in favor of one party even when all disputed facts are considered in a light most favorable to the other party - were not met.

== See also ==
- Universal Music Group v. Augusto another first-sale doctrine case
