= CONTU =

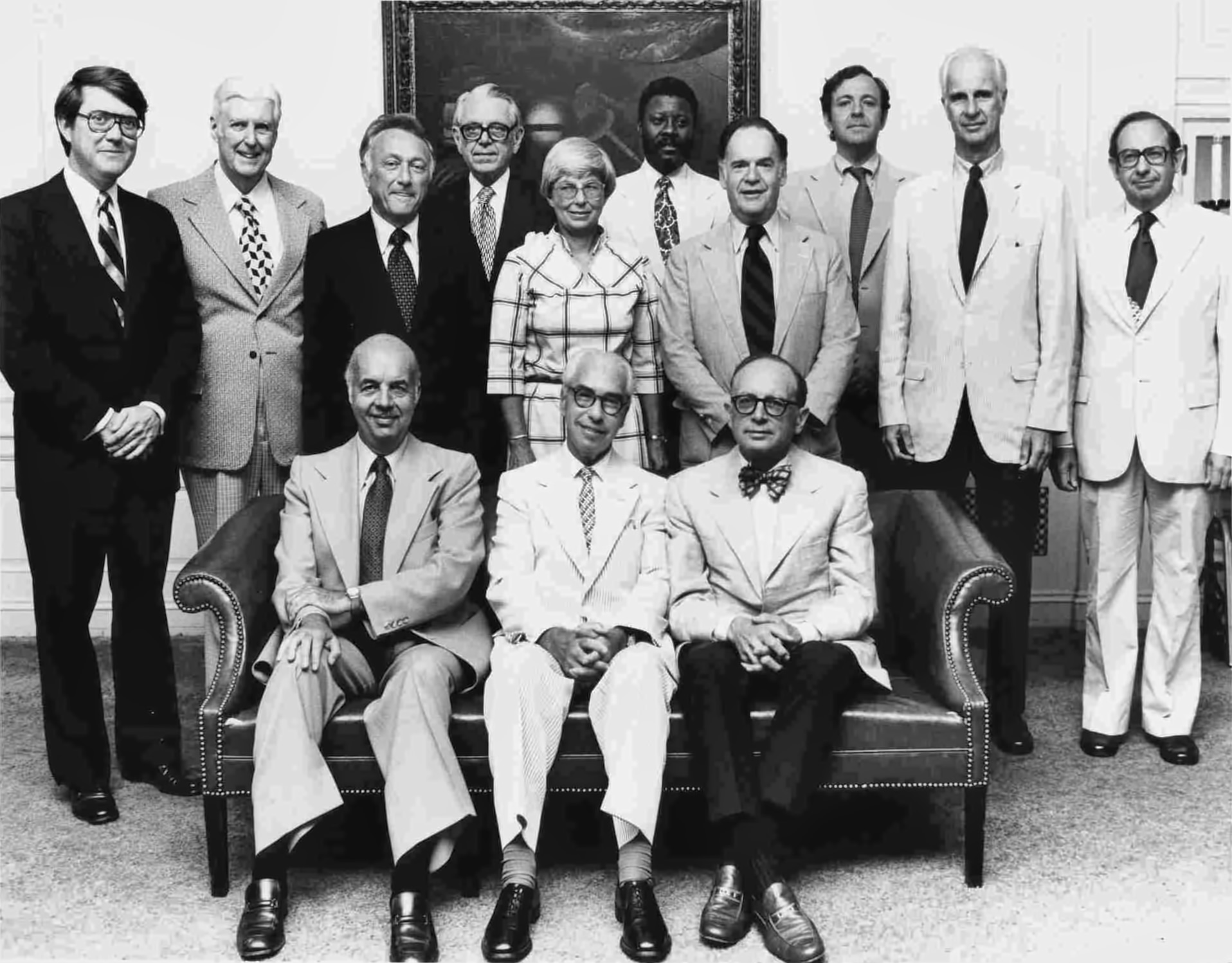
commissioners and staff

CONTU, or the Commission on New Technological Uses of Copyrighted Works, was created to study issues associated with copyrighted works in computers and computer-related works. It was established in 1974 by the 93rd United States Congress for a period of three years as part of an effort to revise U.S. copyright law. The commission presented its final report on 31 July 1978. It recommended that computer programs be explicitly protected by copyright law. Its recommendations were largely implemented in the Computer Software Copyright Act of 1980 that became effective on December 12. It added a definition of the term "computer program" to 17 U.S.C. § 101 and amending § 117 to allow the owner of the program to make an additional copy or adaptation for use on a computer. It has been argued that the Commission erred in recommending the extension of copyright to machine-readable computer programs, because of the functionality of programs and the limit of Copyright on Useful Articles .

== See also ==
- Software copyright
