= UMG Recordings, Inc. v. Augusto =

Universal Music Group v. Augusto
- Court: United States District Court for the Central District of California
- Decided: June 10, 2008
- Citation: 558 F. Supp. 2d 1055

Keywords
- United States copyright law, First-sale doctrine

Universal Music Group v. Augusto was a federal court case filed by Universal Music Group against Troy Augusto, a man who sold promotional CDs on eBay. UMG claimed that the CDs were their property, and Augusto's sales constituted copyright infringement. On January 4, 2011, the Ninth Circuit sided with Augusto, holding that "UMG's distribution of the promotional CDs under the circumstances effected a sale (transfer of title) of the CDs to the recipients. Further sale of those copies was therefore permissible without UMG's authorization."

== Background ==
UMG claimed that their promotional CDs marked "promotional use only" are their property for eternity and cannot be resold.

Augusto deceives potential eBay buyers by speciously claiming that he has the right, under U.S. copyright law, to sell the "Promo CDs" under the "first sale doctrine" embodied in 17 U.S.C. § 109. (In fact, since "Promo CDs" are never sold, only licensed, that doctrine simply does not apply.)

The Electronic Frontier Foundation stepped in on behalf of Augusto and claimed that Augusto has the right to resell the CDs under the first sale doctrine. Joe Gratz of Durie Tangri represented Augusto.

Augusto admits that under 17 U.S.C. § 109 he is entitled, without the authority of the copyright owner, to sell or otherwise dispose of the possession of CDs he owns, including the CDs at issue in this action. Augusto admits that the limitation on a copyright holder's distribution right set forth in 17 U.S.C. § 109 is sometimes referred to as the "first sale doctrine." Augusto admits that he has cited 17 U.S.C. § 109 from time to time in his auction descriptions. Augusto denies the remaining allegations in this paragraph.

Augusto argued that he owned title to the CD copies he sold under three theories.

1. The printed licenses on the promo CDs were invalid
2. The original recipients were allowed to treat the CDs as a gift according to federal law
3. The CDs were abandoned by UMG according to California law

If any one of these were upheld by the court, Augusto would win. The court supported both 1 and 2 but rejected 3, and thus ruled that UMG transferred title of the CDs to the original recipients. Therefore, Augusto was the owner of the CDs when he sold them and was not violating UMG's rights.

Augusto had also counter-sued UMG for the obstruction of his business.

== Ruling ==
In a court order issued June 10, 2008, the United States District Court for the Central District of California established that the first sale doctrine is indeed valid in this case. The court rejected the counter-suit claim, finding that UMG acted in good faith when claiming their copyright.

Augusto appealed this decision to the Ninth Circuit Court of Appeals, which affirmed the decision.

== See also ==
- Electronic Frontier Foundation (EFF)
- Vernor v. Autodesk, Inc. another first-sale doctrine case
- MDY Indus. LLC v. Blizzard Entm't, Inc. another first-sale doctrine case
