= Phonorecord =

Term of art in U.S. copyright law

"Monkeys Spinning Monkeys"
This MP3 file is an example of a phonorecord, a digital file embodying both a musical work (the composition "Monkeys Spinning Monkeys") and a particular sound recording of that composition.

In United States copyright law, phonorecord is a term of art for a material object that embodies sounds (other than those accompanying audiovisual recordings such as movies).

From the Copyright Act of 1976: “Phonorecords” are material objects in which sounds, other than those accompanying a motion picture or other audiovisual work, are fixed by any method now known or later developed, and from which the sounds can be perceived, reproduced, or otherwise communicated, either directly or with the aid of a machine or device. The term “phonorecords” includes the material object in which the sounds are first fixed.

For example: all of the following are "phonorecords" under the law: A wire recording; a 16-, 33-, 45- or 78-rpm phonograph record (vinyl disc), a reel-to-reel tape, an 8-track tape, a compact cassette tape, a compact disc, an audio DVD, and an MP3 file stored on a computer, compact disc or USB flash drive.

To explain the legal distinction between definitions, suppose a person or group takes a song and makes a performance. The recorded performance is a sound recording (also called phonogram); the physical media that the sound recording is stored upon is a phonorecord.

== Digital phonorecord delivery ==
Digital phonorecord delivery (DPD) refers to an "individual digital transmission of a sound recording resulting in a specifically identifiable reproduction by or for a recipient, regardless of whether the digital transmission is also a public performance of the sound recording or any underlying nondramatic musical work." DPDs include permanent downloads, limited downloads, and interactive streams. The term digital phonorecord delivery was introduced in Copyright Office interim regulations in November 2008.
