= Vernor v. Autodesk, Inc. =

United States district court case

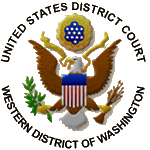
- Court: United States District Court for the Western District of Washington
- Decided: May 20, 2008
- Citation: 555 F. Supp. 2d 1164

Case history
- Subsequent actions: Vernor v. Autodesk, Inc., 2009 U.S. Dist. LEXIS 90906 (W.D. Wash., Sep. 30, 2009) (granting summary judgment for Vernor).

Holding
- Autodesk's motion to dismiss denied because Autodesk distributed copies of its software in transactions that, despite the inclusion of a restrictive license agreement, were best characterized as sales of the copies, giving rise to a right to redistribute those copies under the first-sale doctrine. (Reversed and Remanded on appeal by 9th Cir.)

Court membership
- Judge sitting: Richard A. Jones

Keywords
- United States copyright law, First-sale doctrine, Software licensing

Vernor v. Autodesk, Inc. was a 2010 case in the United States District Court for the Western District of Washington regarding the applicability of the first-sale doctrine to software sold under the terms of so-called "shrinkwrap licensing." The court held that when the transfer of software to the purchaser materially resembled a sale (non-recurring price, right to perpetual possession of copy) it was, in fact, a "sale with restrictions on use" giving rise to a right to resell the copy under the first-sale doctrine. As such, Autodesk could not pursue an action for copyright infringement against Vernor, who sought to resell used versions of its software on eBay. The decision was appealed to the United States Court of Appeals for the Ninth Circuit, which issued a decision on September 10, 2010, reversing the first-sale doctrine ruling and remanding for further proceedings on the misuse of copyright claim. The Ninth Circuit's decision asserted that its ruling was compelled by Ninth Circuit precedent, but observed that the policy considerations involved in the case might affect motion pictures and libraries as well as sales of used software.

The net effect of the Ninth Circuit's ruling is to limit the "You bought it, you own it" principle asserted by such organizations as the Electronic Frontier Foundation (or EFF).

== Claims ==
Under the first-sale doctrine, copyright holders give up the right to control the distribution of copies of their works after an initial first sale to the original purchaser. Informally, owners of copies of copyrighted works (books, music, etc.) have the right to sell or dispose of their copies of the work without restriction and without the need to seek permission from the copyright holder. Vernor claimed that he purchased "authentic, used copies" of Autodesk software, and that he never opened, installed, or agreed to the included license terms, and was within his rights to resell those copies of the software without interference by Autodesk. He further claimed that Autodesk's use of the DMCA to inhibit these sales constituted an unlawful restraint of trade.

Autodesk counter claimed that copies of its software were licensed, not sold to the original parties. Thus, in Autodesk's view, the first-sale doctrine did not apply - the original parties were never owners of their copies and so had no authority to resell the software to Vernor. Thus Vernor was infringing Autodesk's copyright and Autodesk was within their rights to block such sales. Autodesk also contended that, as the CD was a mechanism for making a copy of the software, Vernor enabled his clients to make unlicensed copies of Autodesk software and Vernor was liable for contributory copyright infringement. Finally, Autodesk claimed that in purchasing the software from a licensee, Vernor was bound by the terms of that license - despite never having agreed to it. This last claim was dismissed by the court.

An important aspect of this case is that CTA, who originally bought the software, had purchased an upgrade to it and then sold the older versions. This potentially raises a different specific issue about the legality of re-selling upgraded software versus just selling used software.

== Conflicting precedent? ==
As the district court analyzed the case, the crucial issue was whether the transfer of the copy of the software from Autodesk was a sale or a license. If sales, then Vernor would prevail, but if licenses, Autodesk would prevail. In trying to determine the controlling precedent, the district court focused on four cases from the Ninth Circuit. The oldest case addressed the classification of sales and transactions for the purposes of first sale doctrine explicitly in the context of the transfer of motion picture film prints. The last three, to the extent they focused on the issue of classifying the nature of software transactions at all, did so in the context of section 117 of the U.S. Copyright Act:

Notwithstanding the provisions of section 106, it is not an infringement for the owner of a copy of a computer program to make or authorize the making of another copy or adaptation of that computer program provided [that the owner meets two conditions.]

The findings of these cases were as follows:

- United States v. Wise (9th Cir. 1977).

In United States v. Wise, which directly addressed the classification of sales and licenses for the purposes of first sale with respect to film prints, the court found that the crucial factor was whether the transaction gave rise to a right of perpetual possession in the transferee. If the transferee was entitled to keep the copy acquired from the copyright holder, it was a sale. If the transferee was required to return the copy, it was not a sale.

- MAI Sys. Corp. v. Peak Computer (9th Cir. 1993).

In MAI Sys. Corp. v. Peak Computer, the court considered the claim that loading a program into RAM constituted making a copy for the purposes of copyright infringement. The court found that it did and further stated in a footnote (without explanation and without citing to any supporting precedent) that "since MAI licensed its software, [its] customers do not qualify as 'owners' of the software and are not eligible for protection under 117." The MAI decision has been extensively criticized, a fact recognized by the Ninth Circuit itself in Wall Data and the primary holding of MAI was overruled by a statutory change to 17 U.S.C. § 117 made by Congress as a rider to the Digital Millennium Copyright Act, but only for purposes of "machine maintenance or repair."

- Triad Sys. Corp. v. Southeastern Express Co. (9th Cir. 1995).

In Triad Sys. Corp. v. Southeastern Express Co., the court implicitly distinguished between owners of copies of software and non-owners by contrasting those that purchased "the software outright", who were presumed to have section 117 rights, with those who did not. The court cited MAI, but not earlier precedent.

- Wall Data v. Los Angeles County Sheriff's Dept. (9th Cir. 2006).

In Wall Data v. Los Angeles County Sheriff's Dept, the court determined that the presence of a license with restrictions was "sufficient to classify the transaction as a grant of license to Wall Data's software, and not a sale of Wall Data's software." Again, the court cited MAI, but not earlier precedent.

== District court's analysis ==
The district court found the precedents cited above to be in direct, irreconcilable conflict. Under the MAI, Triad, and Wall Data cases, the transfer of software from Autodesk accompanied by a restrictive license, would not be a sale and the first-sale doctrine would not apply, and thus Vernor would not be permitted to redistribute the software. However, under United States v. Wise, the transfer of copies of Autodesk's software would be considered sales, because the realities of the transfers imply a right of perpetual possession of the copy, and so Vernor would be protected under the first-sale doctrine. Given the conflicting precedents, the court felt compelled to rely on the earliest precedent, Wise, and thus found in Vernor's favor. The earliest precedent is followed because a panel of Circuit judges are bound by stare decisis to follow their court's prior panel decisions and only depart from them if there has been intervening Supreme Court precedent on point or an en banc decision of the Circuit holding otherwise.

The district court also rejected Autodesk's assertion that Vernor was bound by license terms of software he did not install or agree to. The court cited both "thorny issues" of implicit consent and the absurdity of asserting the transferability of a license that, by the definition of its terms, was nontransferable.

== Ninth Circuit's Analysis ==
Judge Consuelo Callahan, writing for the Ninth Circuit, agreed with the district court that the crucial issue was whether the arrangement was a sale or a license. Vernor v. Autodesk, Inc., No. 09-35969, slip op. at 13871-72. The Ninth Circuit's holding is that the transaction is a license. Its analysis covers the same four cases analyzed by the district court, but derives different principles from them:

We read Wise and the MAI trio to prescribe three considerations that we may use to determine whether a software user is a licensee, rather than an owner of a copy. First, we consider whether the copyright owner specifies that a user is granted a license. Second, we consider whether the copyright owner significantly restricts the user’s ability to transfer the software. Finally, we consider whether the copyright owner imposes notable use restrictions. [Footnote omitted.] Our holding reconciles the MAI trio and Wise, even though the MAI trio did not cite Wise. See Cisneros-Perez v. Gonzales, 451 F.3d 1053, 1058 (9th Cir. 2006) ('[W]e are required to reconcile prior precedents if we can do so.')

Slip op. at 13878. Those principles favor Autodesk:

Autodesk retained title to the software and imposed significant transfer restrictions: it stated that the license is nontransferable, the software could not be transferred or leased without Autodesk’s written consent, and the software could not be transferred outside the Western Hemisphere. The SLA also imposed use restrictions against the use of the software outside the Western Hemisphere and against modifying, translating, or reverse-engineering the software, removing any proprietary marks from the software or documentation, or defeating any copy protection device. Furthermore, the SLA provided for termination of the license upon the licensee’s unauthorized copying or failure to comply with other license restrictions. Thus, because Autodesk reserved title to Release 14 copies and imposed significant transfer and use restrictions, we conclude that its customers are licensees of their copies of Release 14 rather than owners.

CTA was a licensee rather than an 'owner of a particular copy' of Release 14, and it was not entitled to resell its Release 14 copies to Vernor under the first sale doctrine. 17 U.S.C. § 109(a). Therefore, Vernor did not receive title to the copies from CTA and accordingly could not pass ownership on to others. Both CTA’s and Vernor’s sales infringed Autodesk’s exclusive right to distribute copies of its work. Id. § 106(3).

Slip op. at 13880.

The Ninth Circuit observed that because the district court had relied on the "first sale" doctrine, it had not reached Vernor's claim that Autodesk had misused its copyright, and the Ninth Circuit therefore remanded that second claim for further proceedings. Slip op. at 13887.

== Implications ==
=== The ruling ===
The district court's ruling tried to harmonize used-software sales with the first-sale doctrine consumers are familiar with in the context of used books, music CDs, and movie DVDs by treating used copies of software similarly. Shrinkwrap licensing is widely used in an attempt to enforce restrictions that would otherwise be considered fair use under copyright laws. Common terms imposed by these licenses include the prohibition of resale, modification, and/or reverse engineering. Under the district court's Vernor v. Autodesk ruling, the enforceability of these terms would have had to be weighed against the countervailing policies implicit in the Copyright Act.

The Ninth Circuit's decision sets out a summary of the policy questions involved and suggests that Congress could amend the statute if it wanted a different result. Here's the analysis:

Although our holding today is controlled by our precedent, we recognize the significant policy considerations raised by the parties and amici on both sides of this appeal."

Autodesk, the Software & Information Industry Association ('SIIA'), and the Motion Picture Association of America ('MPAA') have presented policy arguments that favor our result. For instance, Autodesk argues in favor of judicial enforcement of software license agreements that restrict transfers of copies of the work. Autodesk contends that this (1) allows for tiered pricing for different software markets, such as reduced pricing for students or educational institutions; (2) increases software companies’ sales; (3) lowers prices for all consumers by spreading costs among a large number of purchasers; and (4) reduces the incidence of piracy by allowing copyright owners to bring infringement actions against unauthorized resellers. SIIA argues that a license can exist even where a customer (1) receives his copy of the work after making a single payment and (2) can indefinitely possess a software copy, because it is the software code and associated rights that are valuable rather than the inexpensive discs on which the code may be stored. Also, the MPAA argues that a customer’s ability to possess a copyrighted work indefinitely should not compel a finding of a first sale, because there is often no practically feasible way for a consumer to return a copy to the copyright owner.

Vernor, eBay, and the American Library Association ('ALA') have presented policy arguments against our decision. Vernor contends that our decision (1) does not vindicate the law’s aversion to restraints on alienation of personal property; (2) may force everyone purchasing copyrighted property to trace the chain of title to ensure that a first sale occurred; and (3) ignores the economic realities of the relevant transactions, in which the copyright owner permanently released software copies into the stream of commerce without expectation of return in exchange for upfront payment of the full software price. eBay contends that a broad view of the first sale doctrine is necessary to facilitate the creation of secondary markets for copyrighted works, which contributes to the public good by (1) giving consumers additional opportunities to purchase and sell copyrighted works, often at below-retail prices; (2) allowing consumers to obtain copies of works after a copyright owner has ceased distribution; and (3) allowing the proliferation of businesses.

The ALA contends that the first sale doctrine facilitates the availability of copyrighted works after their commercial lifespan, by inter alia enabling the existence of libraries, used bookstores, and hand-to-hand exchanges of copyrighted materials. The ALA further contends that judicial enforcement of software license agreements, which are often contracts of adhesion, could eliminate the software resale market, require used computer sellers to delete legitimate software prior to sale, and increase prices for consumers by reducing price competition for software vendors. It contends that Autodesk’s position (1) undermines 17 U.S.C. § 109(b)(2), which permits non-profit libraries to lend software for non-commercial purposes, and (2) would hamper efforts by non-profits to collect and preserve out-of-print software. The ALA fears that the software industry’s licensing practices could be adopted by other copyright owners, including book publishers, record labels, and movie studios.

These are serious contentions on both sides, but they do not alter our conclusion that our precedent from Wise through the MAI trio requires the result we reach. Congress is free, of course, to modify the first sale doctrine and the essential step defense if it deems these or other policy considerations to require a different approach.

Slip op. at 13885-86.

=== Reaction to the ruling ===
The EFF believes that this will lead to more litigation as other software vendors try to find ways to restrict sales of second-hand software, as well as other owners of intellectual property. Some retailers are worried that the ruling could affect selling used video games as well. Gregory Beck from Public Citizen who is Vernor's attorney says that the ruling will have a chilling effect on the used software market.

On October 1, 2010, Vernor filed a petition for the case to be reheard en banc. Autodesk filed its reply on November 10, 2010. The Ninth Circuit denied the request on January 18, 2011. The Supreme Court denied Vernor's petition for certiorari in October 2011.

== See also ==
- UMG v. Augusto another current "first-sale doctrine" case
- MDY v. Blizzard another current "first-sale doctrine" case

== External references ==
- Vernor v. Autodesk, Response to cross-motion to dismiss.
- Vernor v. Autodesk, Complaint No. 2:07-cv-01189-JLR.
- Vernor v. Autodesk, Autodesk's Motion to Dismiss No. 2:07-cv-01189-RAJ.
- Vernor v. Autodesk, Response to Motion to Dismiss No. 2:07-cv-01189-RAJ.
- Vernor v. Autodesk, Reply Brief.
- Vernor v. Autodesk, Order Denying Motion to Dismiss and Summary Judgment.
- Vernor v. Autodesk, Order granting (in part) Vernor's motion for summary judgment (Sep. 30, 2009).
