= Pine Labs =

Indian merchant platform company

Pine Labs Limited
- Type: Public
- Traded as: NSE: PINELABS; BSE: 544606
- Industry: Fintech
- Founded: 1998; 28 years ago
- Founders: Lokvir Kapoor; Rajul Garg
- Headquarters: Noida, Uttar Pradesh, India (corporate office); Gurgaon, Haryana, India (registered office)
- Area served: India, Middle East, Southeast Asia
- Key people: Lokvir Kapoor (Executive chairman); B. Amrish Rau (CEO)
- Products: myPlutus app, Plutus Smart, Pine Labs Genie, Plural
- Revenue: ▲₹2,274 crore (US$240 million) (FY25)
- Net income: ▼₹−145 crore (US$−15 million) (FY25)
- Subsidiaries: Qwikcilver Solutions Pvt Ltd.
- Website: pinelabs.com

Pine Labs is an Indian multinational Financial Technology company headquartered in Noida, Uttar Pradesh, that provides point of sale (POS) systems and payment systems. Founded in 1998, it facilitates digital payments through Android-based POS machines that are primarily used by retailers in India, UAE, and Malaysia.

== History ==
The company was founded in 1998 by Lokvir Kapoor and Rajul Garg. The company initially provided petroleum retail automation services before becoming a payments products and services firm for merchants, selling POS terminals. In 2004, Pine Labs ventured into mainstream payments and financial offerings for merchants.

On 19 March 2019, Pine Labs announced that it would acquire the Indian gift card solutions company Qwikcilver for US$110 Million.

In February 2019, the company partnered with RAKBANK to launch a payment platform in the UAE. In March 2018, Google Pay and Pine Labs partnered for offline payments offerings in India. The company partnered with UnionPay in January 2019.

In April 2021, Pine Labs acquired Southeast Asian deals and cash-back platform Fave for $45 million. Fave's co-founders Joel Neoh, Yeoh Chen Chow, and Arzumy MD, continued working in the company.

In August 2021, the company suffered a data breach exposing the data of up to 500,000 of its users to hackers.

In January 2022, Pine Labs filed confidentially for an initial public offering (IPO) with the U.S. Securities and Exchange Commission seeking to raise about $500 million.

On 21 May 2024, Pine Labs received approval from Singapore Court to dissolve its Singapore branch. In August 2024, it obtained approval from the National Company Law Tribunal for its planned merger of its Indian and Singaporean entities.

In February 2026, OpenAI and Pine Labs announced a strategic partnership to develop AI-driven agentic commerce solution.

Pine Labs partnered with six lenders to launch SignalIQ, an AI credit underwriting tool. The company also plans to introduce corporate meal and expense cards by October 2026.

== Funding ==
Pine Labs raised US$600 million in a late-stage funding round ahead of its planned initial public offering (IPO).

In March 2018, the company raised $82 million (₹530 crore) from Actis Capital, a private equity fund, and Altimeter Capital, a California-based investment company. In May 2018, Pine Labs raised $125 million (₹843 crore) from Temasek Holdings and PayPal, making it a unicorn startup company valued over $1 billion.

In January 2020, it raised an undisclosed sum from Mastercard. In December 2020, it raised US$75-$100 million led by US-based billionaire Stephen Mandel's hedge fund Lone Pine Capital at a valuation of more than US$2 billion. In July 2021, it raised $325 million at a valuation of $3.5 billion from Fidelity and BlackRock.

In 2022, the company raised $150 million from Alpha Wave at a valuation of US$5 billion.

== Products and services ==
The company provides point-of-sale POS devices that enables merchants to process credit and debit card payments.

== See also ==
- List of unicorn startup companies
- Payment and settlement systems in India
