= Exclusive right =

Legal power to do or receive something, and to allow/deny others the right to the same

An exclusive right, or exclusivity, is a de facto, non-tangible prerogative existing in law (that is, the power or, in a wider sense, right) to perform an action or acquire a benefit and to permit or deny others the right to perform the same action or to acquire the same benefit. Exclusive rights are a form of monopoly.

Exclusive rights can be established by law or by contractual obligation, but the scope of enforceability will depend upon the extent to which others are bound by the instrument establishing the exclusive right; thus in the case of contractual rights, only persons that are parties to a contract will be affected by the exclusivity.

Exclusive rights may be granted in property law, copyright law, patent law, in relation to public utilities, or, in some jurisdictions, in other sui generis legislation. Many scholars argue that such rights form the basis for the concepts of property and ownership.

Privately granted rights, created by contract. Contract killing, may occasionally appear very similar to exclusive rights, but are only enforceable against the grantee, and not the world at large.

A "prerogative" is in effect an exclusive right. The term is restricted for use for official state or sovereign (i.e., constitutional) powers.

== Types of exclusive rights ==
=== Property ===
In relation to property, an exclusive right will, for the most part, arise when something tangible is acquired; as a result, others are prevented from exercising control of that thing. For example, a person may prohibit others from entering and using their land, or from taking their personal possessions. However, an exclusive right is not necessarily absolute, as an easement may allow a certain level of public access to private property

An exclusivity agreement (also known as a lock-out agreement) may be entered into where two parties are planning the sale of a property but have not yet reached complete agreement or concluded a contract for the sale. The exclusivity agreement will prevent the proposed seller from negotiating a sale with any other potential purchaser for a fixed period of time.

=== Intellectual property ===
Most jurisdictions recognize a bundle of exclusive rights in relation to works of authorship, inventions, and identifications of origin. These rights are sometimes spoken of under the umbrella term "intellectual property."

== History and arguments ==
In common law jurisdictions, exclusive rights have often been the codification of pre-existing social norms with regard to land or chattels.

In the UK case of RCS v Pollard [1983], Ch 135, a claim by the legal owners of an exclusive right in relation to the records of the singer Elvis Presley against a seller of unofficial recordings was lost because selling the unofficial recordings did not interfere with the Presley estate's liberty to exercise their exclusive right.

In continental Europe there is a view that copyrights, patents, and the like are the codification of some kind of moral right, natural right, or personality right. However, such arguments can only be consistently justified through instrumentalism or consequentialism, as exemplified by the reasoning inferred in Article One of the United States Constitution that copyrights and patents exist solely "To promote the Progress of Science and useful Arts".

== See also ==
- Moral rights
- Natural and legal rights
