= First-sale doctrine =

Type of intellectual property doctrine

The first-sale doctrine (also sometimes referred to as the "right of first sale" or the "first sale rule") is a legal concept that limits the rights of an intellectual property owner to control resale of products embodying its intellectual property. The doctrine enables the distribution chain of copyrighted products, library lending, giving, video rentals and secondary markets for copyrighted works (for example, enabling individuals to sell their legally purchased books or CDs to others). In trademark law, this same doctrine enables reselling of trademarked products after the trademark holder puts the products on the market. In the case of patented products, the doctrine allows resale of patented products without any control from the patent holder. The first sale doctrine does not apply to patented processes, which are instead governed by the patent exhaustion doctrine.

== Overview of copyright law application ==
Copyright law grants a copyright holder an exclusive right "to distribute copies or phonorecords of the copyrighted work to the public by sale or other transfer of ownership, or by rental, lease, or lending". This is called a "distribution right" and differs from the copyright holder's "reproduction right" which involves making copies of the copyrighted works. Rather than the right to copy, the distribution right involves the right to transfer physical copies or phonorecords (i.e., recorded music) of the copyrighted work. For example, the distribution right could be infringed when a retailer acquires and sells to the public unlawfully made audio or video tapes. Although the retailer may not have copied the work in any way and may not have known that the tapes were made unlawfully, they nevertheless infringe the distribution right by the sale. The distribution right allows the copyright holder to seek redress from any member in the chain of distribution.

The first-sale doctrine creates a basic exception to the copyright holder's distribution right. Once the work is lawfully sold or even transferred gratuitously, the copyright holder's interest in the material object in which the copyrighted work is embodied is exhausted. The owner of the material object can then dispose of it as they see fit. Thus, one who buys a copy of a book is entitled to resell it, rent it, give it away, or destroy it. However, the owner of the copy of the book will not be able to make new copies of the book because the first-sale doctrine does not limit the restrictions allowed by the copyright holder's reproduction right. The rationale of the doctrine is to prevent the copyright holder from restraining the free alienability of goods. Without the doctrine, a possessor of a copy of a copyrighted work would have to negotiate with the copyright holder every time they wished to dispose of their copy. After the initial transfer of ownership of a legal copy of a copyrighted work, the first-sale doctrine eliminates the copyright holder's right to control ownership of that specific copy.

The doctrine was first recognized by the Supreme Court of the United States in 1908 (see Bobbs-Merrill Co. v. Straus) and subsequently codified in the Copyright Act of 1909. In the Bobbs-Merrill case, the publisher, Bobbs-Merrill, had inserted a notice in its books that any retail sale at a price under $1.00 would constitute an infringement of its copyright. The defendants, who owned Macy's department store, disregarded the notice and sold the books at a lower price without Bobbs-Merrill's consent. The Supreme Court held that the exclusive statutory right to "vend" applied only to the first sale of the copyrighted work.

Today, this rule of law is codified in 17 U.S.C. § 109(a), which provides:

Notwithstanding the provisions of section 106 (3), the owner of a particular copy or phonorecord lawfully made under this title, or any person authorized by such owner, is entitled, without the authority of the copyright holder, to sell or otherwise dispose of the possession of that copy or phonorecord.

The elements of the first sale doctrine can be summarized as follows: (1) the copy was lawfully made with the authorization of the copyright holder; (2) ownership of the copy was initially transferred under the copyright holder's authority; (3) the defendant is a lawful owner of the copy in question; and (4) the defendant's use implicates the distribution right only; not the reproduction or some other right given to the copyright holder.

Although copyright has always been treated as a limited territorial right, in 2013 in Kirtsaeng v. John Wiley & Sons, Inc. the US Supreme Court eliminated the territorial restriction on the first sale. Since then, copyrighted products legally bought abroad (often at a lower price) can be legally imported and sold in the US without any post-sale restrictions.

=== Limitations ===
The first sale doctrine only limits the distribution rights of copyright holders. This principle sometimes clashes with the holder's other rights, such as the right of reproduction and derivative work rights. For example, in Lee v. A.R.T. Co., the defendant bought plaintiff's artworks in the form of notecards and then mounted them on ceramic tiles, covering the artworks with transparent epoxy resin. Despite plaintiff's assertion of violation of his right to prepare derivative works, the 7th Circuit held that the derivative work right was not violated and that defendant's sale of the tiles was protected under the first sale doctrine. However, based on very similar facts, the 9th Circuit in Mirage Editions, Inc. v. Albuquerque A.R.T. Company held that plaintiff's right to prepare derivative works was infringed and that the first sale doctrine did not protect the defendant under such circumstances.

=== Application to digital copies ===
The first-sale doctrine does not neatly fit transfers of copies of digital works because an actual transfer does not actually happen—instead, the recipient receives a new copy of the work while, at the same time, the sender has the original copy (unless that copy is deleted, either automatically or manually). For example, this exact issue played out in Capitol Records, LLC v. ReDigi Inc., a case involving an online marketplace for pre-owned digital music.

E-books have the same issue. Because the first sale doctrine does not apply to electronic books, libraries cannot freely lend e-books indefinitely after purchase. Instead, electronic book publishers came up with business models to sell the subscriptions to the license of the text. This results in e-book publishers placing restrictions on the number of times an e-book can circulate and/or the amount of time a book is within a collection before a library's license expires, then the book no longer belongs to them.

The question is whether the first-sale doctrine should be retooled to reflect the realities of the digital age. Physical copies degrade over time, whereas digital information may not. Works in digital format can be reproduced without any flaws and can be disseminated worldwide without much difficulty. Thus, applying the first sale doctrine to digital copies affects the market for the original to a greater degree than transfers of physical copies. The U.S. Copyright Office stated that "[t]he tangible nature of a copy is a defining element of the first sale doctrine and critical to its rationale."

The Court of Justice of the European Union ruled, on July 3, 2012, that it is indeed permissible to resell software licenses even if the digital good has been downloaded directly from the Internet, and that the first sale doctrine applied whenever software was originally sold to a customer for an unlimited amount of time, as such sale involves a transfer of ownership, thus prohibiting any software maker from preventing the resale of their software by any of their legitimate owners. The court requires that the previous owner must no longer be able to use the licensed software after the resale, but finds that the practical difficulties in enforcing this clause should not be an obstacle to authorizing resale, as they are also present for software which can be installed from physical supports, where the first-sale doctrine is in force. The ruling applies to the European Union, but could indirectly find its way to North America; moreover the situation could entice publishers to offer platforms for a secondary market. In a notable case, the High Court of Paris found against Valve for not allowing the resale of games from the Steam digital storefront, requiring Valve to comply with the European Union Directives of first-sale doctrine within three months, pending appeals.

=== Ownership requirement ===
For the first sale doctrine to apply, lawful ownership of the copy or phonorecord is required. As §109(d) prescribes, first sale doctrine does not apply if the possession of the copy is "by rental, lease, loan, or otherwise without acquiring ownership of it".

Some software and digital content publishers claim in their end-user license agreements (EULA) that their software or content is licensed, not sold, and thus the first sale doctrine does not apply to their works. These publishers have had some success in contracting around first sale doctrine through various clickwrap, shrink wrap, and other license agreements. For example, if someone buys MP3 songs from Amazon.com, the MP3 files are merely licensed to them and hence they may not be able to resell those MP3 files. However, MP3 songs bought through iTunes Store may be characterized as "sales" because of Apple's language in its EULA and hence they may be resellable, if other requirements of first sale doctrine are met.

Courts have struggled and taken dramatically different approaches to sort out when only a license was granted to the end user as compared to ownership. Most of these cases involved software-licensing agreements. In general, courts look beneath the surface of the agreements to conclude whether the agreements create a licensing relationship or if they amount to, in substance, sales subject to first sale doctrine under §109(a). Thus, specifying that the agreement grants only a "license" is necessary to create the licensing relationship, but not sufficient. Other terms of the agreement should be consistent with such a licensing relationship.

In Vernor v. Autodesk, Inc. the 9th Circuit created a three-factor test to decide whether a particular software licensing agreement is successful in creating a licensing relationship with the end user. The factors include: 1) whether a copyright holder specifies that a user is granted a license; 2) whether the copyright holder significantly restricts the user's ability to transfer the software to others; and 3) whether the copyright holder imposes notable use restrictions on the software. In Vernor, Autodesk's license agreement specified that it retains title to the software and the user is only granted a non-exclusive license. The agreement also had restrictions against modifying, translating, or reverse-engineering the software, or removing any proprietary marks from the software packaging or documentation. The agreement also specified that software could not be transferred or leased without Autodesk's written consent, and could not be transferred outside the Western Hemisphere. Based on these facts, the 9th Circuit held that the user is only a licensee of Autodesk's software, not an owner and hence the user could not resell the software on eBay without Autodesk's permission.

However, the same 9th Circuit panel that decided Vernor v. Autodesk, refused to apply Vernor's three-factor test in UMG v. Augusto to a purported licensing agreement created when UMG sent unsolicited promotional CDs to music critics. The promotional CDs' packaging contained the language: "This CD is the property of the record company and is licensed to the intended recipient for personal use only. Acceptance of this CD shall constitute an agreement to comply with the terms of the license. Resale or transfer of possession is not allowed and may be punishable under federal and state laws." Augusto tried to sell these CDs on eBay and UMG argued that first sale doctrine did not apply since the CDs were not sold and only a licensing relationship was created. However the court held that first sale doctrine applies when a copy is given away and that recipients of the promotional CDs did not accept the terms of the license agreement by merely not sending back the unsolicited CDs.

In the case UsedSoft v Oracle, the Court of Justice of the European Union ruled that the sale of a software product, either through a physical support or download, constituted a transfer of ownership in EU law, thus the first sale doctrine applies; the ruling thereby breaks the "licensed, not sold" legal theory, but leaves open numerous questions.

=== Importation of copies ===
Section 602(a)(1) of the US copyright statute states that "importation into the United States, without the authority of the owner of copyright under this title, of copies or phonorecords of a work that have been acquired outside the United States is an infringement of the exclusive right to distribute copies or phonorecords." This provision provides the copyright holder an opportunity to stop goods from entering the United States market altogether.

Application of this provision created difficult legal issues in the context of gray market products. Gray market dealers buy the genuine goods in foreign countries at a significant discount from U.S. prices. They then import these genuine goods into the U.S. and sell them at discount prices, undercutting the authorized U.S. dealers. The gray market exists where the price for goods outside the US is lower than the price inside.

On the surface, §602(a), barring unauthorized importation, would seem to clash with the first-sale doctrine, which permits the resale of lawfully made copies. The issue comes down to whether §602(a) creates an affirmative right to bar all unauthorized importation, or does the first-sale doctrine limit the reach of §602(a), thus permitting the resale of at least some lawfully made imported copies.

In 1998, the U.S. Supreme Court in Quality King v. L'Anza found that first-sale doctrine applied to imported goods at least where the imported goods are first lawfully made in the United States, shipped abroad for resale, and later reenter the United States. That case involved importation of hair care products bearing copyrighted labels. A unanimous Supreme Court found that the first-sale doctrine does apply to importation into the US of copyrighted works (the labels), which were made in the US and then exported.

However, the Supreme Court did not decide the issue where gray-market products are initially manufactured abroad and then imported into the US. The Court indicated that importation of goods made outside the US could perhaps be barred under §602(a), since such goods would not be "lawfully made under this title". Such products might be lawfully made, either by the copyright holder or a licensee, but they would not be lawfully made under US copyright law. Rather, they would be lawfully made under the copyright laws of the other country; and the first-sale doctrine would therefore not limit the §602 importation restriction.

The 2008 case Omega v. Costco involved this exact unresolved issue, where the defendant Costco obtained authentic Omega watches, which feature a copyrighted design on the back of the watches, through the gray market and resold them in its stores in the US. Omega manufactured these watches outside the US and did not authorize their importation into the US. Based on the Quality King case, the 9th Circuit held that "application of first-sale doctrine to foreign-made copies would impermissibly apply" the Copyright Act extraterritorially. However, the court stated that first-sale doctrine might still apply to a foreign manufactured copy if it was imported "with the authority of the U.S. copyright holder". The Supreme Court granted certiorari to Omega v. Costco, and affirmed 4–4. However, as an evenly split decision, it set precedent only in the 9th Circuit, not nationwide.

However, in Kirtsaeng v. John Wiley & Sons, Inc., in 2013, the United States Supreme Court held in a 6–3 decision that the first-sale doctrine applies to goods manufactured abroad with the copyright holder's permission and then imported into the US. The case involved a plaintiff who imported Asian editions of textbooks that had been manufactured abroad with the publisher-plaintiff's permission. The defendant, without permission from the publisher, imported the textbooks and resold on eBay. The Supreme Court's holding severely limits the ability of copyright holders to charge vastly different prices in different markets due to ease of arbitrage. The decision removes the incentive to US manufacturers of shifting manufacturing abroad purely in an attempt to circumvent the first-sale doctrine.

== Exceptions ==
=== Record rentals ===
The Record Rental Amendment of 1984, codified in 17 USC §109(b) prohibits an owner of a phonorecord that embodies a sound recording or musical work from renting it to the public for direct or indirect commercial advantage. This exception was designed to prevent music stores from renting records and thereby facilitating home copying.

Section 109(b) is an exception to the first sale doctrine, but it is limited in several ways. It applies only to rentals, and not to resale or other transfers. It is also limited to a subset of sound recordings—only those sound recordings that contain only a musical work. It does not apply to sound recordings that contain other content, such as commentaries or dialog soundtrack, or to non-musical sound recordings, for example audiobooks. Lastly, libraries and educational institutions are exempt from this restriction, and may rent or loan musical sound recordings.

=== Software rentals ===
The Copyright Software Rental Amendments Act of 1990 amended §109(b) further to prohibit rentals of computer software for direct or indirect commercial advantage. The exception does not apply to lending of a copy by a nonprofit library for nonprofit purposes, provided the library affixes an appropriate warning. The amendment also specifically excluded:

- A computer program which is embodied in a machine or product and which cannot be copied during the ordinary operation or use of the machine or product; or
- A computer program embodied in or used in conjunction with a limited purpose computer that is designed for playing video games and may be designed for other purposes.

== Overview of trademark law application ==
With reference to trade in tangible merchandise, such as the retailing of goods bearing a trademark, the first-sale doctrine serves to immunize a reseller from infringement liability.

A guiding principle for determining if a resale is protected by the first sale principle, is any "material differences" between a non-authorized seller and a seller not authorized by the trademark holder.

Such protection to the reseller extends to the point where said goods have not been altered so as to be materially different from those originating from the trademark owner. Alterations or "material differences" don't have to be physical in nature, but may also apply to warranties and service offered by the trademark holder. The holding notion is if any alteration constitutes "material differences" between goods originating from copyright holder and the sold item. Such that the sale "may mislead the consumer and damage the [trademark] owner's goodwill."

=== Lack of comparable quality controls ===
A trademark owner can overcome the first sale doctrine defense if it can show that the unauthorized reseller is using the trademark on goods that lack its quality control standards. Courts have identified a four-prong test that a trademark owner must satisfy:

1. It maintains a substantial set of quality control standards and procedures for its products;
2. It consistently applies these standards and procedures;
3. The reseller is not abiding by these standards; and
4. The sale of products that do not meet the trademark owner's standards is likely to confuse consumers and harm the trademark's value.

== See also ==
- European Union law
  - Copyright law of the European Union
  - Information Society Directive 2001/29/EC, including the right to make a copy for private use
  - Computer Programs Directive 2009/24/EC, including the first-sale doctrine applied to licensed computer software
  - Droit de suite, policy in French and EU law as far as regards copyright on works of art
  - Exhaustion of rights – A concept in EU law similar to the US "First-sale doctrine" as far as regards patents
  - Directive on Copyright in the Digital Single Market
- Copyright infringement
- Digital rights management
- Fair use
- Limitations on exclusive rights: Computer programs
- Vault Corp. v. Quaid Software Ltd., a 1988 case on the extent of software copyright
