= Electronic software licensing =

Articles on electronic software licensing include:

- Software license
- Software license agreement
- Shrink wrap contract
- Clickwrap
