= Nguyen v. Barnes & Noble, Inc. =

2014 American court decision

- Court: United States Court of Appeals for the Ninth Circuit
- Full case name: Kevin Khoa Nguyen, Plaintiff-Appellee, v. Barnes & Noble Inc., Defendant-Appellant
- Argued: May 16 2014
- Decided: Aug 18 2014
- Citation: 763 F.3d 1171

Holding
- Where a website makes its terms of use available via a conspicuous hyperlink of every page of the website but otherwise provides no notice to users nor prompts them to take any affirmative action to demonstrate assent, even close proximity of the hyperlink to relevant buttons users must click on - without more - is insufficient to give rise to constructive notice of an arbitration agreement.

Court membership
- Judges sitting: John T. Noonan and Kim McLane Wardlaw, Circuit Judges, and Roslyn O. Silver, Senior District Judge

Nguyen v. Barnes & Noble, Inc., 763 F.3d 1171 (9th Cir. 2014), was a United States Court of Appeals for the Ninth Circuit decision in which the Court ruled that Barnes & Noble's 2011 Terms of Use agreement, presented in a browsewrap manner via hyperlinks alone, was not enforceable since it failed to offer users reasonable notice of the terms. The decision set an important precedent on the future design and presentation of online contracts for consumer-facing e-commerce sites.

== Background ==
In August 2011, national bookseller Barnes & Noble advertised and held an online "fire sale" of Hewlett-Packard Touchpads. In response, Kevin Khoa Nguyen bought two of the Touchpads on the Barnes & Noble website and received an email confirmation of the purchase. The next day, Nguyen received an email from Barnes & Noble stating his order had been cancelled because of unexpectedly high demand. Nguyen alleged that, as a result of this delayed cancellation, he was unable to obtain the HP tablet he wanted and was forced to purchase a more expensive alternative tablet.

In April 2012, Nguyen filed a class action lawsuit on behalf of himself, and other purchasers whose Touchpad orders had been canceled, in California Superior Court against Barnes & Noble for "deceptive business practices" and "false advertising." Barnes & Noble moved the case to the federal court and motioned to compel arbitration under the Federal Arbitration Act (FAA), alleging that Nguyen was subject to the arbitration agreement in Barnes & Noble's Terms of Use.

The district court denied Barnes & Noble's motion to compel arbitration, and Barnes & Noble subsequently appealed. The Ninth Circuit ultimately affirmed the district court's decision.

== Issue ==
The main issue under consideration for the Court was whether a valid arbitration agreement between Barnes & Noble and Nguyen existed. Barnes & Noble argued that the case should have been settled in arbitration in accordance with the website's terms of use. The terms in this case were presented on the Barnes & Noble website via a "Terms of Use" hyperlink in the bottom left-hand corner of every Barnes & Noble page. The link also appeared in the corner of every page of the Barnes & Noble checkout process via an underlined hyperlink in green font. The full text of the terms found by these links explained that:

"By visiting any area in the Barnes & Noble.com Site, creating an account [or] making a purchase via the Barnes & Noble.com Site... a User is deemed to have accepted the Terms of Use."

— Barnes & Noble's Terms of Use, Nguyen v Barnes & Noble Inc.

Barnes & Noble argued that the location of these hyperlinks sufficiently put Nguyen on notice of the arbitration agreement. That notice, combined with his subsequent use of the website, was enough to bind him to the arbitration agreement. Nguyen conversely argued that he was not given notice nor did he agree to the Terms of Use. He argued that he neither clicked on the "Terms of Use" hyperlink nor read the terms, so he should not have been bound to the agreement.

== Discussion ==
In its analysis of whether the arbitration agreement was valid, the court first differentiated between two contracts commonly formed on the Internet - clickwrap and browsewrap agreements. Clickwrap agreements were formed when users were required to affirmatively click an "I agree" checkbox after being presented with the website's terms. Browsewrap agreements, conversely, required no consent checkbox. Instead, for browsewrap agreements the terms needed only be posted via a hyperlink at the bottom of the page and the user would consent to the agreement by using the website. Following this definition, the court classified the Barnes & Noble terms as a browsewrap agreement.

Looking to previous cases Hines v. Overstock, Fteja v. Facebook, Be In, Inc. v. Google Inc., and Van Tassell v. United Mktg. Grp., LLC, the court explained that the crucial factor in determining whether a browsewrap agreement was valid was whether the user was given actual notice or constructive notice of the website's terms and conditions. In this particular case, however, there was no evidence that Nguyen had knowledge of the agreement. Consequently the validity of the Barnes & Noble browsewrap agreement depended on whether Barnes & Noble put a "reasonably prudent user on inquiry notice of the terms of the contract" as determined by an examination of the "conspicuousness and placement of the Terms of Use hyperlink, other notices given to users of the terms of use, and the website's general design."

In analyzing these measures, the court found that Barnes & Noble hyperlinks were displayed more prominently than in the Specht v. Netscape Communications Corp., where the terms hyperlink was buried at the bottom of the page. A relatively prominent hyperlink alone however, the court stated, was insufficient to give the user notice of the terms. Although a similar case validated hyperlinked browsewrap terms in PDC Labs Inc. v Hack Co, that case differed in that the website also included a screen stating "Review terms." In conclusion, the court decided Barnes & Noble gave insufficient notice of its terms of use to hold Nguyen and its users to the arbitration agreement. Offering perhaps a broader scope of the factors influencing its decision, the court wrote:

"In light of the lack of controlling authority on point, and in keeping with courts' traditional reluctance to enforce browsewrap agreements against individual consumers, we therefore hold that where a website makes its terms of use available via a conspicuous hyperlink of every page of the website but otherwise provides no notice to users nor prompts them to take any affirmative action to demonstrate assent, even close proximity of the hyperlink to relevant buttons users must click on - without more - is insufficient to give rise to constructive notice."

— Nguyen v Barnes & Noble Inc.

The court also rejected Barnes & Noble's argument that Nguyen's familiarity with other websites (including his own) should have led him to constructive notice of Barnes & Noble's terms. The court also refuted Barnes & Noble's argument that the district court inappropriately rejected Barnes & Noble's estoppel argument that Nguyen ratified the terms of use by abiding by its choice of law provision.

== Implications ==
Legal professionals predicted that this decision might impact the future design of terms of use agreements particularly for e-commerce sites, rather than business-to-business sites. The court's decision to include a reference to the "courts' traditional reluctance to enforce browsewrap agreements against individual consumers" indicated that this case would particularly impact consumer-facing businesses. At the time, it led to legal professionals recommending that e-commerce sites consider adding clear manifestations of consent - like checkmarks - or text clearly stating that continued use of the site would be interpreted as the user's consent to the terms.

== See also ==
- Browsewrap
- Specht v. Netscape Communications Corp.
- Ticketmaster v. Tickets.com
- Register.com v. Verio
- In re Zappos.com, Inc., Customer Data Security Breach Litigation
