= Step-Saver Data Systems, Inc. v. Wyse Technology =

- Court: United States Court of Appeals for the Third Circuit
- Full case name: Step-Saver Data Systems, Inc. v. Wyse Technology and The Software Link, Inc.
- Decided: July 29, 1991
- Citation: 939 F.2d 91; 1991 U.S. App. LEXIS 16526; 15 U.C.C. Rep. Serv. 2d (Callaghan) 1

Case history
- Prior actions: 1989 U.S. Dist. LEXIS 11320 (E.D. Pa. Sept. 25, 1989); affirmed in part, reversed in part, 912 F.2d 643 (3rd Cir. 1990); plaintiff's motion for a new trial denied, 752 F. Supp. 181 (E.D. Pa. 1990); dismissed, 1990 U.S. Dist. LEXIS 17381 (E.D. Pa. Dec. 21, 1990)
- Subsequent action: none

Court membership
- Judges sitting: Dolores K. Sloviter (Chief), Robert E. Cowen, John M. Wisdom (U.S. Court of Appeals for the Fifth Circuit, sitting by designation)

Case opinions
- A written license and warranty disclaimer on the box-top of a software package did not become part of a binding contract when the software was purchased. Judgment of U.S. District Court for the Eastern District of Pennsylvania affirmed in part, reversed in part, and remanded.

Step-Saver Data Systems, Inc. v. Wyse Technology was a case in the U.S. Court of Appeals for the Third Circuit primarily concerned with the enforceability of box-top licenses and end user license agreements (EULA) and their place in U.S. contract law. During the relevant period, Step-Saver Data Systems was a value-added reseller, combining hardware and software from different vendors to offer a fully functioning computer system to various end users. Step-Saver's products included software produced by Software Link, Inc (TSL), computer terminals produced by Wyse Technology, and main computers produced by IBM. The fundamental question raised in this case was whether the shrinkwrap licenses accompanying TSL's software were legally binding, given that different terms were negotiated over the phone with Step-Saver prior to receiving physical copies of the software. The case was first heard in the United States District Court for the Eastern District of Pennsylvania, where the court ruled that the shrinkwrap licenses were legally binding. However, the U.S. Court of Appeals for the Third Circuit subsequently reversed this decision, ruling that the shrinkwrap licenses were not legally binding.

== Facts ==
During the relevant period, Step-Saver Data Systems, Inc. was a value-added reseller marketing 'single-user' computer systems (known at the time as micro-computers). These 'single-user' computer systems consolidated software from multiple vendors into a single package tailored to the needs of various end-users.

In an effort to expand their market opportunities, Step-Saver sought to move to multi-user computer systems. To facilitate this transition, Step-Saver purchased a multi-user operating system from The Software Link (TSL) known as "Multi-Link Advanced". They also purchased computer terminals from Wyse Technology that claimed to be compatible with the Multi-Link Advanced operating system. Combining these two components with computers provided by IBM, Step Saver began selling their new multi-user solution. However, soon after Step-Saver began selling this product, complaints were received by customers claiming that the system was not functioning properly. Step-Saver notified both TSL and Wyse of the complaints, but after a large amount of effort the customers' problems remained largely unresolved.

As a result, 12 of Step-Saver's customers filed lawsuits against them. As producers of key components of Step-Saver's overall product, Step-Saver contended that TSL and Wyse were liable in these suits, arguing that the same implied warranties Step-Saver made to its consumers were also made to Step-Saver by TSL and Wyse. However, TSL argued that the box-top license on the software delivered to Step-Saver was the only valid agreement made between the two companies. Step-Saver challenged this argument, indicating that the box-top license should be non-binding since Step-Saver never explicitly agreed to its terms.

== Court opinions ==
Step-Saver initiated this case in an effort to hold Wyse and TSL liable in their customer lawsuits. Step-Saver argued, that any liability that it had to its customers should be shared by both Wyse and TSL since they were the original providers of the allegedly defective software and hardware. Step-Saver also argued that an implied contract existed between Step-Saver and these merchants at the time of purchase. They claimed that such an implied contract required the merchants to become co-defendants in the customer lawsuits.

TSL subsequently argued that the implied contract was not enforceable, but rather, that the Limited Use License Agreement (LULA) written on the software package was. Step-Saver sought a declaratory judgement on the matter and complained that it incurred more than $75,000 in direct damages as a result of the customer lawsuits resulting from the incompatibilities experienced between the terminals bought from Wyse and the software purchased from TSL. Five court cases and three years later the case was finally decided on the July 29th, 1991. All district cases were heard by the United States District Court for the Eastern District of Pennsylvania, and all appeals were heard in the United States Court of Appeals for the Third Circuit . A history and summary of each case is provided in the subsequent sections.

=== District case: Motion for Declaratory Judgment (1989) ===
The plaintiff, Step-Saver, sought contribution and compensation from the defendants, seeking declaratory judgment. In turn, the defendants, Wyse and TSL, moved for summary judgment.

The defendants' motion for summary judgment was subsequently granted, and Step-Saver's motion for a declaratory judgment was denied on the grounds of misuse of the Declaratory Judgment Act. Specifically it failed because of U.S.C. 2201, and a lack of evidence demonstrating that the defendant was liable. The court held that Step-Saver's motion for a declaratory judgment was 'unripe', on the grounds that cases involving customer suits had not yet been decided. The errors in the Step-Saver system that initiated the suits had not been identified and thus could not be designated to be the fault of the hardware or software, in which case TSL and Wyse could be liable.

=== First appeal to Third Circuit (1990) ===
Step-Saver called for a review of the district case, specifically a review of the court's decision to dismiss Step-Saver's complaint for a declaratory judgment. In order to reestablish that Step-Saver's motion could not be affirmed, the court cited Aetna Life Co. v. Haworth, which supported the dismissal of motions for declaratory judgment if the motioning party provided insufficient concrete evidence. In addition, the court indicated that "making a law without finding the necessary facts constitutes advisory opinion writing, and that is constitutionally forbidden"

In this appeal, the court also considered a direct damages claim brought forth by Step-Saver. The claim was defined as independent of declaratory judgment and it was found that the consequential damages could be recovered U.C.C. 2-714(2).

The court affirmed in part and reversed in part. The declaratory judgment motion made by Step-Saver was still considered to be unripe. However, the portion of the claim associated with direct damages was reversed, now in favor of Step-saver. The case was then remanded for further proceedings.

=== District case: Motion for Retrial (1990) ===
Dissatisfied with the verdict of previous proceedings, the plaintiff motioned for a retrial. The defendants had been granted summary judgment on many of the issues presented by Step-Saver. In consideration of a retrial, the court examined the previous court's holdings. The district court found the previous court's holding to be true. Under contract law, ill-defined contracts are treated under U.C.C. 2-207, the previous court decision found that this would render the Step-Saver/TSL implied license as moot and instead the box-top license would be upheld. The court agreed that in the previous proceedings "LULA effectively disclaimed alleged express warranties".

The court found that Step-Saver's allegations of error were unfounded and denied the motion for a new trial.

=== District case: dismissal of vendor suit (1990) ===
Wyse technology and TSL sought to dismiss plaintiff's initial suit seeking compensation or indemnification for damages done to Step-Saver's business due to customer lawsuits.

The court granted this motion on the basis that the first district case associated with Step Saver v. Wyse, was no longer relevant in light of Step-Saver's motion for a second appeal to the 3rd Circuit.

=== Second appeal to Third Circuit (1991) ===
The court reversed holdings of the district court on the grounds that the box-top license is a non-enforceable contract, since Step-Saver did not explicitly agree to its terms. In addition the box-top license itself violated the original contract terms between Step and TSL which had given Step-Saver the right to freely distribute copies of TSL Multi-Link Advanced. The court remanded for further consideration of the Step-Saver initial contract consisting of implied warranty. The court affirmed in all other respects.

== Importance of verdict ==
The enforceability of shrink wrap contracts has been an issue of controversy as demonstrated in a few notable cases, Vernor v. Autodesk and ProCD, Inc. v. Zeidenberg both of which cited the Step-Saver case.

The questions raised about constitutional and statutory preemptions from this case however has been re-argued in other cases such as Softman v. Adobe and Novell, Inc. v. CPU Distrib., Inc. in which the preempted federal statutes have been enforced over the EULA terms, thus invalidating that part of the EULA.

== See also ==
- Vernor v. Autodesk
- ProCD, Inc. v. Zeidenberg
- Softman v. Adobe
- Shrink-wrap license
- Limited Use License Agreement
