= Direct download link =

Type of internet hyperlink

Direct download link (DDL), or simply direct download, is a term used within the Internet-based file sharing community. It is used to describe a hyperlink that points to a location within the Internet where the user can download a file. When used in conversation, DDL distinguishes itself from other forms of peer-to-peer (P2P) downloading architectures in that it uses a client–server architecture, where 100-percent of the file is stored on a single file server or in parallel across multiple file servers in a server farm.

Originally, P2P was used to distribute large sized files without requiring much bandwidth on the part of any one node. However, because of sharing issues, such as the lack of seeding of torrents, throttling of a node's file sharing ports by an Internet service provider, or lawsuits because of uploading copyrighted material, direct download links have become a popular alternative among leechers. There is also an increase in businesses offering gigabytes of free bandwidth and storage space.

== Subverting a site maintainer's policies ==
DDL has also taken on a meaning of providing direct links within a site where the original site's maintainers impede a user from accessing a file directly. Typical impediments include:

- Requiring the user to log in before being provided a link to the content they desire.
- Using ECMAScript or similar programming along with altering the DOM so as to initiate a download instead of clicking or right-clicking directly on a link.
- Downloading a trampoline stub program which, when executed, downloads the complete file.
- Downloading a "download manager" application which then downloads the desired file (which is similar to downloading a stub, but is used for more than one file or package from the same site).

The maintainers of the site may have arguably good reasons for these impediments, such as:

- being able to inform (email) users of available updates so as to reduce the time software is vulnerable
- attempting to bind the user to a legal agreement (license, terms of use, acceptable use policy, etc.) before dispensing the files or software (a form of shrink wrap contract or browse wrap license)
- always downloading the latest version and therefore reducing their software's extant vulnerability
- reducing their Internet bandwidth requirements by only transferring files the user is likely to need

However, many users see this as quite unnecessary, because they generally know what they need and do not want to go through the site's mechanics (such as filling out forms over and over) to get said file. Also, there may be bugs in the site's detection or download methods (or both), thus forcing the user to obtain the file directly. Another example is when the site maintainer tries to identify the user's platform, and the user is simply using something other than the target platform to download the file (for example, using a Microsoft Windows system to download a Linux program, where the same program is built and offered for both platforms).

Therefore, some users may collaborate on sites other than the one offering the desired files, and post URLs which they have identified as being for the desired file. Thus a user wanting the same file does not have to endure the impediments encountered from the original site's maintainers, and simply obtains the file directly.

== See also ==
- File hosting service
- Client–server model
- File sharing
