= Acceptable use policy =

Set of rules of a computer network website

An acceptable use policy (AUP)—also referred to as an acceptable usage policy or, in certain commercial contexts, a fair use policy (FUP)—is a formal set of guidelines established by the administrator, proprietor, or operator of a computer network, website, digital platform, or information system. The policy delineates the conditions under which access is granted and specifies the behaviors that are permitted, restricted, or prohibited. AUPs function as regulatory instruments intended to ensure the responsible use of information and communications technology, to mitigate institutional liability, and to safeguard the rights and security of both users and system owners.

The term "fair use policy," though occasionally employed in industry settings (e.g., by internet service providers to define usage thresholds), is conceptually distinct from fair use as defined in copyright law. The latter constitutes a statutory doctrine governing the lawful reproduction and transformation of protected works; the former reflects privately enforced contractual norms.

AUPs commonly address issues such as unauthorized access, distribution of illicit or harmful content, copyright infringement, violations of information privacy, and misuse of communications infrastructure. They may also outline the procedural and disciplinary consequences of policy violations. In transnational environments, AUPs are increasingly shaped by regional legal frameworks, including data protection regulations (e.g., the General Data Protection Regulation in the European Union) and national cybersecurity standards (e.g., NIST guidelines in the United States).

== Terminology ==
An acceptable use agreement—also referred to in institutional contexts as an access agreement, user agreement, or terms of use—is a policy instrument that codifies the rights, obligations, and restrictions of individuals accessing a designated information system, computer network, or digital resource. These agreements function as governance mechanisms, often embedded within broader contractual or institutional frameworks that regulate digital conduct and access permissions.

While terminology may vary across sectors—such as education, government, commercial enterprise, or public service environments—the core objective remains the same: to formalize user responsibilities and delineate the scope of permitted activity. In educational institutions, for example, access agreements may appear in student handbooks or technology use policies, whereas in commercial settings, they are commonly integrated into end-user license agreements(EULAs) or general terms of service.

The substance of such agreements typically addresses matters such as user authentication, limits on data storage and dissemination, restrictions on the transmission of unlawful or harmful content, and the conditions under which the institution may monitor, restrict, or terminate access. Many agreements also incorporate references to external legal regimes—such as copyright law, data protection, and cybersecurity regulations—that inform both the behavioral norms and potential penalties for violation.

To ensure enforceability and informed consent, acceptable use agreements frequently require explicit user acknowledgment, whether through signed consent forms, clickwrap acceptance during login, or periodic reaffirmation procedures. Critics of current practice have noted, however, that these agreements are often written in legally dense or opaque language, raising concerns about the transparency and actual informedness of user consent.

== Common elements of AUP statements ==
Acceptable use policies (AUPs) typically include a core set of provisions that address legal compliance, user responsibility, and institutional safeguards. According to guidance from the Virginia Department of Education, an effective AUP should align with applicable telecommunications laws and reflect broader regulatory expectations. This includes reference to national legislation such as the Children's Internet Protection Act (CIPA) in the United States, which mandates certain internet safety measures in schools and libraries receiving federal funding.

AUPs also commonly include statements aimed at protecting user privacy and personal safety in digital environments. These provisions encourage secure and ethical behavior, discourage the disclosure of personally identifiable information, and often reference privacy-focused legislation, such as the Family Educational Rights and Privacy Act (FERPA) in the educational context. More generally, these clauses are designed to prevent misuse of institutional systems that could expose individuals to harm or data compromise.

Another essential element is the emphasis on respecting copyright and intellectual property laws. AUPs typically prohibit unauthorized reproduction or distribution of protected materials and may include brief explanations of fair use principles, especially in contexts where users engage with instructional or research-based digital content.

Many policies extend beyond these foundational areas to enumerate specific forms of prohibited conduct. These can include unauthorized access to restricted systems, installation of unapproved software, intentional distribution of malicious code, or the use of institutional platforms for harassment or discriminatory behavior. AUPs often outline institutional rights to monitoring digital activity and enforce penalties for violations, which may range from temporary account suspension to formal disciplinary or legal action. In some cases, policies also reserve the right to revise their terms unilaterally, allowing administrators to update acceptable use conditions without individualized notice to users.

== See also ==
- Fair use – the U.S. copyright doctrine distinct from contractual "fair use policies"
- Terms of service – agreements often incorporating acceptable use language
- End-user license agreement – commercial licensing frameworks relevant to AUPs
- Children's Internet Protection Act – U.S. law that shapes school-based AUPs
- Family Educational Rights and Privacy Act (FERPA) – federal privacy law often cited in educational AUPs
- Computer and network surveillance – institutional enforcement mechanisms tied to AUPs
- Information privacy – a key concern addressed in most AUPs
- Cyberethics – ethical considerations related to digital behavior and policy
- Digital rights – user freedoms and constraints in digital environments
