= Copywrite =

Copywrite may refer to:

- Copywriting, the process of writing the words that promote a person, business, opinion, or idea
- Copywrite (rapper) (born 1978), underground hip-hop artist from Columbus, Ohio
- Copywrite, a disk duplicator from Quaid Software
