= Louisiana Software License Enforcement Act =

The Louisiana Software License Enforcement Act refers to the Software License Enforcement Act (SLEA) adopted by the state of Louisiana. The bill was voted into law in September 1984 under Title 51 (Trade and Commerce) of the Louisiana Revised Statutes by the Louisiana State Legislature. Sponsored and mostly written by Vault Corporation, the SLEA defines the permissible terms and conditions of a software license agreement and the requirements for enforceability. The reverse engineering, decompiling or disassembling provision of the Louisiana SLEA was invalidated by the United States Court of Appeals for the Fifth Circuit ruling in Vault Corp. v. Quaid Software, Ltd., 847 F.2d 255 (5th Cir. 1988).

== Summary of act ==
The Louisiana SLEA consists of sections 1961-1966 of Title 51 of the Louisiana Revised Statutes, which outlines and specifies: relevant definitions, requirements for enforceability, accepted licensing terms, proper display of licensing terms, and enforceability. Under section 1963, a software license agreement can only be enforced if the following conditions are met:

- The end user can clearly read a software license notice on the software packaging.
- The software license notice indicates that by opening the package or using the software the end user accepts the terms of the enclosed license agreement.
- The notice states that the software may be returned if the end user does not accept the license agreement.

Under section 1964, the terms of a software license agreement can enable the licensor to retain ownership of a licensed software copy. If retained, the agreement may also include the following limitations of the end user's ability:

- To reproduce/replicate the licensed software copy.
- To modify, adapt, translate, reverse engineer, decompile, disassemble, and/or develop derivative works of the licensed software copy.
- To further transfer, assign, rent, sell, or otherwise dispose of a licensed software copy.

In addition, the licensor may automatically terminate the software license agreement without notice if any provision of the agreement was breached by the licensee.

== Road to becoming law ==
The Louisiana SLEA was first announced at Softcon in New Orleans by Louisiana Secretary of State James H. Brown during a press conference sponsored by Vault Corporation.

This bill is intended to strengthen significantly the ability of software publishers and distributors to enforce their rights under trade secret and copyright laws. This bill strikes a balance between the legitimate interests of the software industry in preventing piracy and the legitimate interests of the customers who acquire copies of software pursuant to license agreements.

— Louisiana Secretary of State James H. Brown

Vault Corporation's, a company that developed software protection systems (anti-piracy tools), Chairman Krag Brotby was attributed to saying, "[Vault] helped write most of the bill...and that the announcement was timed to coincide with Softcon coming to New Orleans." Brotby predicted that the law would provide a model for the other 49 states; Vault Corp. had invested $50,000 in an effort to push the bill.

The SLEA was introduced to the Louisiana State Legislature by State Senator William Atkins and Representative Al Ater. Supporters of the bill hoped it would encourage the growth of the software industry in Louisiana. It passed with minimal opposition in September 1984. Louisiana was the first state to adopt the SLEA, and the only state to adopt the bill as written by Vault Corporation. The bill was criticized for being, "a special-interest legislation designed to improve the economic position of software manufacturers without doing anything of substance to challenge software piracy," Jay BloomBecker.

== Role in Vault Corp. v. Quaid Software Ltd. ==
The Louisiana SLEA was first examined in court when Vault Corporation sued Quaid Software Ltd. for copyright infringement, trade secret misappropriation, and patent infringement. Vault argued that Quaid's actions in decompiling and disassembling PROLOK constituted a violation of the software license agreement. Therefore, by Louisiana's Software License Enforce Act, Quaid would be in violation of the Louisiana Uniform Trade Secret Act for trade secret misappropriation.

In Vault Corp. v. Quaid Software Ltd., 655 F.Supp. 750 (US District Court, E.D. Louisiana 1987), the United States District Court for the Eastern District of Louisiana ruled that the SLEA was preempted by the Copyright Act, because, "Louisiana's License Act 'touched upon the area' of federal copyright law." Upon appeal, the United States Court of Appeals for the Fifth Circuit affirmed the district court's ruling. Thus, the Louisiana Revised Statutes 51:1963:4 provision for reverse engineering, decompiling, or disassembling, was invalidated.
