= Facebook privacy and copyright hoaxes =

The Facebook privacy and copyright hoaxes are a collection of internet hoaxes claiming that posting a status on Facebook constitutes a legal notice protecting one's posts from copyright infringement or providing privacy protection to one's profile information and posted content. The hoax takes the form of a Facebook status that urges others to post the same or a similar status.

The hoax first became popular in May and June 2012. It has since re-appeared multiple times, including in November 2012 and again in January and September 2015. A number of high-profile individuals such as Rick Perry have fallen victim to the hoax.

The hoaxes are based on several false assumptions, including that Facebook becoming a public company in May 2012 affects how it treats user information, that posting certain content online can protect someone from adverse legal consequences, and that Facebook can significantly change its terms of service agreement without providing notification of those changes.
