= End-user license agreement =

Software license agreements

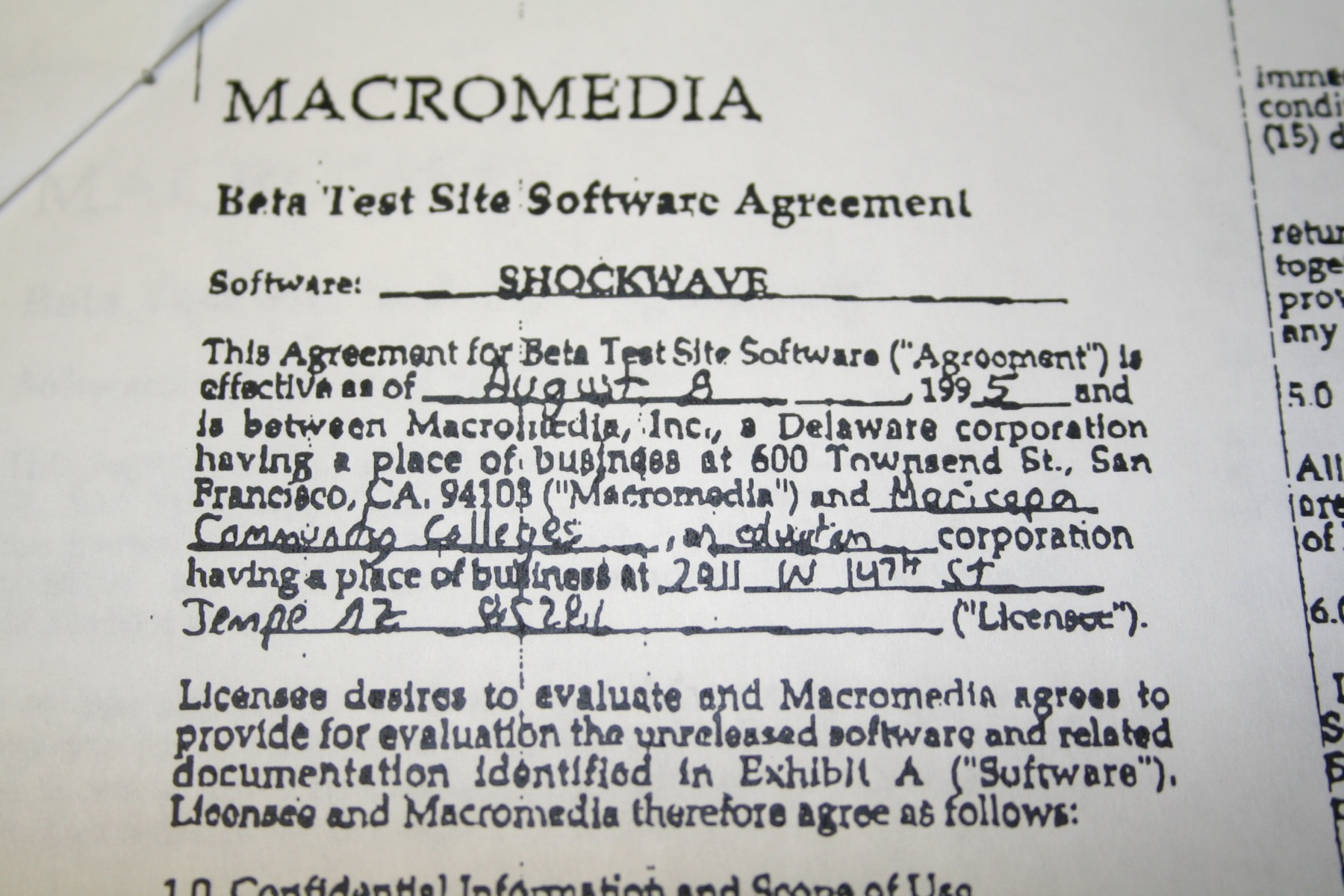
A brief, written-out beta test software license issued by Macromedia in 1995

An end-user license agreement or EULA (/ˈjuːlə/) is a legal contract between a software supplier and a customer or end-user.

The practice of selling licenses rather than copies of software predates the recognition of software copyright, which has been recognized since the 1970s in the United States. Initially, EULAs were often printed as shrink wrap contracts, where tearing the shrink wrap indicated acceptance. Software distributed via the internet is more commonly licensed via clickwrap (where the user clicks to agree to the license) or browsewrap (continuing to browse the website indicates agreement).

Most companies prefer to sell licenses rather than copies of the software because it enables them to enforce stricter terms on the end user in a number of domains, especially by prohibiting transfer of ownership or use on multiple computers, and by asserting ownership of the copyright of derivative works, such as user-generated content in video games.

Enforceability of EULAs has been a controversial issue and varies by jurisdiction. In the United States, it is possible to enforce a EULA that is shown to the customer after purchase, but this is not the case in Germany. European Union law only allows for enforcement of EULAs insofar as they do not breach reasonable customer expectations.

== Software copyright ==
The source code (or compiled binaries in the form of object code) of a computer program is protected by copyright law that vests the owner with the exclusive right to copy the code. The underlying ideas or algorithms are not protected by copyright law, but are often treated as a trade secret and concealed by such methods as non-disclosure agreements. Software copyright has been recognized since the mid-1970s and is vested in the company that makes the software, not the employees or contractors who wrote it.

The tendency to license proprietary software—to sell the right of use of the software rather than a copy of the software—dates from the time period before the existence, then the scope of software copyright protection was clear. These licenses have continued in use after software copyright was recognized in the courts, and are considered to grant the company extra protection compared to copyright law. Virtually all proprietary software is not sold as a copy but rather as a license with associated EULA.

== Delivery of EULAs ==
Initially, end-user license agreement (EULAs) were printed on either the shrinkwrap packaging encasing the product (shrink wrap contract) or a piece of paper. The license often stipulated that a customer agreed if they did not return the product within a specified interval. After the advent of the internet, EULAs are more often found in clickwrap format where the user only needs to click an agree button. Without the constraints of having to print the license, the length of the agreements ballooned. Another type of license, browsewrap, intuits the user's consent after they simply visit a website and are made aware of the terms of use.

EULAs are often written in vague language, and do not inform the customer of the limitations on the agreement's enforceability. Most EULAs have been designed so that it is very difficult to read and understand them, but easy to agree to the licensing terms without reading them. Regardless of how easy it is to access, very few consumers read any part of the license agreement. Most assume the terms are unobjectionable or barely notice agreeing while installing the software. Companies take advantage of consumers' inattention to insert provisions into EULAs. Many assert that the purchaser is an adult and takes responsibility for minors' use of the product, to relieve the vendor of the issue of contracting with a minor and liability from minors' use of the product.

EULAs, almost always offered on a take-it-or-leave-it basis as a non-negotiable condition for using the software, are very far from the prototypical contract where both parties fully understand the terms and agree of their own free will. Proponents argue that the contracts streamline purchases and that savings for the company could be passed to the consumer. Enterprises buying software for a large number of employees often negotiate the licensing agreement with the vendor.

== Common provisions ==
According to one study, economic competition from different software services leads to EULAs more favorable to the customer.

=== Resale ===
According to United States federal law, a company can restrict the parties to which it sells but it cannot prevent a buyer from reselling the product. Software licensing agreements usually prohibit resale, enabling the company to maximize revenue. Proprietary software is usually offered under a restrictive license that bans copying and reuse and often limits the purchaser to using the software on one computer. Source code is rarely available. Derivative software works and reverse engineering are usually explicitly prohibited. The issue of reuse is particularly important in the copyright law of English-speaking countries.

=== Data collection ===
Many EULAs allow the vendor to collect information about the user and use it in unrestricted ways.

=== Derivative works ===
Some EULAs restrict the ability of users to exercise copyright over derivative work made using the software, such as creative creations in the virtual worlds of video games. Although most video game EULAs assert that the developer holds the copyright on any user-generated content, this is contested by users and has not been tested in the court system. Legal scholar Anthony Michael Catton suggests that user-generated content should be considered jointly authored by the video game developers and the users.

Some companies do allow video footage of their games to be distributed online, even for profit.

=== License term ===
Traditionally, software was distributed in the form of binary object code that could not be understood or modified by the user, but could be downloaded and run. The user bought a perpetual license to use a particular version of the software. Software as service (SaaS) vendors—who have the majority market share in application software as of 2023—rarely offer perpetual licenses. SaaS licenses are usually temporary and charged on a pay-per-usage or subscription basis, although other revenue models such as freemium are also used. Even if the user purchases a perpetual license, it is common for EULAs to allow unilateral termination by the vendor for any number of vague reasons or none at all. Furthermore, many EULAs allow the vendor to change the terms at any time and the customer must choose between agreeing or ceasing use of the product, without getting a refund. EULAs are also applicable to in-app purchases and microtransactions. As a result, players could lose access to purchased content if the vendor decides to terminate their license and withdraw the content.

=== Product liability ===
Most EULAs disclaim any liability for harms caused by the product, and prevent the purchaser from accessing the court system to seek a remedy.

== Enforceability ==
There has been substantial debate on to what extent EULAs can be considered binding. Many EULAs contain stipulations that are illegal and therefore unenforceable. Software vendors keep these unenforceable provisions in the agreements, perhaps because users rarely resort to the legal system to challenge them.

=== European Union ===
Under the New Digital Content Directive effective since 2022 in the European Union, EULAs are only enforceable to the extent that they do not breach reasonable consumer expectations. The gap between expectations and the content of EULAs is especially wide when it comes to restrictions on copying and transferring ownership of digital content. In Germany, EULAs are only valid if known to the customer before purchase.

=== United Kingdom ===
The United Kingdom's National Consumer Council undertook a study published in 2008 which found issues with the way 17 major IT businesses had been using EULA's and asked the Office of Fair Trading to undertake an investigation. As of 2020, the enforceability of EULAs and provisions granting copyright of all derivative works to the developer has not been judicially tested in United Kingdom.

=== United States ===
Before the 1996 ProCD, Inc. v. Zeidenberg in the United States, shrinkwrap licenses were not held to be binding, but since then they often have been. In some shrinkwrap cases the customer was found not to have consented to the EULA and was therefore not bound by it. Clickwrap has been found generally to be enforceable—even when the license terms are provided after the sale. The enforceability of browsewrap is lower, but has been enforced in some cases where it can be proven that the user was presented with the terms of use and continued to use the website.

== Translations ==
EULAs are primarily legal documents with IT terminology. As such, knowledge in several different domains may be necessary to produce a satisfactory translation.

== Humor ==
There have been numerous attempts to make fun of EULAs not being read. Some EULAs bury a contract offering payment to a reader who notices the clause. As an April Fool's Day joke, Gamestation added a clause stating that users who placed an order on April 1, 2010, agreed to irrevocably give their soul to the company, which 7,500 users agreed to. Although there was a checkbox to exempt out of the "immortal soul" clause, few users checked it and thus Gamestation concluded that 88% of their users did not read the agreement. During the installation of version 4 of the Advanced Query Tool the installer measured the elapsed time between the appearance and the acceptance of the end-user license agreements to calculate the average reading speed. If the agreements were accepted fast enough, a popup congratulated the users for reading several hundred words per second. South Park parodied this in the episode "HumancentiPad", where Kyle had neglected to read the terms of service for his last iTunes update and therefore inadvertently agreed to have Apple employees experiment upon him. Business Insider joked about EULAs that include a stipulation to not use digital audio workstation software in the development of missiles or nuclear weapons.

== Sources ==
- Ahuja, Neha (2016). "Commercial Creations: The Role of End User License Agreements in Controlling the Exploitation of User Generated Content". John Marshall Review of Intellectual Property Law. 16: 381–410.
- Anesa, Patrizia (1 March 2014). "Translating end-user license agreements: issues, strategies and techniques". ASp. La revue du GERAS. 65 (65): 87–102. doi:10.4000/asp.4205. ISSN 1246-8185.
- Aroni, Gabriele (2023). "Games as Authorial Platforms? An Exploration of the Legal Status of User-Created Content from Digital Games" (PDF). International Journal for the Semiotics of Law. 36 (5): 2021–2036. doi:10.1007/s11196-023-09976-z.
- Bakos, Yannis; Marotta-Wurgler, Florencia; Trossen, David R. (2014). "Does Anyone Read the Fine Print? Consumer Attention to Standard-Form Contracts". The Journal of Legal Studies. 43 (1): 1–35. doi:10.1086/674424.
- Ben-Shahar, Omri; Schneider, Carl E. (2014). More Than You Wanted to Know: The Failure of Mandated Disclosure. Princeton University Press. ISBN 978-0-691-16170-9.
- Bonar-Bridges, James (2016). "Regulating Virtual Property with EULAS". Wisconsin Law Review Forward. 2016: 79.
- Boyle, James (2003). "The Second Enclosure Movement and the Construction of the Public Domain". Law and Contemporary Problems. 66 (1): 33–74. ISSN 0023-9186.
- Carpenter, Owen (2023). "EULA, or Eulogy? Reckoning End User License Agreements and Near-Future Cyborgs". Health Matrix: Journal of Law-Medicine. 33: 467–498.
- Catton, Anthony Michael (2020-09-01). "What is mine in Minecraft? Assessing the copyright and ownership of in-game player creations (Part 2)". Interactive Entertainment Law Review. 3 (1). Edward Elgar Publishing: 21–31. doi:10.4337/ielr.2020.01.02. ISSN 2515-3870.
- Clohessy, Trevor; Acton, Thomas; Morgan, Lorraine (2020). "The SaaS Payoff: Measuring the Business Value of Provisioning Software-as-a-Service Technologies". Measuring the Business Value of Cloud Computing. Springer International Publishing. pp. 39–55. ISBN 978-3-030-43198-3.
- Corbett, Susan (2019). "Computer game licences: The EULA and its discontents". Computer Law & Security Review. 35 (4): 453–461. doi:10.1016/j.clsr.2019.03.007. ISSN 0267-3649.
- Dempsey, David; Kelliher, Felicity (2018). Industry Trends in Cloud Computing: Alternative Business-to-Business Revenue Models. Springer International Publishing. ISBN 978-3-319-87693-1.
- Eichstädt, Timm; Spieker, Stefan (2024). 52 Stunden Informatik: Was jeder über Informatik wissen sollte (in German). Springer Fachmedien. ISBN 978-3-658-41838-0.
- Kim, Nancy S. (2016). "Wrap contracting and the online environment: Causes and cures". Research Handbook on Electronic Commerce Law. Edward Elgar Publishing. ISBN 978-1-78347-992-4.
- King, Chelsea (2016). "Forcing Players to Walk the Plank: Why End User Licences Agreements Improperly Control Players' Rights regarding Microtransactions in Video Games". William & Mary Law Review. 58: 1365.
- Mezei, Peter; Harkai, Istvan (2022). "Self-Regulating Platforms?: The Analysis of the Enforcement of End-User Rights in the Light of the Transposition of Article 17 of the CDSM Directive" (PDF). Public Governance, Administration and Finances Law Review. 7: 109. doi:10.53116/pgaflr.2022.1.8.
- Morin, Andrew; Urban, Jennifer; Sliz, Piotr (2012). "A Quick Guide to Software Licensing for the Scientist-Programmer". PLOS Computational Biology. 8 (7) e1002598. Bibcode:2012PLSCB...8E2598M. doi:10.1371/journal.pcbi.1002598. ISSN 1553-7358. PMC 3406002. PMID 22844236. This article incorporates text available under the CC BY 4.0 license.
- Oprysk, Liliia; Sein, Karin (June 2020). "Limitations in End-User Licensing Agreements: Is There a Lack of Conformity Under the New Digital Content Directive?". IIC - International Review of Intellectual Property and Competition Law. 51 (5): 594–623. doi:10.1007/s40319-020-00941-y.
- O'Regan, Gerard (2022). Concise Guide to Software Engineering: From Fundamentals to Application Methods. Springer Nature. ISBN 978-3-031-07816-3.
- Terasaki, Michael (2013). "Do End User License Agreements Bind Normal People". Western State University Law Review. 41: 467.
- Watt, Andy (2023). Building Modern SaaS Applications with C# And . NET: Build, Deploy, and Maintain Professional SaaS Applications. Packt. ISBN 978-1-80461-087-9.
