= Shrinkwrap (contract law) =

Contracts packaged with products

Shrinkwrap contracts or shrinkwrap licenses are boilerplate contracts packaged with products; use of the product is deemed acceptance of the contract.

Web-wrap, click-wrap and browse-wrap are related terms which refer to license agreements in software which is downloaded or used over the internet.

A software license agreement is commonly called an end user license agreement (or EULA).

The term "shrink wrap" describes the shrink wrap plastic wrapping which coats software boxes or the terms and conditions which comes with products on delivery.

Shrink wrap assertions are unsigned permit understandings which state that acknowledgement on the client of the terms of the assertion is demonstrated by opening the shrink wrap bundling or other bundling of the product, by utilisation of the product, or by some other determined instrument.

== United States ==
The legal status of shrink wrap contracts in the US is somewhat unclear. In the 1980s, software license enforcement acts were enacted by Louisiana and Illinois in an attempt to address this issue, but parts of the Louisiana act were invalidated in Vault Corp. v. Quaid Software Ltd., and the Illinois act was quickly repealed. Case history also fails to clear up the confusion. One line of cases follows ProCD v. Zeidenberg which held such contracts enforceable (see, e.g., Bowers v. Baystate Technologies) and the other follows Klocek v. Gateway, Inc., which found the contracts at hand unenforceable (e.g., Specht v. Netscape Communications Corp.), but did not comment on shrink wrap contracts as a whole. These decisions are split on the question of consent, with the former holding that only objective manifestation of consent is required while the latter require at least the possibility of subjective consent. In particular, the Netscape contract was rejected because it lacked an express indication of consent (no "I agree" button) and because the contract was not presented directly to the user (users were required to click on a link to access the terms). However, the court in this case did make it clear that "Reasonably conspicuous notice of the existence of contract terms and unambiguous manifestation of assent to those terms by consumers are essential if electronic bargaining is to have integrity and credibility."

== See also ==
- Data General Corp. v. Digital Computer Controls, Inc.
- SoftMan Products Co. v. Adobe Systems Inc.
- Vernor v. Autodesk, Inc.
- Contract of adhesion, another name for a "take it or leave it" contract
