= Register.com v. Verio =

American legal case

- Court: United States Court of Appeals for the Second Circuit
- Full case name: Register.com, Inc. v. Verio, Inc.
- Argued: January 21, 2001
- Decided: January 23, 2004
- Citation: 356 F.3d 393 (2d Cir. 2004)

Case history
- Prior history: 126 F.Supp.2d 238 (S.D.N.Y. 2000)

Court membership
- Judges sitting: Pierre N. Leval, John F. Keenan (S.D.N.Y.)

Case opinions
- Majority: Leval, joined by Keenan

Register.com v. Verio, 356 F.3d 393 (2d Cir. 2004), was a decision of the United States Court of Appeals for the Second Circuit that addressed several issues relevant to Internet law, such as browse wrap licensing, trespass to servers, and enforcement of the policies of the Internet Corporation for Assigned Names and Numbers (ICANN). The decision upheld the ruling of a lower court which prevented a provider of web development services from automatically harvesting publicly available registration data from a domain name registrar's servers for advertising purposes.

== Background ==
=== Register.com ===
Register.com is a World Wide Web domain name registrar, appointed by ICANN (Internet Corporation for Assigned Names and Numbers). All registrars must abide by ICANN's Registrar Accreditation Agreement. This agreement included several clauses that were important in this case.

==== The ICANN Registrar Accreditation Agreement ====
First, the Agreement includes a requirement that:

"At its expense, Registrar shall provide an interactive web page and a port 43 Whois service providing free public query-based access to up-to-date (i.e. updated at least daily) data concerning all active SLD (second-level domain) registrations sponsored by Registrar in the registry for the .com, .net, and .org TLDs (top-level domains)."

Data that is typically listed in a Whois service includes name, address phone number and email address.

The Agreement also includes the following clause:

"Registrar shall not impose terms and conditions on use of the data provided except as permitted by an ICANN-adopted policy… Registrar shall permit use of data it provides in response to queries for any lawful purposes except to: (a) allow, enable, or otherwise support the transmission of mass unsolicited, commercial advertising or solicitations via e-mail (spam)…"

Finally, the Agreement also included the following clause: "No Third-Party Beneficiaries. This Agreement shall not be construed to create any obligation by either ICANN or Registrar to any non-party to this Agreement, including any SLD holder."

==== Register.com's Terms of Use ====
Register.com followed the rules of the Agreement and set up a WHOIS lookup service. It affixed the following statement to each set of data it returned: "By submitting a WHOIS query, you agree that you will use this data only for lawful purposes and that under no circumstances will you use this data to…support the transmission of mass unsolicited, commercial advertising or solicitation via email."

In addition to domain name registration, Register.com also provides web development services. It only solicited its registration customers with its services if they opted to receive such solicitation.

=== Verio, Inc. ===
Verio is a provider of website development services such as web site design and operation. It developed automated software that submitted port 43 WHOIS queries to various registrars on a daily basis. Verio used this data to contact recent registrants and advertise its services to them. These messages included references to Register.com, which led many consumers to believe the advertisements were actually from Register.com, including those who had opted not to receive solicitations.

Register.com began to receive complaints from its customers regarding the advertisements. Register.com in turn complained to Verio, saying that the confusion was tarnishing its image with its customers. Verio continued to solicit the customers but stopped using Register's name in the messages. Register reacted by changing the statement affixed to the WHOIS data to prohibit the use of the data for solicitation by direct mail, email, or phone.

This new statement was in violation of the ICANN Agreement, which stated that the data should be allowed for all legal purposes except for email spam. Under the ICANN Agreement, Register.com was not allowed to prohibit direct mail or phone solicitations. Verio discontinued its email solicitations, but continued to contact Register's customers via direct mail and phone.

=== Case ===
Register.com filed suit on August 3, 2000 requesting a restraining order against Verio. It claimed that Verio was infringing its trademark by including its name in solicitations. With regard to the WHOIS queries, Register.com claimed Verio, was accessing its servers without authorization, which, it alleged, was a violation of the Computer Fraud and Abuse Act. Register.com also claimed that Verio was committing trespass to chattels, because the automated requests could be harmful to Register.com's servers.

== Decision ==
=== Enforcement of the ICANN Agreement ===
Verio argued that Register was not allowed to forbid the use of the WHOIS data for direct mail or phone solicitation because the ICANN Agreement specifically said the data must be available for any lawful purpose other than email spam. However, Register countered that argument by stating that the Agreement was between Register and ICANN, and Verio had no right to enforce it. Furthermore, the Agreement specifically stated that it created no obligations to third parties.

In an amicus brief (a brief by a non-party offering to the court additional points of view), ICANN itself weighed in on the case and advocated strongly for Register. It pointed to the dispute resolution processes it had in place for similar cases of which Verio refused to make use. It also stressed that the "no third party" clause was an essential part of its policies. Finally, ICANN pointed out that decisions about ICANN policies were best resolved by them, rather than a court that is not familiar with the technical issues.

The court agreed with ICANN's and Register's arguments. Because of the "no third party" clause, the Agreement could not be enforced by Verio. Furthermore, the court agreed that technical issues can change quickly and are therefore best resolved by ICANN, which is why they included the "no third party" clause in the Agreement.

=== Browsewrap License ===
Verio argued that the terms of use were not enforceable because the contract terms regarding the permissible uses of the data did not appear until after the transaction was completed. Verio relied on two previous Internet "browse wrap" cases as precedent. In Specht v. Netscape Communications Corp., the court refused to enforce a click-through license because a contract requires that both parties agree to the terms and the website did not ensure that the users had read and agreed to the terms. In Ticketmaster Corp. v. Tickets.com, Inc., the court held that a contract was unenforceable because the website did not have a check box to signify that the user specifically agreed to the terms.

The court rejected Verio's arguments regarding the timing of the statement. It stated that although the terms may not have been enforceable on the first query, Verio would have been aware of the terms before making all subsequent queries and the terms were therefore enforceable. The Netscape case was distinguishable because in that case the users only engaged in the transaction once and therefore never received proper notice of the terms. Verio was made aware of the terms with each query, albeit it at the end of each one. The court also gave little weight to the Ticketmaster case because that case only involved a preliminary injunction. The court went even further, stating that it did not agree with the Ticketmaster outcome. The court argued that a check box was not necessary because the Restatement of Contracts says that even silence can be considered assent to a contract as long as the user knows about the terms, has an opportunity to refuse the service, and still took the benefit of the service.

=== Trespass to Chattels ===
Trespass to chattels is a tort in which one interferes with someone's personal property in a way that would cause harm. Register invoked this law, claiming that Verio's automated queries were harming its computers. Verio claimed that Register had not shown evidence of any damage or that the access was unauthorized. The Court of Appeals relied on the findings of the lower court in the matter of harm. The District Court had determined that the automated queries would inevitably lead to other companies doing the same, and hence cause Register's systems to crash. As for the authorization, the court ruled that Register's complaints to Verio were enough to serve as notice to Verio that its access was not authorized.

=== Trademark Infringement ===
Trademark infringement cases require evidence of consumer confusion. The court ruled in favor of Register here as there was direct evidence that consumers had been confused by the emails that made reference to their recent transaction with Register.com. Furthermore, the court ruled that the script of the telemarketing calls was also misleading.

This finding under s 43(a) of the Lanham Act was subsequently reversed and removed from the injunction sought by Register.com. It was stated that "because Verio's telemarketing script did not contain a misleading description or representation of fact, that constituted actionable conduct under the Lanham Act, and because Register.com did not demonstrate a likelihood of success on the merits of this claim," the court had no option but to remove this from the injunction.

== Similar cases ==
- eBay v. Bidder's Edge, 100 F.Supp.2d 1058 (N.D. Cal. 2000).
- Specht v. Netscape Communications Corp., 150 F.Supp.2d 585 (S.D.N.Y. 2001).
- Ticketmaster Corp. v. Tickets.com, Inc., CV99-7654-HLH(VBKx), 2003 U.S. Dist. Lexis 6483, 2003 WL 21406289 (C.D. Cal. Mar. 7, 2003).
- Intel Corp. v. Hamidi, 30 Cal.4th 1342 (2003).
