= Suika Game =

2021 Japanese puzzle game

- Official artwork for the game, showcasing every fruit, except the pear
- Developer: Aladdin X (Note: Aladdin X was initially known as popIn and is a subsidiary of Baidu. popIn is now its own branch of Aladdin X.) (Note: Additional porting development done by Esquadra Inc.)
- Publisher: Aladdin X
- Engine: Unity
- Platforms: Android, iOS, Nintendo Switch, Windows, popIn Aladdin
- Release: popIn Aladdin: JP: April 2021; Nintendo Switch: JP: December 9, 2021; WW: October 20, 2023; iOS: JP: January 1, 2024; WW: March 7, 2024; Android: WW: April 11, 2024; Windows: WW: July 26, 2026
- Genre: Puzzle
- Modes: Single-player; Multiplayer

Suika Game (Note: Japanese: スイカゲーム, Hepburn: Suika Gēmu) (also called Watermelon Game, suika is rōmaji for watermelon, or simply Suika) is a Japanese puzzle video game by Aladdin X, which combines the elements of falling and merging puzzle games. The game was originally developed for the company's digital projectors in April 2021 and due to its initial success, released on the Nintendo eShop in December 2021 in Japan. After gaining popularity, it was made available globally in October 2023. The concept originates from a Chinese browser game titled Merge Big Watermelon that was released in January 2021.

The game involves the player trying to build a high score by dropping fruits into a container without having them overflow out of the container. To earn points the player must combine two of the same fruits, which creates a new fruit in the game's fruit cycle. The game allows players to view other players' ranks through an online leaderboard.

During 2023 Suika Game gained popularity after being played by live streamers, particularly VTubers. The game was received well by critics, praising the simplicity and charm of the game. It achieved over four million downloads by November 2023 and became the most downloaded eShop game on the Nintendo Switch in both 2023 and 2024 in Japan. The game also became prone to unofficial versions being created. Paid DLC was released in February 2024, which added local competitive multiplayer and online functionality was added in May 2024. As of October 2024, the game has achieved over 11 million downloads.

A sequel called Suika Game Planet was announced in September 2025 and released in Japan on December 18, 2025, and in the United States on January 5, 2026.

== Gameplay ==
A view of the container filled with fruit. Featured in the container are the first six fruits in the Circle of Evolution, as well as the titular watermelon.

Suika Game is a puzzle game focusing on stacking objects in a confined space, reminiscent of Tetris. The player, represented as a cloud called Poppy, is tasked with dropping a wide range of fruits in a box, aiming for the highest score without having a single fruit cross the line at the top of the box and overflowing out, or else the game would end. In order to keep the fruits from overflowing out of the box, the player must match two types of fruits in order for them to merge into the next biggest fruit in the cycle, increasing the player's score. The bigger the fruits that merge the larger the point bonus is, with the largest merger the player can achieve resulting in the titular watermelon. If two watermelons merge, they poof from the box. Suika Game has no time limit to rush the player with; unlike in games such as Tetris, the fruits are affected by physics causing them to hit off each other and roll away from where they were initially dropped. Sometimes the pressure released by two fruits merging is enough to send a fruit out of the box and end the game.

There are 11 fruits in the game and they go in a cycle from smallest to largest: the cherry, (Note: The cherry is the only fruit in Suika Game that cannot be made.) the strawberry, the grapes, the dekopon, the persimmon, (Note: It is commonly mistaken that the fruit is an orange instead.) the apple, the pear, the peach, the pineapple, the melon, and the titular watermelon. However, the fruits that the player can drop into the box are limited to the five smallest in the cycle. The order the player can drop the fruit is completely random, but they can see the fruit that is coming up one turn ahead. For the Chinese "Merge Big Watermelon" browser game version, the order of the fruit is slightly different as the game features different fruits such as kiwis, lemons and tangerines in its cycle.

Suika Game also features an online leader board to compare other players' ranks online, being split between scores from "daily", "monthly" and "overall". This leader board can keep track of the player's own score too. This ability to share and compare points leads both players and livestreamers to create an unofficial challenge that requires them to reach at least 3,000 points in-game.

On February 21, 2024, paid DLC introduced local competitive multiplayer modes. Aside from Original, it introduced Time Limit and Attack multiplayer modes. Online multiplayer was released as an update on May 23, 2024.

== Development and release ==
Suika Game was initially developed as a built-in application for the popIn Aladdin, a 3-in-1 ceiling digital projector developed by a branch of Aladdin X called popIn, in April 2021. It was said to be well received amongst customers of the projector. Aladdin X decided that due to the game's popularity on the projector, as well as wanting to spread awareness of their projectors further, they would rework the framework of Suika Game to bring it to the Nintendo eShop on December 9, 2021. Aladdin X have stated there are minor differences between the Nintendo Switch and popIn Aladdin versions of the game, mainly pointing to the weight of the fruits and how points are calculated. During an interview with Nippon TV Aladdin X mentioned the idea of bringing the game to smartphones, however decided against it at the time due wanting the game to have "a better chance of standing out" amongst other apps on the market.

The initial concept for this game originates from a Chinese web browser game developed by marketing company Meadow Science (Chinese: 米兜科技) called "Merge Big Watermelon" (Chinese: 合成大西瓜). The game released in January 2021 and became a large success, with Merge Big Watermelon receiving more than 1.4 billion related search hits on Sina Weibo.

The game received little attention after the game's launch onto the eShop until September 2023; in which the game garnered an increase in popularity, with GamesRadar+ comparing the sudden popularity to Among Us in 2020. Cited as one of the main causes of the game going viral was due to coverage by Japanese live streamers streaming the game starting in May 2023, with 2.84 million hours watched monthly and ranking 82nd most watched game on Twitch in September 2023. VTubers were particularly noted for the game's success, with members of VTuber agencies such as Inugami Korone from Hololive Production cited as bringing millions of viewers to the game. In the west, livestreamers CDawgVA, LilyPichu, Ludwig and QTCinderella were credited to have also helped increase the game's popularity outside of Japan. Additionally, Aladdin X believes the success and popularity of the game derives from the game's "cute and friendly art that appeals to a wide audience", as well as the game's simplistic rules. To celebrate the game reaching 4 million downloads in November 2023, Aladdin X created animated stickers for the Japanese social media software Line.

Due to the game's popularity English-speaking news publications, such as Polygon, published articles on how to obtain the game using a Japanese Nintendo Account. On October 20, 2023, Suika Game was released globally onto the eShop unannounced, however the game was initially untranslated from Japanese. English-language support was later added in an update released on October 24, 2023. Alongside the translation, the game was given a Halloween theme which changed the game's visuals, such as turning the watermelons into pumpkins, as well as adding Halloween music. For the popIn Aladdin version of the game, a "halloween festival" was announced. The festival, which ran from October 28 to November 3, 2023, featured both three different sizes of pumpkins as well as candy that can turn the fruit it lands on to its next stage in the cycle. An official iOS version was released in Japan on January 1, 2024. The official iOS version received the English update on March 7, 2024. An official Android version was released worldwide on April 11, 2024.

== Reception ==
=== Critical reviews ===
Reception

Review scores
Publication	Score
Nintendo Life	7/10
TouchArcade	4/5
Vandal	7.5/10

Suika Game was often compared by critics to other popular puzzle games, such as Tetris and Puyo Puyo. News publications such as IGN Japan and Automaton Media made the comparison to the indie puzzle game Threes!. In Nintendo Life's review of the game, they described the game as "2048 with physics". Julia Lee of Polygon made a similar comment that it was "like a mix of Tetris and 2048 but with adorable fruit". However even with the comparisons, Lee still praised the game claiming that the game has her flipping her emotions more so than other similar puzzle games she has played, although not full sure why. She speculates the game's illustrations, physics and motivations as possible reasons.

One of the main praises of Suika Game was its charm. In his review of the game, TouchArcade's Shaun Musgrave wrote that the game does a lot to work as well as it does and positing that the game is "hard to resist". One of the main aspects he focuses on is the game's overall charm, citing that the game is "absolutely adorable" and the music in the game is catchy. Continuing on, Musgrave adds that the game's physics lead to unexpecting outcomes, making the game more exciting and dangerous for him.

Another aspect of the game that critics praised was the way the game handled strategy. Japanese website ITmedia wrote that the game was perfect for both children and adults to understand, adding that they believed that the game was "super simple yet deep". They explained that whilst the controls were simple the physics could cause unexpected outcomes, allowing the game to have a welcoming premise but also have a steep difficulty curve. Mitch Vogel of Nintendo Life mentions in his review that when playing over time the player will learn to optimise placement, making it harder for players to resist replaying. Vogel also mentions that one thrilling aspect of the game is when accurate placements can lead to a chain reaction combo.

=== Sales ===
In the span of a month starting in early September to October 5, 2023, Aladdin X announced that Suika Game had been downloaded 1 million times on the eShop. A few days later on October 16, the game had been downloaded 2 million times in Japan. By October 30, 2023, the game had been downloaded 3 million times. Aladdin X had also announced that the game had been downloaded 50,000 times more than before its popularity increased. By November 7 it had been reported that Suika Game has been downloaded 3.66 million times, splitting between 3.27 million downloads domestically and 0.39 million downloads internationally. As of November 14, 2023, Suika Game has been downloaded 4 million times; and as of December 14, the total number of downloads of Suika Game worldwide reached 5 million. In June 2024, the game was announced to have crossed 10 million downloads. As of October 2024, the game has achieved 11 million downloads. This makes the game one of the best-selling games on the Nintendo Switch overall.

Suika Game was the most downloaded game on the Nintendo Switch eShop in Japan in 2023, beating out The Legend of Zelda: Tears of the Kingdom, Pikmin 4, Super Mario Bros. Wonder, as well as other inexpensive titles such as Vampire Survivors and Overcooked 2. The game retained the title of most downloaded game on the eShop in Japan in 2024, beating games such The Exit 8. In December 2024, Apple Inc. announced that the game was the iPhone's and iPad's most downloaded and 2nd most downloaded paid games of the year on Japan's App Store respectively. In the free games category for both platforms, unofficial versions of the games were the most downloaded.

=== Unofficial versions ===
Due to the success of Suika Game, it caused many unofficial versions of the game to appear online. One of the most notable versions is a free web browser version with the same name; with websites such as Polygon, Rock Paper Shotgun and VG247 considering it a great alternative for people who were not able to make a Japanese Nintendo account, or do not have a Nintendo Switch, although noting that the physics and presentation aren't the same as the Switch version of the game. Outside of the browser version, Aladdin X warned customers that there were many smartphone games trying to imitate Suika Game with some even using art from the official versions. One particular imitation managed to reach number one on the Japanese App Store in the free games' "casual" section, prompting Aladdin X to request Apple to take the imitation off the service.

On October 30, 2023, Automaton Media reported that the amount of clones on the App Store had become an increasing problem. They specifically pointed out that more than half of the top five games on the "free download" rankings for both iPad and iPhone in Japan were fake versions of Suika Game, mentioning that some of the fake versions were made by the same individual developer. Additionally, it was pointed out that the BGM for the game was being sold on online music sites.

Outside of the fake versions of the game, many fan games and parodies also arose in the wake of the game's success. Some fan games are simple retextures, such as one that replaced the fruit with the VTuber talents of Hololive. "Hokkaido Game", a fan game that replaced the fruits with the prefectures of Japan, received particular attention due to the shape of the prefectures changing the collision between two drops. Other fan games added new features; such as "Whale Game Online", which added 2-player multiplayer on top of swapping the fruits for sea creatures. Games like "Watermelon Mori" put a change to the formula by changing the movement to 3D, where the player must instead shoot the fruit from the perimeter onto a plate, with the difficulty coming from the physics of the fruit rolling around. Other fan games have since also opted for the 3D style gameplay. The puzzle game Agreeee features a parody of the game as one of its minigames.

=== Accolades ===
Year	Award	Category	Result	Ref.
2023	The Vtuber Awards	Stream Game of The Year	Won	
2024	Japan Game Awards	Movement Award	Won	
