= Vault Corp. v. Quaid Software Ltd. =

U.S. legal case

Vault Corporation v. Quaid Software Limited
- Court: United States Court of Appeals for the Fifth Circuit
- Full case name: Vault Corporation v. Quaid Software Limited
- Decided: June 20 1988
- Citation: 847 F.2d 255 (5th Cir. 1988)

Case history
- Prior history: 655 F.Supp. 750 (E.D.La.1987)

Holding
- Quaid's RAM copies are not infringing and Quaid's software is not a derivative work. Quaid is not liable for contributory infringement because its software can be used for making fair use archival copies of software. The Louisiana License Act's clause prohibiting decompilation or disassembly is unenforceable because it is preempted by federal copyright law.

Court membership
- Judges sitting: Thomas Morrow Reavley, Carolyn Dineen King, Jerry Edwin Smith

Case opinions
- Majority: Thomas Morrow Reavley

Laws applied
- 17 U.S.C. §101 et seq. (Copyright Act of 1976)

Vault Corporation v Quaid Software Ltd. 847 F.2d 255 (5th Cir. 1988) is a case heard by the United States Court of Appeals for the Fifth Circuit that tested the extent of software copyright. The court held that making RAM copies as an essential step in utilizing software was permissible under §117 of the Copyright Act even if they are used for a purpose that the copyright holder did not intend. It also applied the "substantial noninfringing uses" test from Sony Corp. of America v. Universal City Studios, Inc. to hold that Quaid's software, which defeated Vault's copy protection mechanism, did not make Quaid liable for contributory infringement. It held that Quaid's software was not a derivative work of Vault's software, despite having approximately 30 characters of source code in common. Finally, it held that the Louisiana Software License Enforcement Act clause permitting a copyright holder to prohibit software decompilation or disassembly was preempted by the Copyright Act, and was therefore unenforceable.

== Background information ==
Vault Corporation, based in California, created and held the copyright for a program called PROLOK, which provided copy protection for software on floppy disks. Software companies purchased PROLOK from Vault in order to protect their software from end users making unauthorized copies. PROLOK worked by having an indelible "fingerprint" on each PROLOK protected disk in addition to the PROLOK software and the software to be protected. The PROLOK protected program allowed the software to function only if the fingerprint was present on the disk.

Quaid Software Ltd., based in Canada, created a program called RAMKEY, which allowed copies of Vault's clients' software to function without the original program disks. RAMKEY made PROLOK think that the necessary fingerprint was present even though it was not.

== Actions and claims ==
Vault sought preliminary and permanent injunctions against Quaid to prevent them from advertising and selling RAMKEY. They also sought an order to impound all of Quaid's copies of RAMKEY, as well as $100,000,000 in monetary damages. Vault asserted the following claims:

1. Infringement of the exclusive right to copy by copying PROLOK into RAM for a purpose other than that intended by Vault
2. Contributory infringement by providing software that customers can use to infringe on Vault's and Vault's clients' copyrights
3. Creation of an infringing derivative work by one version of RAMKEY that contained approximately 30 characters of the PROLOK source code
4. Breach of license agreement based on Louisiana License Act, which Vault utilized to attempt to prohibit decompilation and disassembly of its software

== Procedural history ==
The district court initially dismissed Vault's complaint for lack of personal jurisdiction, but this was reversed by the circuit court. On remand, the district court denied Vault's motion for a preliminary injunction. After agreement by both parties to submit the case for final decision, the district court entered a final judgment based on its decision on the preliminary injunction. Vault subsequently appealed.

== Direct infringement claim ==
The district court held that Quaid's copying of the software into RAM was permissible under 17 U.S.C. § 117(1), which permits copies "created as an essential step." Vault argued that the §117(1) exemption does not apply when the program is used in a manner not intended by the copyright holder. The circuit court disagreed with this argument, writing that the statute does not contain "language to suggest that the copy it permits must be employed for a use intended by the copyright owner."

== Contributory infringement claim ==
Sony Corp. of America v. Universal City Studios, Inc. established the "substantial non-infringing use" test for contributory infringement. Quaid argued that RAMKEY passes this test because it can be used to create archival copies that are exempt under 17 U.S.C. §117(2). Vault argued that RAMKEY did not have any non-infringing use because one could create a sufficient archival copy without the use of RAMKEY. Vault asserted that the archival copy exemption of 17 U.S.C. §117(2) was designed to protect only against "destruction or damage by mechanical or electrical failure," but not against (for example) loss or destruction of a disk. The court declined to construe the archival exemption in this manner, saying that even though it had appeal, it was not the law and that only the Congress could decide to limit the exemption in that way.

== Derivative work claim ==
One version of RAMKEY contained approximately 30 characters of source code from PROLOK. Vault alleged that this constituted an infringing derivative work.

The district court focused on the size of the copied code, arguing that it was not significant. Vault argued that the court should instead focus on the qualitative aspect of the copied code because the 30 characters were important to the correct operation of PROLOK. The circuit court rejected the argument that the copying was qualitatively significant on the basis that PROLOK and RAMKEY "serve opposing functions."

== Louisiana Software License Enforcement Act claim ==
The license agreement for PROLOK depended on the Louisiana Software License Enforcement Act to give it the authority to prohibit users from decompiling or disassembling the software. The Act purported to permit certain license agreements to contain "...prohibitions on translating, reverse engineering, decompiling, disassembling, and/or creating derivative works based on the computer software." Vault had included such a provision in its license agreement and claimed that Quaid violated this provision when it reverse engineered PROLOK. The district court held that the Louisiana License Act was unenforceable because it was preempted by the Copyright Act. The circuit court ruled only on the clause permitting a licensor to prohibit decompilation or disassembly, holding that this clause was preempted by the exemptions of 17 U.S.C. §117, which grant permission to make "essential step" and archival copies.

== See also ==
- MAI Systems Corp. v. Peak Computer, Inc.
- Sony Corp. of America v. Universal City Studios, Inc.
- Software license
