= Prolok =

Copy protection software

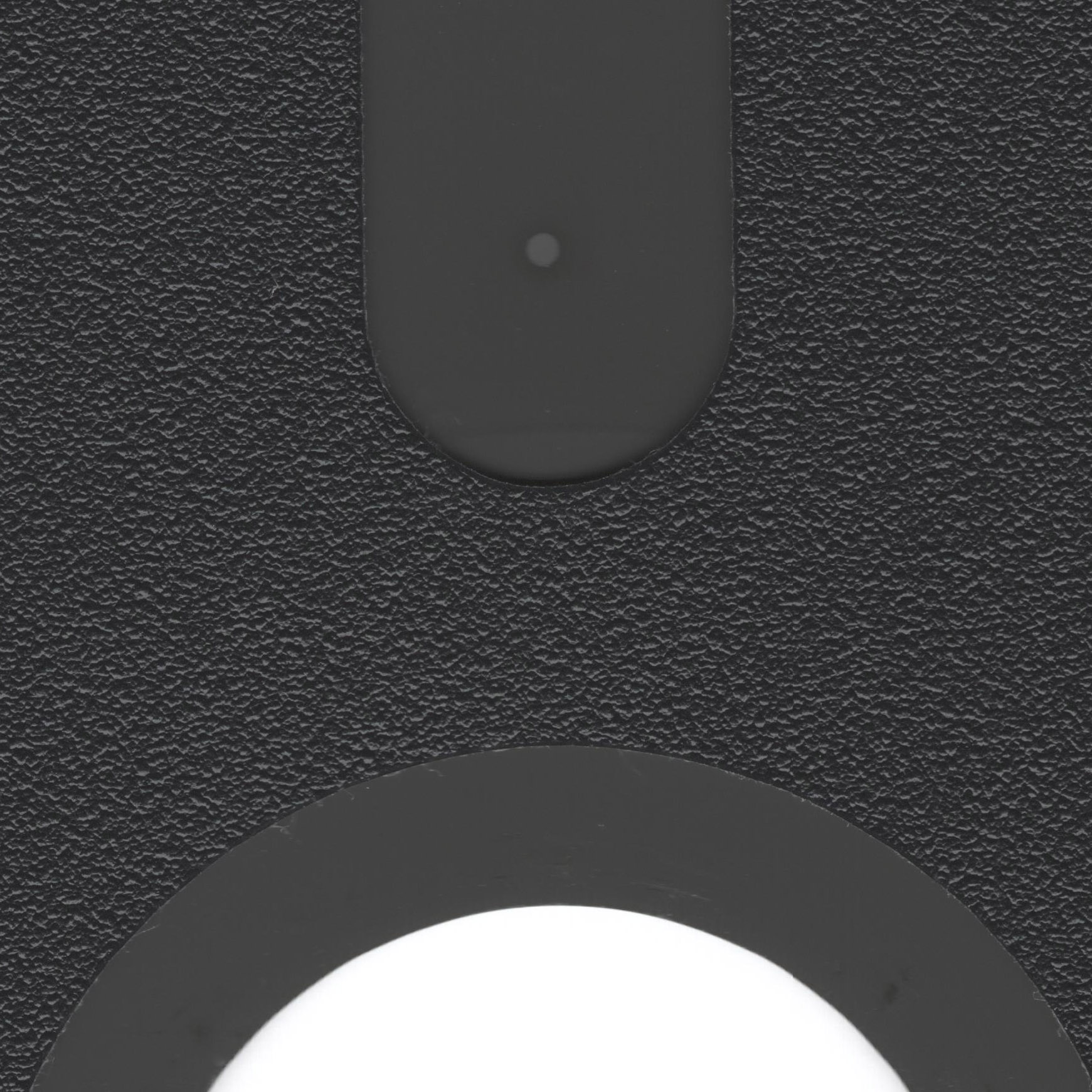
A Prolok fingerprint on a copy-protected floppy disk

Prolok was a copy protection system developed by W. Krag Brotby and Vault Corporation in 1982. Prolok was involved in the copyright law case Vault Corp. v. Quaid Software Ltd. which allowed software to be used in certain situations that the copyright holder did not originally intend.

Prolok was developed for Apple II, CP/M, CP/M-86, MS-DOS, Microsoft Windows and OS/2. The company obtained US Patent 4,785,361, which listed Brotby as the technology's inventor.

The patent describes a technique in which the surface of the disk is modified with a physical fingerprint, which the protected software can verify and which would be impossible to duplicate with normal means.

Vault's largest customer was Ashton-Tate, publishers of the popular database software dBase. Ashton-Tate utilized the Prolok protection scheme on PC releases of dBase III and Framework 1.0.

Vault's fortunes turned after they announced their "Prolok Plus" product. Prolok Plus was announced as having the capability to release a worm on any system where an unauthorized copy of Prolok-protected software was detected. The negative consumer reaction to this announcement caused Ashton-Tate to discontinue use of the Prolok protection and caused significant reputational damage to the Prolok brand.

Prolok Plus was ultimately never released.
