= Agreeee =

2025 video game

- Official English banner art on Steam
- Developer: Vestman
- Platform: Windows
- Release: WW: December 5, 2025; (Windows)
- Genre: Puzzle
- Mode: Single-player

Agreeee (Note: Japanese: 利用規約に同意したい, Hepburn: Riyō Kiyaku ni Dōi Shitai; lit. "I want to agree to the terms of service") is a Japanese puzzle video game developed by the indie developer Vestman. It was released on Steam on December 5, 2025.

== Gameplay ==
After the player presses "Start Game", ostensibly to play a side-scrolling game known as Doki-Doki Action Game, the game asks the player to agree to 12 articles of the terms of service; this turns out to be a collection of more than 100 different minigames, including a pinball game, a whack-a-mole game, a daruma otoshi game, a slot machine game, a roulette game, a cooking game, a sniping game, a claw machine game, a pin-pulling puzzle, a chicken game, a bullet hell game, a bomb defusal game, an RPG-like command battles and parodies of other video games such as Flappy Bird, Breakout, Suika Game, Tetris, and Mega Man Battle Network.

If the player presses "Disagree" at any point, the process starts over from the beginning. After clearing the "12 terms of service" minigames, the player can play the Doki-Doki Action Game, which includes a ranking function where they can compete to reach the goal in the shortest time. The game also features a "casual mode" allowing the player to retry from where they left off instead of from the beginning, and to shuffle the order of the minigames when retrying.

== Development and release ==
The game was developed by indie game developer Vestman. According to the developer, he wanted "to use the game to draw people's attention to the fact that nobody reads the terms of service." During development, a bug was discovered where the timer starts once the service confirmation pop-up displays, before the player "agrees" to the terms of service, but the developers indicated that they would leave it as-is because "it's too much hassle to fix".

The game was announced on June 14, 2025. A demo was released on September 22, 2025, on Steam. A preview of the game was shown as a playtest during the Tokyo Game Show 2025. The full version of the game was released on Steam on December 5, 2025.

== Reception ==
The game peaked at 500 concurrent players on Steam on December 27, 2025. By January 7, 2026, the game had sold over 30,000 copies. It gained popularity among let's players and streamers such as VTubers from Hololive and Nijisanji. There were also several instances of endurance streams of the game lasting over 10 hours.

Kenken of Famitsu praised the game for its difficult gameplay, praising the developer's use of "clever and malicious tricks that played on the player's psychology". Takahiro Kobayashi of Real Sound praised the idea of the game, adding that the reason this game is attracting attention is because of "its unconventional structure". Terukazu Yoshida of GameSpark praised the game for its large library of minigames.
