= SoftMan Products Co. v. Adobe Systems Inc. =

SoftMan Products Co. v. Adobe Systems
- Court: United States District Court for the Central District of California
- Full case name: SoftMan Products Company, LLC v. Adobe Systems Inc., et al.
- Decided: October 19, 2001
- Citation: 171 F. Supp.2d 1075; 2001 U.S. Dist. LEXIS 17723; 45 U.C.C. Rep. Serv. 2d (Callaghan) 945

Case history
- Prior actions: Preliminary injunction entered for plaintiff, 9-10-01
- Subsequent action: none

Court membership
- Judge sitting: Dean D. Pregerson

Case opinions
- Plaintiff software company's product was sold rather than licensed to the defendant, who was therefore entitled to resell it in separate components. The defendant was not bound by the software "shrinkwrap license" (or End User License Agreement) because the terms of that license were never assented to. Preliminary injunction previously entered for the plaintiff was vacated, and a new injunction denied.

SoftMan Products Co. v. Adobe Systems Inc. was a lawsuit heard in the U.S. District Court for the Central District of California in 2001 by Judge Dean D. Pregerson.

Adobe Systems contended in a counterclaim that the original plaintiff, SoftMan, distributed unauthorized Adobe software, specifically Adobe Educational software and sold individual units the software titles that were purchased from Adobe as a single boxed "Collection". Adobe claimed that these actions are infringing Adobe's copyright and violate Adobe's terms of service. Adobe also alleged SoftMan of trademark violation by distributing incomplete versions of their software.

Judge Pregerson ruled that Adobe has sold its software instead of licensed the software. Thus under the first-sale doctrine, Adobe can not control how SoftMan resells those particular copies of Adobe software after the initial sale. The Court also found that SoftMan had not infringed on the EULA because SoftMan had never run the program and therefore never assented to the terms. In addition, the Court found that factual disputes exist on whether the separately sold copies are materially different from the original copies, which is central to Adobe's trademark claim. Since Adobe was unable to demonstrate a likelihood of success on both copyright and trademark claims, the Court denied Adobe's application for a preliminary injunction against SoftMan.

== Background ==
Adobe produces a suite of publishing software. SoftMan sells various software through its website, including individual copies of Adobe software that was originally part of a bundle. Adobe claims such sales are unauthorized and SoftMan is infringing both Adobe's copyright and violating terms of service that is embedded in each Adobe Software. The users need to agree to these EULA to install the software. In addition, Adobe claims that SoftMan is distributing Adobe software that is not genuine, because unbundled software does not give the customers access to Adobe's support services. Based on the aforementioned claims, Adobe applied for a preliminary injunction.

== Copyright and EULA claim ==
In response to Adobe's claim, SoftMan argues that first sale doctrine allows SoftMan to unbundle and sell the Adobe software without Adobe's restrictions. Adobe asserts that it does not sell any software, rather it licenses its end users the software. Furthermore, the EULA attached to each copy of the software prohibits the "licensee" to unbundle the software.

The court disagrees with Adobe's assertion. Since the purchaser pays a fixed fee to obtain the rights to use the software for an indefinite period of time and also accepts the risk commonly associated with a sale, the court determines the transactions between Adobe and SoftMan are sales. Thus, the first sale doctrine applies and Adobe's copyright claims are rejected.

In response to Adobe's claim that SoftMan violated terms of service described in the EULA, the court decides that SoftMan is not bound by the EULA because there was no assent. However, the court declines to comment on the general issue of shrinkwrap licenses.

== Trademark claim ==
Adobe claims that the software sold by SoftMan is not genuine and is infringing on its trademark. SoftMan admits that it repackages the unbundled Adobe Software using Adobe logo. This is not considered trademark infringement under the first sale doctrine. However, the first sale doctrine does not protect any product that is "materially different" from the genuine product. Adobe argues that the resold software lacks customer and technical support that comes with the original bundle. SoftMan disputes this and claims individual software can be registered separately and receive support. Since this dispute exists and not issuing an injunction is likely not going to cause irreparable injury to Adobe, the preliminary injunction is denied.

== See also ==
- List of leading legal cases in copyright law
- First-sale doctrine
- Copyright infringement of software
- Step-Saver Data Systems, Inc. v. Wyse Technology
