= Software license =

Legal instrument governing software

Diagram of software under various licenses according to the FSF and their The Free Software Definition: on the left side "free software", on the right side "proprietary software". On both sides, and therefore mostly orthogonal, "free download" (Freeware).

A software license is a legal instrument governing the use or redistribution of software.

Since the 1970s, software copyright has been recognized in the United States. Despite the copyright being recognized, most companies prefer to sell licenses rather than copies of the software because it enables them to enforce stricter terms on redistribution. Very few purchasers read any part of the license, initially shrink-wrap contracts and now most commonly encountered as clickwrap or browsewrap. The enforceability of this kind of license is a matter of controversy and is limited in some jurisdictions. Service-level agreements are another type of software license where the vendor agrees to provide a level of service to the purchaser, often backed by financial penalties.

Copyleft is a type of license that mandates derivative works to be licensed under the license's terms. Copyleft licenses are free and open source licenses. Attempts have been made to describe licenses which do not uphold the Four Freedoms, such as the Server Side Public License and others, as "copyleft", but this is widely rejected as an abuse of the term. The other types of free licenses lack this requirement: for permissive licenses, attribution is typically the only requirement, and public-domain-equivalent licenses have no restrictions. The proliferation of open-source licenses has compounded license compatibility issues, but all share some features: allowing redistribution and derivative works under the same license, unrestricted access to the source code, and nondiscrimination between different uses—in particular, allowing commercial use.

	Free and open			Non-free			
	Public domain and equivalent licenses	Permissive license	Copyleft	Noncommercial license	Proprietary license	Trade secret	Source Available
Description	Waives copyright protection	Grants use rights, including right to relicense (allows proprietization, license compatibility)	Grants use rights, forbids proprietization	Grants rights for noncommercial use only.	Traditional use of copyright; no rights need be granted	No information made public	Grants use rights, but restricts them to certain use cases, not free software or copyleft
Notable software licenses	PD, CC0	MIT, Apache, MPL, BSD	GPL, AGPL	JRL	Proprietary software		SSPL

== Software copyright ==
The source code (or compiled binaries in the form of object code) of a computer program is protected by copyright law that vests the owner with the exclusive right to copy the code. The underlying ideas or algorithms are not protected by copyright law, but are often treated as a trade secret and concealed by such methods as non-disclosure agreements. Software copyright has been recognized since the mid-1970s and is vested in the company that makes the software, not the employees or contractors who wrote it.

Software licenses and rights granted in context of the copyright according to Mark Webbink. Expanded by freeware and sublicensing.
Rights granted	Public domain and equivalent	Permissive FOSS license (e.g. BSD license)	Copyleft FOSS license (e.g. GPL)	Freeware / Shareware / Freemium	Proprietary license	Trade secret
Copyright retained	No	Yes	Yes	Yes	Yes	Yes
Right to execute	Yes	Yes	Yes	Yes	Yes	No
Right to display	Yes	Yes	Yes	Yes	Yes	No
Right to copy	Yes	Yes	Yes	Often	No	Lawsuits are filed by the owner against copyright infringement the most
Right to modify	Yes	Yes	Yes	No	No	No
Right to distribute	Yes	Yes, under same license	Yes, under same license	Often	No	No
Right to sublicense	Yes	Yes	No	No	No	No
Example software	SQLite, ImageJ	Apache web server, ToyBox	Linux kernel, GIMP, OBS	Irfanview, Winamp	Windows, the majority of commercial video games and their DRMs, Spotify, xSplit, TIDAL	Server-side; Cloud computing programs and services, forensic applications, and other line-of-business work.

== Proprietary software licenses ==
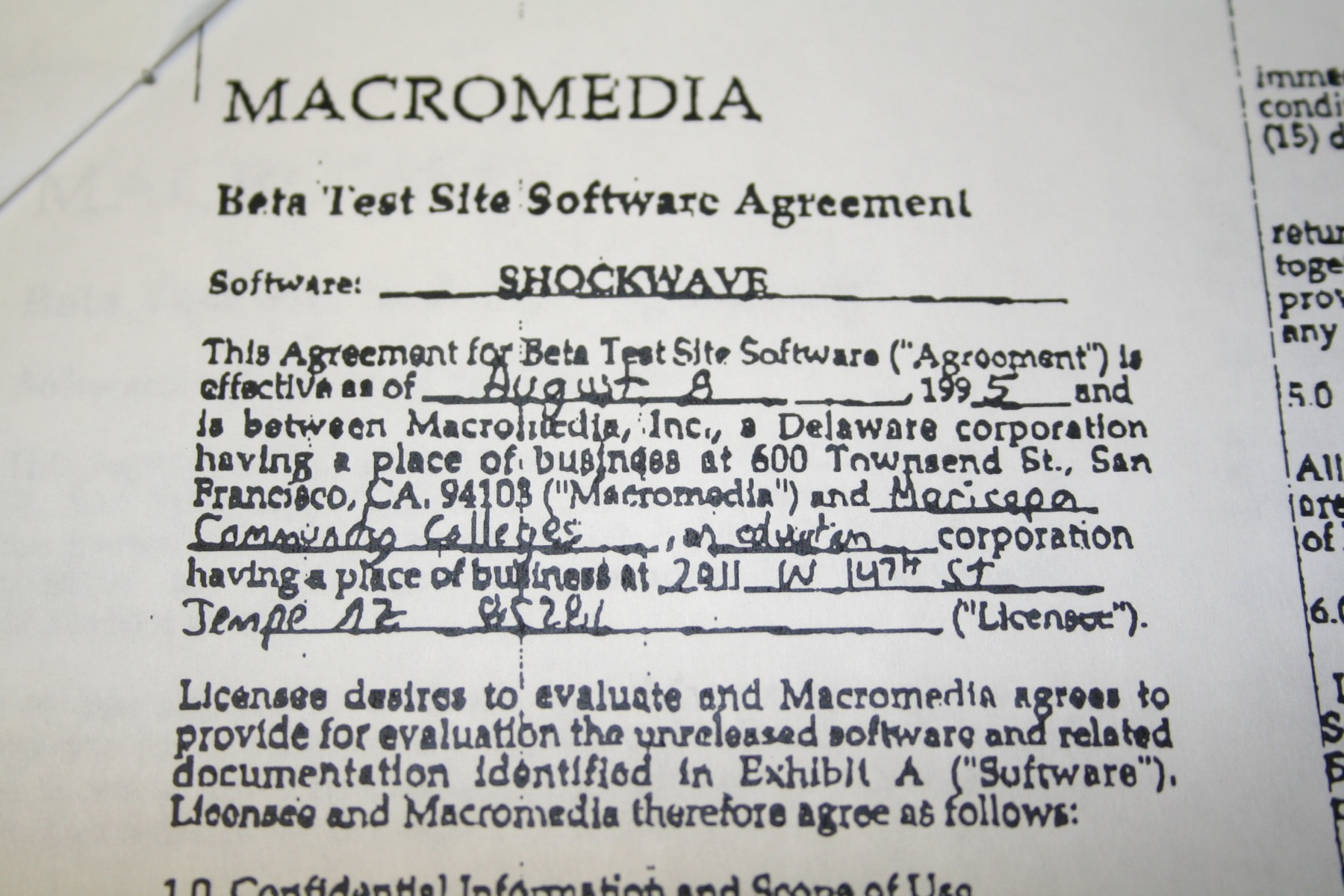
A brief, written-out beta test software license issued by Macromedia in 1995

The tendency to license proprietary software, rather than sell it, dates from the time period before the existence, then the scope of software copyright protection was clear. These licenses have continued in use after software copyright was recognized in the courts, and are considered to grant the company extra protection compared to copyright law. According to United States federal law, a company can restrict the parties to which it sells but it cannot prevent a buyer from reselling the product. Software licensing agreements usually prohibit resale, enabling the company to maximize revenue.

Traditionally, software was distributed in the form of binary object code that could not be understood or modified by the user, but could be downloaded and run. The user bought a perpetual license to use a particular version of the software. Software as service (SaaS) vendors—who have the majority market share in application software as of 2023—rarely offer perpetual licenses. SaaS licenses are usually temporary and charged on a pay-per-usage or subscription basis, although other revenue models such as freemium are also used. For customers, the advantages of temporary licenses include reduced upfront cost, increased flexibility, and lower overall cost compared to a perpetual license. In some cases, the steep one-time cost demanded by sellers of traditional software were out of the reach of smaller businesses, but pay-per-use SaaS models makes the software affordable.

=== End-user license agreement (EULA) ===
Initially, end-user license agreements (EULAs) were printed on either the shrinkwrap packaging encasing the product (see shrink-wrap contract) or a piece of paper. The license often stipulated that a customer agreed if they did not return the product within a specified interval. More recently, EULAs are most commonly found as clickwrap or browsewrap where the user's clicks or continued browsing are taken as a sign of agreement. As a result of the end of physical constraints, length increased. Most EULAs have been designed so that it is very difficult to read and understand them, but easy to agree to the licensing terms without reading them. Regardless of how easy it is to access, very few consumers read any part of the license agreement. Most assume the terms are unobjectionable or barely notice agreeing while installing the software. Companies take advantage of consumers' inattention to insert provisions into EULAs.

Proprietary software is usually offered under a restrictive license that bans copying and reuse and often limits the purchaser to using the software on one computer. Source code is rarely available. Derivative software works and reverse engineering are usually explicitly prohibited. Many EULAs allow the vendor to collect information about the user and use it in unrestricted ways. Some EULAs restrict the ability of users to exercise copyright over derivative work made using the software, such as creative creations in the virtual worlds of video games.

Most disclaim any liability for harms caused by the product, and prevent the purchaser from accessing the court system to seek a remedy. Furthermore, many EULAs allow the vendor to change the terms at any time and the customer must choose between agreeing or ceasing use of the product, without getting a refund. It is common for EULAs to allow unilateral termination by the vendor for any number of vague reasons or none at all.

EULAs, almost always offered on a take-it-or-leave-it basis as a non-negotiable condition for using the software, are very far from the prototypical contract where both parties fully understand the terms and agree of their own free will. There has been substantial debate on to what extent the agreements can be considered binding. Before 1996 in the United States, clickwrap or browsewrap licenses were not held to be binding, but since then they often have been. Under the New Digital Content Directive effective in the European Union, EULAs are only enforceable to the extent that they do not breach reasonable consumer expectations. The gap between expectations and the content of EULAs is especially wide when it comes to restrictions on copying and transferring ownership of digital content. Many EULAs contain stipulations that are likely unenforceable depending on the jurisdiction. Software vendors keep these unenforceable provisions in the agreements, perhaps because users rarely resort to the legal system to challenge them.

=== Service-level agreement (SLA) ===
Service-level agreements are often used for enterprise software and guarantee a level of service, such as software performance or time to respond to issue raised by the customer. Many stipulate financial penalties if the service falls short of the agreed standard. SLAs often cover such aspects as availability, reliability, price, and security using quantifiable metrics. Multi-tier SLAs are common in cloud computing because of the use of different computing services that may be managed by different companies. SLAs in cloud computing are an area under active research as of 2024.

== Free and open-source software licenses ==
Before the open-source movement in the 1980s, almost all software was proprietary and did not disclose its source code. Open-source licensing is intended to maximize openness and minimize barriers to software use, dissemination, and follow-on innovation.

Open-source licenses share a number of key characteristics:

- Free redistribution: Anyone can redistribute the software, for free or for cost, without the permission of or payment to the copyright holder.
- Unrestricted, public access to the source code—what the term open source refers to
- Users may modify the software and release derivative works, either under the same terms as the free software or, in some cases, under a different license.
- Nondiscrimination between different uses, including commercial use.

The Open Source Initiative vets and approves new open-source licenses that comply with its Open Source Definition.

=== Types of open-source licenses ===
The most popular open source licenses as of 2022 are the Apache License (permissive), the MIT License (permissive), and the GPL (copyleft).

- If software is in the public domain, the owner's copyright has been extinguished and anyone may use the work with no copyright restrictions.
- Non-restrictive licenses allow free reuse of the work without restrictions on the licensing of derivative works. Many of them require attribution of the original creators. The first open-source license was a non-restrictive license intended to facilitate scientific collaboration: the Berkeley Software Distribution (BSD), named after the University of California, Berkeley in 1978.
- Copyleft licenses (also known as "share-alike"), require source code to be distributed with software and require the source code be made available under a similar license. Copyleft represents the farthest that reuse can be restricted while still being considered free software. Strong copyleft licenses, such as the GNU General Public License (GPL), allow for no reuse in proprietary software, while weak copyleft, such as the related GNU Lesser General Public License (LGPL), do allow reuse in some circumstances. Copyleft licenses are perceived by developers as a way of ensuring that their contributions do not create unfair advantages for others. Another motivation for choosing copyleft is to promote open source through its requirements for derivative works: Stallman states that "the central idea of copyleft is to use copyright law, but flip it over to serve the opposite of its usual purpose: instead of a means of privatizing software, [copyright] becomes a means of keeping software free."

Outside of software, noncommercial-only Creative Commons licenses have become popular among some artists who wish to prevent others from profiting excessively from their work. However, software that is made available for noncommercial use only is not considered open source. Sun Microsystems' noncommercial-only Java Research License was rejected by the open-source community, and in 2006 the company released most of Java under the GPL.

=== Compatibility ===
Compatibility chart for some open-source software licenses

Since 1989, a variety of open-source licenses for software have been created. Choosing an open-source software license has grown increasingly difficult due to the proliferation of licenses, many of which are only trivially distinct. Many licenses are incompatible with each other, hampering the goals of the free software movement. Translation issues, ambiguity in licensing terms, and incompatibility of some licenses with the law in certain jurisdictions compounds the problem.

Although downloading an open-source module is quick and easy, complying with the licensing terms can be more difficult. The amount of software dependencies means that engineers working on complex projects must often rely on software license management software in order to help them achieve compliance with the licensing terms of open-source components. Many open-source software files do not unambiguously state the license, increasing the difficulties of compliance. When combining code bases, the original licenses can be maintained for separate components, and the larger work released under a compatible license. This compatibility is often one-way. Public domain content can be used anywhere as there is no copyright claim, but code acquired under almost any set of terms cannot be waved to the public domain. Permissive licenses can be used within copyleft works, but copyleft material cannot be released under a permissive license. Some weak copyleft licenses can be used under the GPL and are said to be GPL-compatible. GPL software can only be used under the GPL or AGPL.

=== Enforceability ===
Free and open-source software licenses have been successfully enforced in civil court since the mid-2000s. Courts have found that distributing software indicates acceptance of the license's terms. However, developers typically achieve compliance without lawsuits. Social pressures, such as the potential for community backlash, are often sufficient. Cease and desist letters are a common method to bring companies back into compliance, especially in Germany.

A long-debated subject within the FOSS community is whether open-source licenses are "bare licenses" or contracts. A bare license is a set of conditions under which actions otherwise restricted by intellectual property laws are permitted. Under the bare license interpretation, advocated by the Free Software Foundation (FSF), a case is brought to court by the copyright holder as copyright infringement. Under the contract interpretation, a case can be brought to court by an involved party as a breach of contract. United States and French courts have tried cases under both interpretations.

=== Value ===
More than 90 percent of companies use open-source software as a component of their proprietary software. The decision to use open-source software, or even engage with open-source projects to improve existing open-source software, is typically a pragmatic business decision. When proprietary software is in direct competition with an open-source alternative, research has found conflicting results on the effect of the competition on the proprietary product's price and quality.

For decades, some companies have made servicing of an open-source software product for enterprise users as their business model. These companies control an open-source software product, and instead of charging for licensing or use, charge for improvements, integration, and other servicing. Software as a service (SaaS) products based on open-source components are increasingly common.

Open-source software is preferred for scientific applications, because it increases transparency and aids in the validation and acceptance of scientific results.

== See also ==
- Comparison of free and open-source software licenses
- Digital rights management
- Copy protection
- Dual-licensing
- License-free software
- License manager
- Product activation
- Product key
- Rights Expression Language
- Software metering
- Terms of service
- Perpetual access
- Copyright licenses (category)
- Software by license (category)

== Sources ==
- Ahuja, Neha (2016). "Commercial Creations: The Role of End User License Agreements in Controlling the Exploitation of User Generated Content". John Marshall Review of Intellectual Property Law. 16: 381–410.
- Alamoudi, Emad; Mehmood, Rashid; Aljudaibi, Wajdi; Albeshri, Aiiad; Hasan, Syed Hamid (2020). "Open Source and Open Data Licenses in the Smart Infrastructure Era: Review and License Selection Frameworks". Smart Infrastructure and Applications: Foundations for Smarter Cities and Societies. Springer International Publishing. pp. 537–559. ISBN 978-3-030-13705-2.
- Anesa, Patrizia (1 March 2014). "Translating end-user license agreements: issues, strategies and techniques". ASp. La revue du GERAS. 65 (65): 87–102. doi:10.4000/asp.4205. ISSN 1246-8185.
- August, Terrence; Chen, Wei; Zhu, Kevin (2021). "Competition Among Proprietary and Open-Source Software Firms: The Role of Licensing in Strategic Contribution". Management Science. 67 (5): 3041–3066. doi:10.1287/mnsc.2020.3674.
- Bakos, Yannis; Marotta-Wurgler, Florencia; Trossen, David R. (2014). "Does Anyone Read the Fine Print? Consumer Attention to Standard-Form Contracts". The Journal of Legal Studies. 43 (1): 1–35. doi:10.1086/674424.
- Ballhausen, Miriam (2022). "Copyright Enforcement". Open Source Law, Policy and Practice. Oxford University Press. pp. 126–140. ISBN 978-0-19-886234-5.
- Ben-Shahar, Omri; Schneider, Carl E. (2014). More Than You Wanted to Know: The Failure of Mandated Disclosure. Princeton University Press. ISBN 978-0-691-16170-9.
- Bernelin, Margo (2020). "The compatibility of open/free licences: a legal imbroglio". International Journal of Law and Information Technology. 28 (2): 93–111. doi:10.1093/ijlit/eaaa010.
- Boyle, James (2003). "The Second Enclosure Movement and the Construction of the Public Domain". Law and Contemporary Problems. 66 (1): 33–74. ISSN 0023-9186.
- Butler, Simon; Gamalielsson, Jonas; Lundell, Björn; Brax, Christoffer; Mattsson, Anders; Gustavsson, Tomas; Feist, Jonas; Kvarnström, Bengt; Lönroth, Erik (2022). "Considerations and challenges for the adoption of open source components in software-intensive businesses". Journal of Systems and Software. 186 111152. Elsevier BV. doi:10.1016/j.jss.2021.111152. ISSN 0164-1212.
- Carpenter, Owen (2023). "EULA, or Eulogy? Reckoning End User License Agreements and Near-Future Cyborgs". Health Matrix: Journal of Law-Medicine. 33: 467–498.
- Clohessy, Trevor; Acton, Thomas; Morgan, Lorraine (2020). "The SaaS Payoff: Measuring the Business Value of Provisioning Software-as-a-Service Technologies". Measuring the Business Value of Cloud Computing. Springer International Publishing. pp. 39–55. ISBN 978-3-030-43198-3.
- Corbett, Susan (2019). "Computer game licences: The EULA and its discontents". Computer Law & Security Review. 35 (4): 453–461. doi:10.1016/j.clsr.2019.03.007. ISSN 0267-3649.
- Davila, Jacinto (2015). "The Political Logic of Free, Libre, Open Source Software". Societal Benefits of Freely Accessible Technologies and Knowledge Resources. IGI Global. pp. 1–24. ISBN 978-1-4666-8337-2.
- Dempsey, David; Kelliher, Felicity (2018). Industry Trends in Cloud Computing: Alternative Business-to-Business Revenue Models. Springer International Publishing. ISBN 978-3-319-87693-1.
- Fagundes, Dave; Perzanowski, Aaron (November 2020). "Abandoning Copyright". William & Mary Law Review. 62 (2): 487–569.
- Joy, Reagan (2022). "The Tragedy of the Creative Commons: An Analysis of How Overlapping Intellectual Property Rights Undermine the Use of Permissive Licensing". Case Western Reserve Law Review. 72 (4): 977–1013.
- Kim, Nancy S. (2016). "Wrap contracting and the online environment: Causes and cures". Research Handbook on Electronic Commerce Law. Edward Elgar Publishing. ISBN 978-1-78347-992-4.
- Langer, Arthur M. (2016). Guide to Software Development: Designing and Managing the Life Cycle. Springer. ISBN 978-1-4471-6799-0.
- Morin, Andrew; Urban, Jennifer; Sliz, Piotr (2012). "A Quick Guide to Software Licensing for the Scientist-Programmer". PLOS Computational Biology. 8 (7) e1002598. Bibcode:2012PLSCB...8E2598M. doi:10.1371/journal.pcbi.1002598. ISSN 1553-7358. PMC 3406002. PMID 22844236. This article incorporates text available under the CC BY 4.0 license.
- Ombredanne, Philippe (2020). "Free and Open Source Software License Compliance: Tools for Software Composition Analysis". Computer. 53 (10): 105–109. doi:10.1109/MC.2020.3011082.
- Oprysk, Liliia; Sein, Karin (June 2020). "Limitations in End-User Licensing Agreements: Is There a Lack of Conformity Under the New Digital Content Directive?". IIC - International Review of Intellectual Property and Competition Law. 51 (5): 594–623. doi:10.1007/s40319-020-00941-y.
- O'Regan, Gerard (2022). Concise Guide to Software Engineering: From Fundamentals to Application Methods. Springer Nature. ISBN 978-3-031-07816-3.
- Qazi, Faiza; Kwak, Daehan; Khan, Fiaz Gul; Ali, Farman; Khan, Sami Ullah (2024). "Service Level Agreement in cloud computing: Taxonomy, prospects, and challenges". Internet of Things. 25 101126. doi:10.1016/j.iot.2024.101126. ISSN 2542-6605.
- Rana, Omer; Ziegler, Wolfgang (2010). "Research Challenges in Managing and Using Service Level Agreements". Grids, P2P and Services Computing. Springer. ISBN 978-1-4419-6793-0.
- Sen, Ravi; Subramaniam, Chandrasekar; Nelson, Matthew L. (2008). "Determinants of the Choice of Open Source Software License". Journal of Management Information Systems. 25 (3). Informa UK Limited: 207–240. doi:10.2753/mis0742-1222250306. ISSN 0742-1222.
- Smith, P McCoy (20 October 2022). "Copyright, Contract, and Licensing in Open Source". Open Source Law, Policy and Practice. Oxford University PressOxford. pp. 71–112. doi:10.1093/oso/9780198862345.003.0003. ISBN 978-0-19-886234-5.
- St. Laurent, Andrew M. (2004). Understanding Open Source and Free Software Licensing. O'Reilly Media. ISBN 978-0-596-00581-8.
- Terasaki, Michael (2013). "Do End User License Agreements Bind Normal People". Western State University Law Review. 41: 467.
- Walden, Ian (20 October 2022). "Open Source as Philosophy, Methodology, and Commerce: Using Law with Attitude". Open Source Law, Policy and Practice. Oxford University Press. doi:10.1093/oso/9780198862345.003.0001. ISBN 978-0-19-886234-5.
- Watt, Andy (2023). Building Modern SaaS Applications with C# And . NET: Build, Deploy, and Maintain Professional SaaS Applications. Packt. ISBN 978-1-80461-087-9.
- Zhou, Zach Zhizhong; Choudhary, Vidyanand (2022). "Impact of Competition from Open Source Software on Proprietary Software". Production and Operations Management. 31 (2): 731–742. doi:10.1111/poms.13575.
