= Quaid Software =

Software company in Canada

Quaid Software, Ltd.
- Industry: software
- Headquarters: Toronto, Ontario
- Key people: Robert McQuaid (President)
- Products: Copywrite

Quaid Software, Ltd. was a software publisher based in Toronto, Ontario. The company's best known product was Copywrite which company president Robert McQuaid claimed was "for making legal backup copies of a protected program."

The company was the subject to a lawsuit claiming that the software was used for making illegal copies. The lawsuit was dismissed because Section 117 of the US Copyright Act specifically allows:

- the new copy is being made for archival (i.e., backup) purposes only;
- you are the legal owner of the copy; and
- any copy made for archival purposes is either destroyed, or transferred with the original copy, once the original copy is sold, given away, or otherwise transferred.

The Court concluded that, because of federal copyright law, its provisions (Louisiana License Act) were preempted (by the US Copyright Act) and Vault's license agreement was unenforceable.

== See also ==
- Vault Corp. v. Quaid Software Ltd.

== See also ==
- Vault Corp. v. Quaid Software Ltd.
