= ProCD, Inc. v. Zeidenberg =

1996 American appeals court ruling

ProCD v. Zeidenberg
- Court: United States Court of Appeals for the Seventh Circuit
- Full case name: ProCD, Inc. av. Matthew Zeidenberg and Silken Mountain Web Services, Inc.
- Decided: June 20, 1996
- Citations: 86 F.3d 1447; 65 USLW 2014; 1996 Copr. L. Dec. (CCH) ¶ 27,529; 39 U.S.P.Q.2d 1161; 29 U.C.C. Rep. Serv. 2d (West) 1109

Case history
- Prior history: 908 F. Supp. 640 (W.D. Wis. 1996)

Holding
- A shrink wrap license for a software product is an enforceable contract.

Court membership
- Judges sitting: John Louis Coffey, Joel Martin Flaum, Frank H. Easterbrook

Case opinions
- Majority: Easterbrook

Laws applied
- Uniform Commercial Code §§ 2-204, 2-206, 2-606

ProCD, Inc. v. Zeidenberg, 86 F.3d 1447 (7th Cir., 1996), was a court ruling at the United States Court of Appeals for the Seventh Circuit. The case is a significant precedent on the matter of the applicability of American contract law to new types of shrinkwrap licenses that arose with home computing and the Internet in the 1990s, and whether such licenses are enforceable contracts.

== Background ==
In the mid-1990s, Matthew Zeidenberg purchased a telephone directory database, SelectPhone, on a CD-ROM produced and sold by the company ProCD. That company had compiled information from over 3,000 local telephone directories, at a cost of more than $10 million, and sold the results to marketers and other interested persons. To recoup its costs, ProCD discriminated based on price by charging commercial users a higher price than it did to everyday, non-commercial users.

Zeidenberg started his own business called Silken Mountain Web Service in which he intended to sell categorized lists of phone numbers to marketers, and planned to copy phone numbers from the database that had been compiled by ProCD and sold via the SelectPhone package. Zeidenberg purchased a non-commercial copy of SelectPhone from a retail store. After opening the packaging and installing the software on his personal computer, Zeidenberg created a website and offered the information originally on the CD-ROM to his own customers for a fee that was less than what ProCD charged its commercial customers.

The CD-ROM package purchased by Zeidenberg included an external notice (within the shrink wrap that covered the box) that a license was enclosed within the package. Upon installing the software, he was presented with a notice on his computer screen describing the license agreement, which in turn required clicking a checkbox to show consent. This in turn is known as a clickwrap license. Another version of the license was available as a file on the CD-ROM.

ProCD filed suit against Zeidenberg for contract law violations, because the license included in the SelectPhone package forbade copying of the contents; ProCD argued that the shrinkwrap license was an enforceable contract. The case was first heard at the United States District Court for the Western District of Wisconsin.

== District court proceedings ==
ProCD argued at the district court that Zeidenberg violated its license by copying and reselling the contents of its SelectPhone CD-ROM. Zeidenberg argued that the shrinkwrap license was not a valid contract that could be enforced, because it merely hinted at hidden terms that could not be evaluated by the customer until after purchase. Zeidenberg also claimed that by trying to prohibit its users from copying phone numbers from its database, ProCD was violating copyright law because phone numbers are facts, and facts cannot be copyrighted.

The district court ruled that the buyer of a software package is not required to observe a shrinkwrap license because in this case, the message on the outside of the CD-ROM box (under the shrink wrap) only served as a notice that there was a contractual agreement inside, and did not constitute an enforceable contract in itself. Thus, the shrinkwrap license was not a contract and Zeidenberg had not committed a violation.

ProCD appealed this ruling to the United States Court of Appeals for the Seventh Circuit.

== Circuit court ruling ==
The Seventh Circuit reversed the lower court decision and ruled that a shrinkwrap license is in fact an enforceable contract. The circuit court held that while the message on the outside of the CD-ROM package was merely a notification of the full contract to be found inside, this did not force a purchase as Zeidenberg claimed. Instead, ProCD invited buyers to return the package to the retailer if they could not accept the terms of the agreement: "If you do not agree to the terms of this License, promptly return all copies of the software, listings that may have been exported, the discs and the User Guide to the place where you obtained it." The circuit court also held that Zeidenberg then had ample opportunity to review the license after opening the package, and indicated his acceptance of the agreement by clicking the relevant checkbox before he could begin using the SelectPhone software.

On Zeidenberg's copyright argument, the circuit court noted the 1991 Supreme Court precedent Feist Publications v. Rural Telephone Service, in which it was found that the information within a telephone directory (individual phone numbers) were facts that could not be copyrighted. For Zeidenberg's argument, the circuit court assumed that a database collecting the contents of one or more telephone directories was equally a collection of facts that could not be copyrighted. Thus, Zeidenberg's copyright argument was valid. However, this did not lead to a victory for Zeidenberg, because the circuit court held that copyright law does not take precedence over contract law. Since ProCD had made the investments in its business and its specific SelectPhone product, it could require customers to agree to its terms on how to use the product, including a prohibition on copying the information therein regardless of copyright protections.

Finally, the circuit court held that a shrinkwrap license, when used for a product that can be returned if the buyer disagrees with the larger agreement inside the package, constitutes a valid and enforceable contract. The court relied primarily on the Uniform Commercial Code (UCC) sections 2-204 (describing a valid contract) and 2-606 (describing the offering and acceptance of a contract). Zeidenberg had been offered the opportunity to read the license agreement inside the package and agree by continuing to use the software (which he had done), or to refuse by returning the package to the retailer. In particular, the circuit court noted that "the opportunity to return goods can be important" under the Uniform Commercial Code.

== Impact ==
The Seventh Circuit's ruling in ProCD, Inc. v. Zeidenberg was praised by the corporate community for confirming the applicability and enforceability of shrinkwrap licenses, which had been a rising trend at the time but without settled law. However, some pro-consumer commentators criticized the ruling's acceptance of a business model in which a consumer was required to buy a product and open it first, and then take additional steps to return the product to the retailer and seek a refund (which would be questionable with an opened and possibly damaged package) if they disagreed with the terms of the contract. The ruling also received some criticism, in agreement with Zeidenberg's argument, that ProCD intended to use contract law to indirectly enforce control over un-copyrightable facts such as phone numbers.

== See also ==
- Standard form contract
