= Software product liability =

Liability for software bugs

Software vendor liability is the issue of product liability for software bugs that cause harm, such as security bugs or bugs causing medical errors. For the most part, this liability does not exist in the United States. The possibility of liability is excluded for most software in the European Union Product Liability Directive 1985 but is explicitly provided for in the update issued in 2024.
