= Specht v. Netscape Communications Corp. =

American legal case

Specht v. Netscape
- Court: United States Court of Appeals for the Second Circuit
- Full case name: Specht v. Netscape Communications Corporation
- Argued: March 14, 2002
- Decided: October 1, 2002
- Citation: 306 F.3d 17

Case history
- Procedural history: Affirmed holding from 150 F. Supp. 2d 585 (S.D.N.Y. 2001)

Holding
- Software licenses are not enforceable if there is not reasonable notice of the existence of a license and unambiguous consent to those terms.

Court membership
- Judges sitting: Sonia Sotomayor, Joseph M. McLaughlin, Pierre N. Leval

Case opinions
- Majority: Sotomayor, joined by McLaughlin, Leval

Specht v. Netscape, 306 F.3d 17 (2d Cir. 2002), is a ruling at the United States Court of Appeals for the Second Circuit regarding the enforceability of clickwrap licenses under contract law. The court held that merely clicking on a download button does not show consent with license terms, if those terms were not conspicuous and if it was not explicit to the consumer that clicking meant agreeing to the license.

== Background ==
Christopher Specht and several co-plaintiffs were users of the Netscape web browser and related software that they had downloaded from the Internet. The plaintiffs argued that they had not been given an opportunity to review and possibly refuse all the End User License Agreements (EULAs) that came with the software. Upon reviewing the agreements later, they found that they disagreed with a stipulation that any legal disputes must go to arbitration rather to court, and with various stipulations that allowed Netscape to track user activity in ways that allegedly invaded privacy.

A software agreement to which a user assents by clicking a "yes" or "OK" button on the screen is known as a clickwrap license. Whether such a license was enforceable under contract law was unsettled at the time of this dispute.

All the plaintiffs acknowledged that they clicked "yes" when prompted to agree to the EULAs while downloading the Netscape web browsers, but claimed that there was no such prompt for the associated SmartDownload plug-in that facilitated the process, and that a button to indicate assent to that license could only be found by scrolling beyond the "download" button. The SmartDownload license contained the provisions about arbitration and data tracking to which the plaintiffs objected.

The plaintiffs brought suit at the United States District Court for the Southern District of New York against Netscape Communications Corporation, claiming that the terms of the EULAs enabled violations of the Electronic Communications Privacy Act and the Computer Fraud and Abuse Act, while the inability to review the EULAs before downloading the software was a violation of contract law. Meanwhile, Specht operated an online business in which he offered files to be downloaded by his customers. He claimed that Netscape tracked his customers' data via the SmartDownload process, while Netscape countered that Specht benefited financially from this process and had no valid objection to the SmartDownload functionality.

== District court proceedings ==
Netscape moved that the plaintiffs were prohibited from bringing the dispute to court, because of the very same EULAs being argued. According to Netscape, the plaintiffs had voluntarily agreed to the EULAs, including the provision requiring all legal disputes to go to arbitration, so therefore the present dispute should go to arbitration as well.

The district court denied Netscape's motion to dismiss the case. The court held that a contract becomes binding "when there is a meeting of the minds and consideration is exchanged." Since the plaintiffs were not given sufficient opportunity to review the arbitration clause in the SmartDownload EULA, Netscape could not compel that technique for resolving the present dispute. According to the court, the "plaintiffs neither received reasonable notice of the existence of the license terms nor manifested unambiguous assent to those terms before acting on the web page’s invitation to download the plug-in program."

The court also rejected Netscape's claim against Christopher Specht in particular, holding that any benefits that he received from the SmartDownload functionality were indirect and not sufficient for compelling arbitration.

Netscape, continuing to argue that the dispute with the defendants should be handled via arbitration, appealed the district court decision to the United States Court of Appeals for the Second Circuit.

== Circuit court ruling ==
The circuit court affirmed the lower court's decision, rejecting Netscape's argument that the dispute should go to arbitration, while ruling that the EULA requiring this method was not an enforceable contract. The crux of the issue was whether or not the plaintiffs agreed to be bound by the defendant's licensing terms when they downloaded the free plug-in; the plaintiffs could not have learned of the existence of the terms before downloading. The court found that "a reasonably prudent Internet user in circumstances such as these would not have known or learned of the existence of the license terms before responding to defendants’ invitation to download the free software, and that defendants therefore did not provide reasonable notice of the license terms."

The circuit court held further that a license agreement for SmartDownload was not included in the parallel agreement for the Netscape browser despite the fact that SmartDownload is meant to enhance the functioning of the browser. This means that when the plaintiffs clicked through the browser's license agreement, they were not agreeing to the SmartDownload agreement. Thus, the court ruled that a clickwrap license is invalid, and does not serve as an enforceable contract, if it does not present all necessary license information in an unambiguous way before downloading.

== Subsequent events ==
The immediate result of the circuit court ruling was that the dispute between the plaintiffs and Netscape could not be sent to arbitration, and the remaining factors in the dispute, including tracking of user data, would have to be heard in a full hearing at district court. The parties settled that dispute out of court, with Netscape agreeing to stop collecting data on the plaintiffs but with no admission of violations of the Electronic Communications Privacy Act.

After this ruling, Internet firms were required to make the presence of EULAs more evident before users were compelled to initiate the downloading process, while the users must be presented with an obvious process to review the terms of the agreement before making a decision to continue.
