= List of litigation involving the Electronic Frontier Foundation =

The Electronic Frontier Foundation is regularly involved in litigation. The following is a list of cases that have involved the EFF to some degree.

== Analog hole ==
- Macrovision v. Sima

== Anonymity ==
- Burd v. Cole
- Doe v. Cahill
- Dominick v. MySpace
- E. Van Cullens v. John Doe
- First Cash v. John Doe
- Fix Wilson Yard v. City of Chicago
- Manalapan v. Moskovitz
- Merkey v. Yahoo SCOX, Groklaw et al.
- Mobilisa v. Doe
- RIAA v. Verizon Case Archive
- USA Technologies v. Stokklerk

== Bloggers' rights ==
- Apple v. Does
- Barrett v. Rosenthal
- Eli Lilly Zyprexa Litigation
- Online Policy Group v. Diebold, Inc.
- Spocko and ABC/KSFO
- ALA v. FCC
- Coders' Rights Project
- Blizzard v. BNETD
- In Re: Matter of Search Warrant (Boston College)
- Lexmark v. Static Control Case Archive
- MBTA v. Anderson
- OdioWorks v Apple
- US v. ElcomSoft Sklyarov
- CyberSLAPP
- Ampex v. Cargle Case Archive
- Burd v. Cole
- E. Van Cullens v. John Doe
- First Cash v. John Doe
- Merkey v. Yahoo SCOX, Groklaw et al.
- Mobilisa v. Doe
- Naas v. Anonymizer et al.

== Digital rights management ==
- 2006 DMCA Rulemaking
- Macrovision v. Sima
- RealNetworks v. DVD-CCA (RealDVD case)
- Sony BMG Litigation Info
- United States v. Elcom Ltd.
- Macrovision v. Sima
- Paramount v. ReplayTV
- Digital Millennium Copyright Act
- Blizzard v. BNETD
- Chamber of Commerce v. Servin
- Lexmark v. Static Control Case Archive
- Macrovision v. Sima
- RealNetworks v. DVD-CCA (RealDVD case)
- RIAA v. Charter Communications Archive
- RIAA v. Verizon Case Archive
- StorageTek v. Custom Hardware
- DMCA Rulemaking
- 2000 DMCA Rulemaking
- 2003 DMCA Rulemaking
- 2006 DMCA Rulemaking
- 2009 DMCA Rulemaking
- E-Voting Rights
- Diebold v. North Carolina Board of Elections
- National Federation of the Blind v. Volusia County
- Online Policy Group v. Diebold
- Sarasota County Re-vote Filing
- White v. Blackwell: Creating True Verifiability in a Battleground State

== File sharing ==
- Aimster
- Arista Records LLC v. Lime Group LLC
- Atlantic v. Howell
- BUMA v Kazaa
- Capitol v. Foster
- Capitol v. Thomas
- Elektra v. Dennis
- Fonovisa v. Alvarez
- In re: Sony BMG Music Entertainment, et al.
- Interscope v. Leadbetter
- Lava v. Amurao
- MGM v. Grokster
- Napster Cases Archive
- RIAA v. Charter Communications Archive
- RIAA v. The People

== Free speech ==
- Abourezk v. ProBush.com
- ACLU v. Reno II
- Ampex v. Cargle Case Archive
- Apple v. Does
- Bank Julius Baer & Co v. Wikileaks
- Barrett v. Rosenthal
- Bauer v. Wikimedia et al
- Bernstein v. United States
- Burd v. Cole
- Chamber of Commerce v. Servin
- Chicago Auto Show SHUTDOWN
- CLC v. Craigslist
- Commonwealth of Kentucky v. 141 Internet Domain Names
- Diehl v. Crook
- Doe v. Cahill
- Dominick v. MySpace
- DontDateHimGirl.com
- E. Van Cullens v. John Doe
- eBay v. MercExchange
- EFF v. Global Equity (see SPEECH Act § Use in courts)
- Electric Slide Litigation
- Eli Lilly Zyprexa Litigation
- Embroidery Software Protection Coalition v. Ebert & Weaver
- First Cash v. John Doe
- Fix Wilson Yard v. City of Chicago
- Frankel v. Lyons (Barney)
- Fuller v. Doe
- Indymedia Server Takedown
- JibJab Media v. Ludlow Music ("This Land" Parody)
- Johnson v. Barras
- Junger v. Daley
- Landmark and the Internet Archive
- Long Haul v Regents of the University of California
- Medical Week News v. Sanofi-Aventis
- Merkey v. Yahoo SCOX, Groklaw et al.
- Mobilisa v. Doe
- MPAA v. The People
- Nitke v. Ashcroft
- OdioWorks v Apple
- Online Policy Group v. Diebold
- Request for Depublication of Novartis v. SHAC
- RIAA v. Verizon Case Archive
- Sapient v. Geller
- Savage v. Council on American-Islamic Relations
- Spocko and ABC/KSFO
- Steve Jackson Games v. Secret Service Case Archive
- Tiffany Inc. v. eBay, Inc.
- Williams v. Donald

== Hollywood v. DVD ==
- 2000 DMCA Rulemaking
- 2003 DMCA Rulemaking
- 2006 DMCA Rulemaking
- 2009 DMCA Rulemaking
- Macrovision v. Sima
- RealNetworks v. DVD CCA (RealDVD case)

== Innovation ==
- 20th Century Fox v. Cablevision
- Aimster
- Arista v. Lime Wire
- Blizzard v. BNETD
- eBay v. MercExchange
- Macrovision v. Sima
- OdioWorks v Apple
- Paramount v. ReplayTV
- Perfect 10 v. Google
- RealNetworks v. DVD-CCA (RealDVD case)
- US v. ASCAP

== Intellectual property ==
- 1-800 Contacts v. WhenU
- 20th Century Fox v. Cablevision
- ACRA v. Lexmark
- American Airlines v. Farechase Inc. Archive
- Arista v. Lime Wire
- Atlantic v. Howell
- Authors Guild v. Google
- Blackboard v. Hoffman
- Blake v. Google
- Blizzard v. BNETD
- Bowers v. Baystate
- Capitol v. Thomas
- Chamberlain Group, Inc. v. Skylink Technologies, Inc.
- Chicago Auto Show SHUTDOWN
- Columbia v. Bunnell
- CoStar v. LoopNet
- Diehl v. Crook
- Echostar v. Freetech
- Electric Slide Litigation
- Elektra v. Barker
- Embroidery Software Protection Coalition v. Ebert & Weaver
- Frankel v. Lyons (Barney)
- Gatehouse Media Massachusetts I, Inc. v. The New York Times Co.
- Huntsman v. Soderbergh
- J.K. Harris v. Taxes.com Litigation
- JibJab Media v. Ludlow Music ("This Land" Parody)
- Kelly v. Arriba Soft
- KSR v. Teleflex
- Landmark and the Internet Archive
- Lava v. Amurao
- Lexmark v. Static Control Case Archive
- Macrovision v. Sima
- Marvel v. NCSoft
- Medical Week News v. Sanofi-Aventis
- MGM v. Grokster
- MPAA v. The People
- Napster Cases Archive
- OdioWorks v Apple
- Online Policy Group v. Diebold
- Perfect 10 v. Google
- Quanta v. LG
- RealNetworks v. DVD-CCA (RealDVD case)
- RIAA v. Charter Communications Archive
- RIAA v. The People
- Righthaven LLC v. Democratic Underground
- Sapient v. Geller
- Snow v. DirecTV
- StorageTek v. Custom Hardware
- The Betamax Case
- Tiffany v. eBay
- UMG v. Augusto
- US v. ASCAP
- Visa v. JSL Corporation
- Green v. Department of Justice

== Locational privacy ==
- US v Jones

== No Downtime for Free Speech campaign ==
- Chamber of Commerce v. Servin
- Chicago Auto Show SHUTDOWN
- Diehl v. Crook
- Discover Communications and the Spankmaker
- Electric Slide Litigation
- Embroidery Software Protection Coalition v. Ebert & Weaver
- Frankel v. Lyons (Barney)
- Jones Day v Blockshopper
- Landmark and the Internet Archive
- Lenz v. Universal
- Medical Week News v. Sanofi-Aventis
- MoveOn, Brave New Films v. Viacom
- OdioWorks v Apple
- Online Policy Group v. Diebold
- Sapient v. Geller
- Savage v. Council on American-Islamic Relations
- SHARK v. PRCA
- Tiffany v. eBay
- USP v. Durkee

== NSA spying ==
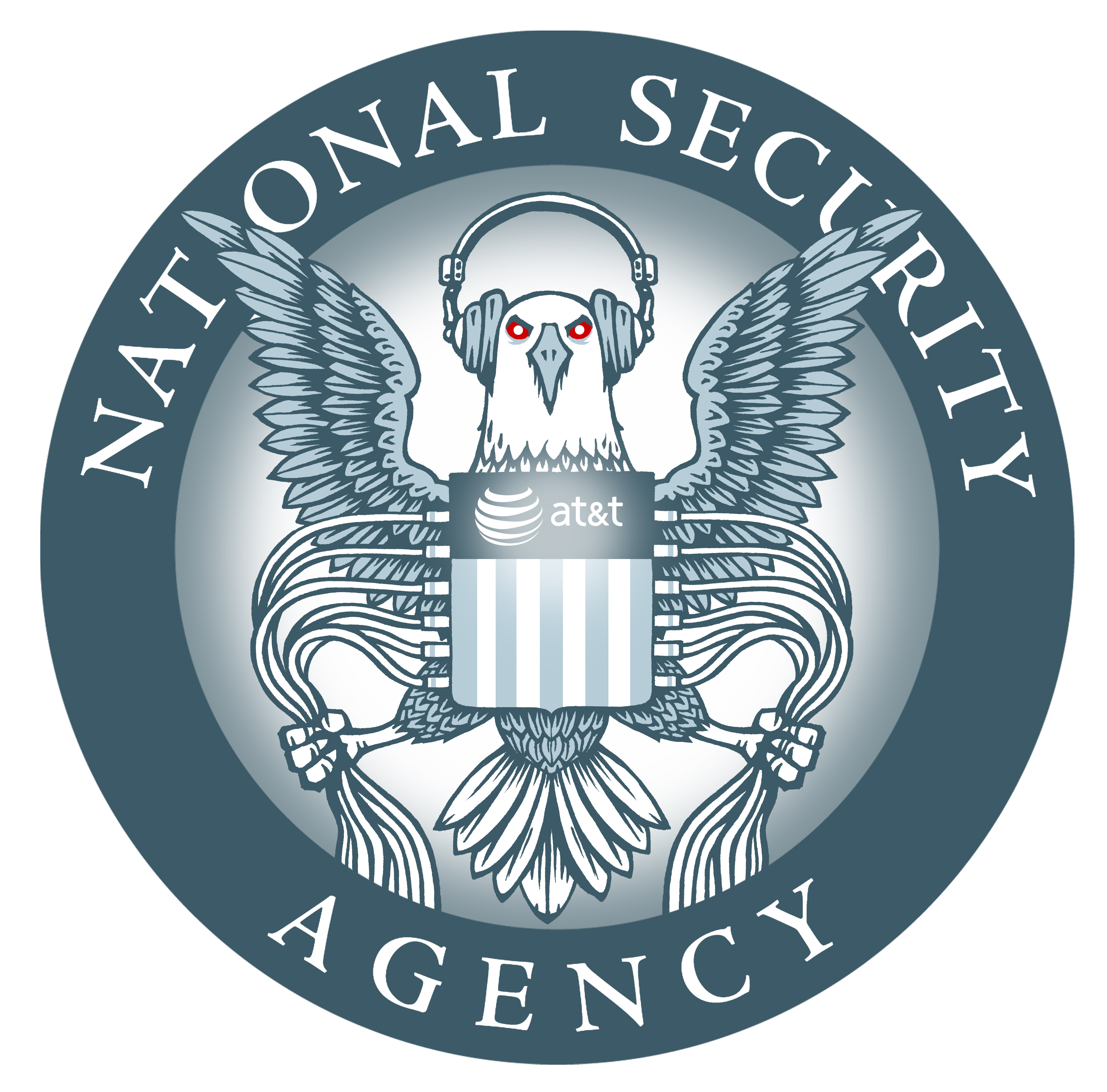
EFF's version of the NSA logo, representing Jewel v. NSA

- Al-Haramain v. Bush
- CCR v Bush
- First Unitarian Church of Los Angeles v. NSA
- Hepting v. AT&T
- Jewel v. NSA
- NSA Multi-District Litigation
- NSA Spying - State Administrator Cases
- Shubert v Bush
- Verizon / MCI

== Patents ==
- eBay v. MercExchange
- In re Bilski
- KSR v. Teleflex
- Merck v. Integra
- Quanta v. LG
- PATRIOT Act
- Doe v. Mukasey (Doe v. Gonzalez, Doe v. Ashcroft)

== Privacy ==
- Authors Guild v. Google
- AutoDesk v. ODA
- Bernstein v. United States
- Bunnell v. MPAA
- Burd v. Cole
- Columbia v. Bunnell
- Doe v. Mukasey (Doe v. Gonzalez, Doe v. Ashcroft)
- Echostar v. Freetech
- In Re: Matter of Search Warrant (Boston College)
- Internet Archive et al v Mukasey et al
- Junger v. Daley
- Long Haul v Regents of the University of California
- NSA Multi-District Litigation
- US v Jones
- US v. Arnold
- US v. Councilman
- US v. Ropp
- Warshak v. United States
- Warshak v. USA
- Terms Of (Ab)Use
- Sony BMG Litigation Info
- UMG v. Augusto
- US v. Drew

== Travel screening ==
- United States v. Arnold

== Uncategorized ==
- Clement v. California
- Newmark, et al., v. Turner Broadcasting System, Inc. et al.

== Historical/miscellaneous cases ==
- 2600 Mall Case
- AA v. Farechase
- AlScan v. RemarQ
- American Amusement v. Kendrick
- Autodesk v. Oda
- Avrahami v. USNWR
- BITS Against the Empire & Spunk Press
- Blackboard v. Hoffman
- CMU Censorship
- CRLP v. DOJ
- Laurence Canter and Martha Siegel
- Cincinnati BBSers v. Hamilton County
- Clue v. InterNIC
- Compuserve v. Patterson
- DAETC v. FCC
- DCI v. InterNIC
- DISC v. InterNIC
- DOJ v. Microsoft
- Davis Case
- Dennis Watson Case
- Doe v. SEPTA
- Doe v. MySpace Decision
- DoubleClick Cases
- EFGA v. GA
- FBI v. Tucholka Tri Tac
- FCC v. Pacifica
- Ford v. Lane
- Fred Cherry v. DOJ
- Giacalone v. InterNic
- Gilmore v. NSA
- Hollis-Eden v. Wells
- Intel v. Schwartz Convicted in 1995 of cracking passwords
- United States v. Baker the U. of Michigan and the FBI
- Knowledgenet v. InterNIC et al
- Konop v. Hawaiian Airlines
- LaMacchia
- Lotus Cases
- Loudon Library
- MTV v. Curry
- Medinex v. Awe2bad4mdnx
- Montreal BBSes
- Multnomah Library v. US
- PGP & Phil Zimmermann
- PROFS (Armstrong v. Exec. Offc. of the President)
- Phiber Optik
- RIAA v. Diamond
- Roadrunner v. InterNIC
- Rural Metro v. Doe
- Scientology Cases
- Sheehan v. Experian
- Smithsonian
- Stratton, Oakmont, Porush v. Prodigy
- Toys 'R' Us v. Roadkills-R-Us
- US v. Thomases
- USTA v. FCC

== See also ==
- List of litigation involving the Wikimedia Foundation
