= Jason Fernandes =

Indian blockchain entrepreneur

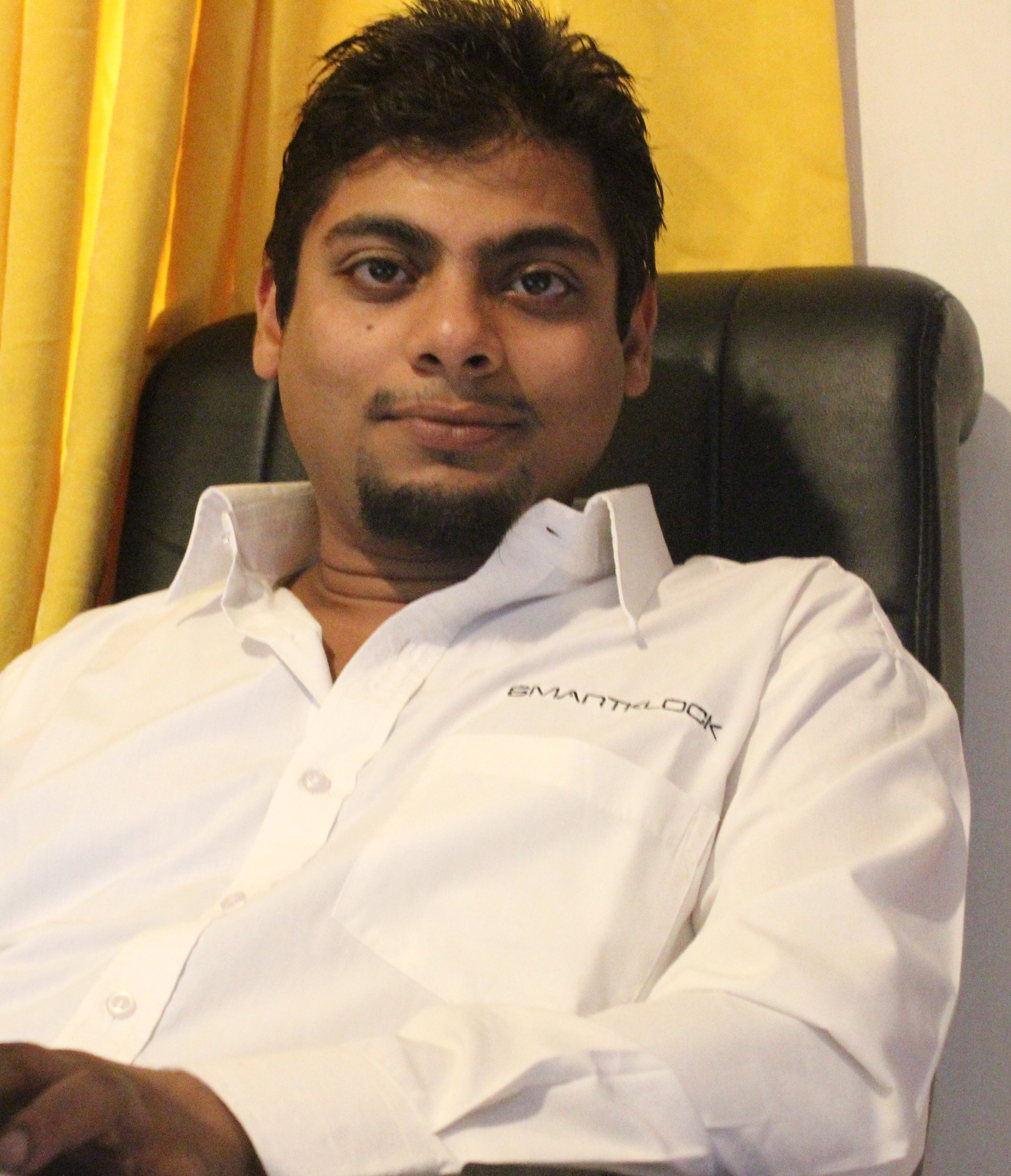
- Education: University of Texas at Austin
- Occupations: Entrepreneur; financial advisor; writer
- Known for: Blockchain, Internet of Things
- Relatives: Carlos Nicholas Fernandes (brother)
- Website: www.jasonfernandes.com

Jason Fernandes is Web3 entrepreneur, Investor, and technology columnist hailing from Goa. Fernandes is the co-founder of AdLunam Inc.a Web3 investment platform. As a teenager, Fernandes founded the internet portal ZeoCities.com, the non-profit LDKids.org and wrote for CHIP Magazine. Later, while studying at the University of Texas, Austin, Fernandes co-invented the Internet-based DVR, InstantTV, and was part of the founding team at PerceptiveI (a company that developed ECRM software for Fortune 500 companies). Fernandes was a monthly technology columnist for GlobeAsia Magazine, Indonesia for 5 years producing over 60 columns over this period. Fernandes is often quoted in Web3 publications and has spoken at TEDx events.

== Early life ==
Jason Fernandes was born in Bombay (now known as Mumbai) to artists Thomas and Jeanette Fernandes. Fernandes was a teenager when he was diagnosed with dyslexia. It was then that he was given access to the family computer, which started his journey into technology.

== Career ==
=== Teenage years ===
In 1998, Fernandes bought his first website domain, www.jasonsoftware.com, which later became ZeoCities.com: a web portal offering free email, websites, search engine, news, and chat. He also became a writer and technology troubleshooter for one of India’s most widely read computer publications, CHIP Magazine (christened Dr. Chip). In 1999, Fernandes created Learning Disabled Kids, a non-profit website, as a way of helping others better understand dyslexia, dysgraphia, dyscalculia, attention deficit disorder and other learning disabilities. For this, in 1999, he was awarded the Childnet International Award (UK).

=== College years ===
Fernandes moved to the United States to study at the University of Texas, Austin. While studying there, he was among the founding members of RecordTV.com (now known as InstantTV), where he holds a patent for a Network DVR; he also part of the founding team of PerceptiveI, a company that developed patented ECRM software for Fortune 500 clients like Eastman Chemical Asia Pacific, Great Eastern Life .

=== Return to India and subsequent career ===
After completing his education, Fernandes moved back to India, residing in Goa. He then started working as a technology columnist for Indonesia’s GlobeAsia Magazine. Over the years, his writings have appeared in The Jakarta Globe, CHIP, DNA India, The Goan and Man's World Magazine, among others.

Fernandes helped develop SmartKlock, a "smart" clock that gave its users only important notifications. For this product, he ran a Kickstarter campaign. Eager to hear more opinions on it, he wrote to Steve Wozniak in September 2014. Wozniak replied with an encouraging note and an autographed photograph of the Apple co-founders sitting with the Apple I prototype. This venture slowly grew into FUNL Corp, which offers an app designed to block out unnecessary notifications, with a reward-based system (working on blockchain). Along with Vadim Fedotov and Gene Hoffman, Fernandes also co-founded Malta-based AET Ventures (AEToken).

Fernandes has advised the country of Barbados, the Government of Goa, and multiple Goan political parties on IT and Education policy. He was a speaker at TEDxPanaji in 2017, keynote speaker at the International Blockchain Congress, and has been a featured speaker at events hosted by the Computer Society of India, Goa Chamber of Commerce and Industry (GCCI), Goa University, BITS Pilani University, Goa Engineering College and 91Springboard.

=== Blockchain and Cryptocurrency ===
In November 2017, Fernandes founded blockchain startup FUNL Corp, a platform that “filters notifications using a social blocking approach making real-time intelligent decisions on whether to block or let a notification through to your phone based on data executed from other users”. Later, Fernandes co-founded a blockchain based payment solution for the affiliate marketing industry (built on the Ethereum blockchain as a side chain), called Affiliate Economy Token or AEToken. In October 2018, AEToken won the competition for the best ICO pitch at the Malta Blockchain Summit.

In December 2018, Fernandes became a biweekly guest on Malta’s BloxliveTV, for his opinion on cryptocurrency. He has since appeared on their "Crypto Now" and the "New On The Block" shows. In March 2019, they profiled Fernandes on their show "Be Influenced", which highlights people in the blockchain industry.

In 2019, Fernandes decided to launch his own channel, TokenJay.TV, which promotes people in the blockchain industry and working in other technologies that promote sustainability.

In 2021 AdLunam Inc. was co founded by Jason Fernandes, Nadja Bester and Lawrence C Hutson and was incorporated in the British Virgin Islands. Serving as a Launchpad and Accelerator for projects that mint tokens leading to a public offering called an IDO (Initial Dex Offering). It raised USD 1 Million Dollars in 24 hours and completed raising USD 2 Million dollars in 5 days successfully closing its funding round.

Recently He was also profiled in Fortune India 40 under 40 magazine edition.

Fernandes often speaks on the subjects of cryptocurrency and blockchain at conferences and seminars. He has been a Keynote speaker at a Blockchain seminar at Padre Conceição College of Engineering (PCCE) in 2018. and has also taken the stage at the World Blockchain Summit 2023 in Dubai & Bangkok, WoW Summit Hong Kong, Tech Circus Event London UK, World Fintech Summit Singapore, Web 3 Carnival Bangalore among others. Jason Fernandes has also hosted the podcast, Diving Into Crypto.

== Awards and Accolades ==
Fernandes has been awarded the Seaside Startup Summit 2018 Award, Startup@Singapore Award, the First National Technopreneurship competition Award (Singapore), "Best Business Plan" award from Sybase at the Global Entrepreneurs Challenge at Stanford University, California, the Childnet International Award (UK) in 1999 and in 2000 he was featured on Rediff.com's "Achiever Track". In 2015, he won the Asian Scientist Writing Prize, for his piece entitled Moore’s Law and Evolution: How non-biological evolution made Charles Darwin irrelevant, which focused on how evolution has been far outpaced by non-biological evolution and the age of the cyborg. He also holds a patent for a Network DVR. In 2019, he was awarded the Karmaveer Chakra Award.

He was awarded the Goa Entrepreneurship award in 2023 for Innovation in Blockchain technology. In March 2023 his company, AdLunam Inc. was awarded with the BOLD awards in 2 categories, BOLDEST NFT and BOLDEST Crowd Funding. In the same year The Times of India Awards North, awarded AdLunam Inc. for Excellence in Innovative Crypto / NFT.
