= Network DVR =

Network DVR (NDVR), or network personal video recorder (NPVR), or remote storage digital video recorder (RS-DVR) is a network-based digital video recorder (DVR) stored at the provider's central location rather than at the consumer's private home. Traditionally, media content was stored in a subscriber's set-top box hard drive, but with NDVR the service provider owns a large number of servers, on which the subscribers' media content is stored. The term RS-DVR is used by Cablevision for their version of this technology.

== Overview ==
NDVR is a consumer service where real-time broadcast television is captured in the network on a server allowing the end user to access the recorded programs at will, rather than being tied to the broadcast schedule. The NDVR system provides time-shifted viewing of broadcast programs, allowing subscribers to record and watch programs at their convenience, without the requirement of a local PVR device. It can be considered as a "PVR that is built into the network".

NDVR subscribers can choose from the programmes available in the network-based library, when they want, without needing yet another device or remote control. However, many people would still prefer to have their own PVR device, as it would allow them to choose exactly what they want to record. Local PVR bypasses the strict rights and licensing regulations, as well as other limitations, that often prevent the network itself from providing "on demand" access to certain programmes.

In contrast, RS-DVR (Remote Storage Digital Video Recorder) refers to a service where a subscriber can record a program and store it on the network. A stored program is only available to the person who recorded it. Should any two persons record the same program, it must for legal reasons be recorded and stored as separate copies. Essentially implementing a traditional DVR with network based storage.

In Greece, On Telecoms offers an NPVR service to all subscribers in their basic package with all the programming of all major national Greek TV channels for the last 72 hours. The user has to sign in their contract that they agree that the company will record national programming of the last 72 hours for them so that they can get around any legal implications (like the ones mentioned in the NPVR article) as this service would work like a personal PVR.

== Cablevision litigation in the U.S. ==
After Cablevision announced the RS-DVR in March 2006, several content providers including 20th Century Fox, Universal Studios, and Walt Disney sued Cablevision in federal district court. The content providers sought a permanent injunction that would effectively prevent Cablevision from implementing the system. The content providers prevailed at the district court level, and Cablevision appealed. On August 5, 2008, the 2nd U.S. Circuit Court of Appeals, in Cartoon Network, LP v. CSC Holdings, Inc., reversed the lower court decision that found the use of RS-DVRs in violation of copyright law. It agreed with Cablevision's argument that a RS-DVR should be treated essentially the same as a customer owned DVR. Only the location of the DVR really differs.

Certain content providers began the process of appealing to the U.S. Supreme Court, seeking cert in late 2008. The Supreme Court delayed hearing the case and instead referred it to the United States Solicitor General's office for the federal government's opinion on the case. In June 2009 the US Supreme Court refused to hear a final appeal in the Cablevision remote DVR case, thereby bringing the years-long litigation to a close.

== Future of RS-DVRs ==
As the Cablevision litigation had a favorable outcome, the future looks bright for RS-DVR systems. Many major U.S. cable companies are expected to implement their own RS-DVR systems, as RS-DVRs allow wider access to DVRs at a lesser cost to subscribers and innovative new methods of advertising that appeal to advertisers.

NDVRs have been launched in countries like Hong Kong (Now TV), Singapore (recordTV.com), Italy (Vcast - Faucet PVR), Germany (shift.tv), Finland (tvkaista.fi), Lithuania (teo.lt) and other European countries.

While Cablevision provided an RS-DVR that allowed an in-home set-top-box to remotely record a TV show, Cloud DVRs required no such in-home technology infrastructure. As such, Cloud DVRs (that have not sought licenses from broadcasters) have been challenged and have had mixed results in various jurisdictions, as analysed by the law firm Olswang.

== Litigation against RecordTV.com's Cloud DVR ==
Cloud DVRs were launched in numerous countries but were inevitably challenged in court. In Singapore, RecordTV.com became the first Cloud DVR in the world to be declared legal in a landmark lawsuit where RecordTV.com, led by its CEO, Carlos Nicholas Fernandes who fought Singapore's state owned broadcaster, MediaCorp. MediaCorp was represented by Drew and Napier CEO and Senior Counsel, Davinder Singh who cross-examined Carlos Fernandes over 3.5 days during the trial. RecordTV.com lost the lawsuit in the High Court of Singapore, only to have the ruling overturned at the Court of Appeals where the Court ruled in favour of RecordTV and awarded costs and damages. The litigation was declared to be a David vs. Goliath battle, by the Business Times, the main business newspaper owned by the Singapore Press Holdings. Carlos Nicholas Fernandes was subsequently named as a Young Global Leader at the World Economic Forum. The case has become one of the most seminal cases in copyright law. William F. Patry and David Post both well known legal scholars in the area of copyright wrote about the case on their respective blogs prior to the appeal. The ruling was even cited at WIPO.

== See also ==
- Digital video recorder
- Cablevision
- RecordTV.com
