= InstantTV =

- Developer: Carlos Nicholas Fernandes
- Release: July 1, 2007; 19 years ago

InstantTV is a cloud software digital video recorder (DVR) operated by RecordTV Pte Ltd based in Singapore. The company was founded by Carlos Nicholas Fernandes in 2007 and previously offered services as RecordTV.com.

== History ==
RecordTV.com was originally a US-based company that provided cloud-based recording of any and all cable TV channels its founder, David Simon, had subscribed to, by any user on the Internet. The MPAA sued Simon for copyright infringement. Simon initially hired Ira Rothken to defend against the litigation, but eventually gave up, settled and decided to sell its assets.

=== Launch in Singapore ===
Fernandes purchased the assets of RecordTV.com from Simon, but then invented (and patented) "A System and Method for recording television and/or radio programmes via the Internet". Among other things, the RecordTV.com service was restricted to Singapore users alone and users were able to record only Singapore Free-to-Air content, which was broadcast by Singapore's state-owned broadcaster, MediaCorp. Shortly thereafter, on 24 July 2017 and 27 September 2017, RecordTV.com received two cease and desist letters alleging infringement by MediaCorp.

=== RecordTV Pte Ltd vs. MediaCorp litigation ===
RecordTV Pte Ltd refused to comply with the demand to shut down its website. After the first cease and desist letter from MediaCorp, RecordTV's lawyers wrote back, alleging that MediaCorp's move was "calculated to stifle innovation and the growth of a new industry" according to an article by Singapore Press Holdings that was republished. After the second, September cease and desist letter was received, RecordTV preemptively sued MediaCorp for groundless threats of copyright infringement proceedings, claimed S$30.5 million in damages and continued to operate its website.

One of the core legal issues that arose was whether RecordTV.com was recording content on behalf of its users or whether the users were using RecordTV.com to record TV shows they would otherwise be entitled to see. This was significant because the case would turn on the identity of the party making the copy – if it was the consumer, it could be considered for time-shifting and domestic use and therefore legal. If it was the company, then, the company was recording it for commercial use and therefore illegal. Thus, the case would turn based on the identity of the party making the copy. MediaCorp was represented by Drew and Napier CEO and Senior Counsel Davinder Singh, who cross-examined RecordTV CEO Fernandes over 3.5 days during the trial. RecordTV lost the lawsuit in the High Court of Singapore.

In the initial, adverse judgment against RecordTV, Justice Ang of the High Court cited copyright law specialist William Patry. Following the judgment, Patry stated that in his view Justice Ang had erred in a blog post called the "Singaporean Cablevision case", where he asserted that the court had misread the Cablevision ruling and should have found in favour or RecordTV. David Post, a legal scholar and co-author of an amicus curiae brief in support of Cablevision, also indicated through his writings that the court should have found in favour of RecordTV.

RecordTV chose to appeal the ruling. In its ruling, at the onset, the Court of Appeals set out the importance of the case for society:

This appeal raises an important policy issue as to how the courts should interpret copyright legislation in the light of technological advances which have clear legitimate and beneficial uses for the public, but which may be circumscribed or stymied by expansive claims of existing copyright owners. Bearing in mind that the law strives to encourage both creativity and innovation for the common good, in a case such as the present one, how should the courts strike a just and fair balance between the interests of all affected stakeholders, viz, consumers, content providers as well as technology and service vendors? If the law is not clear as to whether the use of improved technology which is beneficial to society constitutes a breach of copyright, should the courts interpret legislative provisions to favour the private rights of the copyright owner or the public’s wider interests? This is the problem that we face and have to resolve in the present case. In the normal course of events, when enacting a statute, the Legislature balances the rights and interests of all affected stakeholders after considering the social costs and the economic implications. Where the statute is not clear, however, the courts have to perform this difficult task.

The Court of Appeals ruled in favour of RecordTV, awarded costs and damages and issued an injunction against MediaCorp from issuing further threats against RecordTV. In reversing the ruling of the lower court, the Court of Appeals summarised its conclusion:

To summarise our observations: in the present case, RecordTV’s iDVR service represents a significant technological improvement over existing recording methods and facilitates the more convenient enjoyment of television viewing rights by those Registered Users living in Singapore who hold valid television licences. RecordTV’s iDVR is simply a technological advance that is not addressed by the Copyright Act in the context of the copyright owner’s exclusive right to copy (ie, reproduce), communicate to the public and authorise the copying and/or the communication to the public of copyright-protected material. Since RecordTV was doing no more than making it more convenient for the aforesaid Registered Users to enjoy the MediaCorp shows (which was something that these Registered Users were entitled to do as MediaCorp had licensed them to view those shows), we are of the view that the public interest is better served by encouraging rather than stifling the use of RecordTV’s novel technology, especially given that MediaCorp has apparently not suffered any loss from RecordTV’s provision of an additional and better time-shifting service to Registered Users who are licensed to view the MediaCorp shows.

Following the victory, ZDNET quoted Fernandes as saying,

"We are delighted by the ruling. After over three years of litigation, it is clear that MediaCorp's threats were unjustified. Today is a great day for entrepreneurs, consumers and innovators."

The litigation was described as a "David vs. Goliath" battle that came to "its familiar conclusion", on the front page of the Business Times newspaper. Fernandes was subsequently named Young Global Leader by the World Economic Forum.

=== Relaunch ===
As a result of the initial adverse ruling in the High Court, RecordTV had shut down its website. Following the reversal by the Court of Appeals, RecordTV relaunched the website. In October 2014, RecordTV launched an app called InstantTV that targeted the global market, including free channels for Thailand, Japan, Indonesia, United States and United Kingdom markets. The facility to record and play Singapore channels persisted, although it continued to be geographically restricted to Singapore IP addresses. The InstantTV app on the Android Play Store went from 10,000 installs on 4 November 2014 to 100,000 installs - a 1000% increase by 3 August 2015, in 7 months.

== See also ==
- Digital video recorder
- Cablevision
- Mediacorp
