= Shari Steele =

Technologist, lawyer, and digital rights activist

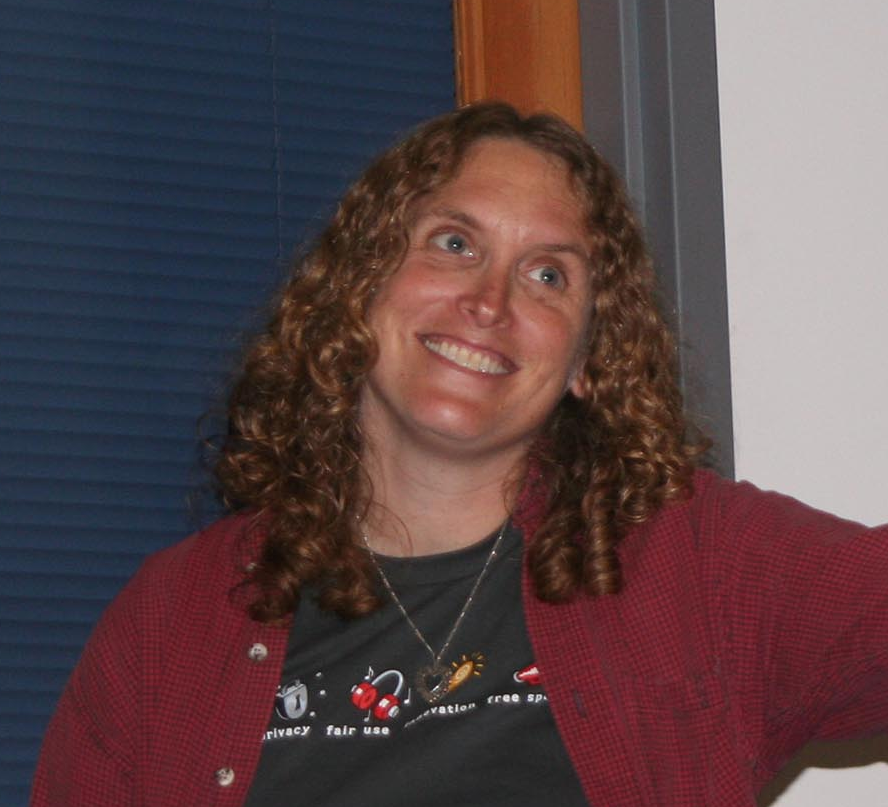
- Education: Widener University School of Law (J.D.); Georgetown University Law Center (LL.M.); West Chester University (M.S.)
- Employers: Electronic Frontier Foundation (1992–2015); The Tor Project (2015–2019)
- Known for: Digital rights activism
- Spouse: Bill Vass

Shari Steele is a technologist, lawyer, and activist for digital freedom. She worked for the Electronic Frontier Foundation as the legal director and then executive director, as well as at The Tor Project as the executive director.

== Career ==
Steele joined the Electronic Frontier Foundation (EFF) as a staff attorney in 1992. She later became the legal director, a position she held for eight years before she became the EFF's executive director in 2000. Steele helped to grow the EFF from a small team of lawyers to a much larger organization known for its involvement in legal disputes involving digital rights, including challenges to broad digital surveillance practices by the National Security Agency (NSA) and to the United States government's use of National Security Letters.

Although she had intended to retire when she left the EFF, she instead decided to take a position as the executive director of the Tor Project in 2015, which she held until the end of 2019. She is known for her work at The Tor Project to make the organization more inclusive, as well as for guiding the organization through a major scandal involving accusations of sexual assault against Jacob Appelbaum, a Tor employee and activist.

== Life and education ==
Steele earned her law degree from Widener University School of Law. She later earned an LL.M. degree from Georgetown University Law Center, where she also worked as a teaching fellow. Steele also has a master's degree in Instructional Media, which she earned from West Chester University.

Steele is married to Bill Vass, the vice president of engineering at Amazon Web Services.
