= Arguendo =

Latin legal term

Arguendo is a Latin legal term meaning for the sake of argument. "Assuming, arguendo, that ..." and similar phrases are used in courtroom settings, academic legal settings, and occasionally in other domains, to designate provisional and unendorsed assumptions that will be made at the beginning of an argument in order to explore their implications.

== Etymology ==
The Latin word arguendō is the ablative case of the gerund of the verb arguere, which means 'assert' or 'clarify'. The English word argue is derived from the same Latin verb.

== Usage ==
Assuming arguendo allows an attorney to examine the conclusions of premises without admitting that these premises—often the asserted facts of the opposing party—could be true.

A criminal defense attorney may say, "if, arguendo, my client stole the car, then saving a life would have justified stealing it," thus suggesting that determining the client's guilt or innocence is pointless because they would cause identical legal effects.

Particularly in an appellate court, a judge may ask an attorney what the effects of a different set of assumptions, made arguendo, about the facts governing a situation might be. Asking these questions is especially useful in exploring whether different fact patterns might limit the proper scope of a possible holding in a given case.

For a real example in a civil case, see Tiffany and Company's Reply Brief, Tiffany Inc. v. eBay, Inc., 08-3947-CV (U.S. Court of Appeals for the 2nd Circuit 2008, p. 23, second paragraph): "In any event, assuming arguendo that requiring eBay to take remedial measures would impair eBay's business, that fact cannot relieve eBay of its legal obligations."
