= Rights management =

Rights management may mean:

- Digital rights management, access control technologies for copyright works
- Performing rights management
