= Bowers v. Baystate Technologies, Inc. =

Bowers v. Baystate Technologies
- Court: United States Court of Appeals for the Federal Circuit
- Full case name: Harold L. Bowers (doing business as HLB Technology) v. Baystate Technologies, Inc.,
- Decided: January 29, 2003
- Citation: 320 F.3d 1317

Holding
- Baystate performed a breach of contract by reverse engineering HLB Technology's software. The shrinkwrap license on HLB Technology's software preempts fair use rights given in copyright law.

Court membership
- Judges sitting: Randall Ray Rader, Raymond Charles Clevenger, Timothy Belcher Dyk

Case opinions
- Majority: Randall Ray Rader
- Dissent: Timothy Belcher Dyk

Laws applied
- 17 U.S.C. § 117

Keywords
- Patent infringement; Copyright infringement; Breach of contract

Bowers v. Baystate Technologies, 320 F.3d 1317 (Fed. Cir. 2003), was a U.S. Court of Appeals Federal Circuit case involving Harold L. Bowers (doing business as HLB Technology) and Baystate Technologies over patent infringement, copyright infringement, and breach of contract. In the case, the court found that Baystate had breached their contract by reverse engineering Bower's program, something expressly prohibited by a shrink wrap license that Baystate entered into upon purchasing a copy of Bower's software. This case is notable for establishing that license agreements can preempt fair use rights as well as expand the rights of copyright holders beyond those codified in US federal law.

== Background ==
Baystate Technologies, Inc ("Baystate") and HLB Technology ("Bowers") were competing companies which created add-ons that interacted with a computer-aided design (CAD) program known as CADKEY.

Bowers was the patent holder of a system called Cadjet that simplified interfacing with CAD software, which he began to license commercially in 1989. Bower's initial software offering was later combined with a product, called Geodraft, that was produced by George W. Ford III (Ford) and inserted tolerances compliant with ANSI for features in a CAD design. Together, the products were marketed as Designer's Toolkit, which was sold with a shrink-wrap license that prohibited reverse engineering.

Baystate sold competing CADKEY tools including Draft-Pak version 1 and 2. According to the court filings, Baystate acquired a copy of Bowers' Designer's Toolkit, and three months later, Baystate released Version 3 of Draft-Pak, which substantially overlapped with the features offered by Designer's Toolkit.

In 1991, Baystate sued Bowers and sought a declaratory judgement that Baystate's products did not infringe on Bowers' patent, the patent was invalid, and the patent was unenforceable. Bowers filed counterclaims for copyright infringement, patent infringement, and breach of contract and contended that Baystate had reverse engineered Designer's Toolkit.

At court, expert testimonial revealed "evidence of extensive and unusual similarities" between Draft-Pak and Designer's Toolkit and supported supporting Bowers's claim that Baystate had reverse engineered a copy of his software. The District Court of Massachusetts concluded that Bowers was entitled to damages and found that the shrink wrap license tied to Bowers's software preempted any fair use case for reverse engineering as allowed by Copyright law. Baystate appealed the district courts decision.

== Opinions of Federal Circuit ==
The central question the Federal Court addressed was whether a shrink-wrap license that forbids reverse engineering was preempted by federal copyright law, which expressly permits reverse engineering.

=== Majority opinion ===
The majority opinion of the Federal Court upheld that parties can freely enter into license agreements that enforce stricter requirements than copyright and that such agreements are not preempted by copyright law. In its decision, the court cited a number of prior cases involving contractual constraints that extend copyright law:

- Data General v. Grumman demonstrated that state laws protecting trade secrets were not preempted by copyright law even though both deal with unlawful copying. Specifically, the federal court stated that "beyond mere copying, that state law claim required proof of a trade secret and breach of a duty of confidentiality." The additional terms result in a unique requirement that is not covered by copyright law and thus not preempted.
- ProCD v. Zeidenberg determined that materials that could not be protected by copyright could be protected by a shrinkwrap license if the actions restricted by the license were not "equivalent to any of the exclusive rights within the general scope of copyright." As contracts affect only the involved parties, no new exclusive (universal) rights are created for the copyright holder.
- Although Atari v. Nintendo established reverse engineering was a fair use exception to copyright infringement, it did not conflict with an additional contract disallowing reverse engineering.
- In the Federal Court's own interpretation, Vault v. Quaid found that state law was preempted by copyright law, but it does not apply to a private contractual agreement.

=== Dissenting opinion ===
A dissenting opinion was entered by Judge Dyk agreeing with all decisions except that a copyright law does not preempt a state contract.

Dyk formed his argument using patent and copyright law cases:

- Cases establishing the rights of patent law were viewed as applicable toward copyright law. Bonito Boats v. Thunder Craft Boats defined that state law does not preempt patent rights.
- Data General v. Grumman and ProCD v. Zeidenberg both focused on "extra elements" added by state contract law that were not covered by copyright law.
- Atari v. Nintendo demonstrates the importance of the fair use defense in copyright law to ensure that copyright law did not inhibit understanding of an idea, process, or method of operation.
- Vault v. Quaid established that state law could not be used to preempt copyright law. Dyk agreed that a private agreement could be used to preempt copyright law, but a shrinkwrap license is similar to a state law because the customer does not have an opportunity to renegotiate the license agreement.
- Dyk created an analogy of a state law where software disallowing reverse engineering must have a black dot on the packaging. That analogy demonstrated a law that would give broader protections than those normally given in copyright law, which impedes publicly-given rights.
- By allowing preemption of copyright law, Dyk questioned other limitations that could be applied to federal law. He also warned that it could undermine the protections that had originally been given in the Copyright Act.

== Criticism ==
Critics scrutinized the outcome and argued that it not only allows companies to use state contract law to expand copyright protections but also creates non-negotiated license terms, which are equivalent to patent-like protection without the limiting conditions of patent law.

Critics further argued that the precedent is unrealistic for the software industry. Reverse engineering is considered necessary to be to keep up with "feature wars," such as the issue in this case, and it is also essential for interoperability and security purposes.

== See also ==
- Bnetd
- Copyright Act of 1976
- Reverse Engineering
- Software License Agreement
