= Battle.net =

Online gaming platform by Blizzard Entertainment

- Battle.net running on Windows 11
- Developer: Blizzard Entertainment
- Release: January 1997; 29 years ago
- Stable release: 2.3.1.13029
- Platform: Windows; macOS; iOS; Android
- Type: Content delivery Digital rights management Multiplayer online service Social networking Instant messaging VoIP
- License: Proprietary
- Website: battle.net
- ASN: 57976

Battle.net is an Internet-based online game, social networking service, digital distribution, and digital rights management platform developed by Blizzard Entertainment. The service was launched in January 1997 in conjunction with the release of Blizzard's action-role-playing video game Diablo. Battle.net was officially renamed to "Blizzard Battle.net" in August 2017, with the change being reverted in January 2021.

Blizzard Entertainment officially unveiled the revamped Battle.net 2.0 on March 20, 2009. It later revealed further details of the Battle.net revamped features at BlizzCon 2009 which supported World of Warcraft, StarCraft II, and Diablo III. The original Battle.net was then renamed to Battle.net Classic. Battle.net Classic games use a different account system to the games on Battle.net 2.0.

The platform currently supports storefront actions, social interactions, and matchmaking for all of Blizzard's modern PC games including Hearthstone, Heroes of the Storm, Overwatch 2, and StarCraft: Remastered, as well as various Call of Duty games, and Crash Bandicoot 4: It's About Time from corporate sibling of Blizzard Entertainment, Activision. The platform provides cross-game instant messaging and voice chat service.

In September 2017, Blizzard Entertainment released the Battle.net application for Android and iOS. The app includes the ability to chat with and add friends in addition to seeing what games they are currently playing.

== History ==
=== Battle.net Classic (1997–2009) ===
When the service initially launched in January 1997 (the first game using the service being Diablo), Battle.net offered only a few basic services like chatting and game listings. Players could connect to the service, talk with other gamers and join multiplayer games of Diablo. Besides user account data, no game data was stored on the Battle.net servers. When a player connected to a game, they would be connecting directly to the other players in the game. No data was sent through the Battle.net servers. While this made the service quick and easy to use, it quickly led to widespread cheating since players using cheats could modify their game data locally. However, since there was an option to create private games, many players ended up playing with people they knew.

The Battle.net interface in StarCraft

The release of StarCraft in 1998 increased usage of the Battle.net service significantly. Features such as ladder ranking and game filters were added to the service. Battle.net grew even larger after the release of the expansion pack StarCraft: Brood War, with tens of thousands of players logged on at any given time (even in the present day). StarCraft Battle.net was especially successful in South Korea, where the number of players logged on was often many times that of the United States.

StarCraft also brought with it a new copy protection scheme using CD keys. Under Diablo, Battle.net would allow any client to connect to the service. With StarCraft, only those players with a valid and unique CD key – a generated 13-digit number distributed with each boxed game – were allowed onto the service. Only one person could connect to Battle.net using a specific CD key at a time. CD-Keys could also be muted (unable to chat in channels or whisper), voided (restricted to The Void channel), jailed (both muted and voided) or banned from Battle.net entirely. Every Blizzard game since StarCraft has used the CD key system to connect to Battle.net. StarCraft: Brood War used as its CD-key whatever CD-key was found on the original StarCraft on that computer, and was thus only installable if the original was already installed. With the release of the Gateway system in Brood War (selectable regional server clusters), two players can play at the same time, as long as they are on different gateways. Given how the gateways are expectedly separate from each other, each with their own games list and user accounts that are not shared across the other gateways, it is still maintained that they cannot play in the same game nor chat with each other, etc.

Diablo II was released in 2000 to much fanfare. The main highlight of Diablo II as it relates to Battle.net was that the game used the client–server model. The game was no longer simulated on each player's computer, but instead was run on Blizzard's server. This also meant that all of the character data for the game was stored on the Battle.net servers. The game also has an open character feature on Battle.net which stored the player's character on the client. This allowed players to play characters locally or on a LAN, and then use those same characters on Battle.net. However, any open games played on Battle.net were not protected from cheating by other players since they could have modified their characters locally. Diablo II also had a unique feature that would show the players in the Battle.net chat room as avatars who looked like their characters did in the game. It also used a different Battle.net interface than previous games, where previously there were mainly only color differences. There was also expanded ladder support including a "Hardcore" ladder which listed players whose characters would be removed permanently if they died in-game. Again, with Diablo II usage of Battle.net increased steadily, climbing even higher with the release of the expansion pack Diablo II: Lord of Destruction in 2001.

Warcraft III: Reign of Chaos was released in 2002 and its expansion pack, Warcraft III: The Frozen Throne, was released in 2003. The release of these two games brought with them a number of new features to the online service. The most significant feature to be added was probably the concept of Anonymous Matchmaking. This feature allowed a user who wanted to play a game to simply press a button and automatically be matched up with one or more other players who were similar in skill (based on ranking) and also wanted to play a game. This allowed for people to get into games quickly and easily. It also reduced win-trading, where two people would purposely win and lose games to artificially raise their rank on the ladder. The matchmaking concept was also expanded to team games in a feature called "Arranged Teams". In an arranged team game, you could make a team with one or more friends, which was then anonymously matched up with another team of the same size and rank. However, a strategy was introduced on how to cheat the automated 'fair' matchups, called 'Abusing', simply by someone losing the Arranged Team Games intentionally with one ally so that with another ally (who wants to gain wins easily) won't find it difficult because the automatic matchups would put the two players up against relatively unskilled players. Automated tournaments were added in the expansion, where players would compete to be crowned tournament champion in a series of games played throughout the day. In addition to the new game styles, a slew of other features were added including selectable chatroom icons unlocked based on the player's number of wins, a friends list, and clan support.

=== Battle.net 2.0 (2009–2013) ===
Battle.net was revamped by Blizzard Entertainment in 2009 and officially unveiled on March 20, 2009, it was further elaborated on during BlizzCon 2009. The new Battle.net contains three unique sections. The first allows players to connect all Battle.net accounts, World of Warcraft characters and friends list together and integrate them into a unified single Battle.net account. Players can also unlock achievements in-game which would in turn unlock avatars and decals which would be shown on the player's profile, the decals can also be seen in-game on the player's units.

Chat System interface on the revamped Battle.net 2.0

The second section consists of making Battle.net into a competitive platform for players which involves a new improved matchmaking system, simplifying the process of players organizing games. The ladder system has also been revamped; the system classifies players into certain leagues according to their level of competitiveness. Players would then compete against others who have a similar skill level to their own, albeit across leagues. There is also a special practice league to practice and hone skills, where game speed is reduced and maps are designed to create a slower pace of the game. The party system works similar to that of World of Warcraft where players with friends would join and enter games as a party.

The final section involves the new chat system which involves a new system similar to instant messaging across games. Players may communicate with friends across games, servers, and characters.

World of Warcraft initially did not support Battle.net, having separate accounts from Battle.net once until the revamp of Battle.net on March 20, 2009, which forced players to merge their World of Warcraft accounts with the new Battle.net accounts. The features of Battle.net utilized in World of Warcraft include allowing players to engage in cross-realm, cross-faction and cross-game chat, which allows players to talk with their friends on their Real ID friends list, from other factions, other servers as well as other games such as StarCraft II and Diablo III. On November 11, 2009, Blizzard Entertainment made Battle.net a mandatory feature for World of Warcraft players.

StarCraft II was the first game to natively support the new revamped Battle.net online interface. It was split into three installments: the base game with the subtitle Wings of Liberty, expansion pack Heart of the Swarm, stand-alone expansion pack Legacy of the Void and downloadable content mission packs Nova Covert Ops.

The new interface includes a chat service which is similar to that of instant messengers which allows players to interact across different games. The platform also supports VoIP for players.

On May 5, 2010, Blizzard revealed that Battle.net 2.0 would be integrated with social networking site Facebook, "linking the world's premier online gaming platform with the world's most popular social platform".

=== Desktop and Mobile Apps (2013–2017) ===
In August 2013, Blizzard Entertainment released an open beta for the Battle.net Launcher. The launcher is a desktop application that allows players to purchase, install and patch their games, and provides access to the friends list and messaging. It also provides access to some account management and game services. Blizzard launches its own cross-game voice chat service in October 2016. Blizzard Voice is integrated into the Battle.net application.

In February 2017, Blizzard introduced the ability to obtain Blizzard storefront credit by trading in "WoW Tokens" from World of Warcraft, bought through the use of in-game gold and initially used as a means of trading credits between players of World of Warcraft. These credits could be used to purchase other Blizzard games or content, such as card packs for Hearthstone or loot boxes for Overwatch.

The Windows version of Destiny 2, developed by Bungie and published by the corporate sibling of Blizzard Entertainment, Activision, was exclusively sold and launched through the Battle.net on its Windows release on October 24, 2017, as well as used to support the game's matchmaking capabilities, making it the first non-Blizzard game supported by the launcher. Blizzard affirmed that players can use gold farming in World of Warcraft to generate credit towards their Blizzard account that they can use towards purchase of Destiny 2. Blizzard said that they are also "potentially evaluating needs or opportunities for future Activision games" to be supported by the Battle.net; with Call of Duty: Black Ops 4, scheduled for release in late 2018, as its second title for the service. Blizzard said it does not plan to extend similar support to other third-parties, fearing it would weaken their quality control with the product.

Destiny 2 was removed from Battle.net on October 1, 2019, after Bungie and Activision amicably terminated the publishing deal, with Bungie transitioning players to use Steam instead after that date.

A major user interface update for Battle.net was issued in January 2021, aimed to provide better visibility of news and a user's friends list, accessibility features, and navigation features.

In September 2017, Blizzard Entertainment released Battle.net application for Android and iOS. The app provides simple social networking features with a user's friends on Battle.net, including accepting and sending friend invitations and chatting with friends.

=== Rebranding and ongoing development (2017–2025) ===
In late 2016, Blizzard Entertainment announced plans to rebrand Battle.net. According to CEO Mike Morhaime, the company found themselves in a position where they had two competing brands - Blizzard and Battle.net - creating confusion for players of where to find information about their games, and wanted to consolidate the branding. Their first step was a plan to retire the "Battle.net" name in favor of calling service "Blizzard Tech", announced on September 21, 2016, and renaming the client as the "Blizzard App" by March 24, 2017. However, following this change, Blizzard realized that the "Battle.net" brand had too much legacy behind it to let it go since dropping the brand created additional confusion for users. This further became an issue when Blizzard sought to have Destiny 2 use the service, as they wanted to be clear that the game was not developed by Blizzard but used the Battle.net framework, but the "Blizzard App" branding would not provide that clarity. By August 2017, Blizzard Entertainment stepped back from the full rebranding, and announced that going forward, they would call the service and application "Blizzard Battle.net", which Morhaime said was the best way they had found to combine both brands and minimize consumer confusion. By February 2021, Blizzard Entertainment released a new interface and rebranded the application "Battle.net" to its original name.

Blizzard announced it intends to bring some of their PC games to Steam, starting with Overwatch 2 in August 2023. Games on Steam will still require a Battle.net account but will not need the launcher app. Blizzard stated the reasoning for the move was that "[O]ne of the ideas pushing us forward is meeting players around the world where they are and making our games as easy as possible to access and play. We want to give everyone a chance to experience our universes with old friends while making new ones, no matter how they choose to play."

=== Expansion Beyond Blizzard Titles (2025-Present) ===
On February 18, 2025, Avowed developed by Obsidian Entertainment became the first game published by Xbox Game Studios to be made available on Battle.net, this comes after the Acquisition of Activision Blizzard by Microsoft. On May 15, 2025, Doom: The Dark Ages developed by id Software was the first game published by Bethesda Softworks to launch on Battle.net. Blizzard Entertainment and CD Projekt RED has announced on August 25, 2026, that The Witcher 3: Wild Hunt Remastered will be made available on Battle.net when it launches on September 29, 2026. CD Projekt RED at Blizzcon 2026 has announced that Cyberpunk 2077 will be launching on Battle.net in 2026.

== Development ==
=== Security ===
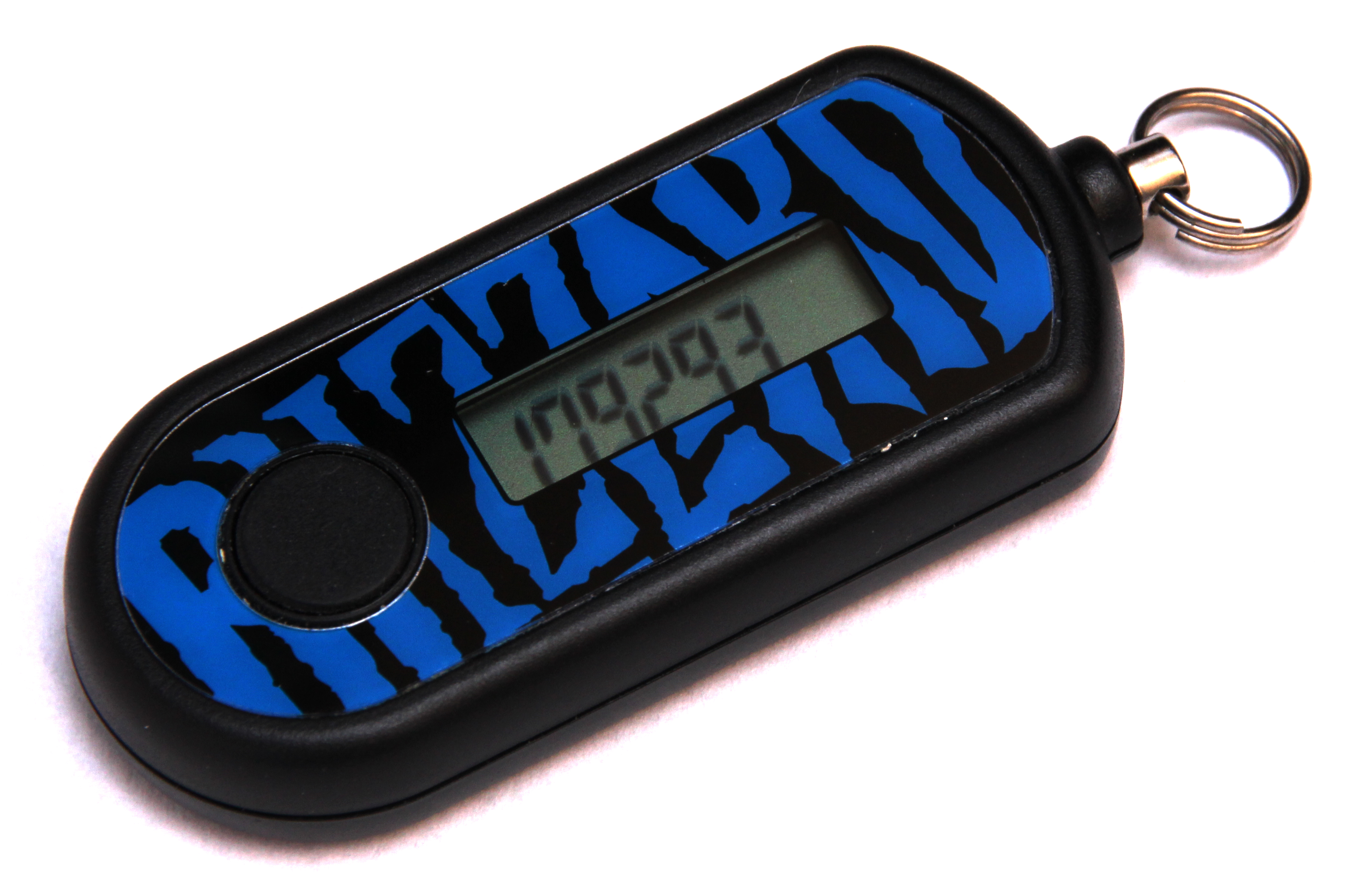
Hardware authenticator for the Battle.net

To help users protect their Battle.net accounts, Blizzard Entertainment implemented a two-factor authentication option for the service. Launched in 2008, this was initially through a separate device that could be purchased from Blizzard, encoded with the user's credentials. The device fit on a keychain and would generate pseudorandom numbers linked to the player's account, which they would enter when logging into Battle.net to affirm their identity. Later, Blizzard introduced the Battle.net mobile application for iOS and Android platforms in 2009, replicating the same functionality. An update during June 2016 simplified the process, allowing the user, when logging into their Battle.net account from a computer, to simply press a single button on their connected mobile device to affirm their authenticity. Though not required to use Battle.net, some game aspects require the user to enable two-factor authentication through either the device or mobile app.

=== Growth history ===
By November 1997, Blizzard Entertainment claimed that Battle.net had 2.2 million games played, 1.25 million different users, and averaged 3,500 new users each day. By April 1999, it was reported that Battle.net had 2.3 million active users, and more than 50,000 concurrent users. By September 2002, their active user count had jumped to 11 million. By September 2004, their active user count was up to nearly 12 million, spending more than 2.1 million hours online each day, and they had an average of 200,000 concurrent users, with a peak concurrent user count of 400,000. In 2006, Blizzard claimed that Battle.net, when combined with the World of Warcraft subscriber base, was a leader of online gaming, noting that "even Xbox Live is not even close to us".

=== Community content ===
A community of developers has arisen around Battle.net. Many unofficial clients are available for Battle.net, and most of the protocol used by Battle.net-enabled games has been reverse-engineered and published by volunteers.

Also, several communication tools have been made, like a "whisper" tool, so that a player could talk to their friends even if they are in a game.

Custom games (using maps that were not made by Blizzard Entertainment) have helped build the community and now are a substantial portion of the games played. Among the most popular of these games in Warcraft III are tower defense maps and "hero solo" maps (such as Defense of the Ancients, and arena maps) or pure RTS games like "Civilization Wars", where the player develops their economy, tech, and unit diversity but the player has no control of their units.

== Controversy ==
=== bnetd ===
A group of gamers reverse engineered the network protocol used by Battle.net and Blizzard games, and released a free (under the GNU GPL) Battle.net emulation package called bnetd. With bnetd, a gamer is not required to use the official Battle.net servers to play Blizzard games.

In February 2002, lawyers retained by Blizzard Entertainment threatened legal action under the Digital Millennium Copyright Act (DMCA) against the developers of bnetd. Blizzard games are designed to operate online exclusively with a set of Blizzard-controlled servers collectively known as "Battle.net". Battle.net servers include a CD key check as a means of preventing software piracy.

Despite offers from the bnetd developers to integrate Blizzard's CD key checking system into bnetd, Blizzard claims that the public availability of any such software package facilitates piracy, and moved to have the bnetd project shut down under provisions of the DMCA. As this case is one of the first major test cases for the DMCA, the Electronic Frontier Foundation became involved. For a while negotiations were ongoing to resolve the case without a trial. However, the negotiations failed and Blizzard won the case on all counts: the defendants were ruled to have breached both StarCraft's End User License Agreement (EULA) and the Terms of Use of Battle.net. This decision was appealed to the Eighth Circuit Court of Appeals, which also ruled in favor of Blizzard Entertainment/Vivendi on September 1, 2005.

=== Privacy and Real ID ===
On July 6, 2010, Blizzard Entertainment announced that they planned to change the way their forums worked to require that users identify themselves with their real name. The reaction from the community was overwhelmingly negative with multiple game magazines calling the change "foolhardy" and an "Epic Fail". It also resulted in the largest user response ever on the Blizzard forums. This included personal details of a Blizzard employee who gave his real name "to show it wasn't a big deal". Shortly after revealing his real name, personal information was posted that included his phone number, picture, age, home address, and other details.

Some technology media outlets suggested the change was a good idea and would benefit both Battle.net and the Blizzard community. Others worried that Blizzard would open their fans up to real-life dangers such as stalking, sexual predators, and employment issues, since a simple Google search by a user's employer would reveal their online activities. There was also concern that this would lead to real-life harassment and safety concerns, especially for women and transgender gamers who are already harassed quite often in-game.

Blizzard Entertainment initially responded to some of the concerns by saying that the changes would not be retroactive to previous posts, that parents could set up the system so that minors cannot post, and that posting to the forums is optional. However, due to the huge negative response, Blizzard President Michael Morhaime issued a statement rescinding the plan to use real names on Blizzard's forums for the time being.

=== 2012 hacking ===
During 2012, Blizzard Entertainment suffered a number of incidents related to security. In May 2012, shortly after Diablo III's launch, they discovered a number of accounts that had been hacked using traditional means through password knowledge, with affected game characters being stripped of in-game possessions that could be sold for money. Blizzard noted at this time that those accounts affected did not use their authentication option, and made changes to try to improve security, such as the above authentication requirement for the game's Auction House. A few months later on August 4, 2012, Blizzard reported that their Battle.net servers had been hacked into, with the perpetrators gaining access to some personal information, including user e-mail addresses, answers to security questions, and scrambled passwords, but not enough for user accounts to be compromised, according to Blizzard. Blizzard Entertainment required all players on Battle.net in North America to change their password and suggested all users change their security questions.

These security breaches led to a class-action lawsuit against Blizzard Entertainment in November 2012, claiming that the company was making a profit from the sale of Authenticator devices rather than using the money to enhance the security of their own servers, and that they failed to notify affected users about the August data breach in a timely manner. Most of the claims in the suit were summarily dismissed in favor of Blizzard Entertainment in July 2013, primarily as the plaintiffs could not show any harm they suffered from these breaches, and the remaining claims related to Battle.net Authenticator promotional claims were resolved through mediation. The case was ultimately closed in February 2014.

== Games by Battle.net version ==
An early model of the revamped Battle.net interface in World of Warcraft

=== Battle.net Classic ===
- Diablo
- Warcraft II: Battle.net Edition
- Diablo II (Lord of Destruction)
- StarCraft (Brood War)

==== Restricted chat functionality ====
- Diablo Shareware
- Diablo Spawn
- Diablo
- StarCraft Shareware
- StarCraft Spawn
- Japanese StarCraft (public beta of a Japanese version of StarCraft)
- Japanese StarCraft Spawn

=== Battle.net 2.0 ===
- World of Warcraft (The Burning Crusade, Wrath of the Lich King, Cataclysm, Mists of Pandaria, Warlords of Draenor, Legion, Battle for Azeroth, Shadowlands, Dragonflight, The War Within and Midnight)
- Warcraft III: Reforged
- StarCraft II: Wings of Liberty (Heart of the Swarm and Legacy of the Void)
- StarCraft: Remastered
- Diablo IV
- Diablo Immortal
- Diablo III (Reaper of Souls)
- Diablo II: Resurrected
- Hearthstone
- Heroes of the Storm
- Overwatch 2
- Blizzard Arcade Collection (The Lost Vikings, Rock n' Roll Racing, Blackthorne, The Lost Vikings 2, and RPM Racing)
- Call of Duty: Black Ops 4
- Call of Duty: Modern Warfare (Warzone)
- Call of Duty: Modern Warfare 2 Campaign Remastered
- Call of Duty: Black Ops Cold War
- Call of Duty: Vanguard
- Call of Duty: Modern Warfare II (Warzone 2.0)
- Crash Bandicoot 4: It's About Time
- Call of Duty: Modern Warfare III
- Call of Duty: Black Ops 6
- Avowed
- Doom: The Dark Ages
- The Outer Worlds 2
- Sea of Thieves
- The Witcher 3: Wild Hunt Remastered

==== No longer available ====
- Overwatch
- Destiny 2
- Warcraft III: Reign of Chaos (The Frozen Throne)

== See also ==
- PvPGN
