= Carlos Nicholas Fernandes =

Indian entrepreneur (born 1976)

- Born: 1976 (age 49–50); Bombay, Maharashtra, India
- Education: Booth School of Business, University of Chicago and University of Bombay
- Occupation: Entrepreneur
- Known for: RecordTV.com, Network DVR
- Relatives: Jason Fernandes (brother)

Carlos Nicholas Fernandes (born 1976) is an inventor, founder and CEO of InstantTV, a service that offers Cloud DVR.

== Early life ==
Fernandes was born in Mumbai. Fernandes started his first business when he was 12, selling water purifiers door-to-door. He went on to study Electrical Engineering from Bombay University, and completed an MBA from Chicago University.

== Career ==
=== Initial years ===
Fernandes moved to Singapore in 1998 and joined the Information Technology Institute (ITI) (later known as Kent Ridge Digital Labs and currently known as the Institute of Infocomm Research), which is a government research institute run by Singapore's Agency for Science Technology and Research. In 1999, he joined a startup called Ecquaria Technologies, where he developed and marketed software. Ecquaria had been founded by people who had previously been associated with Kent Ridge Digital Labs.

==== PerceptiveI ====
Fernandes founded PerceptiveI, a company that offered enterprise software solutions, in 2000. The technology used in this company won many awards, both for Fernandes and the company. For his work, Fernandes was recognized by David Lim, the then Singaporean Minister for Information, Communications, and the Arts in 2003.

==== RecordTV ====
Fernandes purchased the assets of RecordTV.com, and added in technology that he had invented and patented in 2006 (along with Varsha Jagdale), in a way that would not violate the rights of copyright owners. This allowed RecordTV users to legally record TV shows, something which the original company had been sued for by the MPAA. Later, the service was renamed to InstantTV and launched its own app.

=== Current pursuits ===
==== Blaze ====
In 2017, Fernandes launched Blaze, an AI-based conversational news bot (chatbot) that was enhanced through human curation, in India. It is accessible through Facebook Messenger. As of 2018, he was working on the fake news problem.

== RecordTV vs MediaCorp litigation ==
Fernandes got into legal trouble in 2008 after MediaCorp alleged that RecordTV was using technology that violated copyright laws. Fernandes refused to shut down his company, and instead preemptively sued MediaCorp for groundless threats. He then claimed millions in damages and continued to operate its website. He even won the appeal, after MediaCorp decided to take the case further.

== See also ==
- InstantTV
- World Economic Forum
- Young Global Leaders
