= Performing rights =

Right to perform music in public

Performing rights are the right to perform music in public. It is part of copyright law and demands payment to the music's composer/lyricist and publisher (with the royalties generally split 50/50 between the two). Performances are considered "public" if they take place in a public place and the audience is outside of a normal circle of friends and family, such as at concerts, nightclubs, or restaurants, though some exceptions to this exist in the U.S. Public performance also includes broadcast and cable television, radio, and any other transmitted performance of a live song.

Permission to publicly perform a song must be obtained from the copyright holder or a collective rights organization.

== By region ==
=== United States ===
In the United States, broadcasters can pay for their use of music in one of two ways: they can obtain permission/license directly from the music's copyright owner (usually the publisher), or they can obtain a license from ASCAP, BMI, SESAC, or Global Music Rights to use all of the music in their repertoires. ASCAP, BMI, SESAC, and Global Music Rights are four performing rights societies in the U.S., and once they receive payment from the broadcasters they are responsible for compensating the music authors and publisher.

The U.S. public performance right corresponds to two exclusive rights under the Berne Convention: the right to perform the work in public, and the right to communicate the work to the public via transmission.

==== Statutory definitions ====
The primary provisions governing the performing rights of the copyright owner are given under subsections 4 and 6 of § 106 of the Copyright Act of 1976. § 106 lists the exclusive rights held by the owner of copyright and subsections 4, 6 lists out the specific protected works that the owner can publicly perform. Subsection 6 was added in 1996 in order to allow owners of sound recordings the exclusive right to perform their work publicly. Before 1996, the owners of copyright in sound recordings did not enjoy any rights of public performance but after the amendment a limited right of public performance by means of a digital audio transmission was granted to sound recordings.

§ 101 of the Act explains that a work is performed when the work is recited, rendered, played, danced, or acted, either directly or by means of any device or process. The definition gets broader in the case of a motion picture or other audiovisual work where a work is performed when its images are shown in any sequence or when the sounds accompanying the work are audible. Due to the very broad definition of "perform" virtually every rendition of the copyrighted work would constitute a performance. In addition to the capricious definition, performances of musical compositions and the underlying sound recordings must be noted separately. Each time a rendition of a musical work is performed, the sound recording that embodies that rendition is also performed-except, of course, when the musical work is being recorded for the first time. The distinction between the musical performance and the sound recording is important because the copyrights may be held by different parties and therefore governed by different rules.

To restrict this very wide right, only copyright owners have the right to perform their work publicly, but private performances are exempt from infringement. Though not providing a specific definition of "public" § 101 of the Act defines public performance in two ways:

Public Place Clause
This approach is based on the intuitive meaning of the word 'public'. Under § 101, is performance is public when it is made to a gathering of a substantial number of people who are outside the performer's circle of family and friends. So, a restaurant playing a song on its radio, which can be heard by the patrons eating food, would constitute a public performance.
Transmission Clause
A performance is also public when it is transmitted or communicated through any device or process to members of the public regardless of whether the public in question receive the performance in a single place and time, i.e., a transmission received by the public separately and individually would also constitute a public performance. Thus, a radio station transmitting a protected work through airwaves or analog waves or cable companies transmitting the protected works through cable directly into a person's home or any individual broadcasting the work on the internet would constitute a public performance under § 101.

==== The CableVision Ruling ====
In the case of Cartoon Network, LP v. CSC Holdings, Inc., 536 F.3d 121 (2d Cir. 2008), a consortium of copyright holders including Turner Broadcasting, 20th Century Fox, Paramount Pictures and Disney along with their subsidiaries sued Cablevision for its "Remote DVR" technology which allowed people to pause, record, replay and rewind previously stored content. The plaintiff challenged this new technology on three grounds.

1. That even the brief retention of the slices of the protected work in the Broadband Media Router buffer infringed on the plaintiff's right to reproduce the work.
2. That the copies saved on the Cablevision hard drive also constituted an infringement on the plaintiff's right to reproduce the work.
3. That the transmission of the copyrighted work from the Cablevision servers to their customers infringed on their right to public performance of the work.

The Court of Appeal reversed the finding of the Trial Court and decided in Cablevision's favor. While rejecting the third contention raised by the plaintiff the court assumed for the sake of its argument that Cablevision was indeed responsible for the transmission. The Court observed that even though for the customer the Remote DVR worked the same way a set top DVR does, there existed a crucial difference in the two. Instead of sending signals from the remote control to an on-set box, the viewer sends signals through the cable to the Cablevision servers, which then deliver the program to the subscriber's home. So the Court believed that the Remote DVR more closely resembled a video-on-demand service, whereby a cable subscriber uses their cable box to request transmission of content, such as a movie, stored on computers at the cable company's facility. But unlike users of a video-on-demand service, Remote DVR users can only play content that they previously requested to be recorded. The Court ruled that since each subscriber would necessarily have to make their own unique copy of the work while requesting it, the transmission of that unique work would only be delivered to one person at a time. Only if Cablevision transmitted the work to multiple subscribers from the same exact copy would the work infringe upon the right of the owners to publicly perform the work. Thus, the clinching point in the case was that each subscriber had to create their own personal copy of the copyrighted work. This fact was also emphasized by the solicitor general when advising the Supreme Court not to review the decision.

=== India ===
Section 13 of The Copyright Act, 1957 states that a copyright is allowed to exist in the following classes of works: (a) original literary, dramatic, musical and artistic works; (b) cinematograph films; and (c) sound recordings.

Section 2(d) of the Act defines the meaning of "author" of the work. According to section 2(d) (ii), the composer shall be the "author" of a musical work. However, sections 2(d)(v) and 2(d)(vi) were added to the Act by virtue of the 1994 amendment, according to which an author shall also be producer of the cinematograph film or sound recording; or "the person who causes the work to be created" when the literary, dramatic, musical or artistic work is computer-generated.

Section 17 deems the author of a work to be the "first owner" of the underlying copyright, subject to certain exceptions. The crux of these exceptions is that whenever an author creates a work during the course of employment of another, the employer (and not the author) will own the copyright unless there is a contract to the contrary. Section 14 of the Act accords certain rights in respect of owners of copyrighted works – the right of public performance (or communication to the public) being one of them. Section 14(a)(iii) allows the a literary, dramatic or musical work to be performed in public, or communicated to the public. Section 14(c)(ii) confers a similar right of communication to the public for artistic works, while sections 14(d)(iii) and 14(e)(iii) confer this right on cinematograph films and sound recordings respectively.

A recorded song would typically have 3 copyrights. The 'musical work' is the musical melody, harmony and rhythm, and the 'literary work' is the accompanying lyrics. The composer of the musical work is deemed to be the 'author' of the musical work and the person penning the lyrics in deemed to be the 'author' of the literary work. The third 'work' is the 'sound recording' which is created when the musical work and the literary work are recorded onto a fixed medium. The producer responsible for the recording is deemed to be the 'author' of the sound recording. Each of these works would be allowed their own separate set of rights (the right of public performance being one of them) under the Copyright Act, regardless of one work being created for another by virtue of an agreement. Therefore, even when a producer has engaged an artist to write a song, the producer's copyright only extends to the song itself (referred to as a 'synchronisation right'), and not the underlying lyrics, harmony, melody and rhythm – the rights for which would still vest with the original authors.

Section 13(4) of the Copyright Act recognizes the fact that a 'sound-recording' incorporated in a cinematograph film can continue to have an individual copyright, separate and distinct from the copyright in the cinematograph film. Similarly, this provision also recognizes that a musical work and literary work incorporated in a 'sound-recording' can have individual copyrights that are distinct from the copyright in the sound recording. Therefore, the law recognizes each category of works as a separate property right that is protected by itself despite being incorporated into another work. Thus, the composer of a musical work or the author of a literary work can continue to maintain copyright in their works despite licensing the same to the producer for the creation of a 'sound-recording'. The same stands true for a 'sound recording' that is incorporated into a cinematograph film.

However, the Supreme Court has ignored the ambit of section 13(4) in the past, specifically with regard to public performance. In Indian Performing Rights Society v Eastern Indian Motion Pictures Association & Ors., it was held that once the author of a lyric or a musical work parts with their portion of their copyright by authorizing a film producer to incorporate it in a cinematographic film, the producer acquires the exclusive right of performing the work in public, without having to secure any further permission of the author of the musical work or lyric. The Court ignored the idea contained in section 13(4), that authors of musical works retain an independent right of public performance even after licensing the same for incorporation in a film. The Court merely relied on the text of section 17, holding that in the absence of a contract to the contrary, the film producers would be exclusive owners of the copyrighted works which were incorporated into their films.

The Legislature sought to negate the effect of the Court's judgement by enacting the Copyright (Amendment) Act 2012. As a result of this amendment, the authors would own their rights in the music and lyrics even if they were created for the purpose of a cinematograph film, regardless of anything mentioned in section 17. Once the synchronisation rights in the music have been licensed to the producers of the cinematograph film, the authors continue to own the remaining rights such as the public performance rights in the music and lyrics. These remaining rights too could be licensed away by the authors but the authors would be entitled to certain minimum royalties.

The 2012 Amendment Act was repealed in January 2018 by the Repealing and Amending (Second) Act, 2017.

== See also ==
- Copyright collective
- Performer rights – rights of performers themselves
- United States v. ASCAP (2010) – American legal case involving public performance rights and digital music downloads
