= GlobeAsia Magazine =

Journal

- Editor: Shoeb Kagda
- Publisher: BeritaSatu Media Holdings
- Founded: 2007
- Country: Indonesia
- Language: English
- Website: globeasia.com

GlobeAsia Magazine is an Indonesian business magazine and website that was established in 2007. Its founder and editor-in-chief is Shoeb Kagda. The magazine is part of the Lippo Group and BeritaSatu Media Holdings.

GlobeAsia Magazine is the first English-language business magazine of Indonesia. Similar to Forbes magazine, it distributes its own lists of Indonesia's wealthiest people, Indonesia's biggest companies, and more.

== See also ==
- List of Indonesians by net worth
