= Notice of Claimed Infringement =

Notice from the owner of a copyrighted material to an online service provider

A Notice of Claimed Infringement or NOCI is a notice from the owner of a copyrighted material to an online service provider. The notice identifies copyrighted material, alleges unauthorized use, and demands expeditious removal. By complying with the demand, the online service provider is relieved of responsibility for the infringing activity of their users.

== Intermediary liability ==
The US Digital Millennium Copyright Act (1998) exempts online intermediaries who host content that infringes copyright, so long as they do not know about it and take actions once the infringing content is brought to their attention. In order to protect their copyright, the owner must notify the online intermediary of the infringing activity, and request that the copyrighted content be removed. The notice is often called a NOCI or a takedown notice.

== See also ==
- Notice and take down
- Online Copyright Infringement Liability Limitation Act
- Online intermediary
