= Barrett v. Rosenthal =

2006 California Supreme Court case

- Supreme Court of California

Decided November 20, 2006
- Full case name: Stephen J. Barrett et al., Plaintiffs and Appellants v. Ilena Rosenthal, Defendant and Respondent
- Citation(s): 40 Cal.4th 33, 146 P.3d 510, 51 Cal.Rptr.3d 55

Court membership
- Chief Justice: George
- Associate Justices: Kennard, Baxter, Werdegar, Chin, Moreno, Corrigan

Case opinions
- Majority: Corrigan, joined by George, Kennard, Baxter, Werdegar, Chin, Moreno
- Concurrence: Moreno

Barrett v. Rosenthal, 40 Cal.4th 33 (2006), was a California Supreme Court case concerning online defamation. The case resolved a defamation claim brought by Stephen Barrett, Terry Polevoy, and attorney Christopher Grell against Ilena Rosenthal and several others. Barrett and others alleged that the defendants had republished libelous information about them on the internet. In a unanimous decision, the court held that Rosenthal was a "user of interactive computer services" and therefore immune from liability under Section 230 of the Communications Decency Act.

The California Supreme Court reversed a judgment by the California Court of Appeals, First District, which would have allowed a trial on one of the defamation claims. The lower court's decision was the first opinion to break from Zeran v. America Online, Inc. by holding that Section 230 immunity was not absolute for common law distributors. In reversing the Court of Appeals, the California Supreme Court reaffirmed Zeran and directed that all claims against the defendants be dismissed.

== Factual background ==
The case concerns an e-mail sent by Tim Bolen, a publicist for alternative medicine practitioners. While working for Hulda Clark, Bolen distributed a missive online message that attacked Stephen Barrett and Terry Polevoy, medical doctors who publicly criticize what they consider quackery. Among other things, Bolen's letter accused Polevoy of stalking a Canadian radio reporter and preventing her from airing a show about alternative medicine.

One of the people who came across Bolen's letter was Ilena Rosenthal, who runs an Internet-based support group for women who have medical problems, which they believe to be caused by breast implants. Rosenthal reposted Bolen's letter on two alternative medicine newsgroups. Barrett contacted her, claiming that the letter was libelous and threatening a lawsuit if she did not remove it. Rosenthal subsequently re-posted Bolen's letter, with a copy of Barrett's threat.

== Lower court proceedings ==
Stephen Barrett, Terry Polevoy, and attorney Christopher Grell filed suit against Clark, Bolen, Rosenthal, and 100 John Doe defendants in November 2000 before Alameda County Superior Court Judge James A. Richman. The case was originally captioned Barrett v. Clark. The defendants were accused of libel and conspiracy to libel, for publishing or republishing allegedly defamatory statements on the internet.

Rosenthal was represented by an attorney from the California Anti-SLAPP Project. Rosenthal moved to be stricken from the suit, citing Section 230 of the Communications Decency Act and California's Anti-SLAPP statute. It was uncontested that Rosenthal had published or republished the e-mail on the internet.

The trial court granted her motion, effectively dropping all of the claims against Rosenthal. In an unusually long 27-page written opinion, Judge Richman dismissed the case (against Rosenthal only) under the California Special motion to strike (an anti-SLAPP statute), which is intended to stop lawsuits that are "brought primarily to chill the valid exercise of the constitutional rights of freedom of speech and petition for redress of grievances". The court further ordered that all three plaintiffs pay Rosenthal's attorney's fees.

The appellate court upheld the dismissal against Grell and Barrett. Still, it vacated the decision as against Polevoy. The court held that Section 230 did not protect Rosenthal for one statement she had reposted on two newsgroups regarding Polevoy's alleged "stalking" of a Canadian talk show host. The court ruled that Rosenthal, as a "distributor," could be held liable under Section 230 for content republished after receiving notice of a potentially defamatory statement, just as vendors of traditional media can be.

Rosenthal petitioned the California Supreme Court to hear the case, and the court granted her petition for review in April 2004.

== California Supreme Court decision ==
The California Supreme Court overturned the lower court in November 2006, in a landmark decision that is the first to interpret Section 230 defamation immunity as providing immunity to an individual internet "user" who is not a provider. The American Civil Liberties Union, the Electronic Frontier Foundation, and a number of internet corporations — including Google, Yahoo!, and AOL — filed briefs on behalf of the defendant, arguing that only the originator of a defamatory statement published on the internet could be held liable.

In the majority opinion, Justice Corrigan observed that the plain language of Section 230 shows that "Congress did not intend for an internet user to be treated differently than an internet provider." Both had immunity from liability for the republication of defamatory content on the internet.

The court agreed that "subjecting Internet service providers and users to defamation liability would tend to chill online speech". (citing Zeran v. America Online, Inc. (4th Cir. 1997) 129 F.3d 327, 331–333), which ruled that Internet users – unlike publishers – are not liable for posting online content. Moreover, the court agreed with Rosenthal in the interpretation of congressional intent:

The congressional intent of fostering free speech on the internet supported the extension of Section 230 immunity to active individual users. It is they who provide much of the 'diversity of political discourse,' the pursuit of 'opportunities for cultural development,' and the exploration of 'myriad avenues for intellectual activity' that the statute was meant to protect.

However, the court also acknowledged that blanket immunity for the redistribution of defamatory statements on the Internet has "disturbing implications". Although plaintiffs are free under Section 230 to sue the originator of a defamatory Internet publication, "any further expansion of liability must await Congressional action".

In a concurring opinion, Justice Carlos Moreno also suggested that immunity would not extend to an online publisher or distributor who conspires to defame an original content provider. However, in this case, there was provided no proof of a conspiracy to defame.

Because Barrett and Polevoy were public figures, to pursue their defamation claims, they would have had to show by clear and convincing evidence that Rosenthal republished Bolen's statements with malice. While the court affirmed the lower court's dismissal of Barrett's claims (finding the statements in question to be non-actionable statements of opinion), the court also noted that the statements concerning Polevoy's alleged stalking may still be actionable if the plaintiff can show that Rosenthal knowingly republished a falsehood or a statement in reckless disregard of its truth. The court also affirmed the lower court's decision to award Rosenthal attorney's fees for prevailing on her anti-SLAPP motion to dismiss; however, the court directed that those fees be reduced to reflect its ruling to permit Polevoy to proceed with his libel claim.
