= JK Harris & Company =

American tax representation firm

- Type: Corporation
- Industry: Taxation
- Founded: 1997
- Headquarters: Charleston, South Carolina, United States, with over 325 offices in 43 states
- Key people: John K. Harris
- Products: Tax preparation, tax representation, bookkeeping/accounting
- Website: JKHarris.com

JK Harris & Company, LLC, founded in 1997, was a tax representation firm in the United States.

== History ==
In September 1997, John K. Harris launched JK Harris & Company. In April 1998, after a six-month trial in six cities, the company opened 450 sales offices and eight regional operations centers over the following three years. In February 2001, JK Harris consolidated its eight regional operations centers to the corporate office in North Charleston, South Carolina. The company purchased a national call center in South Florida in October 2002 to centralize appointment setting, inside sales and other functions. In July 2009, JK Harris & Company moved its corporate office and operations to a larger facility in Goose Creek, South Carolina.

== Founder ==
Company founder John K. Harris is the author of Flashpoint: Seven Core Strategies for Rapid-Fire Business Growth; Sales Flashpoint: Fifteen Strategies for Rapid-Fire Sales Growth (with Richard D. Dickerson); and IRS Tax Secrets: The Individual and Small Business Owner's Guide to Solving IRS and State Tax Problems

== Lawsuits ==
The company has been sued by a number of U.S. Attorneys General after receiving numerous consumer complaints about misleading business and advertising practices. In July 2007 a South Carolina judge approved a $6 million settlement of a class-action lawsuit that had been brought against JK Harris by the Attorneys General of 18 states, including the AG of South Carolina, home to JK Harris' headquarters. The South Carolina Attorney General, Henry McMaster, withdrew from the lawsuit in 2005 because, he said, "there is no case" and any action taken against J.K. Harris & Company would be "unwarranted, unnecessary and unwise". He called the lawsuit "abusive".

The suit claimed that JK Harris & Company was charging customers fees for resolving back tax debts, but then failed to deliver on their promises, and engaged in deceptive marketing and advertising practices, such as promoting that their regional offices were staffed by tax experts when they were often only sales representatives. The company denied the allegations but agreed to settle the lawsuit, along with changing business practices related to their advertising and billing. Missouri's Attorney General filed a similar lawsuit in August 2008 seeking restitution for Missouri residents hurt by the company's "deceptive practices". In April 2009, the Texas Attorney General filed a lawsuit alleging JK Harris had misrepresented its ability to settle unpaid tax obligations on behalf of clients who paid large upfront fees for services they did not receive; that lawsuit was settled in April 2011.

== Liquidation ==
As a result of multiple lawsuits, JK Harris & Company LLC filed for Chapter 11 bankruptcy protection on October 7, 2011. The case was converted to a chapter 7 liquidation, closing the business, on January 10, 2012. JK Harris Small Business Services, LLC filed Chapter 11 and converted to Chapter 7 on the same dates, respectively. The company announced that former employees would be released from non-compete clauses, allowing them to contact and continue to represent past clients.

On March 11, 2012, company founder John K. Harris was arrested for contempt of court for failure to obey a court order in a separate case that pre-dates the bankruptcy. The court order required him to attend a hearing and disclose his income and assets. His attorney, Jack Sinclaire, stated that Harris had been aware of the order but had been busy with the bankruptcy matter. Sinclaire stated: "He [Harris] told the judge he saw the paperwork, but he figured he was in bankruptcy and just didn't do anything about it". On March 12, 2012, the bankruptcy trustee filed a motion in the Bankruptcy Court asserting that it was "extremely difficult or impossible to trace the assets and cash flow of these Debtors" because John K. Harris had been uncooperative. The motion asks the Bankruptcy Court to force Harris to cooperate. The bankruptcy trustee is seeking a nearly $4.8 million judgment against Harris, alleging that he improperly took at least that much out of JK Harris and related companies while they were insolvent, from 2004 until they shut down.
