= United States v. ASCAP =

American legal case

- Court: United States Court of Appeals for the Second Circuit
- Full case name: United States v. American Society of Composers, Authors and Publishers et al.
- Decided: September 28, 2010
- Citation: No. 09-0539, 2010 WL 3749292 (2nd Cir. 2010)

Court membership
- Judges sitting: Dennis Jacobs, John M. Walker, Jr. & Debra Ann Livingston

United States v. American Society of Composers, Authors and Publishers (ASCAP) et al., No. 09-0539, 2010 WL 3749292 (2nd Cir. 2010), was a United States Court of Appeals case involving copyright liability for third-party vendors that provide online music download services. In particular, the Second Circuit ruled that music downloads do not constitute public performances, upholding the district court's decision and consequently preventing ASCAP from claiming higher royalty fees from Yahoo! and RealNetworks for downloaded music. However, the Second Circuit disagreed with the district court's method of fee assessment and remanded the case for further proceedings. ASCAP appealed the decision and requested a writ of certiorari for judicial review in the Supreme Court.

== Background information ==
Yahoo! and RealNetworks sought blanket licenses from ASCAP, a non-profit organization exclusively licensing more than 390,000 songwriters, composers, lyricists, and music publishers in the United States. A blanket license is a "license that gives the licensee the right to perform all of the works in the repertory for a single stated fee that does not vary depending on how much music from the repertory the licensee actually uses." In order to settle the royalty payments owed to the music owners represented by ASCAP, the companies and ASCAP sought an assessment from the United States District Court for the Southern District of New York.

During the proceedings to establish a reasonable royalty rate, ASCAP claimed that individual downloads count as public performances, allowing a copyright holder's exclusive performance rights to be factored into the assessment of fees in addition to the exclusive rights of reproduction and distribution. If downloads were to count as public performances, each download would serve to increase the rate of royalties owed to copyright holders that licensed through ASCAP. Yahoo! and RealNetworks disagreed, citing that downloads involved only reproduction and distribution rights, not performance rights.

This case centers around the controversial issue of royalty rates for internet radio under the Digital Millennium Copyright Act (DMCA). The DMCA, passed in 1998, included provisions that required Internet and satellite radio providers to pay performance royalties in addition to the standard publishing royalties paid by radio stations.

This case falls under a consent decree originally entered into by ASCAP and the judicial department in 1941 as part of an antitrust case. Some scholars question the utility of such consent decrees as a means for resolving modern copyright issues, citing that such decrees failed to anticipate the modern complexities of copyright enforcement.

== Second Circuit's analysis ==
=== Facts ===
The Second Circuit established relevant facts regarding the nature of the online services provided by Yahoo! and RealNetworks. The court first identified two main categories of media provided: "radio-style" webcasts, in which audio and video are streamed to users able to perceive the media while it is simultaneously being transmitted to their computers. In addition, both providers offered users downloadable copies of music, not perceived by the user during transmission. The court further noted that for both Yahoo! and RealNetworks, "only a small portion" of each company's website involved the performance of musical works. The court further identified two main sources of income from the performances of musical works. The primary source of revenue generated from each company's online services came from advertisements supported by user traffic; in the words of the court, "the larger the audience and the more times a site is visited, the greater the revenue generated." The remainder of performance based revenue was subscription based. Finally the court cited relevant earlier decisions passed down from the district court in 2007, 2008, and 2009. The district court first established that downloads did not constitute performances, later establishing a method for computing fees owed to ASCAP by Yahoo! and RealNetworks. The district court adopted a simple formula of a 2.5% royalty rate multiplied by the amount of revenue generated by the performance of musical works from ASCAP's repertory. For Yahoo!, the district court took into account the fact that musical performances did not account for all of the revenue generated by its website. It thus estimated a "music-use-adjustment factor" (MUAF), consisting of the amount of time users spent streaming music divided by the amount of time all of Yahoo!'s online services were used. The court then multiplied the MUAF by Yahoo!'s total revenue in order to estimate the total revenue generated from musical performances. The court followed a similar line of reasoning for determining RealNetworks's fee: first declining to use the MUAF since most of RealNetworks's revenue came from performances of musical works but ultimately adopting MUAFs without explaining the calculations behind them.

=== Is a download a public performance? ===
The Second Circuit first reiterated the exclusive rights of copyright holders under Section 106 of the Copyright Act, including the right "to perform the copyrighted work publicly." The court also noted the undisputed fact that both Yahoo! and RealNetworks provided services by which users could download, and hence copy, musical works, thus requiring compensation to be paid to the owners of those works through ASCAP. The court then identified the main issue under review, whether or not a download is a public performance, which would require separate compensation for the copyright holders.

The circuit court first referenced the definition of a performance under Section 101 of the Copyright Act, which states that "[t]o 'perform' a work means to recite, render, play, dance, or act it, either directly or by means of any device or process." The court immediately ruled out a download as being a dance or an act, and subsequently dissected the statutes of "recite," "render," and "play." Referencing Barnhart v. Sigmon Coal Co., 534 U.S. 438, 450 (2002), which held that plain statutes should be taken for "their ordinary, contemporary, common meaning," the court cited Webster's Third New International Dictionary 1895 (1981) to arrive at the definitions of the three remaining statutes. The court concluded that a musical performance "entails contemporaneous perceptibility," further citing the final clause of Section 101 as a confirmation of this definition. Thus, the circuit court upheld the district court's ruling:

The downloads at issue in this appeal are not musical performances that are contemporaneously perceived by the listener. They are simply transfers of electronic files containing digital copies from an on-line server to a local hard drive. The downloaded songs are not performed in any perceptible manner during the transfers; the user must take some further action to play the songs after they are downloaded. Because the electronic download itself involves no recitation, rendering, or playing of the musical work encoded in the digital transmission, we hold that such a download is not a performance of that work, as defined by § 101.

ASCAP further argued that a download fulfilled the "public" portion of the definition under Section 101 since a download transmits a musical work to the public, thus constituting a public performance. However, the court dismissed this claim as a misreading of the definition of a performance, stating that "the definition of 'publicly' simply defines the circumstances under which a performance will be considered public; it does not define the meaning of 'performance.'"

=== Assessment of fees ===
The Second Circuit also reviewed the district court's methods for determining royalty fees for each company. The circuit court found the district court's assessments flawed in the following two areas:

- The district court did not adequately support its methodology in determining the number of performances of musical works that each company services provided, specifically with regards to the MUAF
- The district court did not supply an adequate explanation for the use of a uniform 2.5% royalty rate applied to each company

=== Conclusion and Precedence ===
The Second Circuit affirmed the district court's ruling that downloads are not performances, but it also vacated the district court's assessment of fees. The court thus remanded the case (send it back to the District Court for further action). This decision serves to limit the reach of copyright holders in assessing various fees to content providers.

== See also ==
- Performing rights
- Copyright infringement
- 17 U.S.C. § 101
