= Bnetd =

Communication app

bnetd
- Original author: Mark Baysinger
- Release: April 28, 1998; 28 years ago (as StarHack)
- Preview release: 0.4.25 / January 22, 2002; 24 years ago
- Written in: C
- Operating system: Linux, Windows
- Available in: English
- Type: Communication software
- License: GNU General Public License
- Website: www.chiark.greenend.org.uk/~owend/free/bnetd.html

bnetd is a software application that provided near-complete emulation of the original online multiplayer gaming service network Battle.net. Originally released on April 28, 1998 under the name StarHack, it enabled users of the online game StarCraft (and StarCraft: Brood War) to connect and chat together without using the official service, and without requiring CD key authentication. This was accomplished through reverse engineering of Blizzard Entertainment's online service.

Due to a lawsuit in 2002 in the United States that Blizzard won against bnetd's original developers, they no longer maintain or host bnetd.

== History ==
The online game StarCraft was released on March 31, 1998, and required the online multiplayer gaming service network Battle.net. The near-complete emulation of this network was released with the first version of bnetd on April 28, 1998 by Mark Baysinger, who at the time was a student at UC San Diego, under the name StarHack because it was originally meant for StarCraft to connect and chat together.

On April 29, 1998, Baysinger received a cease-and-desist letter from the Software Publishers Association who threatened to file a lawsuit unless three demands were met within three days. In response to the email, Baysinger requested for the Software Publishers Association to wait until May 7, 1998 to allow Baysinger time for legal advice which was granted. On May 7, 1998, Baysinger directly addressed to the three demands but received no further communication from the Software Publishers Association. Due to time limitations, Baysinger abandoned the project in December 1998. However, because the project was open sourced under the GNU General Public License, the project was continued by a group of volunteers and as Blizzard released more games, the project was renamed to bnetd.

== CD key non-interoperability ==
Blizzard games are packaged with unique codes. CD keys are entered, but not verified, during the installation process. Connection to battle.net is permitted only with a valid and unique key. Individual keys are regularly disabled by battle.net administrators to block suspected cheaters from battle.net. Players with invalid or disabled keys remain able to play independently of battle.net, such as in single-player mode, or through a direct connection to another player.

Blizzard, citing security and piracy concerns on their webpage about emulation, does not allow battle.net to interoperate with bnetd servers to verify CD keys. Because of this, bnetd servers do not implement battle.net's validation. This allows players to access full multiplayer functionality of Battle.net capable games without a valid CD key, by connecting to a bnetd server.

== Blizzard takedown demand and lawsuit ==
In February 2002, Blizzard filed a DMCA safe harbor takedown demand against bnetd with their Internet service provider (ISP). Blizzard subsequently filed suit against the developers of bnetd and their ISP, Internet Gateway, in the United States District Court for the Eastern District of Missouri. The lawsuit alleged copyright infringement, trademark infringement, and violations of their games' End User License Agreement (sometimes referred to as a clickwrap license) and DMCA anti-circumvention prohibitions, in what would become an important test case for portions of that law. The Electronic Frontier Foundation mounted a defense, in which defendants denied copying any portion of battle.net or Blizzard games, denied the validity of the battle.net trademark, denied that CD keys are an anti-piracy measure, and denied that bnetd is a circumvention tool.

In September 2004, the court disagreed and granted summary judgement to Blizzard. On appeal, defendants argued that federal copyright law, which permits reverse engineering, preempts California state contract law, upon which the EULA's prohibition on reverse engineering is grounded.

In September 2005, the Eighth Circuit Court of Appeals rejected the defendants' argument and affirmed the lower court's decision. "Appellants failed to establish a genuine issue of material fact as to the applicability of the interoperability exception [of the DMCA]. The district court properly granted summary judgement in favor of Blizzard and Vivendi on the operability exception." The appeals court further ruled that bnetd circumvents copy protection in violation of the DMCA.

bnetd developer Ross Combs and EFF staff attorney Jason Schultz criticized the appeals court ruling, claiming the ruling means software and hardware vendors can use a DMCA-EULA combination to prevent otherwise lawful reverse engineering and chill the development of interoperable systems. Blizzard co-founder Mike Morhaime called the ruling "a major victory against software piracy." An Entertainment Software Association representative also supported the ruling, claiming it reinforces the DMCA's ability to prevent "IP abuse and theft."

As a result of the litigation, the bnetd.org domain was transferred to Blizzard's control pursuant to the consent decree entered during the trial. The domain is now offline but still registered by Blizzard. Although Blizzard won the case, the lawsuit did not stop the continued distribution of bnetd's open source code, nor of derivative projects such as PvPGN. Other hosts were quickly set up by third parties in countries where no anti-circumvention legislation equivalent to the DMCA exists.

== See also ==
- Bowers v. Baystate Technologies
- PvPGN – Free and open source software project
- Stratagus – Game engine
