= Tiffany (NJ) Inc. v. eBay Inc. =

American legal case

- Court: United States Court of Appeals for the Second Circuit
- Full case name: Tiffany (NJ) Inc. and Tiffany and Company v. eBay Inc.
- Argued: July 16, 2009
- Decided: April 1, 2010
- Citation: 600 F.3d 93

Case history
- Prior actions: Tiffany Inc. v. eBay, Inc., 576 F. Supp. 2d 463 (S.D.N.Y. 2008) (district court found no trademark infringement, unfair competition, false advertising, trademark dilution)
- Subsequent actions: Tiffany Inc. v. eBay, Inc., 2010 WL 3733894 (S.D.N.Y. 2010) (district court found no evidence of false advertisement) Tiffany Inc. v. eBay, Inc., 131 S. Ct. 647 (writ of certiorari denied by Supreme Court)

Holding
- The court affirmed the judgment of the district court with respect to the claims of trademark infringement and dilution. The false advertising claim was returned to the district court for further processing, which was then ruled in favor of eBay.

Court membership
- Judges sitting: Robert David Sack, Barrington Daniels Parker, Jr., Richard W. Goldberg

Case opinions
- eBay’s use of the Tiffany trademark is protected by the nominative fair use defense. Generalized knowledge of infringing activities by third parties is insufficient to attach contributory trademark infringement liability. Extrinsic evidence is necessary to determine customer confusion for Lanham Act false advertisement liability.
- Majority: Sack, joined by a unanimous panel

Keywords
- counterfeiting, Lanham Act, trademark infringement, trademark dilution, nominative fair use

Tiffany (NJ) Inc. v. eBay Inc. 600 F.3d 93 (2nd Cir. 2010), was a landmark case in which the United States Court of Appeals for the Second Circuit first addressed contributory trademark infringement in the context of online marketplaces.

The case began in 2004 when Tiffany & Co. filed a complaint against eBay, alleging that the platform's conduct (i.e., facilitating and advertising the sale of counterfeit "Tiffany" goods) constituted direct and contributory trademark infringement, trademark dilution, and false advertising. Following a bench trial, the District Court for the Southern District of New York ruled in eBay's favor on all claims on July 14, 2008.

Tiffany subsequently appealed to the U.S. Court of Appeals for the Second Circuit, which affirmed the district court's rulings that eBay was not liable for trademark infringement and dilution. However, the false advertising claim was remanded for further review, though the district court again ruled in eBay's favor.

== Background ==
=== Tiffany ===
Founded in 1837, Tiffany & Co. is an American luxury goods company selling jewelry, watches, and home items. Created in New York City by Charles Lewis Tiffany, Tiffany closely controls its trademarks through its distribution chains.

In 2009, Tiffany had worldwide net earnings of $368.4 million, 90% of which derived from jewelry sales.

=== eBay ===
eBay is an online-market place, founded in 1995, that allows its registered users to buy and sell items with other users. eBay has more than 97 million active users globally, In 2010, users worldwide collectively traded more than $2,000 worth of goods every second. Sellers put listings of their items under certain categories, such as "Books" or "Electronics", and potential buyers can search the items they want by keyword search or by browsing under the category. The two parties contact each other directly and decide the payment and shipping details to complete a transaction. eBay makes revenue by charging the sellers a commission fee for its listing services and for each completed deal. eBay addresses trademark owners’ concerns through their Verified Rights Owner (VeRO) program and "fraud engine". Through VeRO, owners of trademarks report potentially infringing listings to eBay by submitting a Notice of Claimed Infringement form (NOCI). eBay staff review submitted NOCIs and remove the offending listings if the information is accurate. The fraud engine is a collection of software rules and models that automatically find and remove listings that violate eBay policies.

Starting from 2004, counterfeit Tiffany goods were found to be sold on eBay's website, which could also be linked from eBay's homepage as top-sale listings.

=== Actions leading to litigation ===
In May 2003, Tiffany complained to eBay regarding the sale of counterfeit items on its website and eBay recommended Tiffany participate in VeRO. In 2004 (and again in 2005 after litigation ensued), Tiffany conducted surveys to determine the extent of counterfeiting occurring on eBay. Tiffany hired a third party to purchase a random sample of items bought from eBay using the keywords "Tiffany" and "sterling" and then inspected these items for authenticity. 136 pieces were purchased in 2004, 73.1% of which were counterfeit, 5% were authentic, and the remaining 21.9% were unverifiable. 139 items were purchased in 2005, 75.5% of which were counterfeit.

After counterfeit items continued to be sold on eBay, Tiffany made 5 different demands on eBay in June 2004 – (1.) Prevent sellers from listing 5 or more Tiffany jewelry items at once, (2.) Ban the sale of silver Tiffany jewelry, (3.) Ban the sale of items advertised as counterfeit Tiffany, (4.) Stop advertising the availability of Tiffany merchandise, and (5.) Remove ‘Tiffany’ sponsored link advertisements on search engines. Although eBay continued to allow the sale of Tiffany jewelry and buy sponsored link advertisements through a third party, eBay's refusal to categorically ban sellers listing more than 5 Tiffany items at a time triggered this lawsuit.

== District Court findings ==
On July 14, 2008, the district court ruled in favor of eBay on all issues. Tiffany appealed and on April 1, 2010, the Second Circuit court ruled in favor of eBay on all issues, except the false advertising claim, which it remanded back to the district court. On remand, the district court again ruled in favor of eBay on the last issue on Sept. 13, 2010.

=== Direct trademark infringement ===
EBay's use of the Tiffany marks – Tiffany pointed out that eBay advertised the availability of Tiffany goods on eBay's market through several ways such as "on the eBay home page, through communications with sellers and buyers, and through lists of top search terms and popular brand names." From this, the Court ruled that "eBay's use of the Tiffany marks on its website did not create the impression that Tiffany had affiliated itself with, sponsored, or endorsed the sale of Tiffany items on eBay" and that eBay's use of Tiffany marks on its homepage was "a protected nominative fair use."

1. eBay demonstrated that it is necessary to use the Tiffany marks in order to identify and describe their jewelry.
2. eBay demonstrated that it did not use the marks more than necessary to identify the item.
3. eBay showed that it did not do anything that would suggest that Tiffany & Co. was sponsoring or endorsing any of the listings or eBay itself.

Tiffany alleged eBay violated the Lanham Act and New York state common law by directly infringing on its trademark in three ways. First, eBay profited from the sales of Tiffany jewelry resulting from the Tiffany trademark. Second, eBay bought sponsored links on Google and Yahoo! that advertised eBay listings for Tiffany items. Lastly, eBay should be held liable jointly and severally with the offending sellers, even though eBay didn't directly list counterfeit items.

Purchase of Sponsored Links. In response to Tiffany's assertion that eBay's practice of purchasing search engine advertising links constitutes direct trademark infringement, eBay claimed, under 1-800 Contacts, Inc. v. WhenU.Com, Inc. this conduct is not trademark "use" and thus is not infringing. While the Court found that 1-800 Contacts case is distinguishable from the current case, it concluded that the conduct is protected as a nominative fair use even if it was actually a use of the trademark. The reason is simply that eBay's use of the TIFFANY Marks in sponsored links is effectively identical to that on its own website, and thus the same conclusions can be made.

Joint and Several Liability. To support this allegation, Tiffany referred to Gucci America, Inc. v. Exclusive Imports International. The court held that, however, that the two cases were entirely distinguishable from one another because eBay "never takes possession of items sold through its website, and that eBay does not directly sell the counterfeit Tiffany merchandise to buyers." The court found that Tiffany's "joint and several liability" was misplaced and more applicable under the theory of contributory infringement rather than direct infringement and that eBay was not "liable for direct trademark infringement under state or federal law."

The Second Circuit held that the nominative fair use defense protected eBay's activities because eBay needed to reference the Tiffany name to identify the jewelry, eBay only used enough of the trademark as was "reasonably necessary" to make that identification, and eBay did not suggest endorsement or sponsorship by Tiffany. Further, because eBay does not take possession of counterfeit goods, nor does eBay directly sell items, this issue would be more properly argued under contributory trademark infringement.

=== Contributory trademark infringement ===
Tiffany claimed the contributory trademark infringement of eBay, which was a judicially constructed doctrine articulated by the Supreme Court in Inwood Laboratories, Inc. v. Ives Laboratories, Inc. and found the liability for trademark infringement can extend beyond those who actually mislabel goods with the mark of another. As established in Inwood, "if a manufacturer or distributor intentionally induces another to infringe a trademark, or if it continues to supply its product to one whom it knows or has reason to know is engaging in trademark infringement, the manufacturer or distributor is contributorially responsible for any harm done as a result of the deceit." Using this finding, Tiffany claimed that eBay continued to provide its platform despite its knowledge, or reason to know, that counterfeit merchandise is being sold.

Product vs. service – eBay argued that its website was service that provides a "venue for listings created and posted by third parties" rather than a "product" as defined by the Inwood case. The Court agreed that eBay fell on the "service" side of the product/service distinction. After examining all the facts, the Court found that "eBay exercises sufficient control and monitoring over its websites" and is similar to a flea market and uses Hendrickson v. eBay as a case that eBay "features elements of both traditional swap meets—where sellers pay for use of space to display goods— and traditional auction houses where goods are sold in a highest bid process." The court concluded that "eBay's conduct must be assessed under the standard for contributory negligence set forth in Inwood." The Second Circuit held that eBay did not have the requisite level of knowledge to satisfy the Inwood standard. "For contributory trademark infringement liability…, a service provider must have more than a general knowledge or reason to know that its service is being used to sell counterfeit goods." Here, Tiffany did not identify specific cases of infringement to eBay; and when NOCIs did identify specific sellers, eBay suspended them. Therefore, eBay was not liable for contributory trademark infringement.

Knowledge Or Reason To Know. Tiffany provided the evidence that eBay had been notified "that some portion of the Tiffany goods sold on its website might be counterfeit." Tiffany informed eBay by sending demand letters in 2003 and 2004, buying products in eBay's 2004 Buying Program and appraising that 73.1% of Tiffany's purchases were counterfeit and filing thousands of Notices of Claimed Infringement (NOCIs) submissions.

Tiffany argued that eBay's generalized knowledge of the counterfeit items should have prompted them to "preemptively remedy the problem at the very moment that it knew or had reason to know that the infringing conduct was generally occurring, even without specific knowledge as to individual instances of infringing listings or sellers." The court ruled that the generalized knowledge that eBay possessed was insufficient under the Inwood test and that eBay could not be forced to remedy the problem.

Willful Blindness. The Court considered whether eBay was willfully blind to the infringement. Tiffany contended that eBay was obligated to perform investigations on the infringing behaviors on its websites, given the knowledge and evidences provided by Tiffany. Nevertheless, evidence showed that eBay had spent significant efforts to fight with the sales of counterfeit items on its websites, including the VeRO program and the fraud engine. Upon the general knowledge of the problem, eBay also took reasonable steps to remedy the problem through its general anti-fraud tools. The Court thus held that eBay was not willfully blind. The court concluded that eBay did not ignore the infringing activities and tried to prevent the sale of counterfeit items, as evidenced by the VeRO program and the "fraud engine". In addition, eBay had no affirmative duty to search for potentially infringing items without specific knowledge.

The appellate court also agreed with the district court's ruling that eBay was not liable for contributory trademark infringement in specific cases where eBay received a NOCI from Tiffany and didn't permanently ban the seller. In these cases, Tiffany argued that the filing of the NOCI satisfied the Inwood "knowledge or reason to know of infringement" requirement for these specific infringing sales. The district court concluded, however, that eBay needed only to take "appropriate steps" after receiving the NOCI. A NOCI was not conclusive evidence of actual infringement; instead, it was a good-faith assertion by the trademark owner of infringement. Therefore, permanently suspending the seller was unnecessary, and eBay's prompt removal of potentially violating listings was appropriate. While eBay could have screened out potentially infringing listings more cost efficiently than Tiffany, the trademark right holder has the responsibility to police for infringement.

Continue to Supply. Although the general evidence was not sufficient for eBay to take the duty, the NOCIs filed by Tiffany to eBay clearly provided the specific knowledge of infringement. Tiffany argued that eBay continued to serve individual infringers by failing to take adequate steps in response to the NOCIs submissions, and the same listing with the same username appeared on the website even if they were pointed out in NOCIs. The Court held that, first of all, Tiffany wrongly equated the NOCIs, which were merely a good belief, with the determination of counterfeit, and moreover, Tiffany failed to provide evidence for this claim, as the record showed that eBay took appropriate steps to remove such listings and warn the users who sold counterfeit items, instead of continuing to supply such individual sales.

=== Other Causes of Action ===
Unfair Competition. Tiffany alleged "unfair competition, infringement, and the use of false descriptions and representations under Section 43(a) of the Lanham Act and New York common law." According to Starbucks Corp. v. Wolfe's Borough Coffee, Inc., in which the Lanham Act infringement and Section 43(a) claims were considered jointly, the Section 43(a) claims of Tiffany are governed by the same legal analysis as its federal infringement claims. Thus, Tiffany's Section 43(a) claims must fail as the contributory and direct infringement claims failed. Since eBay routinely removed listings that Tiffany reported to it and spent significant efforts on investigating the items, Tiffany has failed to show the bad faith by eBay.

False advertising – Tiffany alleged false advertising under Section 43(a)(1)(B) of the Lanham Act, as eBay engaged in advertising the counterfeit Tiffany merchandise on its homepage and on sponsored links for the Yahoo! and Google search engines. The court disagreed, due to the following reasons:

1. eBay's use of the term "Tiffany" was fair use.
2. Although eBay had the generalized knowledge that many Tiffany products sold on its website were counterfeit, Tiffany did not prove that eBay had specific knowledge on which product was counterfeit.
3. To the extent that the advertising was false, it was the responsibility of the third-party sellers rather than eBay's.

Also the court stated that because eBay was actively removing the purportedly counterfeit items from its listings, they could not be seen as misleading customers. The district court found nothing literally false in eBay's advertisements since eBay did sell authentic Tiffany products for sale, making eBay's advertising practices a nominative fair use. The Second Circuit reversed, holding that extrinsic evidence was necessary to determine if eBay's advertisements were likely to mislead or confuse consumers. Since the district court did not look at extrinsic evidence, the appellate court remanded this case to the district court. On remand, the district court concluded that no extrinsic evidence indicated that the advertisement in question misled or confused any consumers. Therefore, there was no Lanham Act false advertising violation.

Trademark dilution – Tiffany also challenged eBay's practice constitute trademark dilution under the Lanham Act, 15 U.S.C. § 1125(c), as well as under New York General Business Law § 360-l. Specifically, Tiffany argued that eBay was liable for dilution by blurring and dilution by tarnishment. In addition, Tiffany also claimed the contributory trademark dilution of eBay. The Court concluded that, however, Tiffany failed to prove that eBay was liable for trademark dilution and that even if that eBay could be liable for dilution, eBay's use of the Tiffany marks was a protected, nominative fair use.

== Court of Appeals (Second Circuit) Opinions ==
=== Direct Trademark Infringement ===
The Court agreed with the district court that eBay's use of the Tiffany marks did not constitute direct trademark infringement. The court saw eBay's use of the mark as a way "to describe accurately the genuine Tiffany goods offered for sale on its website." The court also used the fact that the "About Me" page of Tiffany that is located on eBay's website explains that "[m]ost of the purported `TIFFANY & CO.' silver jewelry and packaging available on eBay is counterfeit."

=== Contributory Trademark Infringement ===
The Court affirmed the decision the district court made in favor of eBay regarding contributory trademark infringement. Although the Inwood test was meant for regulating the manufactures or distributor of products, Courts have decided to extend it to services, which eBay provided in this case. When Tiffany argued that eBay was liable because it "continues to supply its service to one whom it knows or has reason to know is engaging in trademark infringement", the district court's opinion was eBay does not have specific knowledge of the infringement instances. Tiffany disagreed. Tiffany argued that eBay knew clearly that the infringing sales were ubiquitous on its websites and continued to provide its services. The Court rejected this argument and found such general knowledge was still insufficient for eBay to take an affirmative duty.

=== Trademark Dilution ===
Tiffany contended that eBay's advertising practices constituted trademark dilution under the Lanham Act and New York state business law. Tiffany argued that counterfeit items of inferior quality were sold, harming the distinctiveness, value, and reputation of the trademark. In addition, Tiffany argued that eBay should be liable for contributory dilution for encouraging third parties to dilute its trademark. The district court reasoned that eBay was not liable because eBay did not try to confuse the Tiffany trademark with its own product, an online auction website, but used the mark to advertise the availability of authentic Tiffany merchandise on its website. There was "no second mark or product at issue here to blur with or to tarnish" the Tiffany trademark and therefore, no trademark dilution.

The district court rejected Tiffany's claim of dilution by blurring as eBay never attempted to associate the Tiffany marks with its own products. By such, the dilution by tarnishment also could not be held. Tiffany did not bring this decision on appeal.

=== False Advertising ===
Tiffany submitted that eBay was liable for false advertising as they advertised in various ways the availability of the Tiffany jewelry and most of them were in fact counterfeit. The district court rejected this claim and thought eBay's advertisement was not literally false because genuine products were indeed sold on their websites.

== Supreme Court ==
Tiffany filed a petition for a writ of certiorari to the Supreme Court, which was denied on Nov. 29, 2010. Justice Sotomayor took no part in the decision.

== Implications ==
The Second Circuit ruling has been lauded by organizations such as the Electronic Frontier Foundation (EFF), Public Citizen, and Public Knowledge. EFF argued that internet commerce would be stifled if the burden of policing for trademarks were placed on intermediaries, such as eBay, because any listing even remotely suspicious would be removed. Other commentators have noted that eBay's investments in reducing the amount of counterfeit goods sold on its website helped it win in the lower courts and to cement the victory in the Circuit court.

Organizations such as the International AntiCounterfeiting Coalition (IACC), however, accuse eBay of "turning a blind eye" to the amount of counterfeiting that occurs on its website. According to the IACC, 29% of online counterfeit sales occur through eBay. Others have pointed out that the burden to police for counterfeits may hit small businesses particularly hard. In addition, the Supreme Court's denial of appeal leaves open the possibility that courts in different districts may come to a different conclusion in the future, leading to a conflict in case law. Others have decried the court's focus on eBay's "investment" in reducing counterfeiting without reference to the overall economics of either eBay's profitability or the contribution of sales of counterfeits to its success. More to the point, the court did make a finding that "eBay appears to concede that it knew as a general matter that counterfeit Tiffany products were listed and sold through its website," but this general knowledge was not sufficient to trigger liability. The liability appears to trigger only when specific individuals (i.e., sellers or stores) are engaged in the counterfeiting of goods, and can be notified to eBay.

French courts have disagreed with the Second Circuit decision. In 2008, Louis Vuitton Moet Hennessy (LVMH) sued eBay in France over the sales of counterfeit perfumes and handbags on its website. LVMH alleged eBay had not done enough to stop the sale of counterfeit goods, but eBay lost the lawsuit. In 2010, LVMH again sued eBay, this time for harming the reputation of the Louis Vuitton trademark and domain name. LVMH won and received €200,000 in damages. The French tribunal put the onus on eBay to enforce adequate measures to prevent illicit goods from entering the market. For example, sellers could be asked to provide receipts of purchase or even certificates of authenticity. eBay could also be made to notify customers when the origin of a good appears doubtful. Commentators have suggested that this disparity between French and U.S. law may "weaken the integrity of the online marketplace."

== See also ==
- Lanham Act
