= David Post =

American legal scholar (born 1951)

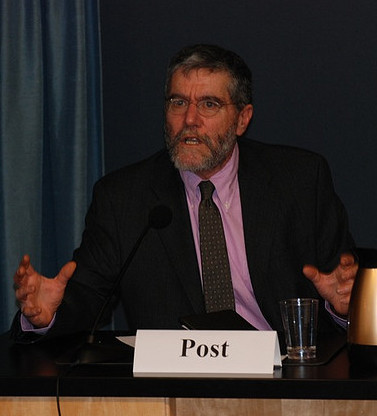
- David G. Post speaking at Cato Institute
- Born: September 26, 1951 (age 74)
- Education: Yale University (BA, PhD); Georgetown University (JD)
- Occupation: Legal scholar

David G. Post (born 1951) is an American legal scholar. Post is an expert in intellectual property law and cyberspace law. Until his retirement in 2014, Post served as Professor of Law at Beasley School of Law of Temple University in Philadelphia.

== Education ==
Post received his B.A. cum laude from Yale College in 1972, his Ph.D. in anthropology from Yale University in 1978, and his J.D. summa cum laude from Georgetown University Law Center in 1986.

== Career ==
Post was the director of programs for the American Anthropological Association from 1976 to 1981 and an assistant professor of anthropology at Columbia University from 1981 to 1983.

Post served as law clerk to Ruth Bader Ginsburg twice, once from 1986 to 1987, when Ginsburg was a judge of the U.S. Court of Appeals for the District of Columbia Circuit, and a second time from 1993 to 1994, after Ginsburg had been elevated to the Supreme Court of the United States. In between, from 1987 to 1993, Post practiced law in Washington, D.C. as an associate at the law firm of Wilmer, Cutler & Pickering.

From 1994 to 1997, Post was an associate professor of law at Georgetown University Law Center. In 1997, he joined the Beasley School of Law of Temple University in Philadelphia as a professor of law, remaining there until his retirement as the I. Herman Stern Professor of Law in fall 2014.

Post is a fellow of the Center for Democracy and Technology and the New York Law School's Institute for Information Law and Policy, an adjunct scholar at the Cato Institute, and a contributor to the Volokh Conspiracy blog at The Washington Post. Post was formerly a senior fellow at the Open Technology Institute of the New America Foundation.

== Works and views ==
Post's main area of scholarly interest is intellectual property law and the relationship of complexity theory to the law.

Post wrote In Search of Jefferson's Moose: Notes on the State of Cyberspace (Oxford, 2009). In the book, Post draws a parallel "between the Internet and the natural and intellectual landscape that Thomas Jefferson explored, documented, and shaped." The book earned positive reviews from legal scholars, including Lawrence Lessig, Jonathan Zittrain, and Sean Wilentz. Post also coauthored, with Paul Schiff Berman and Patricia Bellia, another book, Cyberlaw: Problems of Policy and Jurisprudence in the Information Age (West, 2007), currently in its fourth (2011) edition.

Post had authored a number of amicus briefs to the U.S. Supreme Court and other courts.

Post was a signatory to an open letter from law professors in 2014 that expressed support for the legal recognition of same-sex marriages but also expressed concern that events (such as the resignation of Mozilla CEO Brendan Eich after an outcry over a contribution that Eich had made to an anti-same-sex-marriage effort) "signal an eagerness by some supporters of same-sex marriage to punish rather than to criticize or to persuade those who disagree."

== See also ==
- List of law clerks for the sixth seat of the Supreme Court of the United States
