= William F. Patry =

American lawyer

- Patry in October 2009
- Born: January 1, 1950 (age 75); Niskayuna, New York, U.S.
- Education: San Francisco State University (BA, MA); University of Houston (JD)
- Occupation: Lawyer

William F. Patry (born January 1, 1950, in Niskayuna, New York) is an American lawyer specializing in copyright law. He studied at the San Francisco State University, where he obtained a B.A. in 1974 and an M.A. in 1976, and then at the University of Houston, where he graduated with a J.D. in 1980. He was admitted to the bar in Texas in 1981, in the District of Columbia in 2000, and in New York in 2001.

== Biography ==
Patry served as a copyright counsel to the U.S. House of Representatives in the early 1990s, where he participated in the elaboration of the copyright provisions of the Uruguay Round Agreements Act. Patry also worked as a policy planning advisor to the Register of Copyrights, and held a post as Professor of Law at the Benjamin N. Cardozo School of Law. He is also the author of an eight volume treatise on U.S. copyright law entitled Patry on Copyright.

On August 1, 2008, Patry announced the termination of his blog, giving as reasons both the unwillingness of too many people to treat it as the personal blog that it was and the sad state of copyright law.

In 2009 he published Moral Panics and the Copyright Wars, and temporarily resumed blogging in support of the book.

For 17 years he was senior copyright counsel at Google. As of 2024 he is a partner in the intellectual property practice of the Mayer Brown firm in New York City.

== Selected bibliography ==
Books:

- Patry, William F. (March 1985). The fair use privilege in copyright law. ISBN 0-87179-451-9.
- Patry, William F. (1994). Copyright Law and Practice. ISBN 0-87179-854-9.
- Patry, William F.: Patry on Copyright, Thomson West (Westlaw), 2007.
- Patry, William (2009). Moral Panics and the Copyright Wars. ISBN 978-0-19-538564-9.
- Patry, William (2011). How to Fix Copyright. ISBN 978-0-19-976009-1.

Papers:

- Patry, W. F.: The Failure of the American Copyright System: Protecting the Idle Rich, 72 Notre Dame L. Rev. 907 (May 1997).

== See also ==
- Bridgeman Art Library v. Corel Corp.
