= Cartoon Network, LP v. CSC Holdings, Inc. =

American legal case

- Court: United States Court of Appeals for the Second Circuit
- Full case name: Cartoon Network, LP, LLLP v. CSC Holdings, Inc.
- Argued: October 24, 2007
- Decided: August 4, 2008

Holding
- Digital video recorder (DVR) services operated by cable television copies do not create copies of copyrighted content that must be authorized under copyright law.

Court membership
- Judges sitting: John M. Walker, Jr., Robert D. Sack, and Debra Livingston

Case opinions
- Decision by: John M. Walker, Jr.

Keywords
- copyright infringement, embodiment, transitory duration

Cartoon Network, LP v. CSC Holdings, Inc., 536 F.3d 121 (2nd Cir., 2008), was a United States Court of Appeals for the Second Circuit decision regarding copyright infringement in the context of DVR (digital video recorder) systems operated by cable television service providers. It is notable for distinguishing the Ninth Circuit precedent MAI Systems Corp. v. Peak Computer, Inc., regarding whether a momentary data stream is a "copy" per copyright law.

In this case, Cablevision, a cable television provider, sought to implement a DVR service for its subscribers, allowing them to create copies of programs to be replayed at a later time. A consortium of copyright holders in the television and film industries sued for direct copyright infringement on the grounds of unlawful copying and public performance. The Second Circuit ruled that the DVR service did not constitute infringement.

== Background ==
Cablevision, a cable television provider, announced the development of a "Remote Storage DVR" (RS-DVR) service in 2006. Similar in operation to a traditional digital video recorder (DVR), Cablevision's DVR allowed customers to pause, record, replay, and rewind previously recorded content. Unlike traditional DVRs, which require a device containing a hard drive to be placed in the home of the subscriber, the Cablevision DVR stored content on servers at company facilities.

To implement the DVR service, Cablevision streamed their existing digital television programming through a second server, which identified requested content, then copied this content and held the copy for a brief period before transmitting it to the subscriber for their later retrieval. At various points in the system, content was buffered for brief durations (0.1 and 1.2 seconds respectively). Content requested by a particular subscriber was stored separately and independently for that person and a replay option was only offered to them.

Upon announcing the new service, Cablevision was sued for direct copyright infringement by a consortium of television and movie copyright holders including Turner Broadcasting and its subsidiaries Cartoon Network and CNN; Twentieth Century Fox; NBCUniversal subsidiaries NBC and Universal Studios; Paramount Pictures; Disney and its subsidiary ABC; and CBS. The consortium sued only for declaratory relief and injunctive relief on the grounds of direct copyright infringement, excluding from consideration the topic of contributory copyright infringement. In its response, Cablevision waived any potential defense based on fair use.

== District court ruling ==
The case was first heard at the District Court for the Southern District of New York in 2007, with Twentieth Century Fox as the lead plaintiff. The plaintiff entertainment companies claimed that the Cablevision DVR service enabled copyright infringement. According to the plaintiffs, the buffering of streaming data, necessary for the DVR service's operation, constituted the creation of unauthorized copies to be stored on the company's servers; meanwhile, transmitting those copies to subscribers allegedly constituted unauthorized public performance under American copyright law.

Cablevision replied that the copies constituted de minimis use of the original programs because they only existed very briefly during the buffering process. Furthermore, since the creation of copies for later viewing was initiated by subscribers, Cablevision could at most be liable for contributory copyright infringement, which was not at issue in the complaint; and since each copy could only be viewed by the subscriber who requested it, the transmission of the content did not fall under the definition of "public performance" in copyright law.

The district court ruled that buffered copies of programs could themselves be copied again by unauthorized users, and since they included entire original programs, they could not be considered de minimis copies. This finding was supported by the 1993 precedent MAI Systems v. Peak Computer, which addressed much earlier practices in which computer repair technicians made temporary copies of files when fixing a particular computer. The district court also found that Cablevision enabled the creation of each copy because it was stored on the company's equipment; while different copies of the same program, if requested by multiple subscribers, constituted public performance because as digital copies they were identical.

Thus, the district court ruled in favor of the entertainment companies, accepting their argument that the temporary buffering copies of programs were unauthorized copies under copyright law. The court issued an injunction that prohibited Cablevision from operating its proposed DVR service.

== Circuit court ruling ==
Cablevision appealed the ruling to the Second Circuit Court of Appeals in 2008. This time, Cartoon Network was the lead respondent. The circuit court ultimately reversed the lower court's decision and ruled in favor of Cablevision.

On the matter of temporary buffer copies of programs, the circuit court noted that the Copyright Act of 1976 requires an alleged unauthorized copy to be "fixed", meaning that it must be both "embodied in a copy or phonorecord" and perceivable "for a period of more than a transitory duration" (which the court denoted as the "embodiment" and "duration" requirements). The circuit court found that the district court had relied too heavily on the embodiment requirement and did not properly consider the duration requirement. Hence, the circuit court rejected the lower court's reliance on MAI Systems Corp. v. Peak Computer, Inc., which did not address copies of files that only exist for a very brief duration of time. This in turn disregarded the "transitory duration" requirement of the Copyright Act, and a buffer copy should be considered transitory.

Cablevision's copies were known to exist for as long as 1.2 seconds, but the circuit court did not establish this duration of time as a boundary between "transitory" and "non-transitory". That boundary remains undefined in American copyright law.

Since the parties to the case had already agreed not to argue the matter of contributory copyright infringement, the circuit court next considered whether the buffer copies of programs for the DVR service constituted direct infringement. This required determining who created the copies. While the district court had ruled that Cablevision created the copies, albeit at the request of a specific subscriber, the circuit court disagreed with this analysis. Per the precedent Religious Technology Center v. Netcom On-Line Communications Services, which established the requirement for "some element of volition or causation" in the creation of a copy, the circuit court found that while Cablevision had some involvement in the process via managing the technology that enabled the copying, its involvement was not "sufficiently proximate" to constitute direct copyright infringement.

The circuit court also disagreed with the district court's finding that the copied programs were transmitted to the public, and instead noted that each copy would only be sent to a particular subscriber who requested it. Thus, the practice did not constitute "public performance" that must be authorized under copyright law. Instead the practice of a single subscriber viewing a program at a later time was found to be time shifting, which is allowable per the Supreme Court precedent Sony Corp. of America v. Universal City Studios, Inc.

== Impact ==
This ruling is considered to be an important precedent for the applicability of American copyright law toward modern practices of on-demand viewing of entertainment programs, and modern technologies that enable such consumer behavior by temporarily copying copyrighted digital files but not keeping or redistributing them. However, the ruling has also been criticized for encouraging abuse of copyright law in its failure to draw clear boundaries when measuring the duration of "transitory" or "temporary" copies of copyrighted digital files.
