= Michio Okamura =

Japanese video game designer

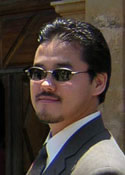
- Okamura in 2002
- Occupation: Video game artist
- Employer: Blizzard Entertainment
- Known for: Artwork for Diablo

Michio Okamura is a computer game developer and artist. He was the lead artist for the popular computer game Diablo, and senior artist on Diablo II. He designed many of the game's characters, including the title character. He is currently the art director for Rumble Entertainment.

== Biography ==
Okamura began his artistic career as a comic book artist on Reggie Byers' Shuriken, as well as Comico's adaptations of Robotech. Afterwards he joined Condor Inc. as an artist working on the Sega Genesis title Justice League Task Force. At the time, Okamura did not have experience using the computer, so he drew most of the art on Justice League Task Force by hand.

He worked at Blizzard North on the Diablo franchise for over a decade. He was the Lead Artist for the first version of Diablo and created the concept design for the majority of the characters and monsters in the game, including Diablo himself.

On Diablo II, Okamura was a Senior Artist, and created character and monster concept designs, including the second incarnation of Diablo.

After Diablo II, Okamura worked as an Art Director establishing the pipeline and creative direction for several internal projects, and then joined Castaway Entertainment in 2004. In 2005, he founded and was president of Hyboreal Games with former Blizzard North employees Eric Sexton and Steven Woo. Hyboreal changed its name to U.I. Pacific, Okamura was the Creative Director. Okamura is currently working as an art director for Rumble Entertainment.

== Works ==
- Diablo II: Lord of Destruction (2001), Blizzard Entertainment Inc.
- Diablo II (2000), Blizzard Entertainment Inc.
- Diablo (1997), Blizzard Entertainment Inc.
- Justice League Task Force (1995), Acclaim Entertainment, Inc.
