= Allen Adham =

Co-founder of Blizzard Entertainment

- Born: September 6, 1966 (age 60); Los Angeles, California, United States
- Education: University of California, Los Angeles (BE)
- Occupations: Business executive; video game developer
- Known for: Co-founder of Blizzard Entertainment

Allen Adham (born Ayman Adham) is an Egyptian-American businessman and video game developer best known for co-founding Blizzard Entertainment with Michael Morhaime.

== Early life ==
Ayman Adham was born on September 6, 1966, in Los Angeles, California, to Egyptian parents from Cairo. His father was a civil engineer specialized in earthquake engineering, while his mother was an entomologist. Seeking to establish a preschool, his parents moved the family to Irvine, California, as it was the only town willing to license them without prior experience in early childhood education.

Adham spent his high school years playing at arcades during lunch breaks and developing games on his Apple II computer at home. Through a high school friend, Adham was recruited by Brian Fargo to playtest the latter's games each summer, first at the Boone Corporation and next at Interplay Entertainment. In his second year at the University of California, Los Angeles, Adham designed and programmed Gunslinger, which was published by Datasoft. Adham took a two-year break during his university studies to serve in the United States Army.

== Blizzard ==
=== Founding ===
While at UCLA, Adham bonded with Michael Morhaime after realizing they shared the computer password "Joe". After the pair graduated, Adham convinced Morhaime into forgoing his job offer at Western Digital to instead found Silicon & Synapse in February 1991, later renamed Blizzard Entertainment. After hiring their friend and fellow UCLA alumnus, Frank Pearce, as their first employee, they rented a small office in Irvine, California, hoping to benefit from nearby technology companies. Adham contributed $10,000 from his college fund, Morhaime took a $10,000 interest-free loan from his grandmother, and Pearce chose to take a salary, rather than invest for equity.

During the early 1990s, Adham offered Fargo ten percent equity in exchange for having Interplay Entertainment contract Silicon & Synapse to port its games onto other consoles, providing the studio with its initial funding to support its transition to making original games. Adham retained 60% equity as the company's initial leader, while Morhaime held 30% of the company. In 1991, Fargo agreed to have Interplay publish Rock n' Roll Racing and The Lost Vikings as Blizzard's first original games. In the company's first years, Adham interviewed candidates based on their knowledge of video games, believing that video games were best developed by their players.

After seeing players struggle with the opening of The Lost Vikings, Adham required that Blizzard games be easy to learn, yet difficult to master. Frustrated that Interplay was insufficiently marketing their games, Adham decided that Blizzard would thereafter self-publish their games with consistent branding evocative of Strategic Simulations' Gold Box video games. Blizzard's first self-published game was Warcraft: Orcs & Humans, which Adham modeled on the Dune II real-time strategy (RTS) video game popular among the studio's staff. In a 2024 interview, Adham advised game developers to design by drawing from other games, rather than investing in original prototypes.

=== Growth ===
In February 1994, Adham agreed to sell the studio, then known as Chaos Studios, to Davidson & Associates for $6.75 million. Soon after, a copyright dispute forced the studio to rename itself, first as Ogre Studios and finally as Blizzard Entertainment. Following the success of Warcraft in 1994, Adham forced Blizzard staff into crunch to release its sequel, Warcraft II: Tides of Darkness, the following year. After Adham announced that a deal to make a Star Wars strategy game fell thorough, staff were inspired to adapt the Warcraft series into StarCraft, though Lucasfilm Games denies that it ever approached Blizzard. During StarCraft's development, Adham hired Rob Pardo in 1997 as a quality assurance tester for his skill at RTS games; Pardo ultimately became Chief Creative Officer of Blizzard.

When presenting Blizzard's work developing Justice League Task Force for the Super Nintendo Entertainment System at the 1994 CES trade show, Adham met David Brevik of Condor, who had overseen the game's development for the Sega Genesis. In January 1995, Brevik pitched his original action role-playing video game, Diablo, to Blizzard executives. Blizzard initially agreed to publish the game, but by March 1996, it had outright acquired Condor, renaming the studio as Blizzard North. Under pressure from Adham, Brevik changed Diablo from turn-based to real-time combat, included multiplayer using Blizzard's Battle.net platform, and removed permadeath. During this period, Adham tasked Mike O'Brien with developing the Battle.net platform for Blizzard's multiplayer servers.

=== Sabbatical ===
In late 1998, Adham tried resigning from Blizzard, but he was advised to instead take a sabbatical before returning as Chief Design Officer, while Morhaime would become president of the company. Pleased with the Battle.net client, Adham had approved O'Brien's pitch for Warcraft III: Reign of Chaos, but Morhaime used his new authority to remove O'Brien from the project amid staff criticism that the prototype was abandoning the series' roots. Rather than be reassigned, O'Brien resigned with other Blizzard staff to form ArenaNet.

In June 2003, Blizzard North executives Bill Roper, Max Schaefer, Erich Schaefer, and David Brevik emailed Blizzard Entertainment's then-parent company, Vivendi Games, threatening to resign unless provided financial protections and communication on Vivendi's intent to sell Blizzard. Vivendi accepted their resignations effective immediately. Adham and Morhaime had declined to participate in this threat of resignation, and in August 2005, Morhaime closed Blizzard North to consolidate staff in Irvine.

=== World of Warcraft ===
Since the 1997 release of Ultima Online, Adham sought to make a massively multiplayer online role-playing game (MMORPG). Two years later, when the Blizzard cinematics department—founded by Adham for StarCraft—sought to make a MMORPG modeled after EverQuest, Adham immediately ended his sabbatical to oversee the project, which became World of Warcraft. In January 2004, only months before the game's release, Adham again left Blizzard amid occupational burnout, handing off oversight to Pardo. In 2006, Adham, Morhaime, and Pearce received the UCLA Samueli School of Engineering's Professional Achievement Award for their work at Blizzard.

=== Return ===
During his second break, Adham started a hedge fund, Tenfold Capital Management, that managed $50 million in investments. However, poor financial returns led Adham to return to Blizzard as head of project incubation in the summer of 2016. In that role, he oversaw Orbis, a planned competitor to Pokémon Go using Blizzard characters, and Odyssey, a survival game. However, the development of both games was disrupted by the COVID-19 pandemic with Orbis strained by scope creep and Odyssey caught between a debate over which game engine to use. When Odyssey was cancelled in January 2024, Adham once again left Blizzard.

== Works cited ==
- Schreier, Jason (October 2024). Play Nice: The Rise, Fall, and Future of Blizzard Entertainment. New York City: Grand Central Publishing. ISBN 9781538725429.
