= David Brevik =

American video game developer

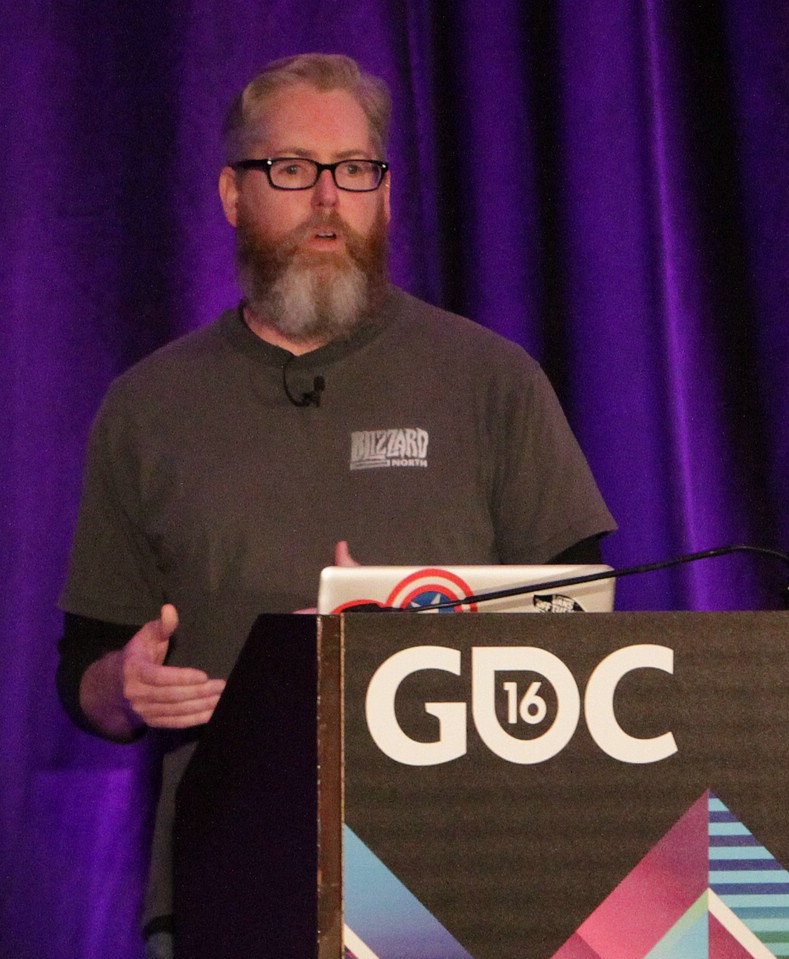
- Brevik at GDC 2016
- Born: February 14, 1968 (age 58); Madison, Wisconsin, U.S.
- Notable work: Diablo

David Brevik (born February 14, 1968) is an American video game designer, producer, and programmer who served as the co-founder and president of Blizzard North. He is best known for the critically acclaimed Diablo series. Currently, he serves as game designer and founder of his independent studio, Graybeard Games.

== Early life ==
Brevik was born in Madison, Wisconsin, on February 14, 1968. His family moved from Wisconsin to Georgia and then to California during his childhood. Blind in one eye, Brevik decided his lack of depth perception would make professional sports too difficult, so he focused on his talent for programming. He studied computer science at California State University, Chico from 1986 to 1991.

After graduating, Brevik worked at the clip art company FM Waves. Upon the company's bankruptcy, Brevik left to become lead technical director at Iguana Entertainment. In September 1993, he formed the video game development studio Condor with his FM Waves colleagues, brothers Max and Erich Schaefer.

The publisher Sunsoft, already familiar with Brevik's work, immediately reached out to have Condor develop NFL Quarterback Club, Justice League Task Force, and NFL Quarterback Club 96. When presenting Condor's work developing Justice League Task Force for the Sega Genesis at the 1994 CES trade show, Brevik met Allen Adham of Blizzard Entertainment, who had overseen the game's development for the Super Nintendo Entertainment System.

== Blizzard Entertainment ==
In January 1995, Brevik pitched his original action role-playing video game, Diablo, to Blizzard executives. The game was named after the Mount Diablo mountain near his childhood home in California. Blizzard initially agreed to publish the game, but by March 1996, it had outright acquired Condor, renaming the studio as Blizzard North. Under pressure from Blizzard, Brevik changed Diablo from turn-based to real-time combat, included multiplayer using Blizzard's Battle.net platform, and removed permadeath. GameSpot named Brevik as 1996's fourth most influential person in computer gaming for his role in the inception and development of Diablo.

In June 2003, Blizzard North executives Bill Roper, Max Schaefer, Erich Schaefer, and Brevik emailed Blizzard Entertainment's then-parent company, Vivendi Games, threatening to resign unless provided financial protections and communication on Vivendi's intent to sell Blizzard. Vivendi accepted their resignations effective immediately, spurring them to found Flagship Studios and recruit similarly disgruntled Blizzard North employees. Blizzard North was ultimately shut down two years later to consolidate Blizzard's staff in Irvine, California.

In an interview coinciding with the console release of Diablo III, Brevik criticized Blizzard for over-emphasizing the game's narrative, modifying its loot system, and implementing a controversial auction house in this first entry developed outside Blizzard North. On a Facebook post discussing Brevik's comments, Diablo III lead designer, Jay Wilson, commented "fuck that loser," prompting death threats against Wilson for supposedly corrupting the series.

== Later career ==
After Brevik resigned from Blizzard, he founded Flagship Studios in 2003 and its sister company, Ping0 in 2006. Once Flagship Studios dissolved in August 2008, Brevik was appointed as creative director for Turbine Inc. (now WB Games Boston) amid its West Coast expansion.

In 2009, David Brevik joined Gazillion Entertainment as its creative director. In 2011, the company's Gargantuan Studio became Secret Identity Studios, and David Brevik was named President and Chief Operating Officer of Gazillion Entertainment. In January 2016, he left the company to enter indie game development. As of October 18, 2016, Brevik has been working as an advisor on the Chinese release of Path of Exile for Grinding Gear Games.

After leaving Gazillion, Brevik founded an indie studio called Graybeard Games. In May of 2019, Graybeard Games released an action role-playing video game titled It Lurks Below.

In 2016, Brevik revealed that he was approached by Sabeer Bhatia in 1996 to form an email company, in which he would get 10% of the shares. Brevik flatly rejected the offer, thinking it was the "stupidest idea." 14 months later, when the company, later known as Hotmail, sold for $400 million, Brevik expressed his regret over that decision, calling it the "worst business decision of my entire career."

Brevik and Bill Wang, a former employee of Perfect World Entertainment, announced the formation of Skystone Games in May 2020, a publishing and development studio aimed to help smaller indie studios with multi-platform releases.

== Personal life ==
Brevik has attributed the crunch culture while developing Diablo II to the end of his marriage and damage to his relationship with his two eldest daughters. After the 2021 California Department of Fair Employment and Housing v. Activision Blizzard lawsuit prompted review of Blizzard Entertainment's culture of sexual misconduct, Brevik was criticized for dating and eventually marrying a female Blizzard programmer after his divorce. During this period, multiple Blizzard executives were denounced for having relationships with their subordinates.

== Works ==
- Gordo 106 (1993) – Programmer
- Aero the Acro-Bat (1993) – Programmer
- NBA Jam (1993) – Programmer
- Justice League Task Force (1995) – Programmer
- Diablo (1997) – Lead Programmer, Senior Designer
- Diablo II (2000) – Project and Design Lead
- Warcraft III: Reign of Chaos (2002) – Additional Game Review
- Hellgate: London (2007) – Game Visionary, Lead Programmer, Story Editor
- Dungeons & Dragons Online: Eberron Unlimited (2009) – Creative Director
- Marvel Heroes (2013) – Creator
- The Nonomancer (2016) – Creator
- It Lurks Below (2018) – Creator

== Bibliography ==
- Craddock, David L. (October 27, 2013). Stay Awhile and Listen: How Two Blizzards Unleashed Diablo and Forged a Video-Game Empire. Digital Monument Press. ISBN 978-0-9884099-0-3.
