= Gordo 106 =

1993 video game

- Developer: Tenth Planet Software
- Publisher: Atari Corporation
- Producer: Efraim Wyeth
- Designer: James Hampton
- Programmers: David Brevik; Joe Jared
- Artists: Erich Schaefer; George Riemann; Max Schaefer
- Composer: Alex Rudis
- Platform: Atari Lynx
- Release: NA: August 1993; EU: 1993
- Genre: Platform
- Mode: Single-player

Gordo 106 (Note: Also known as Gordo No 106: The Mutated Lab Monkey at the splash screen.) is a 1993 platform video game developed by Tenth Planet Software and published by Atari Corporation for the Atari Lynx. Set in the installations of N. Human Laboratories, players assume the role of an exploited laboratory monkey named Gordo, who unintentionally gained intelligence as a result of experimentation with radiation in order to free other animal test subjects and escape from the building, while defeating scientists and employees of the complex along the way. Its gameplay consists of platforming and exploration with a main three-button configuration.

Conceived by FM Waves co-founder Efraim Wyeth before being rebranded as Tenth Planet, Gordo 106 began development in 1991 and was jointly created by David Brevik and the brothers Erich and Max Schaefer, who would later go on to establish Condor before being now known as Blizzard North. Wyeth originally had no set direction for their first title but after meeting with Jack Tramiel in a reunion, he proposed several projects before settling with one that would become the basis of the project, which took influence from Spider-Man.

Since its release, Gordo 106 has received very mixed reception from critics and reviewers alike who criticized its low framerate, overall visuals, audio, controls and gameplay, though some praised the parallax scrolling. A remake for the Super Nintendo Entertainment System was in development by Atomic Games and planned to be published by DTMC but it was never released.

== Gameplay ==
Gameplay screenshot.

Gordo 106 is a side-scrolling platform game in which the players take control of the eponymous protagonist who gained intelligence as a result of an experiment involving radiation across six areas, each one composed of three stages of varying thematic, set within the installations of N. Human Laboratories in an attempt to free his fellow animal test friends and escape from the facility as the main goal.

Gordo can fight against enemies by throwing apples collected in the stage at them, as he does not possess any other means of offense and coming in direct contact with them decreases his health, although it can be restored by collecting bananas. Rescuing the lab animals involves a different process depending on the stages, which must be explored fully in order to find and free them, however if Gordo fall into a pit, the player enters into a dungeon riddled with lava on the floor that can instantly kill their character and inside these dungeons there are also caged animals that can be freed as well.

After reaching the end of the stage, the status screen shows how many cages were unlocked, bonus points and remaining number of lives. When starting a new playthrough, the player has a limited number of lives but more can be obtained after reaching a certain score threshold but if all of them are lost, the game is over. Controlling Gordo is done with the D-pad and attacking enemies is performed with the A button and the throwing angle can be adjusted by holding up or down and pressing Option 1 brings the status screen. By double-tapping left or right, Gordo will perform a running action and he can jump into hanging objects with the B button. While hanging, Gordo can jump into a nearby object with B and holding left or right to do so.

== Production ==
=== Background ===
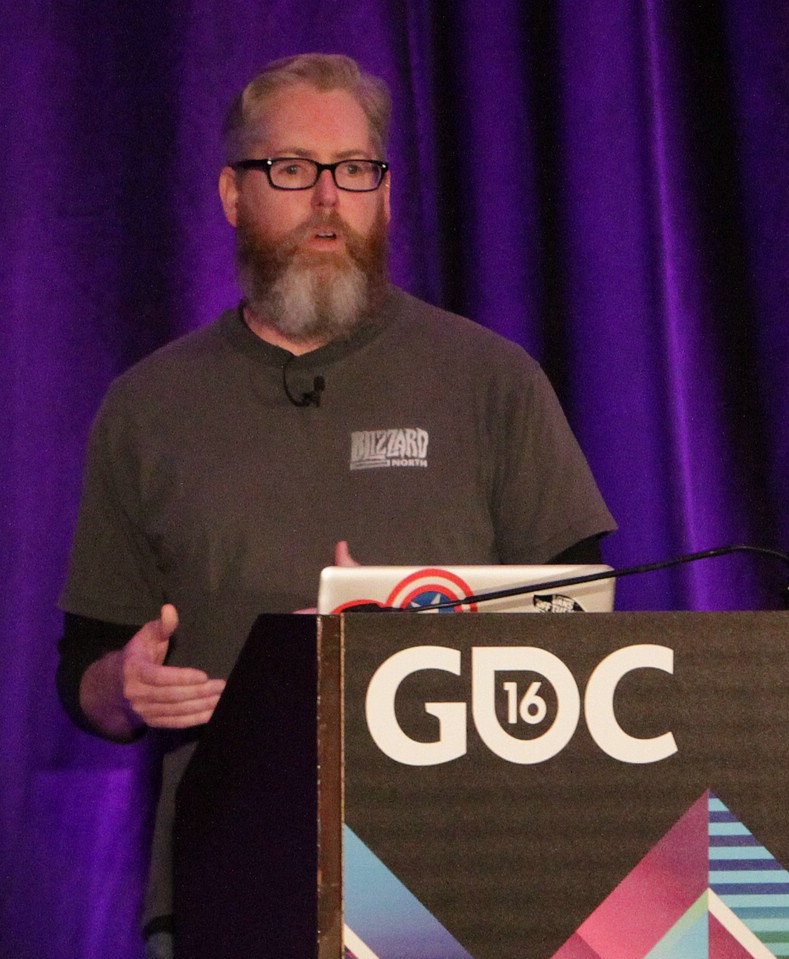
David Brevik at GDC 2016. He, along with Erich and Max Schaefer, were responsible for the development of Gordo 106 on the Atari Lynx.

David Brevik was first introduced to the video game industry during his childhood with the Atari VCS that his father Colin brought into their household and with the Apple II Plus microcomputer one of his teachers kept at his classroom for use with his students, with some of his favorite video games being fantasy-themed titles such as Atari's Adventure and On-Line Systems' Wizard and the Princess, as he was a fan of the fantasy tabletop role-playing game Dungeons & Dragons. In 1979, his father brought home the Apple II Plus computer and Brevik began to garner interest in developing games, learning by himself how to write code and refining his skills, eventually managing to create small programs during his high school period and started having aspirations to devote himself making games as a career. After graduating from college, Brevik desired a job in creating games professionally and eventually enlisted help of a recruiter who came back with an offer to him from FM Waves, a clip art developer co-founded by Efraim Wyeth and Mike Sigal who began to transition themselves into a game development company and needed a programmer for their first project and as such, he joined the company along with brothers Erich and Max Schaefer in 1991.

Erich and Max Schaefer are self-taught artists who were first introduced to video games with a Pong clone console brought by their parents to keep them entertained until their interest on the system dwindled. Both brothers were also introduced to the Apple II Plus began pirating games from their local friends and also exchanging pirated games as well with them, playing titles such as Sir-Tech's Wizardry and the Ultima franchise, eventually becoming fans of Dungeons & Dragons. Later on, the Schaefer brothers were introduced to the Macintosh and due to their exposure with programs like Adobe Photoshop, both had an idea of establishing a desktop publishing company called Desktop Heroes alongside Craig Sarachene, who shared the same interest as them, while Erich eventually wrote an action game titled Death Balls. However the label ceased to exists once the team joined FM Waves to develop clip art before the company focused on the video game market instead with Gordo 106 for Atari Corporation on the Lynx.

=== Development and release ===
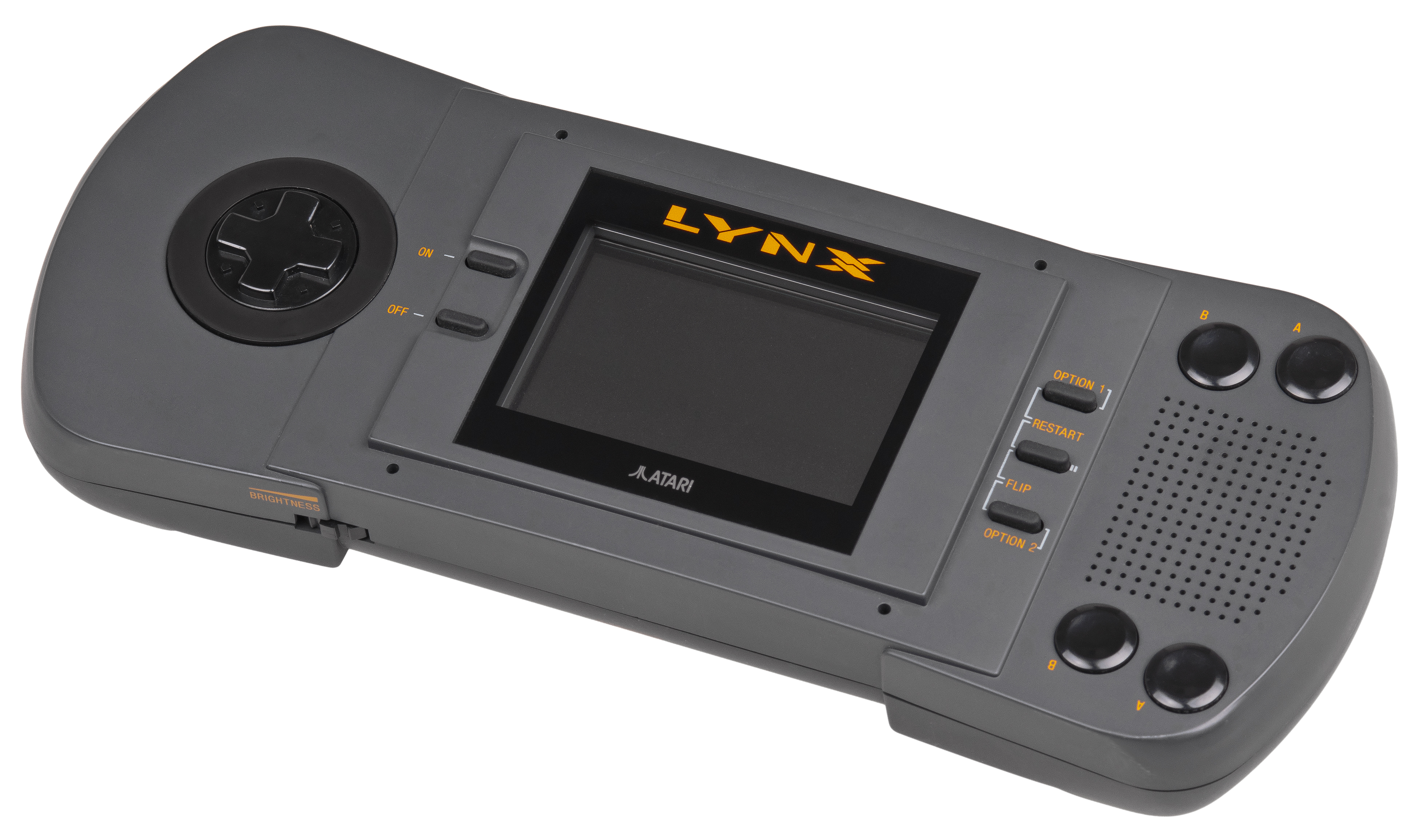
Gordo 106 was developed late in the lifecycle of the Lynx and failed to recoup its investment due to a low install base.

Gordo 106 was conceived by Wyeth after a meeting with Jack Tramiel, who told them if his company could develop a game and after agreeing to do so, Wyeth came up with twelve potential ideas for a game in three days, proceeded to create various proposals in order to showcase them at Atari Corp. and after they chose a proposal entitled The Emancipation of Gordo 106: The Mutated Lab Monkey, Wyeth told Erich to draw art from scratch for the game while also hiring Brevik to program due to his interest in making a professional gaming product and along with Max, the three began working on the project. The team sought to create a character with unique movement, as Wyeth was a fan of Spider-Man, which would later influence the idea of playing as a monkey in the game. Brevik handled the programming aspect during development despite not having experience making professional games, importing the artwork drawn by the Schaefer brothers into a playable form, who had free rein when creating the stages and characters respectively, with Sigal being impressed with their work.

Despite development going smoothly, FM Waves ran into financial troubles due to the expenditure invested on the project and the lack of additional funds from Atari themselves, who were also financially struggling and it would eventually lead to the departure of both Brevik and Sigal from the company, leaving the remaining team unable to finish their work on the project as a result of these events. The company would later be rebrand as Tenth Planet Software, now solely focusing on game development, and recruited Joe Jared to finish work on the project after Brevik departed from the team. James Hampton acted as both producer and designer of the project prior to his role with Alien vs Predator on the Atari Jaguar, although he is not credited as such in the credits of the game. Composer Alex Rudis was also involved during the production of the project and created the music for it, serving as one of his last compositions for the Lynx before resigning from Atari. Gordo 106 was released in 1993, late into the life span of the Lynx; it became the first commercially released game to be created by Brevik and the Schaefer brothers. Due to the low install base of the system and Atari focusing their resources on the Jaguar, the game failed to recoup its investment and eventually Tenth Planet closed its doors.

== Reception ==
Reception

Review scores
Publication	Score
AllGame	1.0/5
GamePro	10.5 / 20
IGN	5.0 / 10
Computer+Videogiochi	86/100
Game Zero Magazine	73.0 / 100
Joypad	81%
Player One	55%
Power Unlimited	80 / 100
Video Games	25%
VideoGames & Computer Entertainment	6 / 10

Robert Jung reviewed the game for the Lynx and in his final verdict he wrote "If the Lynx game library was saturated with run-and-jump titles, Gordo 106 would quickly be overshadowed by flashier, more appealing entries. As things stand, its biggest fans will be players who can stomach its bland flavors and overloaded cliches in exchange for a moderate challenge." Giving the game a score of 5 out of 10. Game Zero Magazine reviewed the game and gave it a score of 73 out of 100. Power Unlimited have the game a score of 80% writing: "Gordo 106 is one of the most fun Lynx games made. It's a great cross between a platform and a puzzle game. The story may be a bit pathetic, but it is a difficult and extensive game.

=== Legacy ===
A remake of Gordo 106 for the Super Nintendo was in development by Atomic Games, a new development company that was established by the Schaefer brothers, after obtaining the intellectual property from Wyeth and was planned to be published by DTMC. However progress on the remake was slow and despite being showcased at the Winter Consumer Electronics Show in 1994, development was cancelled after DTMC went out of business.
