= Icarus: Sanctuary of the Gods =

1998 strategy role-playing video game

- Developer: KRGsoft
- Publisher: JC Research Inc.
- Platform: Microsoft Windows
- Release: EU: 1998; NA: August 7, 1998
- Genre: Strategy/RPG

Icarus: Sanctuary of the Gods, also known as simply Icarus, is a single player role-playing game or strategy RPG released for Microsoft Windows in 1998 by JC Research Inc. and KRGsoft. The game's graphics are rendered and put in three-quarter view.

== Gameplay ==
This game has a turn-based battle system like traditional RPGs of its time. The player can move a certain number of tiles or steps in order to either use a physical attack, or use a magic spell or rest in order to regain mana, or use an item. Each character has their own class, and levels, as well as stats. Each character can gain levels and learn new skills that can aid them in battle. When the characters move is based on their speed stat. There is also some sort of inventory system. It also allows the player to walk around in some towns and talk to NPCs. You take control of eight different characters. There is also a money system as well as a buying item system that allows the player to purchase equipment and items with in game currency. Money can be found by performing certain quests as well as being found by opening certain chests in the game. Every mission is played in sequence in accordance to the story.

== Plot ==
After deities fought over the land Icarus, a god named Tetheus won the battle and subsequently banished a god named Ercanet from Icarus. Ercanet, in revenge against the humans, who sided with Tetheus, has spread his vengeance across the land. The player plays as Dreus, a Coshark Mercenary who, after being saved by one of his mercenary comrades, vows revenge on an evil wizard, who is a henchmen of Ercanet who wiped out all of the other mercenaries. He and his fiancée head out to exact that revenge and rebuild the Coshark Mercenaries. Eventually, Dreus uncovers Ercanet's plan and has to travel to the underworld to save the world.

== Critical reception ==
Reception

Aggregate score
Aggregator	Score
GameRankings	61%

Review scores
Publication	Score
Computer Games Strategy Plus	3/5
GameRevolution	B+
GameSpot	6/10
GameStar	65%
IGN	4/10
Next Generation	3/5
PC Gamer (US)	79%

The game received mixed reviews according to the review aggregation website GameRankings. GameSpot's Chris Gregson noted its sudden appearance after a drought of fantasy RPGs, as well as how extremely average it was. Christian Schock of Intelligamer recommended that their readers avoid the game. GameRevolution compared the game to other titles such as Fallout and Final Fantasy VII. It is also very heavily compared to Diablo or referred to as a Diablo clone. Next Generation stated that "eventually, the story becomes engrossing and the battles downright vicious. If you hang in there, the game is eventually worth your time."
