= Justice League Task Force =

Justice League Task Force may refer to:

- Justice League Task Force (comics), a comic book series 1993–1996
- Justice League Task Force (video game), 1995
