= Diablo II =

2000 video game

- Cover art depicting the Dark Wanderer by Gerald Brom
- Developer: Blizzard North
- Publisher: Blizzard Entertainment
- Directors: David Brevik; Erich Schaefer; Max Schaefer
- Producers: Matt Householder; Bill Roper; Kenneth Williams; Mark Kern
- Designers: David Brevik; Erich Schaefer; Max Schaefer
- Programmer: Rick Seis
- Writers: Stieg Hedlund; Matt Householder; Phil Shenk; Kurt Beaver; Bob Vieira; Chris Metzen
- Composer: Matt Uelmen
- Series: Diablo
- Platforms: Windows; Mac OS; OS X
- Release: Windows: NA: June 28, 2000; EU: June 30, 2000; AU: July 6, 2000; Mac OS: WW: July 26, 2000; OS X: WW: March 11, 2016
- Genres: Action role-playing, hack and slash
- Modes: Single-player, multiplayer

Diablo II is a 2000 action role-playing game developed by Blizzard North and published by Blizzard Entertainment for Microsoft Windows, Classic Mac OS, and OS X. The game, with its dark fantasy and horror themes, was conceptualized and designed by David Brevik and Erich Schaefer, who, with Max Schaefer, acted as project leads on the game. The senior producers were Matthew Householder and Bill Roper. The game was developed over a three-year period, with a crunch time of a year and a half.

Set shortly after the events of Diablo, the player controls a new hero, attempting to stop the destruction unleashed by Diablo's return. The game's four acts feature a variety of locations and settings to explore and battle in, as well as an increased cast of characters to play as and interact with.

Building on the success of its predecessor, Diablo (1997), and improving the gameplay, both in terms of updated character progression and a better-developed story, Diablo II was one of the most popular games of 2000 and has been cited as one of the greatest games of all time. Major factors that contributed to the game's success include its continuation of popular fantasy themes from the previous game and its access to Blizzard's free online play service, Battle.net. An expansion to the game, Diablo II: Lord of Destruction, was released in 2001.

Diablo III, the sequel to Diablo II, was released on May 15, 2012. Diablo II: Resurrected, a remastered version of Diablo II which also includes the Lord of Destruction expansion, was released on September 23, 2021.

== Gameplay ==
Diablo II's storyline progresses through four chapters or "acts", the Lord of Destruction expansion adds the fifth chapter Act V which continues the story where Act IV left off. Each act follows a predetermined path, but the wilderness and dungeons between key areas are randomly generated. The player progresses through the story by completing a series of quests within each act (six per act, except for Act IV which only has three quests), compared to the preceding Diablo which most quests are assigned at random and most are optional. Diablo II also has optional side dungeons for extra monsters and experience.

In contrast to the first Diablo, whose levels consisted of descending deeper and deeper into a Gothic-themed dungeon and Hell, Diablo II's environments are much more varied. Act I is similar to the original Diablo; the Rogue Encampment is a simple palisade fort, with plains and boreal forests making up the wilderness area, and the Monastery resembles the typical medieval fortress. Act II mimics Ancient Egypt's desert and tombs; Lut Gholein resembles a Middle Eastern city and palace during the Crusades. Act III is supposedly based on the Central American jungles; Kurast is inspired by the lost Mayan civilization. Act IV takes place in Hell, modeled on the classical Christian conception with rocks and lava, leading up to a medieval cathedral with demonic features. Added in the expansion, Act V's style is mainly mountainous to showcase the ascending of Mount Arreat by traversing alpine plateaus and icy tunnels and caverns, though there are portals leading to Hellish side dungeons (similar to Act IV), and at the Arreat Summit is the Worldstone Keep whose architecture is inspired by Angkor Wat.

In addition to the acts, there are three sequential difficulty levels: Normal, Nightmare, and Hell; completing the game (four Acts in the original or five Acts in the expansion) on a difficulty setting will open up the next level. On higher difficulties, monsters are more varied, stronger, and may be resistant or immune to an element or physical damage; experience is penalized on dying, and the player's resistances are handicapped. However, better items are rewarded to players as they go through higher difficulties. A character retains all abilities and items between difficulties and may return to a lower difficulty at any time, albeit it is not possible to replay the quests that are already completed.

Players can create a hardcore character. In normal mode, the player can resurrect their character if killed and resume playing, while a hardcore character has only one life. If killed, the character is permanently dead and unplayable. In addition, all items and equipment on that character will be lost unless another friendly character has the "loot" icon checked. Standard and hardcore characters play on separate online channels; as such a hardcore player can never appear in the same game session as a standard player.

=== Item system ===
Diablo II uses a system of randomly generated equipment similar to the original Diablo, but more complicated. Weapons and armor are divided into several quality levels: normal, magical, set, rare, and unique. Normal quality items are base items with a fixed set of basic properties, such as attribute requirements, maximum durability, armor rating (on armor), block chance (on shields), damage, and attack speed (on weapons). Magical quality items have blue names and one or two randomly selected bonuses, such as attributes, skills, or damage, indicated by a prefix or suffix. Rare quality items have randomly generated yellow names and 2 to 6 random properties. Unique items have fixed names in gold text, and instead of randomized properties, they have a set of 3 to 8 preselected properties. Green-named set items have fixed names and preselected properties like unique items, and belong to specifically named sets of 2 to 6 items. Additional properties known as set bonuses are activated by equipping multiple or all items from the same set. These are themed on individuals, like Civerb's cudgel, shield, and amulet, each of which provides individual bonuses which are enhanced if two or more of the items are used to equip a character. It is unusual to encounter more than one item from a set in a single playthrough of the game, so collectors need to play the game many times to accumulate all items from a set or trading for them online with other players who possess them but do not need them. Additionally, items can possess sockets, which can be used to upgrade items by adding gems for various bonuses.

Diablo II includes an item crafting system. An item called the Horadric Cube is used to combine two or more items to create a new item. For example, three identical lower-quality gems can be combined to create a single higher-quality gem, and three small rejuvenation potions can be combined to create a single, more powerful rejuvenation potion.

=== Character classes ===
The five character classes in Diablo II as seen during the opening selection animation. From left to right: the Amazon, Necromancer, Barbarian, Sorceress, and Paladin.

Diablo II allows the player to choose between five different character classes: Amazon, Necromancer, Barbarian, Sorceress, and Paladin. Each character has different strengths, weaknesses, and sets of skills to choose from, as well as varying beginning attributes. The maximum level that any character can obtain is level 99.

- The Amazon hails from the islands of the Twin Seas, near the border of the Great Ocean. The Amazon is akin to the Rogue of Diablo: both primarily use bows and both make equal use of strength and magic but the Amazon can also use javelins and spears. As such, her clan is a rival to the Sisters of the Sightless Eye (also known as Rogues). Many of her defensive skills are passive in nature, especially Dodge, Avoid, and Evade. The Amazon is voiced by Jessica Straus.
- The Necromancer is a versatile death-themed spell caster. Necromancers are the priests of the Cult of Rathma from the Eastern jungles. His Summoning skills allow him to raise skeletons, create golems and resurrect dead monsters to fight alongside him. The Necromancer possesses powerful poison spells, which rapidly drain life from afflicted monsters. He also has "Bone" skills, which directly damage enemies while bypassing most resistances. His Curses also afflict the enemy with debilitating status ailments, sowing confusion and chaos in their ranks. The Necromancer is voiced by Michael McConnohie.
- The Barbarian is a powerful melee fighter who resides on the steppes of Mount Arreat. The Barbarian is akin to the Warrior of Diablo: both are experts with all weapons for frontline combat and both are able to absorb major punishment. As such, the Barbarian is the only class capable of dual wielding weapons. His Combat Masteries allow him to specialize in different types of weapons and also passively increase his resistance, speed, and defense. His Warcries dramatically increase the combat effectiveness of him and his party, as well as afflicting status ailments on enemies. He has a variety of Combat Skills at his command, most of which focus on delivering great force upon a single foe, while some also allow him to leap over chasms and rivers. The Barbarian is voiced by David Thomas.
- The Sorceress hails from a rebellious coven of female witches who have wrested the secrets of magic from the male-dominated mage clans of the East. She can cast lightning, fire and ice spells. Most of the lightning and fire spells are carried over from the original Diablo, the ice spells can freeze enemies solid and bypass resistances while doing less damage than lightning or fire. Nearly all of these skills are offensive in nature by besieging the enemy with elemental calamity. The Sorceress's Teleport spell allows her to instantly travel to a new destination, allowing her to quickly traverse dungeons as well as making her very difficult to hit. The strength of the Sorceress is her damaging spells and casting speed; her weakness is her relatively low hit points and defense. The Sorceress is voiced by Liana Young.
- The Paladin is a crusader from the Church of Zakarum, fighting for the glory of the Light. He was part of the forces that defeated King Leoric's army in the first Diablo, although his Order is eventually corrupted by Mephisto, the Lord of Hatred. To reflect his holy nature, the Paladin's combat skills range from fanatical attacks to heavenly thunderbolts. His loadout is split into Combat Skills, Defensive Auras and Offensive Auras. His auras have a range of abilities such as increasing damage, resisting magic attacks or boosting defense. Most auras either affect all party members and allies or all enemies within the area of effect. The Paladin also has specialized skills for eliminating the undead and is highly proficient in the use of a shield, being the only class that can use it as a weapon. The Paladin is voiced by Larry B. Scott.

Two additional character classes, the Druid and Assassin, were added in the expansion Diablo II: Lord of Destruction.

- The Druid is a shapeshifter with the ability to transform into a werewolf or werebear form. He can summon wild animals such as ravens or wolves as allies and attack with nature-based vines or elemental magic like wind or fire. The Druid offers a wide versatility of skills and can be built in several different playstyles. The Druid is voiced by Michael Bell.
- The Assassin is a martial arts-based class from the Viz-Jaq'taar clan who fights with claw blades and supplements her attacks with the use of shadow magic skills and fire or lightning elemental traps, which remain stationary and affect groups of enemies. The Assassin is voiced by Carrie Gordon.

In 2026, 25 years after Lord of Destruction's release, a second expansion exclusive to Diablo II: Resurrected titled Reign of the Warlock added the titular Warlock class to the game.

- The Warlock is a practitioner of the forbidden art of demon binding. In addition to being able to summon and bind demonic minions, he can also embue weapons with additional elemental and eldrich powers, summon ethereal clones of weapons, or cast chaos spells with fire, eldrich, or entropic elements. The Warlock is voiced by Rahul Kohli.

The player can enlist the help of one hireling (computer-controlled mercenaries) from a mercenary captain in the town; Rogue Scouts (archers with Amazon abilities), Desert Mercenaries or Town Guards (melee fighters with Paladin auras), Iron Wolves (elemental spellcasters with occasional melee capability), and Barbarians (melee fighters with many hitpoints), from Acts I, II, III, and V, respectively. In the original release of the game, hirelings would not follow the player through different Acts, nor be revived if killed. The expansion allows players to retain their mercenary throughout the entire game as well as equipping them with armor and weapons, plus hirelings gain experience and attributes like the player although their level cannot surpass that of their master character. Typically, players choose a hireling that provides something missing from their character class; for instance, the melee-focused Paladin may choose an Iron Wolf for ranged magical support.

In Heroes of the Storm (2015), playable characters Cassia and Xul represent the Amazon and the Necromancer classes, respectively.

=== Multiplayer ===
Diablo II can be played multiplayer on a local area network (LAN) or the Blizzard's Battle.net online service. Unlike the original Diablo, Diablo II was made specifically with online gaming in mind. Several spells (such as auras or war cries) multiply their effectiveness if they are cast within a party, and although dungeons still exist, they were largely replaced by open spaces.

Battle.net is divided into "Open" and "Closed" realms. Single-player characters may be played on open realms; only Battle.net characters that are stored on Blizzard's servers may be played on closed realms as a measure against cheating, where they must be played at least once every 90 days to avoid expiration. Open games are subject to many abuses as the characters are stored on the players' own hard drives. Many cheats that were used on closed realms do not exist or work any longer. Hacks, bots, and programs which allow the player to run multiple instances of the game at the same time are not allowed by Blizzard. They are rarely used anymore. Blizzard cracked down on spambots which advertise sites selling Diablo II's virtual items for real-world currency.

As the game can be played cooperatively (Players vs. Environment, PvE), groups of players with specific sets of complementary skills can finish some of the game's climactic battles in a matter of seconds, providing strong incentives for party-oriented character builds. Up to eight players can be in one game; they can either unite as a single party, play as individuals, or form multiple opposing parties. Experience gained, monsters' hit points and damage, and the number of items dropped are all increased as more players join a game, though not in a strictly proportional manner. Players are allowed to duel each other with all damage being reduced in player vs player (PvP). The bounty for a successful kill in PvP is a portion of the gold and the "ear" of the defeated player (with the previous owner's name and level at the time of the kill).

The Ladder System is reset at various intervals by Blizzard to allow for all players to start fresh with new characters on an equal footing. Ladder seasons have lasted from as short as six months to over a year. When a ladder season ends, all ladder characters are transferred to the non-ladder population. Certain rare items are available only within ladder games, although they can be traded for and exchanged on non-ladder after the season has ended.

The game has been patched extensively; the precise number of patches is impossible to determine as Battle.net has the capability of making minor server-side patches to address urgent bugs. As of July 2016, the game is in version 1.14d. Through the patch history, several exploits and bugs such as item duplication have been addressed, as well as major revamps to the game's balance (such as the ability to redo skills and attributes). Not all patches have affected Diablo II directly, as several were designed to address aspects of the expansion to the game and had minimal effects on Diablo II.

== Plot ==
Diablo II takes place after the end of the previous game, Diablo, in the world of Sanctuary. In Diablo, an unnamed warrior defeated Diablo and attempted to contain the Lord of Terror's essence within his own body. Since then, the hero has become corrupted by the demon's spirit, causing demons to enter the world around him and wreak havoc.

A band of adventurers who pass through the Rogue Encampment hear these stories of destruction and attempt to find out the cause of the evil, starting with this corrupted "Dark Wanderer." As the story develops, the truth behind this corruption is revealed: the soulstones were originally intended to imprison the Prime Evils after they were banished to the mortal realm by the Lesser Evils. With the corruption of Diablo's soulstone, the demon is able to control the Dark Wanderer and is attempting to free his two brothers, Mephisto and Baal. Baal, united with the mage Tal-Rasha, is imprisoned in a tomb near Lut Gholein. Mephisto is imprisoned in the eastern temple city of Kurast.

As the story progresses, cut scenes show the Dark Wanderer's journey as a drifter named Marius follows him. Marius, now in an asylum, narrates the events to a hooded visitor, whom he initially believes to be the Archangel Tyrael. The player realizes that the Dark Wanderer's mission is to reunite with the other prime evils, Baal and Mephisto. The story is divided up into four acts:

Act I – The adventurers rescue Deckard Cain, who is imprisoned in Tristram, and then begin following the Dark Wanderer. The Dark Wanderer has one of the lesser evils, Andariel, corrupt the Sisters of the Sightless Eye (Rogues) and take over their Monastery. The adventurers overcome Andariel and then follow the Wanderer east.
Act II – While the adventurers search the eastern desert for Tal-Rasha's tomb, the Dark Wanderer gets there first. Marius is tricked into removing Baal's soulstone from Tal-Rasha and Tyrael charges Marius with taking the soulstone to Hell to destroy it.
Act III – The Dark Wanderer and Baal look for Mephisto in the Temple of Kurast. Still imprisoned in the dungeon below the temple, Mephisto was able to corrupt the High Council of Zakarum and take over the region. While the adventurers fight their way to the temple, Mephisto is rejoined by his brothers; the three open a portal to Hell, the Dark Wanderer sheds his human form, becomes the demon Diablo, and goes through the portal. The adventurers arrive later, defeat Mephisto, who was left guarding the entrance, and take his soulstone.
Act IV – The adventurers slay Diablo in Hell and destroy the soulstones of Mephisto and Diablo on the Hellforge, preventing their return.

In the epilogue, Marius indicates he was too weak to enter Hell, and that he fears the stone's effects on him. He gives the soulstone to his visitor. The visitor reveals himself to actually be Baal, the last surviving Prime Evil now in possession of his own soulstone. He then kills Marius and sets the asylum on fire.

The story continues with Act V, in the expansion Diablo II: Lord of Destruction where Baal attempts to corrupt the mythical Worldstone on Mount Arreat. Upon returning to the Pandemonium Fortress after defeating Diablo, Tyrael opens a portal to send the adventurers to Arreat.

== Development ==
Diablo II was announced by Blizzard in 1997, with a planned launch in the first quarter of 1998. According to designer and project lead Erich Schaefer, "Diablo II never had an official, complete design document... for the most part we just started making up new stuff." Lead developer David Brevik wanted to fix all of the outstanding issues from the first Diablo, including improved multiplayer, more distinction between the character classes, and building the game more horizontally across a large virtual space of land rather than the vertical, multilevel dungeon of Diablo. The game was slated to have two years of development work, but it took Blizzard North over three years to finish. Part of this delay was attributed to Brevik's focus on gameplay from Ultima Online, and trying to improve on features from that game for Diablo. Brevik also brought in concepts from games like Civilization and Master of Orion, which led to the creation of the character skill tree. The team was given creative freedom to come up with further ideas, often spending time playing video games for inspiration, but this haphazard development path led to the game's delay. After missing a key deadline in 1998, Blizzard North entered crunch during 1999 to assure the game would release by 2000.

Diablo II, despite having less than one percent of the original code from Diablo and having much of its content and internal coding done from scratch, was seen by the testers as "more of the same." The game was meant to be released simultaneously both in North America and internationally. This allowed the marketing and PR department for Blizzard North to focus their efforts in building up excitement in players worldwide for the first week of sales, contributing to the game's success. The cover art, designed by Gerald Brom, originally had a hole in the forehead of the character but the hole was hidden after Columbine High School massacre happened. Over 70 people worked on the game.

A second expansion beyond Lord of Destruction had been in the design stages of development at Blizzard, according to David Brevik, but never reached the production stage. In addition to adding new classes, areas, monsters, and items, the expansion would have brought in more elements of a massively multiplayer online (MMO) game featuring elements like guild halls, what Brevik considered an "ARPG+MMO". Brevik said the expansion was shelved when most of the Blizzard North staff left the company around June 2003.

=== Music ===
The score was composed by Matt Uelmen and integrates creepy ambience with melodic pieces. The style of the score is ambient industrial and experimental. It was recorded in Redwood City, Oakland, and San Mateo, California, from April 1997 to March 2000.

Some tracks were created by reusing the tracks from the original game, while others by rearranging tracks that were out-takes. Other scores are combinations of parts that were created more than a year after the first game's release. A single track usually integrated recorded samples from sound libraries, live-recorded instrument interpretation samples specially meant for the game (guitar, flute, varied regional percussion), and electronic instruments.

While the player visits the Rogue camp, the soundtrack recreates the peaceful atmosphere from the first Diablo game, with the Act I theme "Rogue" reusing the chords from the original Tristram town theme.

Despite melodic and thematic links to the first game, the composers for Diablo II also expanded the sound palette for the game's wider setting. Starting in the second act, defined by its desert environment, the musical direction departs from the series' established instrumentation significantly. In particular, the dynamic range of a Chinese wind gong, or fengluo (风锣), was used in the "Toru" theme to move between a steady, mysterious drone and a harsh, fearsome noise. Mustafa Waiz, a percussionist, and Scott Petersen, the game's sound designer, worked on the drum samples that would serve as the structure for the region's music. Waiz played the dumbek, djembe, and finger cymbals, and Matt Uelmen built tracks around his performances.

Uelmen was impressed by two of the Spectrasonics music libraries, called "Symphony of Voices" and "Heart of Asia," using samples from both in several tracks throughout the game.

== Release ==
The game was released in Collector's Edition format, containing bonus collector's material, a copy of the Diablo Dungeons & Dragons pen-and-paper campaign setting, and promotional movies for other Blizzard games. In 2000, the Diablo II: Exclusive Gift Set similarly contained exclusive collector's material and promotional videos, as well as a copy of the official strategy guide. The 2000 released Diablo Gift Pack contained copies of Diablo and Diablo II, but no expansions. The 2001 Diablo: Battle Chest version contained copies of Diablo II, Diablo II: Lord of Destruction, the official strategy guide, and the original Diablo. Recently however, the Battle Chest edition no longer contains the original Diablo.

Diablo II was released in Japan through Capcom.

=== Support and legacy ===
Until 2016, Blizzard provided limited support for Diablo II, including occasional patches. Although the original CD retail release worked on Windows 95/98/Me/NT4SP5, the current version downloadable from Battle.net requires at least Windows 2000/XP.

Around 2008, the announcement of Diablo III renewed the interest in its predecessor and brought more attention to the many mods available for the game.

In 2015, an unofficial port for the ARM architecture-based Pandora handheld became available by static recompilation and reverse engineering of the original x86 version.

On March 11, 2016, Blizzard released the 1.14a Patch, which added support for Windows 7 and newer, a macOS installer and support for OS X 10.10 and 10.11. Diablo II is not supported on macOS 10.15, due to Apple completely dropping compatibility with 32-bit binaries in this version.

=== Diablo II: Resurrected ===
A remaster of the original and expansion, entitled Diablo II: Resurrected, was released in 2021 for Windows, PlayStation 4, PlayStation 5, Xbox One, Xbox Series X and Series S, and Nintendo Switch. The remaster includes updated graphics, smoother gameplay and re-rendering of the game's cutscenes, and supports cross-progression between the different platforms. The remastered version supports online features for players within the same console family, but not local co-op. Cross-platform play was not available upon release, although there is a possibility of it being included in a future update. The game also features quality-of-life improvements that Blizzard can implement by taking advantage of modern computers and consoles, including support for controllers on all systems, easier means of item identification, and shared stashes of items between all of a player's characters. But the designers also forego elements such as quest markers that are common in modern games, preserving as much of the original experience as possible, and making the re-master almost completely unchanged from the original Diablo II.

== Reception ==
=== Critical reviews ===
Reception

Aggregate scores
Aggregator	Score
GameRankings	89%
Metacritic	88/100

Review scores
Publication	Score
GameSpot	8.5/10.0
GameSpy	86/100
IGN	8.3/10.0
Next Generation	5/5

Awards
Publication	Award
Guinness Book of World Records	Fastest Selling Computer Game Ever Sold (2000)
Interactive Achievement Awards	PC Role-Playing Game of the Year (2001)
Interactive Achievement Awards	PC Game of the Year (2001)
Interactive Achievement Awards	Game of the Year (2001)
PC Gamer	#16 "50 Best Games of All Time" (2005)
PC Gamer	#82 "Top 100 Games" (2007)
Computer and Video Games	#25 "The 101 Best PC Games Ever" (2005)
GamePro	#11 "The 32 Best PC Games" (2008)
Destructoid	#7 "Top Video Games of the Decade" (2009)
IGN	#6 "Top 10 RPGs of All Time" (2012)

Diablo II has a positive reception. The PC version of the game achieves an overall score of 88/100 on Metacritic and 89% at GameRankings. GameSpy awarded the game an 86 out of 100, IGN awarded the game an 8.3 out of 10, and GameSpot awarded the game an 8.5 out of 10.

Greg Vederman reviewed the PC version of the game for Next Generation, rating it five stars out of five, and stated that "Diablo II is a must-have PC title. That's all there is to it."

=== Awards ===
Diablo II earned GameSpot's 2000 runner-up Reader's Choice Award for role-playing game of the year. Diablo II was awarded with "PC Role-Playing Game of the Year", "PC Game of the Year", and "Game of the Year" from the Academy of Interactive Arts and Sciences during the 4th Annual Interactive Achievement Awards. In August 2016, Diablo II placed 21st on Time's The 50 Best Video Games of All Time list. It was placed at No. 8 on Game Informer's "Top 100 RPGs Of All Time" list.

=== Sales ===
On its debut day, Diablo II sold 184,000 units. The game's global sales reached 1 million copies after two weeks, and 2 million after one and a half months. It was awarded a spot in the Guinness Book of World Records 2000 edition for being the fastest selling computer game ever, with more than 1 million units sold in the first two weeks of availability. Its sales during 2000 alone reached 2.75 million globally; 33% of these copies were sold outside the United States, with South Korea making up the largest international market. Warcraft III: Reign of Chaos, World of Warcraft: The Burning Crusade, World of Warcraft: Wrath of the Lich King, World of Warcraft: Cataclysm and Diablo III have since surpassed Diablo II's record to become fastest-selling computer games ever at their times of release, according to Blizzard.

In the United States, PC Data tracked 308,923 sales for Diablo II during the June 25 – July 1 period, including sales of its Collector's Edition. This drew revenues of $17.2 million. Domestic sales reached 790,285 units ($41.05 million) by the end of October 2000, according to PC Data. Another $4.47 million were earned in the region by that date via sales of the Collector's Edition. Diablo II finished 2000 with 970,131 sales in the United States, for a gross of $48.2 million.

Diablo II's success continued in 2001: from February to the first week of November, it totaled sales of 306,422 units in the United States. It was ultimately the country's eighth best-selling computer title of 2001, with sales of 517,037 units and revenues of $19.3 million. Its lifetime domestic sales climbed to 1.7 million units, for $67.1 million in revenue, by August 2006. At this time, this led Edge to declare it the United States' second-largest computer game hit released since January 2000. It received a "Gold" sales award from the Entertainment and Leisure Software Publishers Association (ELSPA), indicating sales of at least 200,000 copies in the United Kingdom.

Diablo II became a major hit in the German market and debuted at #1 on Media Control's computer game sales chart for June 2000. Speaking with Havas Interactive's public relations director, PC Player's Udo Hoffman noted that the representative "had to make an effort on the phone to avoid singing and jubilating" over the game's commercial performance. The Verband der Unterhaltungssoftware Deutschland (VUD) presented Diablo II with a "Gold" award after three weeks of availability, indicating sales of at least 100,000 units across Germany, Austria and Switzerland. It maintained first place for July and rose to "Platinum" status (200,000 sales) by the end of the month. The game proceeded to place in Media Control's top 10 through October, peaking at #2 in August, and in the top 30 through December. By the end of 2000, roughly 350,000 units had been sold in the German market. Diablo II continued to chart in January 2001, with a placement of 24th, and its Limited Edition debuted in second place for February. That April, the VUD presented the game with a "Double-Platinum" certification, for 400,000 sales. This made it one of the region's best-selling computer games ever at that time.

As of June 29, 2001, Diablo II has sold 4 million copies worldwide. Copies of Diablo: Battle Chest continue to be sold in retail stores, appearing on the NPD Group's top 10 PC games sales list as recently as 2010. Even more remarkably, the Diablo: Battle Chest was the 19th best-selling PC game of 2008 – a full eight years after the game's initial release – and 11 million users still played Diablo II and StarCraft over Battle.net in 2010.

== See also ==
- List of PC titles
- List of PC exclusive titles
