= Deckard Cain =

Fictional character from the Diablo universe

- Diablo character
- Render of Deckard Cain from Diablo II: Resurrected
- First appearance: Diablo (1997)
- Created by: Blizzard Entertainment
- Voiced by: Michael Gough

In-universe information
- Home: Tristram

Deckard Cain is a fictional character who appears in the Diablo video game franchise by Blizzard Entertainment. Within the series, Cain is a prominent non-player character who acts as an advisor and guide to the player character of the first three games, and represents the wise old man archetype who provides most of the in-game lore. Cain is the last surviving descendant of the original members of the Horadrim, an ancient order of magicians charged with trapping the series' primary antagonists within enchanted crystals and guarding them thereafter. Cain has appeared in series related media, and appears as a playable hero in the crossover multiplayer online battle arena video game Heroes of the Storm. The character is originally named after the winning entry of a fan contest organized by Blizzard and PC Gamer, and is voiced by Michael Gough for all media.

Cain has received a mostly positive reception, and is considered by several commentators to be an iconic character originating from the Diablo series.

== Creation and development ==
Cain is named after the son of a fan of video games developed by Blizzard Entertainment; his full legal name is Deckard Cain Elder, with his first name taken from Harrison Ford's character in the movie Blade Runner, and his middle name is his mother's maiden name. This was the result of a promotional contest jointly run between Blizzard and PC Gamer in the mid-1990's, which gave fans an opportunity to have their name referenced in the then-upcoming Diablo, and the winning entry was to be drawn by random pick. Deckard Elder's father decided to submit a postcard with his son's full legal name as he felt that it was unique. The Elder family later received a letter personally written by Diablo producer Bill Roper to congratulate their winning entry, as well as a bundle of gift prizes which included a copy of the game and assorted merchandise.

On April 1, 2009, Blizzard announced a new character class for Diablo III called the Archivist, which was soon revealed as an April Fool's Day hoax. According to a post uploaded on Blizzard's official Diablo Facebook account the following year, the original concept of the joke was to create a character archetype based on Deckard Cain, a frail and elderly character unsuited for physical combat. Cain's character model for Diablo III was reskinned and repurposed for the gameplay reveal trailer and website assets. Another prank by Blizzard Entertainment for April Fool's Day the following year involved the false advertisement of a Deckard Cain GPS voice pack for sale as merchandise.

Hero designer for Heroes of the Storm Nathan LaMusga said that Cain has been discussed as a potential addition to Heroes of the Storm by the developmental team for a long time, but the team struggled to design him as a fun and engaging playable character. LaMusga was of the view that he is "one of the hardest heroes to think of design". Lead Hero Designer of Heroes of the Storm Matt Viller noted that about a year before the character's 2018 debut, his team started to take the idea of Cain as a hero seriously as he is a "very iconic character" who is closely associated with the Diablo series, though they faced some challenges in trying to make the character "fun and interesting" to play. They experimented with abilities that incorporate paper-based material like books and scrolls, and decided to shift the focus away from his physical traits into a backline support archetype with abilities such as repetitive usage of healing potions and shooting "Horadric Cubes" which slow the movements of enemy characters. The developers also reintroduced an ability called "Lorenado", which was originally demonstrated by the Archivist in video footage of the 2009 April Fool's Day prank.

== Appearances ==
=== Diablo series ===
In Diablo, Cain first appears in Tristram as the town's elder, where he remains for the entirety of the game. He is encountered standing next to a fountain in the middle of town, where he provides advice, spread gossip, and identifies items for a small fee. He eventually reveals to the player character that his ancestor, Jered Cain, is a leader of the Horadrim Order who personally led the party that pursued and captured series antagonist Diablo. The Horadrim imprisoned Diablo and his brothers, the Prime Evils, within enchanted crystals known as Soulstones.

In Diablo II, he is rescued from a gibbet next to the same fountain in Tristram, and travels as a constant companion of the player character for the remainder of the game. If he was rescued by the player, he offers his service to identify magical items free of charge as a token of his gratitude, but otherwise charges a fee if the player does not retrieve him from Tristram and Cain is rescued by the Rogue Sisterhood of the Sightless Eye instead.

Deckard Cain as he appears in a cinematic cutscene from Diablo III

Cain returns as a supporting character in Diablo III, which takes place twenty years after the second game, and is assisted by his ward Leah. Cain gives written and voice narration for a vast number of lore items found in Diablo III. In the game's storyline, he is rescued from the ruins of Tristram's Cathedral after falling into its depths as a result of a "fallen star" impacting the Cathedral in the opening cinematic, and directs most of the major quests of Act I. By the end of Act I, Cain is fatally wounded by the witch Maghda and her Dark Coven, who seek the "fallen star", later revealed to be the fallen archangel Tyrael. Cain's last act before dying is to use his Horadric magic to reforge Tyrael's broken sword, recovered by the player character, and determines that it is angelic in origin. At the cinematic leading into Act II, Cain is cremated on a pyre in the graveyard outside the cathedral. The player character's early quests in Act II involve hunting down Maghda and slaying her as retribution for Cain's death.

Cain appears in the 2022 title Diablo Immortal, a prequel set years before the events of Diablo III.

During Act 3 of Diablo IV, the non-player character Meshif refers to Lorath, an ally of the player character, as Deckard Cain.

=== Heroes of the Storm ===
Cain is designed as a support hero with good healing, area denial and debuffing abilities, but has weak points when it comes to mobility. Cain can provide reciprocal benefits to other team characters; he receives improved defense abilities when he remains in close proximity to allied characters as a passive ability, and can help facilitate hit point recovery in return by throwing healing potions. The character's "heroic" abilities include the "Lorenado", which sends out a swirling, damaging tome that knocks away enemies, and "Stay Awhile and Listen", which references the character's famous catchphrase and puts all enemy characters within Cain's immediate vicinity to sleep briefly.

=== Other appearances ===
Cain appears in the video game Overwatch as the PA announcer for the Diablo zone of Blizzard World, a virtual theme park filled with attractions and references inspired by various Blizzard-developed intellectual properties. Michael Chu, the lead writer of Overwatch said the opportunity to record Deckard Cain's voice actor again was a highlight of the project for him.

Cain has appeared in a number of media outside of the video games which are set in the Diablo series' universe. Cain's backstory and family history is explored in Diablo: The Order which was published on the same day as the worldwide release of Diablo III. Cain is featured in supplemental products published between 1999 and 2001 by Wizards of the Coast as part of the tabletop role playing game adaptation of the Diablo series. The character is also listed as the credited "author" for the 2012 sourcebook Diablo III: Book of Cain.

== Reception and legacy ==
The character has received a positive reception, and is a popular character with players and video game journalists such as Tom Senior from PC Gamer. IGN ranked Cain as the 9th best Blizzard character of all time, praising the character as an "everlasting icon of nostalgia" and for having "one of the most quotable lines in all of Blizzard’s infinitely quotable universes". Joey Davidson from TechnoBuffalo opined that Cain is "one of the gaming industry's most iconic characters" and that any player who "spent even a blip of time with Diablo knows exactly who Cain is and where to find him". Joey Thurmond from Game Informer expressed a fondness for Cain and other "wise, scholarly characters in fantasy stories" like him, such as Gandalf or Paarthurnax from Elder Scrolls V: Skyrim. Earnest Cavalli from The Escapist noted that Cain is one of the "most famous cryptic old men" in video games and that prior to the release of Diablo III, he was the series' only true recurring character. Devin Rigotti from Red Bull praised the character as a great video game character to get stuck on an island with. He suggested that Cain is "probably the greatest source of lore that exists in gaming" and that it would be great to "stay a while and listen". On the other hand, Steven Asarch from Newsweek detested Cain's "boring, dragging diatribe about the Nephalem and demons" and wanted to never hear his dialogue again. He compared Cain's behavior to that of Navi in The Legend of Zelda: Ocarina of Time, and claimed that he resented the in-game guide in both games more than any foe he faced.

Deckard Cain was a highly requested character for inclusion into Heroes of the Storm. Gergo Vas from Kotaku acknowledged the character's popularity and described him as a "well known unique character" who does not fit into the archetypal "epic fantasy/sci-fi hero” category, and that gameplay mechanics involving such a character would be amusing though problematic to balance. Dominic Tarason from Rock, Paper and Shotgun said Cain's HotS incarnation has some pretty hilarious heroic abilities. Thurmond considered Cain to be a curious yet exciting addition to the game's roster. He suggested that while the wizened scholar may lack speed and be of little use when prevented from utilizing his abilities, his role as a melee support character makes him an invaluable asset to protect with his healing and stat-altering abilities, and to sustain his teammates in battle.

Tarason commented that for most other games in the genre, entirely non-combat and pure support characters like Cain are not very viable. Tarason noted that a solution presented by Heroes of the Storm is by letting individual players be part of their entire team's shared level progression. As a result, most sources have praised Cain's primary role as providing support and buff and heal and slowing the enemy team down instead of confronting enemies head on to be highly valuable. Wesley Yin-Poole from Eurogamer said making Cain a less combat-oriented character has given Blizzard the opportunity to adopt a tongue-in-cheek approach with his dialogue and skills, and regarded some of his abilities to be "nice nods" in relation to the series' lore. He noted that while fans are used to seeing a wizened and elderly Cain who has some difficulty with mobility and that he is capable of casting the occasional helpful spell, the manner Blizzard has designed and interpreted the character's abilities in combat makes him an effective contender while at the same time preserving the original essence of the character. Ali Jones from PCGamesN noted that some series fans have also expressed a preference to see Cain paired with a minor character named Neeve in a romantic relationship.

Elements from the first Diablo game, including Cain's in-universe role, heavily influenced the 2018 isometric hack and slash game Book of Demons. One character featured in the game, known as the Sage, identifies cards and writes lore entries for the in-game bestiary. In his review of Book of Demons, Shaun M Jooste from Air Entertainment commented that the Sage's voice was so close to Cain's, he was almost certain that they are both voiced by the same voice actor.
