= Diablo (video game) =

1997 video game developed by Blizzard North

- Developer: Blizzard North (Note: Climax Studios developed the PlayStation version.)
- Publisher: Blizzard Entertainment (Note: Electronic Arts published the PlayStation version.)
- Producer: Bill Roper
- Designers: Erich Schaefer; David Brevik
- Programmer: David Brevik
- Artists: Erich Schaefer; Samwise Didier
- Writers: Erich Schaefer; Eric Sexton; Chris Metzen; Bill Roper
- Composer: Matt Uelmen
- Series: Diablo
- Platforms: Windows; PlayStation; Mac OS
- Release: Windows; NA: January 3, 1997 (Note: During 1997 and 2000, Blizzard cited Diablo's official release date as January 1997. It first announced Diablo's official availability on January 3, 1997, although the game had originally been set to appear in stores on January 6, and its wide release was reported on that date by CNET Gamecenter. However, certain retailers had broken the game's official street date by January 2. Designer David Brevik claimed in 2016 that certain West Coast retailers had begun selling the game by December 31, 1996.); EU: November 2, 1997; PlayStation; NA: March 30, 1998; EU: April 1998; Mac OS; NA: May 8, 1998
- Genre: Action role-playing
- Modes: Single-player, multiplayer

Diablo is a 1997 action role-playing game developed by Blizzard North and published by Blizzard Entertainment for Windows. It is the first installment in the video game series of the same name.

Set in the fictional Kingdom of Khanduras in the mortal realm, the player controls a lone hero battling to rid the world of Diablo, the Lord of Terror. Beneath the town of Tristram, the player journeys through sixteen randomly generated dungeon levels, ultimately entering Hell in order to face Diablo.

An expansion pack, Diablo: Hellfire, was released in November 1997 by Synergistic Software. In 1998, Electronic Arts released Diablo for the PlayStation. This version, developed by Climax Studios, featured direct control of the main character's direction using the PlayStation controller, as opposed to point-and-click movement. Also, the PlayStation version added a local multiplayer, which allowed players to utilize both controllers for a cooperation mode on a single screen. A Sega Saturn version was considered by Electronic Arts but never released. Diablo has been considered one of the greatest games of all time for its randomized assignment of quests and enemies on each playthrough, online multiplayer, and graphics. The game's success led to several sequels: Diablo II in 2000, Diablo III in 2012, Diablo Immortal in 2022 and Diablo IV in 2023.

== Gameplay ==
Diablo is an action role-playing video game with dungeon crawl elements. The player moves and interacts with the environment primarily by way of a mouse. Other actions, such as casting spells, are performed in response to keyboard inputs. The player can acquire items, learn spells, defeat enemies, and interact with non-player characters (NPCs) throughout the game.

The dungeon levels are procedurally generated with themes for each level; for instance, the catacombs tend to have long corridors and closed rooms, while the caves are more non-linear. Players are assigned a random number of quests from several tiers; these quests are optional but usually offer powerful unique items as rewards and help to level up the character and/or reveal more of the backstory. The final two quests are mandatory in order to finish the game.

=== Classes ===
A warrior in combat with a ghoul enemy. A "Level Up" button indicates that the character is able to advance to the next level; clicking the button results in the character gaining attribute points that can be distributed among the character's stats. An icon at the lower right indicates that the character's head protection is damaged and in danger of breaking.

Diablo has three character classes: the Warrior, the Rogue, and the Sorcerer. Each class has a different level of assigned attributes along with a unique skill. Each class is capable of using almost all of the same items and spells, in contrast to later titles in the Diablo series, which have class-specific items and spells/skills. However, the limitations in the attributes for each class reward play that utilizes them efficiently; for instance, the Warrior's low maximum level of Magic prevents him from learning the higher levels of powerful spells like the Sorcerer.

- Warrior: The most physically able of the three classes, the Warrior is primarily a close-quarters fighter. His primary character attribute is Strength, of which he has the highest maximum value among the three classes, allowing him to equip the heaviest weaponry and armor. The armor available to the Warrior, combined with his higher Vitality, which gives him more hit points, allows him to withstand the most physical damage. The Warrior starts with the skill to repair objects in his possession at the cost of overall durability.
- Rogue: A master of ranged weapons. While not as strong as the Warrior, the Rogue is very effective at attacking enemies from a distance with the bow. A jack-of-all-trades class, the Rogue has moderately higher Magic than the Warrior, so she can make better use of spells, while her somewhat higher Strength and Vitality enable her to fare better in melee than the Sorcerer. The Rogue's primary character attribute is Dexterity. The Rogue's unique starting skill is the ability to disarm traps.
- Sorcerer: A spellcaster, the Sorcerer's primary character attribute is Magic, which can be raised much higher than that of the other classes, enabling him to learn spells and raise them to higher levels. It also grants him the largest mana pool, allowing him to cast spells more often. The Sorcerer is the physically weakest of the three classes, with the lowest maximum Strength, Dexterity, and Vitality, but compared to the other two classes, he can make the best use of the "Mana Shield" spell so that enemy damage is directed to his mana reserve rather than his health. The Sorcerer's unique starting skill is the ability to recharge spell staves at the cost of lowering the maximum number of spell charges that a staff can hold.

In the expansion set, Diablo: Hellfire, the Monk was added. The Monk is proficient at melee combat with the staff. Two other classes, the Bard and Barbarian, were unfinished but remained hidden characters in Diablo: Hellfire, and could be enabled using a hack. Using the in-game sprites of the Rogue and Warrior, respectively, the Bard is capable of dual-wielding weapons, while the Barbarian is a two-handed axe specialist.

=== Items ===
White-colored items are normal items, blue-colored items are magic items, and gold-colored items are unique items. Any items that are not white in color must be identified to make use of their magical effects, although characters can use unidentified items as they would the base item. Magic items can have a maximum of two of these effects, while unique items can have as many as six. Furthermore, unique items can have special properties, or properties not found in the usual prefixes/suffixes for that item type; most unique items have a very rare chance of being dropped, although certain unique items are guaranteed quest rewards. Items wear down through use and have fixed amounts of durability that decrease as they receive damage; when an item's durability reaches zero, it is destroyed. Players can return to the town and pay a fee to an NPC, Griswold the Blacksmith, to have the items restored, while the Warrior can repair objects in his possession at the cost of overall durability.

Bows are the ranged weapon of the game, best used by Rogues. Staves, while capable of physical attacks, are mainly used for the spell charges they contain, as casting from a staff does not require the player to learn the spell or use mana. A staff's spell can only be cast a certain number of times before it requires recharging, usually by returning to town and paying an NPC, Adria the Witch, while the Sorcerer can recharge a staff at the cost of lowering the maximum number of spell charges it can hold. Swords are typically one-handed (though two-handed varieties also exist), while axes are all two-handed. Maces and clubs add a 50% damage bonus against the undead. Two-handed melee weapons allow the player to inflict more damage. Shields, when paired with one-handed weapons, allow attacks to be blocked. There are three classifications of armor: light, medium, and heavy. Characters are also allowed to wear a helmet, two rings, and one amulet. Many higher-level weapons and armor can only be equipped if the player meets the minimum Strength and/or Dexterity requirements.

Books contain spell formulae and cannot be used more than once; reading the first book places that particular spell in the character's repertoire, while using multiple books of the same spell increases the spell level, up to a maximum of 15. A character needs a minimum Magic attribute level in order to read spell books, particularly to raise spells to higher levels, where they are typically more powerful while consuming less mana per casting. Scrolls allow the use of both spells not yet learned and spells not available in book form, but vanish after one use. Many potions are available, including those for health and mana restoration, as well as elixirs that increase attributes.

=== Multiplayer ===
Multiplayer is available for up to four players. Multiplayer characters' states are saved periodically. Players can either be aggressive toward, or play cooperatively with, other players. Players can connect via direct connection, modem connection, Battle.net connection, or IPX network connection. The game lacks the stronger anti-cheating methods of Blizzard's later games and, as a result, many online characters have been altered in various ways by common third-party programs known as trainers and/or game-editing programs such as Cheat Engine.

== Plot ==
=== Setting ===
The setting of Diablo includes the mortal realm which is the world of Man as well as the High Heavens and the Burning Hells.^{:61, 62, 64 & 72} After eons of war between angels and demons, the ascension of man prompted the three Lords of Hell (including Diablo himself) to seek victory through influence, prompting their exile into the mortal realm. There, they sowed chaos, distrust, and hatred among men until a group of magi, called the Horadrim, trapped them in enchanted crystals called "Soulstones". Diablo's soulstone was buried deep in the earth and a monastery was built over the site.

Generations passed and the purpose of the monastery was forgotten. A small town named Tristram sprang up next to the monastery's ruins. When King Leoric rebuilt the monastery as a cathedral, Diablo manipulated its archbishop, Lazarus, to destroy his soulstone prison. Diablo briefly possessed the king, sending out his knights and priests to battle against peaceful kingdoms, and then possessed the king's son, Prince Albrecht, filling the caves and catacombs beneath the cathedral with creatures formed from Albrecht's nightmares.

Tristram became a town of fear and horror, where people were abducted in the night. With no king, no law, and no army left to defend them, many villagers fled.

=== Story ===
The game starts when the player's character arrives in Tristram. Several of the remaining townsfolk assist the player such as Deckard Cain the Elder. The labyrinth under the Cathedral descends from the dungeon/church, to the catacombs, followed by the caves, and finally Hell itself, each with a mixture of the undead, animals, and demons. King Leoric has been re-animated as the Skeleton King.

Late in the game, the hero must defeat Archbishop Lazarus, and eventually Diablo himself. At the end of the game, the hero kills Diablo's mortal form. The hero then takes the Soulstone out of Diablo's forehead after which Diablo transforms into a lifeless Prince Albrecht. The hero then drives the Soulstone into their own forehead, and they contain the essence of Diablo within themselves.

As told in the sequel Diablo II, canonically the warrior was the hero that defeated Diablo only to become possessed. The Rogue became Blood Raven while the Sorcerer became the False Summoner, both of them NPC enemies. Diablo III further retconned the story by establishing the nameless warrior as Prince Aidan, the eldest son of Leoric and older brother of Albrecht.

== Development ==
One of the things that we were trying to get with Diablo was ease of gaming. The NHL series was really good at this, where you just click and you're in the game. Before Diablo, when you created a character, you had to answer 53 questions about this that and the other; you had to name it, give it a backstory and so on. We just wanted to get in and start smashing things.

— David Brevik on the creation of Diablo

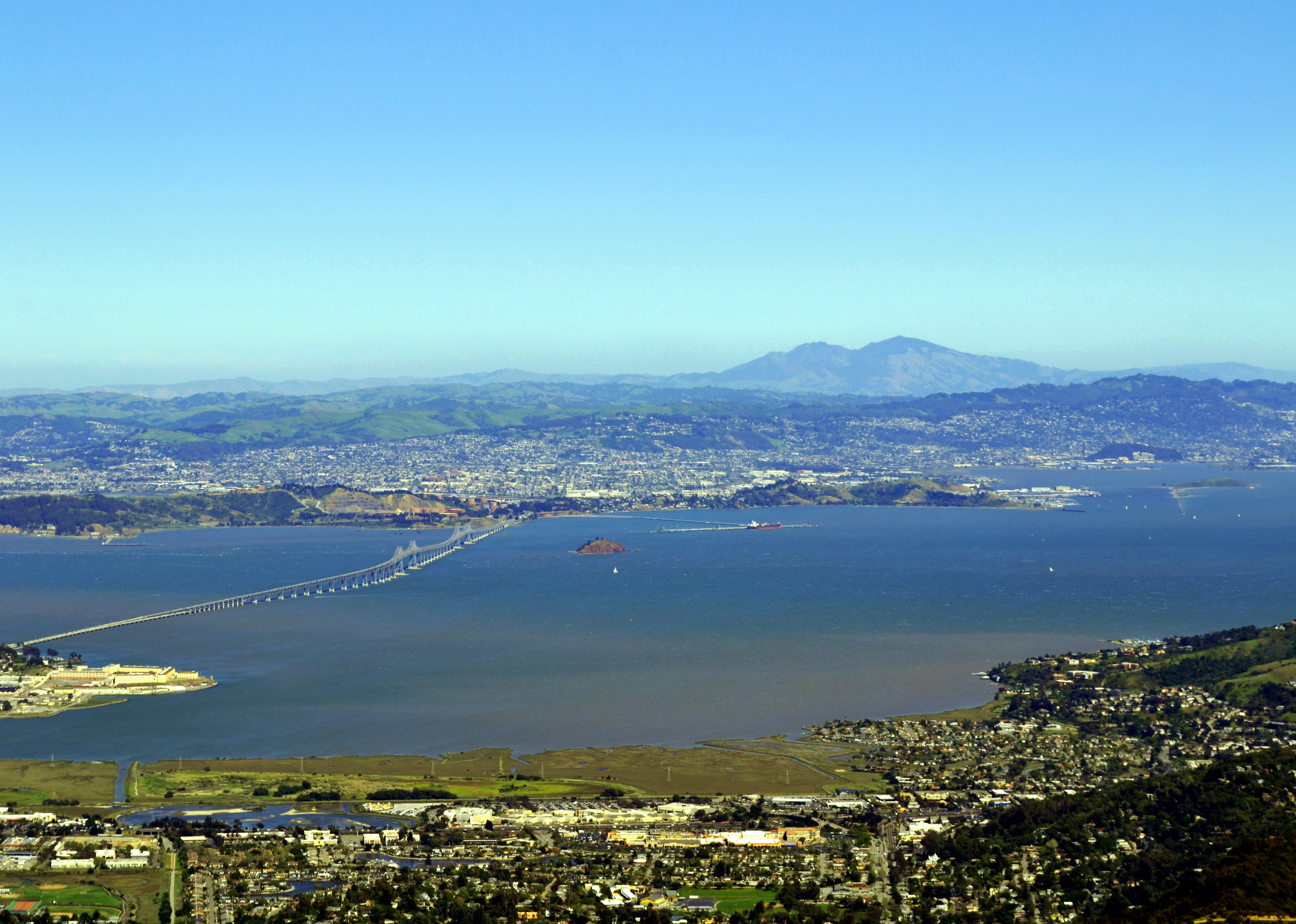
Mount Diablo in San Francisco Bay Area

David Brevik met the brothers Erich and Max Schaefer while working at FM Waves, a clip art production company, and with a common interest in developing video games, co-founded Condor Games with the Schaefers in 1993. Though they initially worked on conversion contracts to port games to different consoles, Brevik had the ideas of creating Diablo from the start, a combination of Dungeons & Dragons and the roguelike genre, particularly Angband, its name based on his family's home near Mount Diablo near San Francisco. He wanted improve how quickly the player would be able to get into the game compared to typical role-playing games. Brevik was inspired by NHL '94 and similar sports games to make it so that players only had to select a pre-determined class and would be able to jump into the game with minimal interactions. Brevik also wanted these classes to be combinations of typical character classes so that players would be not overly restricted in what type of attacks or equipment they could use. A further departure from the roguelike approach was to make the loot system from felled monsters more expansive. Brevik also wanted a "modern and cool" interface intended to bring the quick directness of console games as well as Doom (1993) to computer RPGs.

One of Condor's first contracts was through Sunsoft to develop the Sega Genesis version of the fighting game Justice League Task Force. Brevik attended the 1994 Consumer Electronics Show (CES) to showcase the game and pitch his Diablo to other publishers. Bill Roper said that the team's "initial pitch, in a nutshell, was to take the excitement and randomness of games like Moria, Nethack, and Rogue, and bring them into the 1990s with fantastic graphics and sound". However, most publishers turned down the idea on the grounds that "RPGs are dead". While at CES, Brevik encountered Allen Adham, co-founder of Silicon & Synapse (later named Blizzard Entertainment) after learning they had done the SNES version of Justice League Task Force. The two found common ideas in gameplay development, and Adham showed him a prototype of their first original game, the real-time strategy game Warcraft: Orcs & Humans. Brevik offered to discuss his ideas for Diablo then, but Adham asked him to wait until after they had released Warcraft.

Adham and Pat Wyatt came to visit Condor in January 1995, after Warcraft's release, by which point his company had been purchased by Davidson and Associates and rebranded to Blizzard. After reviewing Brevik's idea, Blizzard offered to work with them on Diablo but requested two major changes, to make it real-time and to have multiplayer, having had done these steps during their work in creating Warcraft. By the end of January, Condor had a contract with Blizzard to build Diablo. Despite Adham's insistence to make the game real-time, Brevik did not want to make this change fearing that it would add extra time onto development, and Condor's development team put the idea to a vote, with the real-time approach winning out. Brevik prepared Blizzard for the potential added development time and to ask for extra development costs, and then on a Friday afternoon as everyone had left, started to toy around with converting the game from turn-based to real-time; within hours he had the basics of the system in place, and was able to show this to the rest of Condor by the following Monday. They kept this news from Blizzard for a short while but eventually revealed how fast they had come up with the change, which Blizzard readily accepted. The game was also originally conceived to be made in claymation (much like ClayFighter), but they decided to have a 3D isometric style instead. Despite the contract, Condor Games lacked funds to fully complete development by the end of 1995, leading to debt to keep their employees paid.

Davidson & Associates and its subsidiaries, including Blizzard, were acquired by CUC International in February 1996. Condor had been in negotiations to be acquired by Davidson a few months prior, and with CUC's acquisition, it was decided to acquire Condor as a subsidiary of Blizzard, allowing the two teams to work together on Diablo. Condor wanted to change their name but did not want to share the Blizzard name directly, and instead renamed themselves to Blizzard North, with Blizzard's original Irvine, California studio colloquially was known as Blizzard South. Around eight months before the planned release, Blizzard South were finishing up Warcraft II, and began focusing on the upcoming release of Diablo. Blizzard did not want to rely on existing online gaming services like Total Entertainment Network for matchmaking. While Blizzard North finished up Diablo, Blizzard South began development of the basis of Battle.net. According to Brevik, when Blizzard South came up to start to see how Diablo's multiplayer code would incorporate with Battle.net, they discovered then that Diablo had no multiplayer code as Brevik nor others had any idea how to write such code. Blizzard South sent employees up to Blizzard North, including Mike O'Brien, at that point to incorporate multiplayer for Diablo and interface with Battle.net over the last six months of development.

Brevik revealed in 2018 that he initially hated the ending because it was the cinematic department's idea and did not follow the story outline he provided them, but after a few days he calmed down and decided the ending was pretty good after all.

=== Music ===
The music of Diablo was composed by Matt Uelmen. The soundtrack consists of six tracks. It was released after 15 years, in 2011.

=== Release ===
Diablo normally requires the original CD to play, however also included on the disk is a shareware version of the software that could be played without the CD called Diablo Spawn. This version of the game allows access to the first two areas of the dungeon, and locks out two of the three playable classes and many of the NPC townsfolk. It is playable in both single- and multiplayer with those restrictions. The demo is also downloadable.

Blizzard had planned to have Diablo in stores before the 1996 holiday season, but even with both Blizzard North and the Irvine studio working in crunch, the Blizzard executives recognized they would not make this deadline while still aiming to release a quality product. The actual release date of Diablo has been subject of some conflict. It was scheduled for release in January 1997 by Blizzard and was widely available by January 6, 1997, but had started shipping to retailers in December 1996, some which made the game available for sale that month. Blizzard marked Diablo's 20th anniversary on December 31, 2016.

In 2019 Diablo was released digitally on GOG.com with minor enhancements.

== Reception ==
=== Sales ===
According to Max Schaefer, Blizzard's initial sales estimates for Diablo were modest. He remarked, "We were thinking that if everything went well, we would sell 100,000 copies." Following the game's positive press coverage before its release, estimates by the team were increased to roughly 500,000 copies, David Brevik later said. Pre-orders had surpassed 450,000 units globally by December 17, at which point the game was set to launch with a shipment of 500,000 units staggered across its initial days on shelves. Diablo debuted at #1 on PC Data's monthly computer game sales chart for January 1997. It held the position for another three months, before being displaced to #2 by X-Wing vs. TIE Fighter in May. Diablo remained in second place until September, when it dropped to fifth. It exited the top 10 that October.

In the United States, the game was the highest-selling computer title of the first six months of 1997. Its worldwide sales surpassed 500,000 units by April, 750,000 by June and 1 million by late November. By the end of 1997, Diablo had sold 670,155 copies in the United States alone. It was declared the country's fourth-best-selling computer game of the year by PC Data. Schaefer attributed the game's success in part to its December 27 shipment date, and noted that "there weren't any other games released after Christmas, so we were the only game in town for a long time."

After being absent from PC Data's charts during the final months of 1997, Diablo took 13th place in the rankings for February 1998. It remained in the top 20 for another month, dropped out in April and reappeared in June. It returned to the top 10 from July through October, rising to #3 in August. For the first half of 1998, it was the United States' 14th-best-selling computer release. At the time, Jason Ocampo of Computer Games Strategy Plus called Diablo one of the charts' "'perennial' inhabitants", and compared its longevity to that of Myst and NASCAR Racing 2. The game's average sale price during the January–June period was $36; by October, it had fallen to $26. Diablo finished 11th for the year in the United States, with sales of 354,961 units and revenues of $9.57 million in the region. In August 1998, Diablo received a "Gold" sales award from the Verband der Unterhaltungssoftware Deutschland (VUD), indicating sales of at least 100,000 units across Germany, Austria and Switzerland.

Diablo's global sales reached almost 2 million units by September 1998. One year later, its sales in the United States alone had grown to 1.17 million copies, which made it the country's seventh-highest computer game seller since January 1993. This number rose to 1.3 million copies by March 2000. Remarking upon these sales, GameSpot's writer Desslock hailed Diablo as an "undisputed commercial blockbuster". The game returned in 2000 to PC Data's annual top 20 for the United States, with 260,020 copies sold.

Worldwide, Diablo broke 2 million sales by mid-2000 and reached 2.3 million by January of the next year. Ultimately, the game sold over 2.5 million units by mid-2001. According to GameSpot Japan, the game was a "big hit" among Japanese players.

=== Critical reviews ===
Reception

Aggregate scores
Aggregator	Score
GameRankings	89% (PC); 80% (PS)
Metacritic	94/100 (PC)

Review scores
Publication	Score
Computer Games Strategy Plus	4/5
Computer Gaming World	4.5/5 (PC)
Electronic Gaming Monthly	8.25/10 (PS)
GameSpot	9.6/10 (PC); 8.3/10 (PS)
IGN	7.5/10 (PS)
Macworld	4.5/5
Next Generation	5/5 (PC); 4/5 (PS)
PC Gamer (US)	90% (PC)
PC Zone	88/100
PC Magazine	5/5
PC Games	A (PC)

Diablo has received critical acclaim, with an average rating of 94/100 on Metacritic. Most praised the game's addictive gameplay, randomly generated dungeons, superior graphics, moody musical score, and great variety of possible magic items, enemies, levels, and quests. This last aspect was noted by GameSpot editor Trent Ward in his review: "Similarly, although a set number of monsters is included, only a few will be seen during each full game. This means that players going back for their second or third shot at the game will very likely fight opponents they haven't seen before. Talk about replay value."

Reviewers commonly cited the online multiplayer aspect as one of the strongest points of the game, with it being described as greatly extending its replay value. Columnist Bernard Yee commented that compared to contemporary online multiplayer games such as Quake, Diablo gives newcomers a much better chance of enjoying themselves, as they can either cooperate with other players or build their character so that they can hold their own against hostile players. Computer Games Magazine's Cindy Yans said that "weapons, armor and items are so numerous that you're always acquiring something new to try... not to mention the game's multiplayer universe"; she went on to say that "for anyone who enjoys a good multiplayer dungeon crawl, Diablo can't be beat". Yans finished her review, "Despite the rather pale storyline, [...] watered-down quests and a fair amount of necessary repetition, Diablo is a must for anyone interested in 'just plain fun.'" Ward stated: "Diablo is the best game to come out in the past year, and you should own a copy. Period."

Macworld's Michael Gowan wrote, "The only downside to this role-playing game is that the adventure ends too soon." Steve Klett's review for PC Games, which was reprinted in sister magazine GamePro, commented that "Diablo's definitely not your typical dungeon hackfest. ... In fact, its closest rivals are games like Gauntlet and Loaded on the PlayStation, but they really don't compare." Next Generation similarly remarked that Diablo is more of a modern incarnation of Gauntlet than an RPG, "but with enough changes and improvements to make it a completely new experience, and one of the best titles so far this year."

Reviews for the PlayStation version generally remarked that while it is clearly inferior to the PC original, it is a much better translation than might have been expected and carries over the essential elements that make the game enjoyable. Most agreed that the use of button combinations and menus was a sufficient solution to getting the complex controls to work intuitively on the PlayStation, and Next Generation went so far as to say that the controls are an improvement over the PC version's, particularly arguing that the auto-targeting makes attacking enemies less frustrating than it is with the PC version's point-and-click. They concluded that "If you were addicted to the PC version, you can experience it all over again on PlayStation. And if you haven't played Diablo at all, check this one out." However, IGN's Doug Perry was dissatisfied with the controls, saying they slow the game's pace. Perry also opined that the multiplayer should have used split screen or the PlayStation Link Cable rather than require the two player characters to stay on one screen, though he said the conversion improved on the PC version in some respects as well, such as the option to double the game's speed. GamePro remarked, "Diablo was graphically stunning on the PC, and some of that sparkle has understandably dulled; the smaller palette and lesser frame rate are PlayStation-port necessities. And while you can't play online, there's a good two-player mode ... If you enjoyed the PC version, there's nothing new here, but if this is your first Diablo experience, you're in for a Hell of a good time."

Andy Butcher reviewed Diablo for Arcane magazine, rating it an 8 out of 10 overall, and stated that "you have a superb game. In terms of design it may be little more than a third-person perspective version of Doom with character development, but that doesn't stop Diablo from being great fun."

Diablo won the overall "Game of the Year" awards of Computer Gaming World, GameSpot and Computer Game Entertainment for 1996, and was a runner-up for Computer Games Strategy Plus's award in this category. The editors of Computer Gaming World wrote, "For this year, Diablo is the game that everyone will remember." It was also named 1996's best computer role-playing game by GameSpot, Computer Game Entertainment and Computer Games. While it was nominated for Computer Gaming World's "Role-Playing Game of the Year" award, the publication gave the honor to The Elder Scrolls II: Daggerfall.

=== Legacy ===
In 1998, PC Gamer declared it the 42nd-best computer game ever released, and the editors called it "a nearly flawless gaming experience". Akira Nishitani ranked it number 1 on his personal list of the greatest games of all time in 1997.

In 2005 GameSpot chose Diablo as one of "The Greatest Games of All Time". It was placed at No. 20 on Game Informer's "Top 100 RPGs Of All Time" list.

Men's Journal published an article in April 2026, for the game's 30th anniversary, highlighting how it is "consistently ranks as one of the greatest games ever made and is widely regarded as the title that popularized ARPGs" thanks to its replayability and dark tone "resonating with fans" of the series.

== Expansions, ports, re-releases ==
The expansion pack made for Diablo is Diablo: Hellfire, released in 1997. It was produced by Synergistic Software and published by Sierra Entertainment rather than an in-house Blizzard North development team. The multiplayer feature of the expansion pack was disabled with version 1.01. The added content included two additional dungeon segments located within a new side storyline, several unique items and magical item properties, spells, and a fourth class, the Monk. There are also two unfinished "test" classes (the Bard and Barbarian) and two quests which could be accessed through a configuration file modification.

Blizzard sold exclusive worldwide rights to develop, publish, and distribute console versions of the game to Electronic Arts in 1996. In 1997, it was reported that Nintendo had struck a deal with Blizzard to publish Diablo on the Nintendo 64. However, this version never materialized. In 1998, a PlayStation version of Diablo was released, developed by Climax Studios and published by Electronic Arts. The game lacked online play, but featured a two-player cooperative mode. Notable differences to the PC version include new lighting effects, auto-aiming for range weapons and spells, and an option for increased game speed. Despite the original PC game being based around mouse control, it does not support the PlayStation Mouse. It features an option to learn the story through a narrator without having to find the books in the game. The European PAL version is translated and dubbed into French, German and Swedish in addition to the original English.

The game was re-released alongside Hellfire in a 1998 bundle, called Diablo + Hellfire. 1998's Blizzard's Game of the Year Collection contained copies of Diablo, StarCraft and Warcraft II: Tides of Darkness. The Blizzard Anthology (2000) contained Diablo, StarCraft, StarCraft: Brood War and WarCraft II: Battle.net Edition. The Diablo Gift Pack (2000) contained Diablo and Diablo II, but no expansions. The Diablo: Battle Chest (2001) contained Diablo, Diablo II and Diablo II's expansion, Lord of Destruction. Later releases of the Diablo: Battle Chest also have a strategy guide for Diablo II and Lord of Destruction, though subsequent releases do not include the original game, instead featuring Diablo II, its expansion, and their respective strategy guides.

For Diablo's 20th anniversary, it was announced during BlizzCon 2016 that Diablo III would receive a free patch called The Darkening of Tristram that recreates the original game. The patch contains a 16-level dungeon, four main bosses from the 1997 version and special graphics filters and 8-directions limited movement like the original game. The test patch was released on November 11, 2016, on the Public Test Realm server.

In March 2019, Diablo was made available for sale on GOG.com, which marked the first time Blizzard had released the game on a digital distribution platform. The release featured two versions of the game: the original 1996 version and a new DirectX-based version built in-house by GOG that features additional display and graphical options.
