= Blizzard Entertainment =

American video game publisher and developer

Blizzard Entertainment, Inc.
- Logo used since 2015

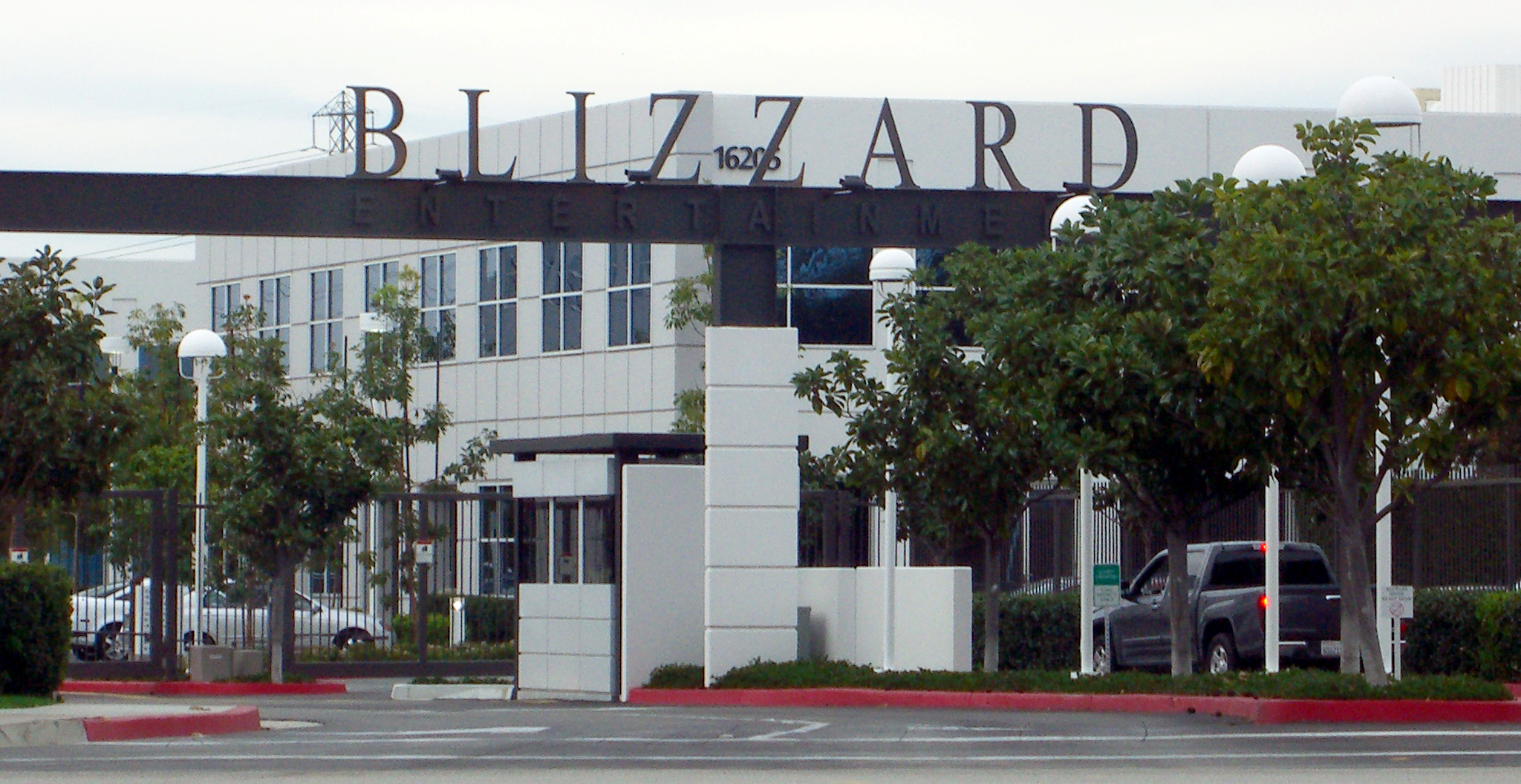
- Blizzard Entertainment's Irvine campus
- Formerly: Silicon & Synapse, Inc.; (1991–1993); Chaos Studios, Inc.; (1993–1994)
- Type: Subsidiary
- Industry: Video games
- Founded: February 1991; 35 years ago
- Founders: Allen Adham; Michael Morhaime; Frank Pearce (Note: Pearce did not take equity upon the founding, but instead opted to take a salary as the company's first hire, though historically he was considered a co-founder.)
- Headquarters: Irvine, California, US
- Number of locations: 9 studios and offices (2025)
- Key people: Johanna Faries (president)
- Products: Diablo series; Hearthstone; Heroes of the Storm; Overwatch series; StarCraft series; Warcraft series
- Services: Battle.net
- Number of employees: 13,000 (2022)
- Parent: Davidson & Associates; (1994–1998); Vivendi Games; (1998–2008); Activision Blizzard; (2008–present)
- Subsidiaries: Blizzard Albany; Blizzard Boston
- Website: blizzard.com

Blizzard Entertainment, Inc. is an American video game developer and publisher based in Irvine, California, and a subsidiary of Activision Blizzard. Originally founded in 1991, the company is best known for producing the highly influential massively multiplayer online role-playing game World of Warcraft (2004) as well as the multi million-selling video game franchises Diablo, StarCraft, and Overwatch. The company also operates Battle.net, an online gaming service.

Founded as Silicon & Synapse, Inc. by three graduates of the University of California, Los Angeles: Michael Morhaime, Allen Adham, and Frank Pearce. The company began developing its own software in 1993, releasing titles such as Rock n' Roll Racing and The Lost Vikings. That same year, it changed its name to Chaos Studios, Inc. and in 1994, following its acquisition by distributor Davidson & Associates, it was renamed Blizzard Entertainment. In 1994, the company released Warcraft: Orcs & Humans, which would receive numerous sequels and led to the highly popular World of Warcraft. By the end of the decade, Blizzard also found success with the action role-playing game Diablo (1997) and strategy game StarCraft (1998). The company became part of Vivendi Games in 1998, which would then merge with Activision in 2008, culminating in the inclusion of the Blizzard brand name in the title of the resulting holding company; Activision Blizzard became completely independent from Vivendi in 2013. Microsoft acquired Activision Blizzard in 2023, maintaining that the company will continue to operate as a separate business, while part of the larger Xbox division; Blizzard Entertainment retains its function as the publisher of games developed by its studios.

Since 2005, Blizzard Entertainment has hosted annual gaming conventions for fans to meet and to promote its games, called BlizzCon, as well as a number of global events outside the United States. In the 2010s and 2020s, Blizzard has continued development of expansion packs for World of Warcraft (the most recent being 2026's Midnight), while also releasing StarCraft: Remastered (2017), Diablo III (2012) and Diablo IV (2023), as well as new material most notably the online multiplayer games Hearthstone, a collectible card game; Heroes of the Storm, a battle arena game; and Overwatch and Overwatch 2, which are first-person shooters. Since 2018, the company's reputation has suffered from a series of poorly received games, controversies involving players and staff, and allegations of sexual harassment and other misconduct against leading Blizzard employees.

== History ==
=== Founding (1991–1994) ===
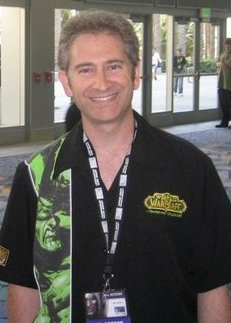
Blizzard co-founder and former CEO Mike Morhaime

Blizzard Entertainment was founded by Michael Morhaime, Allen Adham, and Frank Pearce as Silicon & Synapse in February 1991, after all three had earned their bachelor's degrees from the University of California, Los Angeles the year prior.

The name "Silicon & Synapse" was a high concept from the three founders, with "silicon" representing the building block of a computer, while "synapse" the building block of the brain. The initial logo was created by Stu Rose. To fund the company, each of them contributed about $10,000, Morhaime borrowing the sum interest-free from his grandmother. Their offices were established in a business park near the University of California, Irvine in Irvine, California.

During the first two years, the company focused on creating game ports for other studios. Interplay Productions' Brian Fargo was friends with Adham and had a 10% stake in Silicon & Synapse. Fargo provided the company with conversion contacts for the games Interplay was publishing, starting with Battle Chess. Other titles included Ports include titles such as J.R.R. Tolkien's The Lord of the Rings, Vol. I and Battle Chess II: Chinese Chess. Fargo then enlisted Silicon & Synapse around 1991 to help develop RPM Racing that Interplay was preparing for the launch of the Super Nintendo Entertainment System. Fargo remained impressed with Silicon & Synapse's work, and provided them the ability to write their own games to be published by Interplay. The first two titles developed solely by the company were Rock n' Roll Racing, a sequel to RPM Racing, and The Lost Vikings inspired by Lemmings.

Around 1993, co-founder Adham told the other executives that he did not like the name "Silicon & Synapse" anymore, as outsiders were confusing the element silicon used in microchips with silicone polymer of breast implants. By the end of 1993, Adham changed the name to "Chaos Studios," reflecting on the haphazardness of their development processes.

Near this same time, the company started to explore options in publishing their own games, as their conversion contracts were not as lucrative for the company. Inspired by the multiplayer aspects of Westwood Studios' Dune II and the high fantasy setting of The Lord of the Rings, the company began work on what would become Warcraft: Orcs & Humans. Adham saw this as a start of a series of interconnected titles, similar to the Gold Box series by Strategic Simulations. To support its development and keep the company afloat, the studio took several more conversion contracts, though the founders were going into debt to keep their twelve developers employed. Davidson & Associates, a company that published educational software and which had previously employed Silicon & Synapse for conversion contracts, made an offer to buy the company for $4 million. Interplay was negotiating to be the publisher for Warcraft, and Fargo cautioned Adham and Morhaime against selling the company. Adham and Morhiame rejected Davidson & Associates' initial offer, but the company came back with another offer of $6.75 million (equivalent to $14.7 million in 2025), assuring to the founders that they would have creative control over the games they developed. Adham and Morhaime accepted the offer in early 1994.

Shortly after the sale, it was contacted by a Florida company, Chaos Technologies, who claimed its trademark rights on the name "Chaos" and wanted the company to pay US$100,000 (equivalent to $217,220 in 2025) to keep the name. Not wanting to pay that sum, the executives decided to change the studio's name to "Ogre Studios" by April 1994. However, Davidson & Associates did not like this name, and forced the company to change it. According to Morhaime, Adham began running through a dictionary from the start, writing down any word that seemed interesting and passing it to the legal department to see if it had any complications. One of the first words they found to be interesting and cleared the legal check was "blizzard", leading them to change their name to "Blizzard Entertainment" by May 1994. Warcraft was released in November 1994, and within a year, helped to establish Blizzard among other development studios like Westwood.

=== Acquisition by Vivendi and World of Warcraft (1995–2007) ===
Blizzard Entertainment has changed hands several times since then. Davidson was acquired along with Sierra On-Line by a company called CUC International in 1996. CUC then merged with a hotel, real-estate, and car-rental franchiser called HFS Corporation to form Cendant in 1997. In 1998 it became apparent that CUC had engaged in accounting fraud for years before the merger. Cendant's stock lost 80% of its value over the next six months in the ensuing widely discussed accounting scandal. The company sold its consumer software operations, Sierra On-line (which included Blizzard) to French publisher Havas in 1998, the same year Havas was purchased by Vivendi. Blizzard, at this point numbering about 200 employees, became part of the Vivendi Games group of Vivendi.

In 1996, Blizzard Entertainment acquired Condor Games of San Mateo, California, which had been working on the action role-playing game (ARPG) Diablo for Blizzard at the time, and was led by David Brevik and brothers Max and Erick Schaefer. Condor was renamed Blizzard North, with Blizzard's existing Irvine studios colloquially referred as Blizzard South. Diablo was released at the very start of 1997 alongside Battle.net, a matchmaking service for the game. Blizzard North developed the sequel Diablo II (2000), and its expansion pack Lord of Destruction (2001).

Following the success of Warcraft II: Tides of Darkness, Blizzard began development on a science fiction-themed RTS, StarCraft, and released the title in March 1998. The title was the top-selling PC game for the year, and led to further growth of the Battle.net service and the use of the game for esports. Around 2000, Blizzard engaged with Nihilistic Software to work on a version of StarCraft for home consoles for Blizzard. Nihilisitic was co-founded by Robert Huebner, who had worked on StarCraft and other games while a Blizzard employee before leaving to found the studio. The game, StarCraft: Ghost, was a stealth-oriented game compared to the RTS features of StarCraft, and was a major feature of the 2002 Tokyo Game Show. However, over the next few years, the game entered development hell with conflicts between Nihilisitic and Blizzard on its direction. Blizzard ordered Nihilistic to stop work on StarCraft: Ghost in July 2004, and instead brought on Swingin' Ape Studios, a third-party studio that had just successfully released Metal Arms: Glitch in the System in 2003, to reboot the development of Ghost. Blizzard fully acquired Swingin' Ape Studios in May 2005 to continue on Ghost. However, while the game was scheduled to be released in 2005, it was targeted at the consoles of the sixth generation, such as the PlayStation 2 and original Xbox, while the industry was transitioning to the seventh generation. Blizzard decided to cancel Ghost rather than extend its development period to work on the newer consoles.

Blizzard started to work on a sequel to the Warcraft II in early 1998, which was announced as a "role-playing strategy" game. Warcraft III: Reign of Chaos, the third title set in the Warcraft fictional universe, was released in July 2002. Warcraft III has inspired many future games, having the influence on real-time strategy and multiplayer online battle arena genre. Many of the characters, locations and concepts introduced in Warcraft III and its expansion went on to play major roles in numerous future Blizzard's titles.

In 2002, Blizzard was able to reacquire rights for three of its earlier Silicon & Synapse titles, The Lost Vikings, Rock n' Roll Racing and Blackthorne, from Interplay Entertainment and re-release them for the Game Boy Advance handheld console.

Around 2003, Blizzard North was working on Diablo III as well as planned science-fiction-based version dubbed Starblo. Amid rumors that Vivendi was looking to sell its gaming division around 2003, Blizzard North's leadership, consisting of Brevik, the Schaefers, and Bill Roper, asked Blizzard to provide their studio protections from the potential sale, or else they would resign. After several rounds of tense communications, the four gave their resignations to Blizzard's management on June 30, 2003. As part of this, a significant portion of Blizzard North's staff were laid off, additional work on Starblo was terminated and the remaining team focused on Diablo III. Blizzard's management made the decision August 2005 to consolidate Blizzard North into Blizzard Entertainment, relocating staff to the main Blizzard offices in Irvine.

In 2004, Blizzard opened European offices in the Paris suburb of Vélizy, Yvelines, France.

Blizzard began work on World of Warcraft near the end of 1999, a massively multiplayer online role-playing game (MMORPG) based on the Warcraft franchise, with gameplay inspired by EverQuest. The game was publicly announced in September 2001. The excitement by the media for World of Warcraft led to significant growth with Team 2 from forty to the hundreds, as well as a large amount of crunch development to complete the game. In January 2004, Adham announced he was leaving the company from being burnt out over his work on World of Warcraft, transferring management to Morhaime. World of Warcraft was released on November 23, 2004, in North America, and on February 11, 2005, in Europe. By December 2004, the game was the fastest-selling PC game in the United States, and by March 2005, had reached 1.5 million subscribers worldwide. Blizzard partnered with Chinese publisher The9 to publish and distribute World of Warcraft in China, as foreign companies could not directly publish into the country themselves. World of Warcraft launched in China in June 2005. By the end of 2007, World of Warcraft was considered a global phenomenon, having reached over 9 million subscribers and exceeded US$1 billion in revenue since its release. In April 2008, World of Warcraft was estimated to hold 62 percent of the MMORPG subscription market.

With the success of World of Warcraft, Blizzard Entertainment organized the first BlizzCon fan convention in October 2005 held at the Anaheim Convention Center. The inaugural event drew about 6,000 people and became an annual event which Blizzard uses to announce new games, expansions, and content for its properties.

Blizzard's staff quadrupled from around 400 employees in 2004 to 1600 by 2006 to provide more resources to World of Warcraft and its various expansions. To deal with its growing staff, Blizzard moved their headquarters from the UCI Research Park campus to a newly constructed 240,000-square foot campus in Irvine that was formerly occupied by Broadcom and before that by AST Research; the former Research Park site was taken over by Linksys. Blizzard's new base was completed by March 2008; the city named the primary street on this campus as 1 Blizzard Way to honor the company. The campus includes a twelve-foot tall bronze statue of a Warcraft orc riding a wolf, with plaques surrounding it representing the eight company values by that point, "Gameplay First", "Commit to Quality", "Play Nice; Play Fair", "Embrace Your Inner Geek", "Learn & Grow", "Every Voice Matters", "Think Globally", and "Lead Responsibly".

=== Vivendi merger with Activision and continued growth (2008–2017) ===
Up through 2006, Bobby Kotick, the CEO of Activision, had been working to rebound the company from near-bankruptcy, and had established a number of new studios. However, Activision lacked anything in the MMO market. Kotick saw that World of Warcraft was bringing in over US$1.1 billion a year in subscription fees, and began approaching Vivendi's CEO Jean-Bernard Lévy about potential acquisition of their struggling Vivendi Games division, which included Blizzard Entertainment. Lévy was open to a merger, but would only allow it if he controlled the majority of the combined company, knowing the value of World of Warcraft to Kotick. Among those Kotick spoke to for advice included Blizzard's Morhaime, who told Kotick that they had begun establishing lucrative in-roads into the Chinese market. Kotick accepted Lévy's deal, with the deal approved by shareholders in December 2007. By July 2008, the merger was complete, with Vivendi Games effectively dissolved except for Blizzard Entertainment, and the new company was named Activision Blizzard.

Blizzard established a distribution agreement with the Chinese company NetEase in August 2008 to publish Blizzard's games in China. The deal focused on StarCraft II which was gaining popularity as an esport within southeast Asia, as well as for other Blizzard games with the exception of World of Warcraft, still being handled by The9. The two companies established the Shanghai EaseNet Network Technology for managing the games within China. Blizzard and The9 prepared to launch the World of Warcraft expansion Wrath of the Lich King, but the expansion came under scrutiny by China's content regulation board, the General Administration of Press and Publication, which rejected publication of it within China in March 2009, even with preliminary modifications made by The9 to clear it. Rumors of Blizzard's dissatisfaction with The9 from this and other previous complications with World of Warcraft came to a head when, in April 2009, Blizzard announced it was terminating its contract with The9, and transferred operation of World of Warcraft in China to NetEase.

They released an improved version of Battle.net (Battle.net 2.0) in March 2009 which included improved matchmaking, storefront features, and better support for all of Blizzard's existing titles particularly World of Warcraft.

Having peaked at 12 million monthly subscriptions in 2010, World of Warcraft subscriptions sunk to 6.8 million in 2014, the lowest number since the end of 2006, prior to The Burning Crusade expansion. However, World of Warcraft is still the world's most-subscribed MMORPG, and holds the Guinness World Record for the most popular MMORPG by subscribers. In 2008, Blizzard was honored at the 59th Annual Technology & Engineering Emmy Awards for the creation of World of Warcraft. Mike Morhaime accepted the award.

Following the merger, Blizzard found it was relying on its well-established properties, but at the same time, the industry was experiencing a shift towards indie games. Blizzard established a few small teams within the company to work on developing new concepts based on the indie development approach that it could potentially use. One of these teams quickly came onto the idea of a collectible card game based on the Warcraft narrative universe, which ultimately became Hearthstone, released as a free-to-play title in March 2014. Hearthstone reached over 25 million players by the end of 2014, and exceeded 100 million players by 2018.

Another small internal team began work around 2008 on a new intellectual property known as Titan, a more contemporary or near-future MMORPG that would have co-existed alongside World of Warcraft. The project gained more visibility in 2010 as a result of some information leaks. Blizzard continued to speak on Titan's development over the next few years, with over 100 people within Blizzard working on the project. However, Titan's development was troubled, and, internally, in May 2013, Blizzard cancelled the project (publicly reporting this in 2014), and reassigned most of the staff but left about 40 people, led by Jeff Kaplan, to either come up with a fresh idea within a few weeks or have their team reassigned to Blizzard's other departments. The small team came upon the idea of a team-based multiplayer shooter game, reusing many of the assets from Titan but set in a new near-future narrative. The new project was greenlit by Blizzard and became known as Overwatch, which was released in May 2016. Overwatch became the fourth main intellectual property of Blizzard, following Warcraft, StarCraft, and Diablo.

In addition to Hearthstone and Overwatch, Blizzard Entertainment continued to produce sequels and expansions to its established properties during this period, including StarCraft II: Wings of Liberty (2010) and Diablo III (2012). Their major crossover title, Heroes of the Storm, was released as a MOBA game in 2015. The game featured various characters from Blizzard's franchises as playable heroes, as well as different battlegrounds based on Warcraft, Diablo, StarCraft, and Overwatch universes. In the late 2010s, Blizzard released StarCraft: Remastered (2017) and Warcraft III: Reforged (2020), remastered versions of the original StarCraft and Warcraft III, respectively.

The May 2016 release of Overwatch was highly successful, and was the highest-selling game on PC for 2016. Several traditional esport events had been established within the year of Overwatch's release, such as the Overwatch World Cup, but Blizzard continued to expand this and announced the first esports professional league, the Overwatch League at the 2016 BlizzCon event. The company purchased a studio at The Burbank Studios in Burbank, California, that it converted into a dedicated esports venue, Blizzard Arena, to be used for the Overwatch League and other events. The inaugural season of the Overwatch League launched on January 10, 2018, with 12 global teams playing. By the second season in 2019 it had expanded the League to 20 teams, and with its third season in 2020, it will have these teams traveling across the globe in a transitional home/away-style format.

In 2012, Blizzard Entertainment had 4,700 employees, with offices across 11 cities including Austin, Texas, and countries around the globe. As of June 2015, the company's headquarters in Irvine, California had 2,622 employees.

=== Change of leadership (2018–2022) ===
By 2018, a rift had developed between Kotick and Morhaime on how Blizzard should continue developing its games, with Morhaime wanting to allow the developers the freedom to experiment while Kotick was focused on generating profit. Morhaime had considered resigning in 2017 but Kotick convinced him to stay on. Morhaime announced his plans to step down as the company president and CEO On October 3, 2018, while remaining an advisor to the company. Morhaime stated publicly that he felt it was time for someone else to lead Blizzard, but those close to him said he had become tired of the conflicts with Kotick. Morhaime formally left on April 7, 2019, and was replaced by J. Allen Brack, the executive producer on World of Warcraft.

In February 2019, Kotick announced a company-wide layoff of 8% of Activision Blizzard staff, around 800 total positions, due to lower revenues in 2018; this included a significant portion of Blizzard Entertainment, which had rising head count over the years. Blizzard was planning for the announcement of Diablo IV and Overwatch 2 at the 2019 Blizzcon, and to keep the company focused, two other projects, codenamed Ares and Orion, were cancelled.

Frank Pearce announced he would be stepping down as Blizzard's Chief Development Officer on July 19, 2019, though will remain in an advisory role similar to Morhaime. Michael Chu, lead writer on many of Blizzard's franchises including Diablo, Warcraft, and Overwatch, announced he was leaving the company after 20 years in March 2020.

On January 22, 2021, Activision transferred Vicarious Visions over to Blizzard Entertainment, stating that the Vicarious Visions team had better opportunity for long-term support for Blizzard. Vicarious had been working with Blizzard for about two years prior to this announcement on the planned remaster of Diablo II, Diablo II: Resurrected, and according to Brack, it made sense to incorporate Vicarious into Blizzard for ongoing support of the game and for other Diablo games including Diablo IV. Vicarious was completely merged into Blizzard by April 12, 2022, thereby being renamed Blizzard Albany.

In celebration of the company's 30th anniversary, Blizzard Entertainment released a compilation called Blizzard Arcade Collection in February 2021, for various video game platforms. The collection includes its three classic video games: The Lost Vikings, Rock n' Roll Racing, and Blackthorne, each of which containing additional upgrades and numerous modern features.

Activision Blizzard was the subject of a lawsuit from the California Department of Fair Employment and Housing in July 2021, asserting that for several years the management within Blizzard as well as Activision promoted a "frat boy" atmosphere that allowed and encouraged sexual misconduct towards female employees and discrimination in hiring practices. The lawsuit drew a large response from employees and groups outside of Activision Blizzard. In the wake of these events, Brack, one of the few individuals directly named in the suit, announced he was leaving Blizzard to "pursue new opportunities", and will be replaced by co-leads Jen Oneal, the lead of Vicarious Visions and the first woman in a leadership role for the company, and Mike Ybarra, a Blizzard executive vice president. Oneal announced in November 2021 that she would be leaving the company by the end of 2021, leaving Ybarra as the sole leader of Blizzard.

As a result of the California lawsuit and of delays and release issues with its more recent games, Activision Blizzard's stock faced severe pressure. Subsequently, Microsoft seized the opportunity to become one of the largest video game companies in the world and announced its intent to acquire Activision Blizzard and its subsidiaries, including Blizzard, for $68.7 billion in January 2022. This exchange marks the largest acquisition in tech history, surpassing the $67 billion Dell-EMC merger from 2016. The deal closed on October 13, 2023, and Activision Blizzard moved into the Microsoft Gaming division.

Blizzard acquired Proletariat, the developers of Spellbreak, in June 2022 as to help support World of Warcraft. The 100-employee studio remained in Boston but will shutter Spellbreak as it moves onto Warcraft.

=== Challenges with NetEase and Microsoft acquisition (2022–present) ===
Ahead of its license renewal in January 2023, Blizzard (via Activision Blizzard) and NetEase stated in November 2022 that it had been unable to come to an agreement on the renewal terms for its license, and thus most Blizzard games will cease operations in China in January 2023 until the situation can be resolved. According to a report by The New York Times, several factors influenced Activision Blizzard's decision to terminate the agreement, which included stronger demands made by the Chinese government to know of Activision Blizzard's internal business matters, NetEase's desire to license the games directly rather than run the license through a joint venture, and Activision Blizzard's concerns that NetEase was trying to start its own ventures, including the $100 million payment towards Bungie in 2018. NetEase was further concerned about the impact of the pending acquisition of Activision Blizzard by Microsoft. Activision Blizzard stated it was looking to other Chinese firms as replacements for NetEase as to restore its games in China.

By April 2024, Blizzard, with Microsoft's help, and NetEase had agreed to new publishing terms, with plans to bring back Blizzard's games to China by mid-2024, maintaining all prior game ownership from the original publishing deal. Under this new deal, NetEase also will be able to bring games to the Xbox platform.

Following completion of the acquisition, Microsoft announced it was laying off 1,900 staff from Microsoft Gaming on January 25, 2024. Alongside this, Blizzard President Mike Ybarra and Chief Design Officer Allen Adham announced they would be leaving the company. Further, the planned survival game from Blizzard was canceled. On January 29, 2024, Johanna Faries, the former general manager of the Call of Duty series, was named Blizzard Entertainment's new president, taking office on February 5.

Following the unionization success of Raven Software's Game Workers Alliance (GWA) union for quality assurance (QA) testers, the 20-member QA team of Blizzard Albany announced a unionization drive in July 2022 as GWA Albany. The vote passed (14–0).

On July 24, 2024, 500 artists, designers, engineers, producers, and quality assurance testers who work on World of Warcraft voted to unionize under the Communications Workers of America. The same day, 60 QA testers at Blizzard's Austin office, who work on various games including Diablo IV and Hearthstone, also voted to unionize and formed the union "Texas Blizzard QA United-CWA." The following year, in May 2025, the members of Blizzard Team 4, who work on the game Overwatch 2, also unionized with the Communications Workers of America, with nearly 200 game developers forming the wall-to-wall union "Overwatch Gamemakers Guild-CWA." In August 2025, Blizzard's Story and Franchise Development team announced it has unionized with the CWA. Later that month, 450 Diablo designers, engineers, artists, and support staff unionized across Irvine, California, Albany, New York, and Austin, Texas.

== Games ==
Blizzard Entertainment has developed 23 games since the inception of the company in 1991.

Release timeline
1994	The Death and Return of Superman
1994	Blackthorne
1994	Warcraft: Orcs & Humans
1995	Warcraft II: Tides of Darkness
1996
1997	Diablo
1997	The Lost Vikings 2
1998	StarCraft
1999
2000	Diablo II
2001
2002	Warcraft III: Reign of Chaos
2003
2004	World of Warcraft
2005
2006
2007
2008
2009
2010	StarCraft II: Wings of Liberty
2011
2012	Diablo III
2013
2014	Hearthstone
2015	Heroes of the Storm
2016	Overwatch
2017	StarCraft: Remastered
2018
2019	World of Warcraft Classic
2020	Warcraft III: Reforged
2021
2022	Diablo Immortal
2022	Overwatch 2
2023	Warcraft Rumble
2023	Diablo IV
2024
2025
2026	World of Warcraft: Forever
2027
2028
2029	Diablo V
TBA	Overwatch Rush

=== Main franchises ===
The majority of the games Blizzard published are in the Warcraft, Diablo, and StarCraft series. Since the release of Warcraft: Orcs & Humans (1994), Diablo (1997), and StarCraft (1998), the focus has been almost exclusively on those three franchises. Overwatch (2016) became an exception years later, bringing the number of main franchises to four. Each franchise is supported by other media based around its intellectual property such as novels, collectible card games, comics and video shorts. Blizzard announced in 2006 that it would be producing a Warcraft live-action film. The movie was directed by Duncan Jones, financed and produced by Legendary Pictures, Atlas Entertainment, and others, and distributed by Universal Pictures. It was released in June 2016. On October 4, 2022, Overwatch servers were officially shut off at the same time Overwatch 2's went up.

=== Spin-offs ===
Blizzard has released two spin-offs to the main franchises: Hearthstone (2014), which is set in the existing Warcraft lore, and Heroes of the Storm (2015), which features playable characters from all four of Blizzard's franchises.

=== Remasters ===
In 2015, Blizzard Entertainment formed "Classic Games division", a team focused on updating and remastering some of its older titles, with an initially announced focus on StarCraft: Remastered (2017), Warcraft III: Reforged (2020), and Diablo II: Resurrected (2021).

=== Re-released games ===
In February 2021, Blizzard Entertainment released a compilation called Blizzard Arcade Collection for Microsoft Windows, Xbox One, PlayStation 4, and Nintendo Switch. The collection includes five Blizzard's classic video games: The Lost Vikings, Rock n' Roll Racing, Blackthorne, The Lost Vikings 2 and RPM Racing, with the last two games added in April 2021. Some of the modern features include 16:9 resolution, 4-player split-screen, rewinding and saving of game progress, watching replays, and adding graphic filters to change the look of player's game. Additionally, it contains upgrades for each game such as enhanced local multiplayer for The Lost Vikings, new songs and artist performances for Rock n' Roll Racing, as well as a new level map for Blackthorne. A digital museum, which is included in the collection, features game art, unused content, and interviews.

=== Unreleased and future games ===
Notable unreleased titles include Warcraft Adventures: Lord of the Clans, an adventure game which was canceled on May 22, 1998; Shattered Nations, a turn-based strategy game cancelled around 1996; and StarCraft: Ghost, an action game aimed for release on consoles, co-developed with Nihilistic Software, which was "postponed indefinitely" on March 24, 2006, after being in development hell for much of its lifespan.

Work on a project called Nomad started around 1998 after the release of Starcraft, with development led by Duane Stinnett. Nomad was inspired by the tabletop role playing game Necromunda that was played in a post-apocalyptic setting. The project had vague goals, and around that time, many of the staff of Blizzard began playing MMORPGs EverQuest and Ultima Online. Nomad was cancelled in 1999 as Blizzard shifted to making its own MMORPG, World of Warcraft.

In the wake of the 2018 layoffs, two projects were cancelled: One was codenamed Orion, an asynchronous card game for mobile devices designed by Hearthstone developers. While the game was considered fun to play when players were engaged in real time, the asynchronous aspect diluted players' enjoyment of the game. The second, codenamed Ares, was a first-person shooter within the Starcraft universe inspired by Electronic Arts' Battlefield series that had been in development for three years.

After seven years of development, Blizzard revealed the cancellation of an unannounced MMO codenamed Titan on September 23, 2014, though Overwatch was created from its assets. The company also has a history of declining to set release dates, choosing to instead take as much time as needed, generally saying a given product is "done when it's done."

Pax Imperia II was originally announced as a title to be published by Blizzard. Blizzard eventually dropped Pax Imperia II, though, when it decided it might be in conflict with its other space strategy project, which became known as StarCraft. THQ eventually contracted with Heliotrope and released the game in 1997 as Pax Imperia: Eminent Domain.

The company announced in January 2022 that it was near release of another new intellectual property, named Odyssey according to Bloomberg News, a survival game that had been at work at the studio for nearly six years before its cancellation in 2024. Bloomberg stated that the game's origins came from World of Warcraft developer Craig Amai, and was originally prototyped using the Unreal Engine, which Blizzard licensed from Epic Games. When the game was revealed in 2022, about 100 employees were working on it, but around the same time, there was effort to switch from Unreal to Synapse, Blizzard's engine used for mobile games, though artists continued to develop assets in Unreal. Near when Microsoft completed its acquisition of Activision Blizzard, there was an internal belief that they would be able to bring on more developers to complete the transition to Synapse and have the game ready for a 2026 release, but with the culling of 1,900 staff from Microsoft Gaming in January 2024, the game's development was cancelled.

=== Ports ===
The company, known at the time as the Silicon & Synapse, initially concentrated on porting other studios' games to computer platforms, developing 8 ports between 1992 and 1993.

== Company structure ==
As with most studios with multiple franchises, Blizzard Entertainment has organized different departments to oversee these franchises. Formally, since around the time of World of Warcraft in 2004, these have been denoted through simply numerical designations. The original three teams were:

- Team 1 manages the StarCraft property. The team also oversaw the development of the StarCraft spin-off Heroes of the Storm. Team 1 also included the Classics Team to work on remastering Blizzard's earlier properties for modern computers, which have included StarCraft: Remastered, Warcraft III: Reforged and Diablo II: Resurrected. The Classic Games team was disbanded around August 2020, about eight months after Warcraft III: Reforged was released; according to Jason Schreier of Bloomberg News, this was due to Activision Blizzard driving Blizzard away from remastering its old properties, which figured into the launch issues with Warcraft III: Reforged.
- Team 2 continues to manage and create content for World of Warcraft.
- Team 3 oversees the Diablo franchise.

Since 2004, two new teams were created:

- Team 4 was created around 2007 to work on Blizzard's first new IP since World of Warcraft, that being Titan. Titan had development difficulties near 2013, and most of Team 4 was reallocated to the other teams, but the remaining members, led by Jeff Kaplan, revised Titan's concept into Overwatch, which remains in Team 4's hands since its release in 2016.
- Team 5 was created in 2008 to explore smaller games that could fit into Blizzard's portfolio. This resulted in the creation of Hearthstone, a collectible card game based on the Warcraft property, which became Team 5's priority.

Blizzard has used an informal motto, "it'll be ready when it's ready" to describe the release schedule for its games. The concept of accepting delays in software releases originally came about when the company opted to push back the release of Diablo to ensure a quality product at release. By the time of World of Warcraft, employees began using the phrase in response to eager fans looking for a release date.

== Technology ==
=== Battle.net 2.0 ===
Blizzard Entertainment released its revamped Battle.net service in 2009. The platform provides online gaming, digital distribution, digital rights management, and social networking service. Battle.net allows people who have purchased Blizzard products to download digital copies of games they have purchased, without needing any physical media.

On November 11, 2009, Blizzard required all World of Warcraft accounts to switch over to Battle.net accounts. This transition means that all current Blizzard titles can be accessed, downloaded, and played with a singular Battle.net login.

Battle.net 2.0 is the platform for matchmaking service for Blizzard games, which offers players a host of additional features. Players are able to track their friend's achievements, view match history, avatars, etc. Players are able to unlock a wide range of achievements for Blizzard games.

The service provides the user with community features such as friends lists and groups, and allows players to chat simultaneously with players from other Blizzard games using VoIP and instant messaging. For example, players no longer need to create multiple user names or accounts for most Blizzard products. To enable cross-game communication, players need to become either Battletag or Real ID friends.

=== Warden client ===
Blizzard Entertainment has made use of a special form of software known as the 'Warden Client'. The Warden client is known to be used with Blizzard's online games such as Diablo and World of Warcraft, and the Terms of Service contain a clause consenting to the Warden software's RAM scans while a Blizzard game is running.

The Warden client scans a small portion of the code segment of running processes in order to determine whether any third-party programs are running. The goal of this is to detect and address players who may be attempting to run unsigned code or third party programs in the game. This determination of third party programs is made by hashing the scanned strings and comparing the hashed value to a list of hashes assumed to correspond to banned third party programs. The Warden's reliability in correctly discerning legitimate versus illegitimate actions was called into question when a large-scale incident happened. This incident banned many Linux users after an update to Warden caused it to incorrectly detect Cedega as a cheat program. Blizzard issued a statement claiming it had correctly identified and restored all accounts and credited them with 20 days' play. Warden scans all processes running on a computer, not just the game, and could possibly run across what would be considered private information and other personally identifiable information. It is because of these peripheral scans that Warden has been accused of being spyware and has run afoul of controversy among privacy advocates.

== Controversies and legal disputes ==
=== Blizzard Entertainment, Inc. v. Valve Corporation ===
Shortly after Valve filed its trademark for "DotA" to secure the franchising rights for Dota 2, DotA-Allstars, LLC, run by former contributors to the game's predecessor, Defense of the Ancients, filed an opposing trademark in August 2010. DotA All-Stars, LLC was sold to Blizzard Entertainment in 2011. After the opposition was over-ruled in Valve's favor, Blizzard filed an opposition against Valve in November 2011, citing its license agreement with developers, as well as its ownership of DotA-Allstars, LLC.

An agreement was reached between Blizzard and Valve in May 2012 giving Valve undisputed commercial rights to the "DotA" trademark, notably for Dota 2, while retaining rights for Blizzard to use the name in a noncommercial manner for its community "with regard to player-created maps for Warcraft III and StarCraft II". As part of the agreement Blizzard also renamed a custom map it had originally developed for StarCraft II: Wings of Liberty from "Blizzard DOTA" to "Blizzard All-Stars" which would eventually become the stand-alone game, Heroes of the Storm.

=== California Department of Fair Employment and Housing v. Activision Blizzard ===
Following a two-year investigation, the California Department of Fair Employment and Housing (DFEH) filed a lawsuit against Activision Blizzard in July 2021 for gender-based discrimination and sexual harassment, principally within the Blizzard Entertainment workplace. The DFEH alleges that female employees were subjected to constant sexual harassment, unequal pay, retaliation, as well as discrimination based on pregnancy. The suit also described a "pervasive frat boy workplace culture" at Blizzard that included objectification of women's bodies and jokes about rape. Activision Blizzard's statement described the suit as meritless, contending that action had been taken in any instances of misconduct. The company also objected to the DFEH not approaching it prior to filing. The lawsuit prompted an employee walkout, as well as leading J Allen Brack, and head of human resources, Jesse Meschuk, to step down. Amidst the lawsuit, Morhaime, Brack's predecessor, posted a statement to Twitter writing that he was “ashamed.” Because of these allegations, Blizzard changed names that referenced employees in multiple of its franchises, including Overwatch and World of Warcraft.

=== FreeCraft ===
On June 20, 2003, Blizzard issued a cease and desist letter to the developers of an open-source clone of the Warcraft engine called FreeCraft, claiming trademark infringement. This hobby project had the same gameplay and characters as Warcraft II, but came with different graphics and music.

As well as a similar name, FreeCraft enabled players to use Warcraft II graphics, provided they had the Warcraft II CD. The programmers of the clone shut down their site without challenge. Soon after that the developers regrouped to continue the work by the name of Stratagus.

=== Hearthstone ban and Hong Kong protests ===
During an October 2019 Hearthstone Grandmasters streaming event in Taiwan, one player Ng Wai Chung, going by his online alias "Blitzchung" used an interview period to show support for the protestors in the 2019–20 Hong Kong protests. Shortly afterwards, on October 7, 2019, Blitzchung was disqualified from the current tournament and forfeited his winnings to date, and banned for a one-year period. The two shoutcasters engaged in the interview were also penalized with similar bans. Blizzard justified the ban as from its Grandmasters tournament rules that prevents players from anything that "brings [themselves] into public disrepute, offends a portion or group of the public, or otherwise damages [Blizzard's] image".

Blizzard's response led to several protests from current Hearthstone players, other video game players, and criticism from Blizzard's employees, fearing that Blizzard was giving into the censorship of the Chinese government. Protests were held, including through the 2019 BlizzCon in early November, to urge Blizzard to reverse its bans. The situation also drew the attention of several U.S. lawmakers, fearing that Blizzard, as a U.S. company, was letting China dictate how it handled speech and also urged the bans to be reversed.

Blizzard CEO J. Allen Brack wrote an open letter on October 11, 2019, apologizing for the way Blizzard handled the situation, and reduced the bans for both Blitzchung and the casters to six months. Brack reiterated that while it supports free speech and its decision was in no way tied to the Chinese government, it wants players and casters to avoid speaking beyond the tournament and the games in such interviews.

=== King's "Diversity Tool" controversy ===
On May 12, 2022, Blizzard Entertainment released a blog post about the Diversity Space Tool, developed by a team at King – a mobile business unit at Activision Blizzard – alongside the MIT Game Lab. Jacqueline Chomatas, King's globalization project manager, described the tool as a "measurement device" to analyze how diverse the characters are "when compared to the 'norm'". The post showed example images of the tool being used on Overwatch's cast, with graphs showing breakdowns of the character attributes, and stated that "The Overwatch 2 team at Blizzard has also had a chance to experiment with the tool, with equally enthusiastic first impressions." Blizzard shared the intent to release the tool during the summer and fall of 2022, with the goal of "making the tool available to the industry as a whole".

The tool received heavy backlash online. Many people asked why Blizzard would create the tool instead of hiring diverse teams, and raised questions regarding the tool's rating scale. The blog post originally suggested that the tool was used in an active development, mainly for Overwatch, which led some Blizzard employees working on the game to publicly deny the tool was used in Overwatch development and to criticize the tool further. On May 13, 2022, the blog post was edited to remove the example images of the tool and any mention of Overwatch. Later, the post was deleted altogether.

=== MDY Industries, LLC v. Blizzard Entertainment, Inc. ===
On July 14, 2008, the United States District Court for the District of Arizona ruled on the case MDY Industries, LLC v. Blizzard Entertainment, Inc.. The Court found that MDY was liable for copyright infringement since users of its Glider bot program were breaking the End User License Agreement and Terms of Use for World of Warcraft. MDY Industries appealed the judgment of the district court, and a judgment was delivered by the Ninth Circuit Court of Appeals on December 14, 2010, in which the summary judgment against MDY for contributory copyright infringement was reversed. Nevertheless, they ruled that the bot violated the DMCA and the case was sent back to the district court for review in light of this decision.

MDY v. Blizzard's decision did affirm a prior Ninth Circuit ruling in Vernor v. Autodesk, Inc. that software licenses, such as the one used by Blizzard for WoW, were enforceable and enshrined the principle that video games could be sold as licenses to players rather than purchased. This ruling, though limited to the states of the Ninth Circuit, has been used by the industry to continue to sell games as licenses to users.

=== Privacy controversy and Real ID ===
On July 6, 2010, Blizzard Entertainment announced that it was changing the way its forums worked to require that users identify themselves with their real name. The reaction from the community was overwhelmingly negative with multiple game magazines calling the change "foolhardy" and an "epic fail". It resulted in a significant user response on the Blizzard forums, including one thread on the issue reaching over 11,000 replies. This included personal details of a Blizzard employee who gave his real name "to show it wasn't a big deal". Shortly after revealing his real name, forum users posted personal information including his phone number, picture, age, home address, family members, and favorite TV shows and films.

Some technology media outlets suggested that displaying real names through Real ID is a good idea and would benefit both Battle.net and the Blizzard community. But others were worried that Blizzard was opening its fans up to real-life dangers such as stalking, harassment, and employment issues, since a simple Internet search by someone's employer can reveal their online activities.

Blizzard initially responded to some of the concerns by saying that the changes would not be retroactive to previous posts, that parents could set up the system so that minors cannot post, and that posting to the forums is optional. However, due to the significant negative response, Blizzard President Michael Morhaime issued a statement rescinding the plan to use real names on Blizzard's forums for the time being. The idea behind this plan was to allow players who had a relationship outside of the games to find each other more easily across all the Blizzard game titles.

=== StarCraft privacy and other lawsuits ===
In 1998, Donald P. Driscoll, an Albany, California attorney, filed a suit on behalf of Intervention, Inc., a California consumer group, against Blizzard Entertainment for "unlawful business practices" for the action of collecting data from a user's computer without their permission.

On May 19, 2014, Blizzard Entertainment filed a lawsuit in federal court in California, alleging that the unidentified programmers were involved in creation of software that hacks StarCraft II. Most of the alleged charges are related to copyright infringement.

Back in May 2010, MBCPlus Media, which operates the network MBCGame (Korean television stations that are broadcasting tournaments built around StarCraft), was sued by Blizzard for broadcasting StarCraft tournaments without the company's consent, insisting that StarCraft is not a public domain offering, as Blizzard has invested significant money and resources to create the StarCraft game.

=== World of Warcraft private server interactions ===
On December 5, 2008, Blizzard Entertainment issued a cease and desist letter to many administrators of high-population World of Warcraft private servers (essentially slightly altered hosting servers of the actual World of Warcraft game, that players do not have to pay for). Blizzard used the Digital Millennium Copyright Act to influence many private servers to fully shut down and cease to exist.

== Related companies ==
Over the years, some former Blizzard Entertainment employees have moved on and established gaming companies of their own. Several of these occurred following the merger between Activision Holdings and Blizzard's parent company at the time, Vivendi Games in 2008, and more recently as Activision Blizzard has directed Blizzard away from properties like Warcraft and StarCraft that are not seen as financial boons to the larger company. These employees left to form their smaller studios to give themselves the creative freedom that they were lacking at Blizzard. Collectively these studios are known as "Blizzard 2.0".

- ArenaNet, creators of the Guild Wars franchise.
- Bonfire Studios, founded by Rob Pardo.
- Carbine Studios, now defunct as of September 2018, after releasing a massively multiplayer title WildStar.
- Castaway Entertainment, now defunct, after working on a game similar to the Diablo series, Djinn.
- Dreamhaven, founded by Michael Morhaime.
- Fantastic Pixel Castle, founded by Greg Street, working on a new combat-focused MMO, codenamed "Ghost."
- Flagship Studios, now defunct, creators of Hellgate: London, also worked on Mythos.
- Frost Giant Studios, founded by Tim Morten and Tim Campbell, currently developing real-time strategy game Stormgate.
- Hyboreal Games, founded by Michio Okamura.
- Magic Soup Games, founded by J. Allen Brack and Jen Oneal.
- Ready at Dawn Studios, creators of The Order: 1886, Daxter, God of War: Chains of Olympus and an Ōkami port for the Wii.
- Red 5 Studios, now defunct, creators of Firefall, a free-to-play MMOG.
- Runic Games, now defunct, founded by Travis Baldree, Erich Schaefer, and Max Schaefer; creators of Torchlight.
- Second Dinner, founded by Ben Brode, creators of Marvel Snap.
- Uncapped Games, founded by David Kim and Jason Hughes.
