= Blizzard North =

American video game developer

- Formerly: Condor (1993–1996)
- Type: Subsidiary
- Industry: Video games
- Founded: 1993
- Founders: David Brevik; Erich Schaefer; Max Schaefer
- Defunct: 2005
- Headquarters: San Mateo, California, U.S.
- Products: Justice League Task Force, Diablo, Diablo II, Diablo II: Lord of Destruction
- Website: www.blizzard.com

Blizzard North (formerly known as Condor) was an American video game development studio based in San Mateo, California. The studio was the Bay Area division of Blizzard Entertainment, and it was known for the Diablo series. The company was originally based in Redwood City, California, always serving as the northern counterpart to Blizzard Entertainment's main development studio in Irvine, California. In 2005, Blizzard North was closed to reallocate its staff to the development of World of Warcraft.

== History ==
Blizzard North was founded in 1993 under the name Condor by David Brevik, Erich Schaefer, and Max Schaefer. The three met while working at FM Waves, a clip art production studio. Upon the closure of FM Waves, the trio scavenged its equipment to create Brevik's concept of a dungeon crawler game based on Dungeons & Dragons with roguelike gameplay. Brevik served as the president of the company between 1993 and 2003, while the Schaefer brothers held the Vice President positions.

The company was purchased and renamed as Blizzard North by Blizzard Entertainment's former owner Davidson & Associates about nine months before the release of their hit PC game Diablo in 1997. However, Blizzard North had complete autonomy from Blizzard Entertainment while David Brevik and the Schaefer brothers continued to manage the company respectively as the President and Vice Presidents. Diablo was highly successful, and its 2000 sequel Diablo II even more so. An expansion pack, Diablo II: Lord of Destruction, followed the year after.

Upon the 2001 completion of Diablo II and its expansion content, Blizzard North split its development staff between Diablo III and a Diablo-like game set in space, dubbed Starblo by the studio. In June 2003, Blizzard North executives Bill Roper, Max Schaefer, Erich Schaefer, and David Brevik emailed Blizzard Entertainment's then-parent company, Vivendi Games, threatening to resign unless provided financial protections and communication on Vivendi's intent to sell Blizzard. Vivendi accepted their resignations effective immediately, spurring them to found Flagship Studios and recruit similarly disgruntled Blizzard North employees.

In August 2005, Blizzard Entertainment closed Blizzard North, claiming that its headquarters in Irvine, California, was struggling to supervise this secondary studio's troubled development of Diablo III. Blizzard North employees were offered the chance to interview for positions in Southern California supporting the development of World of Warcraft: The Burning Crusade, the first expansion to the company's MMORPG, whose success had far outpaced the Diablo series in sales.

== Legacy ==
A few employees from the Diablo team, including Eric Sexton, Michio Okamura, and Steven Woo, launched a new company, Hyboreal Games.

=== Castaway Entertainment ===
Castaway Entertainment was established by former employees of Blizzard North, and was also based in Redwood City, California. The company signed a publishing agreement with Electronic Arts in March 2004, but had yet to produce any products for that publisher when it was shut down in 2008.

Former Blizzard North members who joined the studio include Michael Scandizzo, Stefan Scandizzo, Alan Ackerman, Steven Woo, Rick Seis, Ted Bisson, Bruno Bowden, Peter Brevik, Michael Huang, Kelly Johnson (artist), Michio Okamura, Tom Ricket (also known as Sluggy Freelance's Shirt Guy Tom), and Fredrick Vaught (after whom the Halls of Vaught in Diablo II were named).

Other notable employees include game designer Bill Dunn and art director Rick Macaraeg.

On April 4, 2008, Michael Scandizzo announced that Castaway was suspending operations due to financial problems.

=== Moon Beast Productions ===
Several key members of Condor / Blizzard North, founded Moon Beast Productions in 2021 as an independent game development studio. The team at Moon Beast Productions includes key Blizzard North founders and staff members, Erich Schaefer, Peter Hu (considered the primary architect of Diablo II LOD expansion) and Phil Shenk (Shenk the Overseer in Diablo II was named for Phil).

In December 2024 it was confirmed by several sources including VentureBeat that Moon Beast had secured $4.5 million in seed funding from a group including 1AM Gaming, The Mini Fund, Overwolf, Versus Ventures Gaingels, Cohh Carnage, and Mark Pincus. At the time of this writing July 2025 the project is in Pre-Alpha development and has not released title.

== Games ==
=== As Condor ===
- NFL Quarterback Club '95 (1994) – handheld versions
- Justice League Task Force (1995) – Mega Drive/Genesis version
- NFL Quarterback Club '96

=== As Blizzard North ===
- Diablo (1996) – action role-playing game
- Diablo II (2000) – action role-playing game
  - Diablo II: Lord of Destruction (2001) – expansion pack

=== As Castaway Entertainment ===
- Yaris (2007) – racing advergame

=== As Moon Beast Productions ===
- Darkhaven (2026) – action role-playing game

=== Cancelled ===
- Diablo Junior
- NFLPA Superstars (for the canceled Panasonic M2 console)
- Diablo III (in development 2000–2005)

== See also ==
- Runic Games
