= Justice League Task Force (video game) =

1995 video game

- North American Genesis box art by Sal Velluto
- Developers: Sunsoft of America; Condor (Genesis); Blizzard Entertainment (SNES)
- Publisher: Acclaim Entertainment
- Producer: Samwise Didier (SNES)
- Designer: Dan MacArthur
- Composers: Matt Uelmen (Genesis); Glenn Stafford (SNES)
- Platforms: Genesis, Super NES
- Release: Mega Drive/Genesis: NA: 1995; EU: June 1995; Super NES: NA: June 1995; EU: 1995
- Genre: Fighting
- Modes: Single-player, multiplayer

Justice League Task Force is a competitive fighting game for the Genesis and Super Nintendo Entertainment System in 1995. The Genesis version was developed by Condor (later known as Blizzard North) and the Super NES version was by Blizzard Entertainment.

It involves characters from DC Comics' Justice League, including Superman, Batman, Wonder Woman, Green Arrow, The Flash, and Aquaman. Additional Justice League members Martian Manhunter and Fire, as well as the supervillain Shrapnel, were also planned to appear but had to be omitted due to memory limitations.

== Story ==
Screen capture of a typical round of the game (SNES version).

Darkseid attacks the planet Earth, destroying a military base in the process. The player takes control of a member of the Justice League of their choosing, and tracks down the other members for information, only to be attacked by them. As the hero defeats the other Justice League members, they discover that they are android duplicates. Coming to this conclusion, the hero battles Cheetah and Despero for more information.

They both lead the hero to Darkseid, who then forces the hero to fight their duplicate. Upon defeating the clone, the hero must face Darkseid himself. After the hero defeats him, the other League members are freed, and the military base is restored.

== Reception ==
Reception

Review scores
Publication	Score
Famitsu	6/10, 6/10, 6/10, 5/10 (SNES); 6/10 4/10, 5/10, 4/10 (GEN)
Hyper	66%

Justice League Task Force received mostly negative reviews. The four reviewers of Electronic Gaming Monthly scored the Genesis version a 5.875 out of 10, criticizing the choppy animation, the limited number of moves, and most especially the poor controls, which they said made executing special moves "too much work to be any fun." GamePro gave negative reviews to both the Genesis and SNES versions, similarly citing poor controls, unimpressive special moves, and sprites which look good in still frame but ugly in animation.

Next Generation reviewed both ports of the game and gave them two out of five stars. For the Genesis, they stated, "Squint your eyes and you could swear you're playing any of the other many fighting games, that doesn't mean Justice League is awful, it's just real normal." For the SNES version: "comic book fans and fighting fans should get a kick out of it, but everyone else is likely to yawn."

== Action figures ==
In 2024, McFarlane Toys released 7" action figures of Superman, Batman, Aquaman, and The Flash based on the game as part of the DC Multiverse line. Each figure includes parts to collectively build a fifth figure, Darkseid.

== See also ==
- Mortal Kombat vs. DC Universe
- Injustice: Gods Among Us
- Injustice 2
