= Torchlight (disambiguation) =

Torchlight may refer to:

- Light given off by a torch
- Torchlight, a 2009 action role-playing game
- Torchlight II, a 2012 action role-playing game
- Torchlight III, a 2020 action role-playing game
- Torchlight (1985 film), a 1985 American film
- Torchlight (2018 film), a 2018 Indian film
- Torchlight, Kentucky, United States
- "Torchlight (song)" by Missy Higgins, 2017
