= Matt Uelmen =

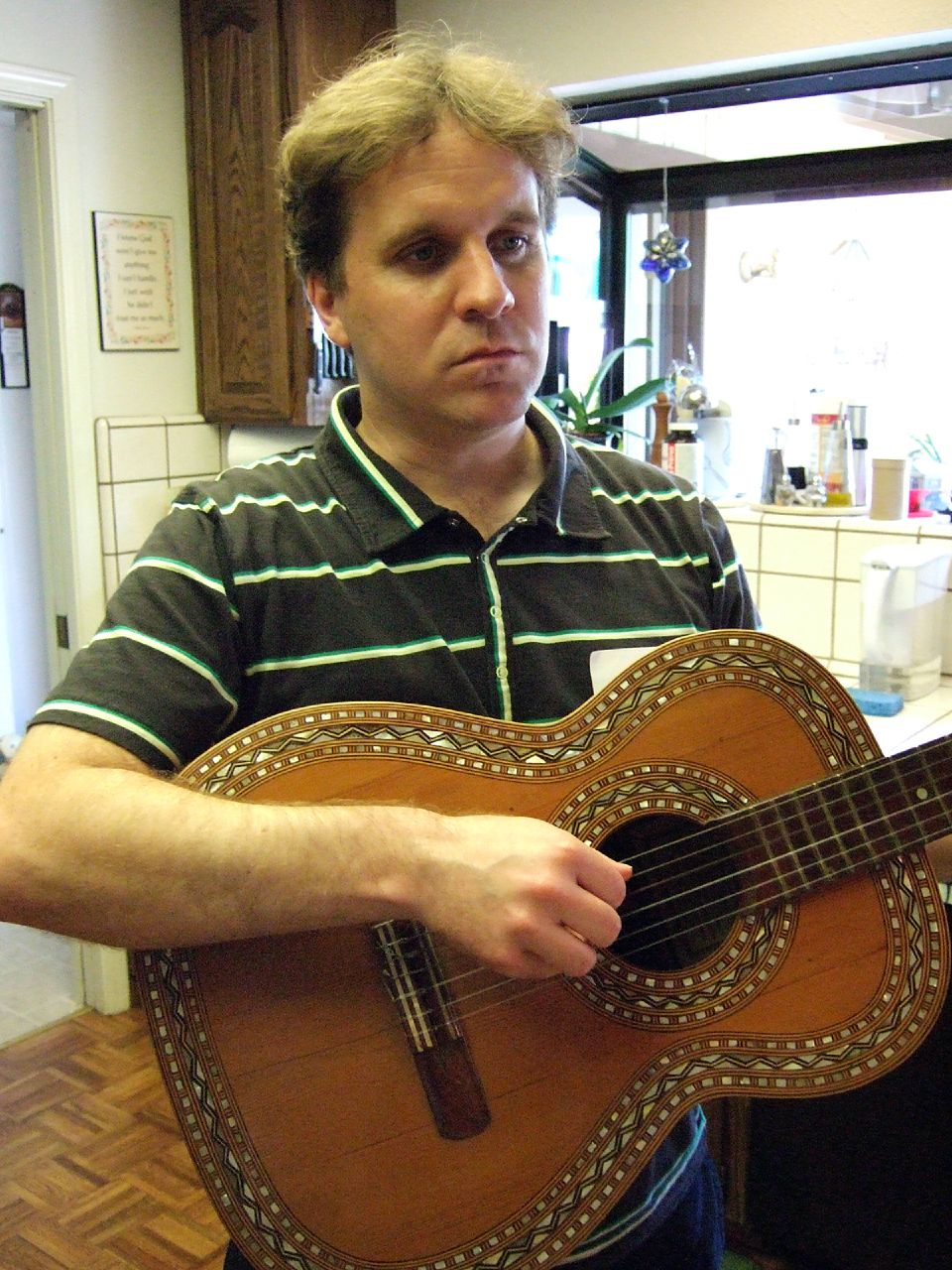
- Uelmen on guitar in 2006

Background information
- Born: Matthew Francis Uelmen; July 31, 1972 (age 54); South Bay, California
- Genres: Video game music
- Occupations: Composer, sound designer
- Instruments: Keyboard, guitar, flute and percussion
- Years active: 1994–present

Matt Uelmen (/ˈoʊlmɪn/; born July 31, 1972) is an American video game music composer and sound designer. He is best known for his work in Blizzard Entertainment's Diablo series, which was recognized with the inaugural Excellence in Audio award by the IGDA in 2001. He also worked as a sound designer for the real-time strategy game StarCraft, and worked on World of Warcraft's expansion The Burning Crusade in 2007. Uelman worked as a composer and sound designer for Runic Games from 2009 until its closure in 2017, most notably on the Torchlight series.

== Biography ==
=== Early life and work ===
Growing up in the South Bay area of Greater Los Angeles, Uelmen began taking piano lessons at age six from his tutor, Lenee Bilski, who provided him with a strong theoretical foundation. At 13 years old, he moved with his family to San Jose, California, where he completed high school. During this time, Uelmen was self-taught, mostly influenced by jazz, classic rock, and classical music, especially Liszt and Debussy while he was in high school, and Miles Davis, Jimi Hendrix and Tom Waits later on. He later diversified his instruments to include the flute, guitar, keyboard and percussion.

He studied at Georgetown University from 1989 to 1993, where he earned the Mary Catherine Mita Prize for his thesis Cannibal Culture, Technology and American music in 1993. During college, he was also a keyboardist in a six-member bar band, where he acquired practical experience and learned about "arrangement, interaction and economy". He began working in video game music in 1994, when he was hired by Condor. His first notable work in this period was on the game Justice League Task Force for Sunsoft, released in 1995 for the Sega Genesis.

=== Blizzard Entertainment (1996-2008) ===
In March 1996, Blizzard Entertainment acquired Condor, which was renamed into Blizzard North. On December 31, 1996, Blizzard released their first game of the company's successful series, Diablo. His work in Diablo was so well received that Uelmen was loaned to Blizzard's StarCraft team (but stayed in Redwood City), where he did sound design; that game was released two years after Diablo, in 1998.

On June 29, 2000, Blizzard launched the second game of the Diablo series, Diablo II. In 2001, Uelmen, who composed the Diablo II Soundtrack, and cinematic soundtrack composers Jason Hayes, Glenn Stafford and Andrea Pessino won the International Game Developers Association award for Excellence in Audio for their work on Diablo II. Continuing his work in the Diablo series, on June 29, 2001, Blizzard launched what would be believed to be the last game of the series, the expansion pack Diablo II: Lord of Destruction. In an interview with Gamasutra, Uelmen was asked about his time at Blizzard between 2001 and 2005. When asked whether he had worked on the earlier version of Diablo III prior to the shutdown of Blizzard North, he responded, "I guess at this point I can say, yes, more or less. Blizzard has always had a number of projects, though, that may or may not see the light of day. Some of those have been talked about, but there definitely was more than one thing going on development-wise at the time."

From 2005 to 2007, Uelmen created some of the sound and music for Blizzard's popular MMORPG, World of Warcraft's expansion pack, World of Warcraft: The Burning Crusade; his work represents the majority of the music in the new area of the game, Outland. He is one of about ten composers who have contributed to World of Warcraft. After his departure from Blizzard, his work was used as the basis for some of the tracks in the Blizzard Entertainment and Eminence Symphony Orchestra collaboration, Echoes of War (2008).

=== Runic Games and Echtra Games (2009-2025) ===
In 2009, Uelmen joined the newly formed Runic Games, which includes several former Blizzard North and Flagship Studios employees. He composed the score for their 2009 game, Torchlight and served as sound designer. He continued to work at Runic on Torchlight II, which released in September 2012. Runic Games closed down in November 2017, shortly after releasing Hob.

In 2016, Uelmen followed his former long-time colleague Max Schaefer as he started the new game company Echtra Games. In 2020, he worked on the soundtrack to Torchlight III. In March 2021, the studio was acquired by Zynga to develop a game with NaturalMotion. In June 2025, the studio was closed by Zynga.

== Works ==
All works listed below were composed by Uelmen unless otherwise noted

Year	Title	Notes
1995	Justice League Task Force	also sound design
1996	Diablo	
1997	Diablo: Hellfire	
1998	StarCraft	sound design
2000	Diablo II	
2001	Diablo II: Lord of Destruction	
2007	World of Warcraft: The Burning Crusade	With Russell Brower and Derek Duke
2009	Torchlight	
2012	Diablo III	Guitars / Dulcimer
2012	Torchlight II	
2014	Diablo III: Reaper of Souls	Monster Voice Effects
2017	Hob	
2020	Torchlight III	
2024	Diablo IV: Vessel of Hatred	Composed "Kurast" with Ted Reedy
