= Diablo II Soundtrack =

Music from the video game Diablo II

Soundtrack album by Matt Uelmen
- Released: June 30, 2000
- Recorded: Redwood City, Oakland, and San Mateo, California, April 1997 - March 2000
- Genre: Video game soundtrack
- Length: 61:08
- Label: Blizzard Entertainment
- Producer: Matt Uelmen

Diablo II Soundtrack is the soundtrack of video game music from Diablo II (PC). It features music composed by Matt Uelmen for the game. It was released on June 30, 2000 as part of the Diablo II Collector's Edition, and later on iTunes.

== Recording ==
The score was composed by Matt Uelmen and integrates creepy ambience with melodic pieces. The style of the score is ambient industrial and experimental.

Some tracks were created by reusing the tracks from Diablo, while others by rearranging tracks that were out-takes. Other scores are combinations of parts that were created more than a year after the first game's release. A single track usually integrates recorded samples from sound libraries, live recorded instrument interpretation samples specially meant for the game (guitar, flute, oriental percussion), and electronic instruments also, making the tracks difficult for later live interpretations.

While the player visits the town, the game recreates the peaceful atmosphere from the first Diablo game, so for that the theme from Act I called "Rogue" comes back with the same chords of the original piece, reproducing only a part of the original Diablo town theme. For Act II Mustafa Waiz, a percussionist, and Scott Petersen, the game's sound designer, worked on the drum samples. Waiz played on the dumbek, djembe, and finger cymbals which gave Matt Uelmen a base upon which to build tracks around.

The town theme from Act II, "Toru", makes strong statement of departure from the world of Act I while also maintaining a thematic connection to what had come before. It is the first time in the series to be used some radically different elements than the guitars and choral sounds that dominate both the original Diablo and the opening quarter of Diablo II. The foundation of the "Toru" piece is found in exciting dynamics of a Chinese wind gong. The instrument radically changes color from a steady mysterious drone to a harsh, fearsome noise, that gives exotic feeling and at the same time the pacing of the second town.

In all sequences of Act II with deserts and valleys, Arabic percussion sounds dominate. The composer was impressed by two of the Spectrasonics music libraries, Symphony of Voices and Heart of Asia. He used samples from Heart of Asia in the Harem piece from Act II. The "Crypt" track uses a sample from Symphony of Voices; the choral phrase Miserere.

The piece "Coda" samples from Frédéric Chopin's Prelude in C Minor, opus 28, no. 20.

== Reception ==
In 2001, Uelmen, who composed the soundtrack, and cinematic soundtrack composers Jason Hayes, Glenn Stafford and Andrea Pessino won the International Game Developers Association award for Excellence in Audio for their work on Diablo II.

== Different versions ==
The original soundtrack, which can be extracted from the game files, comprises over twenty songs totaling more than two hours in length. Because of space constraints, some songs on the CD release were edited to reduce their length, while others were left out entirely. For example, "Rogue" is a reduced-length version of the Rogue Encampment theme, and the Tristram theme was not included.

A full-length collection of music from Diablo II and Diablo II: Lord of Destruction was posted to the official fansite, but has since been removed.

== Track listing ==
1. "Wilderness" - 7:58
2. "Rogue" - 2:58
3. "Sisters" - 1:45
4. "Spider" - 5:19
5. "Jungle" - 2:24
6. "Zakarum" - 2:56
7. "Desert" - 3:38
8. "Toru" - 2:57
9. "Sanctuary" - 4:08
10. "Crypt" - 3:31
11. "Tombs" - 5:17
12. "Monastery" - 5:56
13. "Cave" - 3:50
14. "Mesa" - 3:26
15. "Leoric" - 3:06
16. "Coda" - 0:56
17. "Roger and Me" - 1:03

== Personnel ==
- Mustafa Waiz (djembe and dumbek)
- Scott Petersen (drums)
- Roger Weismeyer (oboe)
- Bernie Wilkens (pedal steel guitar).
- Heart of Asia, Heart of Africa and Symphony of Voices samples by Spectrasonics.
- Recorded by Scott Petersen and Matt Uelmen.
- Produced, composed, and performed by Matt Uelmen.
