= Arc Games =

American video game publisher

Arc Games Inc.
- Formerly: Perfect World Entertainment (2008–2022); Gearbox Publishing San Francisco (2022–2024)
- Type: Private
- Industry: Video games
- Founded: 2008; 18 years ago
- Headquarters: Los Gatos, California, US
- Key people: Yoon Im (CEO); Jason Park (COO); Zheng Zeng (CTO); Joon Kim (Chief of Staff); Jooyoung Chung (VP, Live Operations); Michael Borras (VP, Business)
- Parent: Perfect World (2008–2022); Gearbox Publishing (2022–2024); Embracer Group (2024–2025); Project Golden Arc (2025–present)
- Subsidiaries: Cryptic Studios
- Website: arcgames.com

Arc Games Inc. (formerly known as Perfect World Entertainment and Gearbox Publishing San Francisco) is an American video game publisher. Founded in 2008 as the North American branch of the Chinese company Perfect World, they currently operate their former parent company's titles outside China as well as publishing various video games.

Originally formed to localize Perfect World's games for international audiences, Perfect World Entertainment published games from sister-company developers Cryptic Studios (Star Trek Online, Champions Online, Dungeons & Dragons Neverwinter) and Runic Games (Torchlight series and Hob), which they had acquired in 2011.

== History ==
In December 2021, Perfect World Entertainment was acquired by Embracer Group and merged into The Gearbox Entertainment Company and rebranded as Gearbox Publishing San Francisco.

Embracer announced their plans to sell The Gearbox Entertainment Company to Take-Two Interactive in March 2024, with Gearbox Publishing San Francisco being retained by Embracer. They subsequently rebranded as Arc Games in April of that year. Arc was originally the name of its game launcher program launched in 2013.

On November 26, 2025, Embracer announced that Arc Games and Cryptic Studios had been divested through a management buyout, under a company named Project Golden Arc. In December 2025, XD Entertainment acquired the Torchlight IP assets for US$37.18 million from Arc Games.

== Published games ==
=== Developed by Perfect World ===
- Legend of Martial Arts
- Perfect World International - September 2008
- Ether Saga Online - March 2009
- Jade Dynasty - June 2009
- Battle of the Immortals - May 2010
- Heroes of Three Kingdoms - July 2010
- Forsaken World - March 2011
- War of the Immortals - December 2011
- Fortuna - July 2013
- Elemental Kingdoms - 2013
- Swordsman Online - July 2014
- Arena of Heroes

=== Other games ===
Year	Name	Platforms	Developer	Notes
2009	Torchlight	Windows, OS X, Linux, Xbox 360	Runic Games	Published by Microsoft Studios on Xbox 360
2009	Champions Online	Windows	Cryptic Studios	Originally published by Atari
2010	Star Trek Online	Windows, OS X, PlayStation 4, Xbox One	Cryptic Studios	Originally published by Atari
2011	Rusty Hearts	Windows	Stairway Games	Discontinued
2012	Torchlight II	Windows, OS X, Linux, PlayStation 4, Xbox One, Nintendo Switch	Runic Games	
2012	Blacklight: Retribution	Windows, PlayStation 4	Zombie Studios	Windows version is discontinued
2013	Neverwinter	Windows, OS X, Linux, PlayStation 4, Xbox One, Nintendo Switch	Cryptic Studios	
2015	Gigantic	Windows, Xbox One	Motiga	Discontinued
2016	Livelock	Windows	Tuque Games	
2017	Hob	Windows, PlayStation 4, Nintendo Switch	Runic Games	
2019	Remnant: From the Ashes	Windows, PlayStation 4, Xbox One, Nintendo Switch	Gunfire Games	
2020	Torchlight III	Windows, PlayStation 4, Xbox One, Nintendo Switch	Echtra Games	
2023	Have a Nice Death	Windows, Nintendo Switch, PlayStation 4, PlayStation 5, Xbox One, Xbox Series X/S	Magic Design Studios	
2023	Remnant 2	Windows, PlayStation 5, Xbox Series X/S	Gunfire Games	
2023	UFO: Unidentified Falling Objects	Windows, Nintendo Switch	Andrew Morrish	
2024	Gigantic: Rampage Edition	Windows, PlayStation 4, PlayStation 5, Xbox One, Xbox Series X/S	Abstraction Games	
2025	Fellowship	Windows	Chief Rebel	
2025	Hyper Light Breaker	Windows	Heart Machine	
2025	Chip 'N Clawz vs. The Brainioids	Windows, Playstation 5, Xbox Series X/S	Snapshot Games	
2025	Frosthaven	Windows	Snapshot Games	
2026	Order of the Sinking Star	Windows, Playstation 5, Nintendo Switch 2	Thekla, Inc.	
