= Swordsman Online =

2014 video game

Swordsman
- Developer: Beijing Perfect World
- Publisher: NA: Perfect World Entertainment
- Platform: Windows
- Release: 3 July 2014
- Genre: MMORPG
- Mode: MMO

Swordsman was a free-to-play massively multiplayer online role-playing game (MMORPG) by Perfect World Entertainment. Closed Beta began on 16 June 2014, and was open to all users with a Closed Beta key. On 27 June 2014, the closed beta ended and the open beta began on 1 July 2014 for players with early access benefits and 3 July 2014, for all players. The game shut down on 5 June 2018.

== Story ==
Swordsman is based upon the novel The Smiling, Proud Wanderer by Louis Cha, the best-selling Chinese writer alive at the time. He is famed for his wuxia novels, with over 100 million copies of his works sold worldwide. As part of the wuxia genre of Chinese martial arts and chivalry, in Swordsman, the player takes the role of a wandering hero and experiences the hero's rise to glory amongst one of ten schools of martial arts, the quest to avenge the hero's destroyed village, and the opportunity to adventure with great heroes around the world.

== Gameplay ==
Swordsman gameplay has a focus on action-oriented combat that is less focused on stats and more on player skill. Players can excel through character mobility, aerial combat, twitch reflexes, dodging, and dynamic combat styles inspired by martial arts.

Zones dynamically transform as a result of player actions and the actions of player guilds. As players move through the main story, the environment may change based on their decisions. Towns will be destroyed or saved, new NPCs and quest givers will appear, and secret rooms will be revealed. Players can see the effects of their decisions reflected in the balance between good and evil in each zone.

== Martial Arts Schools ==
Players are able to choose from one of 11 different schools of combat including Shaolin, Wu-tang, Five Venoms, Splendor, Infinity, Sun and Moon Cult, Zephyr, House Tong, Harmony, E'mei, Falconer and the newly released class Grace.

Each school representing a different class also consists of different skill sets and usage in different weapons which expands on personal preferences and uniqueness for any player.
