= The Blue News =

American Indie rock duo

- Origin: Nashville, Tennessee, US
- Genres: Indie rock, blues rock, alternative rock, post-grunge, Americana, southern rock, pop
- Years active: 2006–present
- Labels: Blame Records USA, Musik and Film Records
- Members: Brent Orndorff, Dustin Richardson
- Website: www.bluenewsnation.com

The Blue News (also known as "Blue News", "The Blue News Project") is an American Indie rock duo originally formed in 2006 in Terre Haute, Indiana. The songwriting duo includes singer-songwriter and guitarist Brent Orndorff and drummer Dustin Richardson who joined the band in 2008. The duo currently focuses on recording, record producing, publishing, and licensing. New music is recorded in Orndorff's home recording studio in Indiana as well as various studios in Nashville, Tennessee. Dustin is also an audio engineer, mixing engineer, and music producer at House of Blues Studios, Nashville. The Blue News have become well known for several music licensing placements, touring (1992–2012), and college radio and AAA radio campaigns. The band's original music style includes soulful male vocals, electric guitar, acoustic guitar and creative songwriting featuring drums, and an eclectic blend of several musical styles including blues rock, American blues music, pop music, alternative rock, post-grunge, gospel, rock and roll, reggae, and classic rock.

The Blue News' music has grown in popularity due to several factors: consistent social marketing, 20 years of touring in the US, charting on radio for college, AAA, and blues radio markets, and several song placements in television series, interactive art installations, web videos, popular video games, film trailers and feature films. The Blue News has also gained 'high-profile' celebrity fans including Sublime with Rome, Sheryl Crow, Isaac Hayes, acclaimed producer Sylvia Massy and Stephen Wrench, former RCA Records executive and original music manager. The band's most recent release is a remastered greatest hits album released digitally in September 2017. The album includes 17 of the most popular songs from the band's previous albums.

== History ==
=== Formation and early years (2006) ===
The Blue News formed in 2006. Its name is a spoonerism of the phrase 'The New Blues'. Brent Orndorff founded the band after signing a recording contract for a record release deal with Statue Records Hollywood of Hollywood, California. He accomplished this by opening a studio in downtown Terre Haute called "Blame Records" where he recorded other artists to help pay for manufacturing and promoting his first solo album. The band's signature sound began with a few songs recorded that combined live instruments and vocals with samples and drum loops programmed with the ReBirth RB-338 software. Orndorff self-produced the band's debut LP, titled Blue News recording in a bedroom using a PC and the band began to tour, averaging two to three shows per week in several cities around the Midwest United States. After gaining momentum in the Midwest live music scene, the band was interviewed by both Chicago Music Guide and Louisville Music Guide, and made in-studio live radio broadcasts as more people began to take notice.

=== The Signs (2007) ===
In 2007, the recording contract with Statue Records was dissolved before the release of The Signs EP. The album was self-released as The Blue News Project to reflect that the songs were the result of a collaboration with multiple musicians. During this period, however, the band primarily performed live as a duo, featuring drummer Kraig Kerins. Songs from The Signs EP were used in the band's first college campus radio campaign with Vigilant Promotions of Minneapolis, Minnesota. The band's music aired on 75 stations across multiple states.

The songs "Love's So Strong" and "Next Time" were both featured in the PBS documentary series Roadtrip Nation. At the time the songs aired, the band was regularly playing shows at live music clubs in several US cities. In between gigs, the band started recording their third LP, Strange Light. The LP was self-produced and released by the band's Blame Records indie label after signing a distribution agreement with INgrooves Digital Distribution in San Francisco, California (now part of Universal Music Group).

=== Strange Light (2008–2009) ===
By 2008, The Blue News was touring consistently while further developing their original style and recorded their third album Strange Light. The album was self-released by Blame Records and found good reviews in the blues and rock communities. The LP was the first to include drummer Dustin Richardson who joined the band in early 2008. The band produced their first HD music video featuring the song "Shelter". The HD music video was shot and directed by Chris Thornberry of "Green Sky Media" and "The Price of Admission" and aired regularly on Indy's Music Channel (IMC), an independent 24-hour music television channel on cable station WDNI-CD. Although there was no official radio campaign for the album, songs from Strange Light received radio airplay in many US areas and the music continues to be regularly licensed in various media. Multiple songs from "Strange Light" were placed in 2009 on the UCF TV cable channel at the University of Central Florida in Orlando, Florida and that same year the station's programming received a 2009 Suncoast Emmy Award.

=== Good at Falling (2010) ===
Partially recorded at Stable Studios near Spencer, Indiana and finished in the band's private studio, the EP "Good at Falling" has an indie rock sound that was a departure from the band's early blues-influenced. In May 2010, the songs "So Easy" and "You've Got Someone" were released for the popular music video game Rock Band 2 on Xbox 360. Also in 2010, the band was invited to perform for a live 'one-take' style video series called "Folked Up!". This resulted in two new HD music videos featuring stripped-down acoustic versions of the songs "Be Yourself (And You'll Go Far)" and "Wasted Days". As of November 2012 the video for "Wasted Days" has over 35,000 views on the VISO Music Channel.

=== Wartime Songs (2011–2012) ===
In February 2011, Orndorff and Richardson recorded the fifth studio album by The Blue News, an EP titled Wartime Songs at Retrophonics Recording Studios in St. Augustine, Florida. Retrophonics is the private studio of producer Jim Devito who has recorded several famous bands including Tom Petty and the Heartbreakers, Lynyrd Skynyrd, Don Henley, Creed and JJ Grey & Mofro. The band recorded to analog reel-to-reel tape and tracked all six songs during one session. The album features several vintage instruments and amplifiers from the 1950s–1970s. In addition, the album was mixed with producer Sylvia Massy at RadioStar Studios in Weed, California.

The album was originally released on the band's Blame Records label on July 4, 2011. The album received good reviews and two songs ("Hitman Blues" and "Just A Game") were placed in the video game Rock Band 3 for both Xbox 360 and the PlayStation Network. Another song from the album, Two Lovers, was selected by Sublime with Rome to be included on Guitar Center's Fresh Cuts Volume 7 and 50,000 CD copies were given away in stores nationwide. In October 2011, the band was awarded 2nd place for the Blues Foundation's 'Best Self-Produced Blues CD' for the state of Indiana. The Blue News charted on both CMJ Alternative Rock and Blues radio charts during a successful radio campaign with Tinderbox Music.

In 2012, The Blue News signed a label partnership with Musik and Film Records in for limited digital distribution and the band's entire discography was re-released through The Orchard, a New York City-based digital distribution and entertainment services company. Among notable artists, The Orchard distributes many notable recording artists including the music of Butch Walker and Sharon Jones & The Dap-Kings.

=== Greatest Hits (2017) ===
In September 2017, The Blue News released their sixth album Greatest Hits, which includes remastered songs from previous albums that have been the most popular among fans.

== In popular culture ==
The songs of The Blue News have been featured on television series, film trailers, video games, and film several times since the first placement in 2007. Some notable song placements include:

- Angelfish (2019 film), Amazon Video ("Shelter")
- Bloodline, Netflix television series ("Next Time")
- Demolition, 2016 film trailer television spot ("Just a Game")
- Rebel Galaxy, video game ("Old River", "Same Old Story" and "Stay Gone For Good")
- 30 for 30 (Episode: "You Don’t Know Bo") on ESPN ("Love’s So Strong")
- Aussie Pickers, Australian television series
- Best Bars in America (Episode: "Dive Bars"), on Bravo ("Run and Hide")
- Force of Execution, film ("Come Back Home")
- Heartland (Episode: "Lost Song"), on Up Entertainment ("Break of Day" and "Rattlesnake Blues")
- Necessary Roughness (Episode: "Habit Forming") on USA Network ("Run and Hide")
- Necessary Roughness (Episode: "Fall Guy") ("Same Old Story")
- Roadtrip Nation (Episode #4.1) on PBS Television ("Next Time" and "Love’s So Strong")
- Rock Band 2, video game ("You’ve Got Someone")
- Rock Band 3, video game("Hitman Blues" and "Just a Game")
- Rock Band Blitz, video game ("Hitman Blues" and "Just a Game")
- Swamp Monsters (Episode: "Honey Island Swamp Monster") on Destination America
- Tap Tap Revenge 3, mobile app game ("Leavin" and "Next Time")
- Tap Tap Revenge Tour, mobile app game ("Just a Game" and "Hypnotized")
- Turn and Burn (Episode: "Crown Jewel") on Discovery Channel and Velocity
- Turn and Burn (Episode: "Drag On") on Discovery Channel and Velocity
- Turn and Burn (Episode: "Memory Lane") Discovery Channel and Velocity
- Turn and Burn (Episode: "Junk to Funk") Discovery Channel and Velocity
- UFC Ultimate Insider (Episode 224) on Fuel TV and Fox Sports
- Welcome to Myrtle Manor (Episode: "Let the Trailer Park Games Begin")
- Air Conflicts Vietnam

== Discography ==
- Blue News (2006)
- The Signs (2007)
- Strange Light (2008)
- Good at Falling (2010)
- Wartime Songs (2011)
- Greatest Hits (2017)
