= Torchlight II =

2012 video game

- Cover art with the game's four classes (clockwise from top: Embermage, Berserker, Outlander, and Engineer)
- Developer: Runic Games (Note: Ported to Nintendo Switch, PlayStation 4, and Xbox One by Panic Button)
- Publisher: Runic Games (Note: Published for Nintendo Switch, PlayStation 4, and Xbox One by Perfect World Entertainment)
- Designer: Travis Baldree
- Composer: Matt Uelmen
- Series: Torchlight
- Engine: OGRE
- Platforms: Windows; OS X; Linux; Nintendo Switch; PlayStation 4; Xbox One
- Release: September 20, 2012: Windows; September 20, 2012; OS X; February 2, 2015; Linux; March 4, 2015; Nintendo Switch, PlayStation 4, Xbox One; September 3, 2019
- Genres: Action role-playing, hack and slash
- Modes: Single-player, multiplayer

Torchlight II is an action role-playing dungeon crawler video game developed by Runic Games, released for Microsoft Windows on September 20, 2012. It is the sequel to Torchlight, and features peer-to-peer multiplayer support and extended modding capabilities. The game was released for OS X on February 2, 2015, and for Linux on March 4, 2015. Ports for Nintendo Switch, PlayStation 4, and Xbox One were released September 3, 2019 and were developed by Panic Button.

Torchlight II takes place in a fantasy world where the player character can be any of four classes, each with different skills and abilities. The plot starts with the destruction of the town of Torchlight, at the hands of the Alchemist from the first game, and has the character following the trail of destruction left in the Alchemist's wake as he searches for a cure to his illness which has driven him insane. The sequel to the first game was originally going to be an MMORPG however Torchlight II was released with both single-player and multi-player support, as the company felt they could release this much faster than the planned MMO. The game received mostly positive reviews from critics. A sequel, Torchlight III, was released in 2020.

== Gameplay ==
Like the original Torchlight, Torchlight II features randomly generated dungeons for the player to explore, and numerous types of monsters to fight for experience and loot. Torchlight II maintains the same basic gameplay as its predecessor, but features overland areas with multiple hub towns, and a longer campaign. Other new features include time of day cycles, weather effects, and a redesigned user interface. Also unlike the first game, some weapons and armor can only be used by certain classes, as opposed to all of them. With the ability to pursue different unique builds and customize the almost unlimited number of spells, gear, and weapons it leads to intricate fights. The exploration is wide and vast with large quantities of different landscapes. You can make combinations of gear that support your class abilities or choose to try to make tricky strategies to outplay your enemies. Players are able to customize character appearance with choice of sex, face, hair style and hair color. Additionally, several elements from the first game return, such as pets (but now with expanded options and basic customization available) and fishing. A retirement system was originally planned, similar or identical to the one in the first game, but was replaced with the current New Game Plus mode.

The game features four playable character classes. Each class has 3 skill trees to choose from which enable customization within each class. The three classes from the original Torchlight do not return as playable characters, and are instead presented in the game world as NPCs.

=== Multiplayer ===
Though the original Torchlight received positive reviews, the game's lack of any multiplayer modes was a near-universal criticism of the title by critics and fans alike. In the trailer for Torchlight II, Runic Games announced that they "heard their [the fans'] ideas" and criticism concerning the fact that the first Torchlight was a lonely experience without co-op. In addition to single-player mode, an all-new cooperative multiplayer mode has been added, supporting both internet and LAN play. Each multiplayer game can host up to 6 players, and loot drops separately for each player. Optional PVP (player versus player) has been confirmed by Runic. Torchlight II requires a Runic Games account to play in online multiplayer games.

== Plot ==
Years after the end of the original Torchlight, The Alchemist (one of the three playable characters in the first game) becomes corrupted by the Ember Blight coming from the Heart of Ordrak, the evil being who had been the source of the corruption under the town of Torchlight, and then destroys the town. The player character takes on a quest to stop this villain, who is using Ordrak's power to disturb the balance between the world's six elements.

As the game progresses, the player treks across large geographical areas, corresponding to three "acts" of the story and an epilogue. Act I, Wake of the Alchemist, is set in the mountainous Estherian Steppes, and Act II takes the player to a desert known as the Mana Wastes, and Act III takes place in Grunnheim, a haunted forest that contains the ruins of an ancient dwarven civilization. An Imperial Camp serves as the player's town.

== Development ==
Prior to the release of the first game, Runic Games had announced plans to develop a MMORPG set in the Torchlight game world to follow the release of the single player game. However, in August 2010, Runic announced they were developing Torchlight II, a sequel which was conceived not only as a way to give the series multiplayer support, but also to give Runic "more experience with making a multiplayer Torchlight." Some of the work on Torchlight II is intended to carry over to Runic Games' upcoming Torchlight MMORPG, which the company plans to focus on following the release of the sequel. Runic Games originally estimated the PC version's release date to be sometime in 2011, but in November 2011 company president Travis Baldree announced the game release date would be pushed back to 2012 to allow time for further polishing and beta testing.

In late 2010, Runic Games' increased involvement in the Xbox Live Arcade port of the first Torchlight game caused a delay in the development of the sequel, but memory and loading time optimizations developed for the port led to improvements in the PC version of Torchlight II.

Unlike its predecessor, Torchlight II features cinematic sequences, which are produced by Klei Entertainment, the developer of Don't Starve, Eets and Shank.

=== Closed beta ===
In May 2012, Runic Games announced that they would run a closed beta stress test from May 18 until May 24. A limited number of beta keys were given out to users who had created their Runic Games account prior to the beta start date.

=== GUTS editor ===
In April 2013, a patch to Torchlight II was released to add in the GUTS editor that allows users to alter the game's content and create user modifications. Along with this included new support for Steam Workshop, adding a Steam client-based automated mod distribution system to the game.

== Release ==
In April 2012, Torchlight II became available for pre-purchase through Steam, those who pre-purchased received the original Torchlight free. On August 30, 2012, company president Travis Baldree announced on the official forums for Runic Games that the game was to be released on September 20, 2012.

Perfect World announced that Torchlight II would be coming to Nintendo Switch, PlayStation 4, and Xbox One consoles in 2019, with Panic Button handling the ports. These console versions are planned for release on September 3, 2019.

== Sequel ==
Following the release of Torchlight II, Travis Baldree and Erich Schaefer left Runic Games to start their own studio. As a result the company was forced to cancel the game they were working on and lay off several staff, and in the aftermath, they changed their focus to Hob. In 2016, Max Schaefer departed as well, to found Echtra Games. In 2017, shortly after the release of Hob, Runic Games was closed down by their parent company. In 2018, Max Schaefer announced Echtra Games, which included several former Runic and Blizzard North developers, was working on Torchlight Frontiers, the planned free-to-play Torchlight MMORPG. After a lengthy closed alpha during 2019, Echtra Games revealed in January 2020 that the game was to be completely rebranded as Torchlight III, a more traditional follow-up to the previous games. Torchlight III will be a premium game as its predecessors were and all microtransactions from the F2P iteration of the title will be removed.

== Reception ==
=== Critical reception ===
Reception

Aggregate score
Aggregator	Score
Metacritic	PC: 88/100; NS: 81/100; PS4: 80/100; XONE: 78/100

Review scores
Publication	Score
Edge	8/10
Eurogamer	9/10
G4	4.5/5
Game Informer	9.25/10
GameSpot	8.5/10
GameSpy	5/5
GamesRadar+	4.5/5
GameTrailers	8.5/10
IGN	9.1/10
PC Gamer (US)	88/100
Polygon	8.5/10

Torchlight II received favorable reviews; on aggregate review website Metacritic the game attains an overall score of 88 out of 100 based on reviews from 67 professional critics.

Game Informer stated that "Torchlight II is an excellent game no matter how you slice it... the margin between [it and Diablo III] is razor-thin – and I have to give the nod to Torchlight II." IGN praised the game saying, "Torchlight II doesn't do anything radically new, but does everything incredibly well. It fits all the pieces of varied monster behavior, interesting items, excellent skill design and random surprises together into a near-perfect formula, where the action never stops and rewards are never far away." GameTrailers praised the low price point saying, "it's a polished adventure that easily justifies its reasonable $20 price tag." One of the criticisms of the game is the lack of innovation. GameSpot stated, "Torchlight II doesn't innovate and it doesn't surprise, and the genre may need an infusion of new ideas if it's going to stay vital."

During the 16th Annual D.I.C.E. Awards, the Academy of Interactive Arts & Sciences nominated Torchlight II for "Role-Playing/Massively Multiplayer Game of the Year".

=== Sales ===
The game sold over 1 million copies in 2012. As of 2015, the game had sold almost 3 million copies.
