= Gigantic (video game) =

2017 free-to-play strategic hero shooter video game

- Developer: Motiga (Note: Abstraction Games developed the Rampage Edition.)
- Publisher: Perfect World Entertainment (Note: The Rampage Edition was published by Arc Games.)
- Designer: Carter McBee
- Engine: Unreal Engine 3
- Platforms: Microsoft Windows; Xbox One; Xbox Series X/S; PlayStation 4 PlayStation 5
- Release: July 20, 2017: Gigantic; Windows, Xbox One; WW: July 20, 2017; Gigantic: Rampage Edition; Windows, PS4, PS5, Xbox One, Xbox Series X/S; WW: April 9, 2024
- Genres: Third-person shooter Team brawler
- Mode: Multiplayer

Gigantic is a multiplayer online battle arena and third-person shooter video game developed by the independent game studio Motiga and published by Perfect World Entertainment. The game focuses on team-based action combat with heroes battling alongside a massive guardian. Players must protect their guardian along with their team and attempt to destroy the opposing team and their guardian.

It was released as a free-to-play video game in 2017 for Windows and Xbox One, though its servers were shut down a year later. Abstraction Games and Arc Games revived the game as a pay-to-play title, Gigantic: Rampage Edition, in 2024 for Windows, PlayStation 4, PlayStation 5, Xbox One and Xbox Series X and Series S.

== Gameplay ==
Gigantic is a MOBA title that mixes melee combat, shooting mechanics, and general MOBA archetypes onto one game. Players control their selected Heroes, which fill the gameplay roles of a shooter, melee fighter, or spellcaster. (Between these roles, different archypes for each such as Damage Dealers, Frontliners, Tanks, Support, Assassin, etc.) Each playable character has 5 skills, which includes their basic attack and their "Focus" ability, which charges as they deal damage, heal others, etc.

With the original release and rerelease, players compete in two teams of five assisted by a magical behemoth known as a Guardian with the goal of killing the other team's Guardian. In order to kill the enemy Guardian, players must grant their own Guardian power, which is acquired by siphoning power orbs off of summoning circles or killing opposing players and creatures.

When one team successfully acquires 100 power, their guardian will enter a Rampage state and attack the other guardian, exposing its weak point and allowing the attacking team to deal damage to the enemy Guardian. The defending team has the power they collected up into that point converted onto a shield (which functions as additional health) and must defend the weak point. Additional kills and power granting events will extend the amount of time the attacking team has to damage the enemy Guardian or grants the defending team additional shield. Fully depleting its health bar will wound it. The first team to wound the opposing guardian 3 times will win.

Players can establish stronger presence on their side of the map and "Neutral" zones by summoning creatures on summoning circles. Creatures assist the team in different ways but will remain in the area they were spawned and will automatically collect power orbs on their circle. The creature will initially be summoned as a baby, but can be upgraded into an adult creature at the cost of the summoning Hero's focus, the death of a more mature creature grants more power to the enemy team than the death of a baby creature or player.

As players advance towards the goal of killing the enemy Guardian, they progressively gain a total of 10 Skill Points. They can apply 2 of these skill points as upgrades to 4 of their 5 skills, as well as an additional modification to an existing skill, and 2 buffs to the Hero's stats themselves. Many of these upgrades radically strengthen or alter the function of a skill. For example, the skill of one hero (Tyto the Swift) which allows them to jump forward and cut down a retreating enemy, can be upgraded to either inflict heavy bleeding on their victim, or to remove the attack altogether and greatly increase the skill's jumping distance. This was intentionally made to be done manually in the original 2017 release and previous beta builds, as developers wanted players to select upgrades in reaction to the trajectory of the session, but Rampage Edition adds the option to craft a "Build" of upgrades for a Hero which are automatically applied as the match progresses.

When one Guardian is reduced to 1 health bar, or enough Rampages occur, the map will become altered as each team's guardian beckons players to engage in a "Final clash". Generally, the arena will become smaller via environmental damage or players will be redirected to a smaller arena while the previous one is made uninhabitable resulting in a faster pace nearing the session's conclusion. Sanctum Falls, for example, will flood the original arena while players are beckoned to move toward the arena at the source of the flooding before it's too late.

With the release of 'Gigantic: Rampage Edition' in 2024, the original gameplay model was retroactively reintroduced as "Clash", while a faster-paced gamemode called "Rush" was added, where Guardians only have one health bar, arenas begin in their smaller form, all players are automatically max level thanks to the new "Build" mechanic, and creatures are unable to be summoned, rather automatically spawn themselves.

== Development and release ==
Developers had been talking about the game since 2013, codenamed "Raid" at the time. Gigantic was announced officially on July 15, 2014. Shortly after, on July 24 of the same year, the pre-alpha began. The game's beta was launched in August 2015. Gigantic was fully released on Steam, Arc, Xbox One, and Windows 10 on July 20, 2017.

On January 31, 2018, it was announced that further development for Gigantic had ceased and that the game's servers would be discontinued on July 31, 2018, the day that Gigantic servers officially shut down. However, from October 5 to October 7, 2023, the servers were reopened in an invite only event that allowed players to play the game again, leading to speculation that the game may be revived in the future.

In February 2024, it was announced that Gigantic would be re-released as Gigantic: Rampage Edition in April 2024 for PlayStation 4, PlayStation 5, Xbox One, Xbox Series X/S, Arc, Steam, and Epic Games Store. This edition of the game is being developed by Abstraction Games and published by Gearbox Publishing. Additionally, it will drop the free-to-play model in favor of buy-to-play and will be released with additional content. Gearbox Publishing San Francisco was rebranded into Arc Games on the day the game released.

== Reception ==
Reception

Aggregate score
Aggregator	Score
Metacritic	PC: 76/100; XONE: 74/100

Review scores
Publication	Score
Game Informer	6.5/10
GameSpot	8/10
IGN	7.9/10
Polygon	8/10

Gigantic received "generally positive" reviews, according to review aggregator Metacritic.
