= OGRE =

Open-source 3D rendering engine

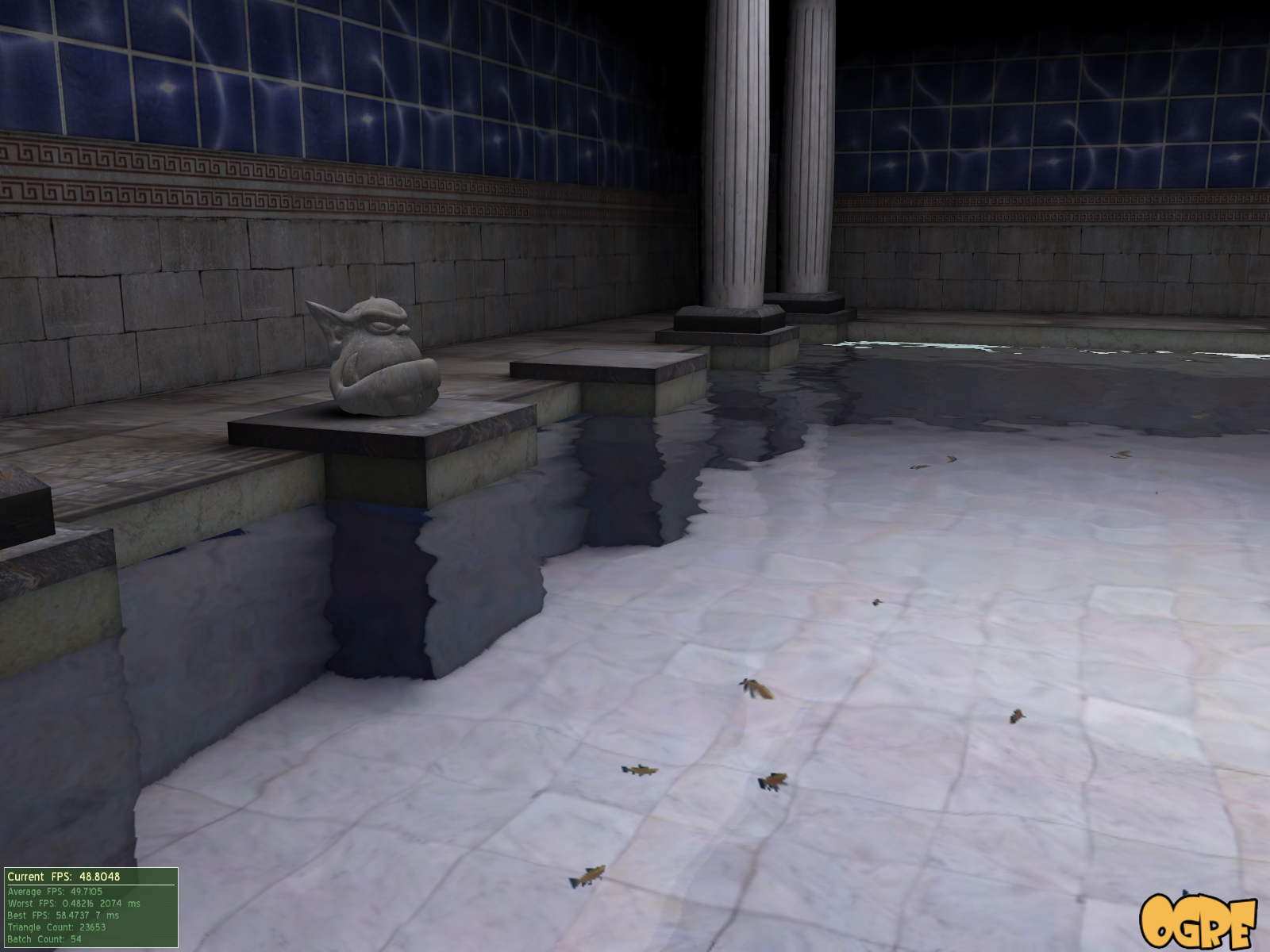
- Screenshot from the official OGRE Demos pack, from "Fresnel Reflections and Refractions" benchmark
- Developer: The OGRE Team
- Release: February 2005; 21 years ago
- Stable release: 14.5.2 / 31 January 2026; 7 months ago
- Written in: C++
- Operating system: Cross-platform software
- Platform: Linux, macOS, Windows (all major versions), Android, iOS, JavaScript (via EMScripten), Windows Phone (Sponsored by Microsoft) and WinRT.
- Type: Graphics rendering engine
- License: MIT License
- Website: www.ogre3d.org
- Repository: github.com/OGRECave/ogre

Object-Oriented Graphics Rendering Engine (OGRE) is a scene-oriented, real-time, open-source, 3D rendering engine.

Ogre has been ported to Linux, macOS, Windows, PocketPC, Xbox, and PS3.

== Functionality ==
OGRE is a C++ class library built on a modular architecture where functionality is extended via dynamically loaded plugins. Core subsystems are implemented as plugins, allowing developers to select implementations at runtime.

Essential components like the render system, image format loaders, and mesh importers are handled by this plugin system. To facilitate rapid development, the SDK integrates the Assimp library for comprehensive mesh loading and Dear ImGui for creating graphical user interfaces. This combination makes it straightforward to build applications for 3D data visualization and inspection. More broadly, the plugin architecture enables developers to tailor the engine's capabilities and footprint, such as using a full suite of asset importers for development tools while shipping a minimal set with the final product.

In addition to its native C++ API, OGRE provides official language bindings for other programming languages, such as C#, Java, and Python. These bindings are automatically generated from the C++ source code using the SWIG tool.

== History ==
Ogre originated around 1999 from DIMClass, a Direct3D abstraction project by developer Steve 'Sinbad' Streeting. Realizing its design could be made platform- and API-agnostic, he officially registered the Ogre project on SourceForge in February 2000. Active development began that October, leading to the first functional release for Win32 and Direct3D 7 in 2001.

A major milestone was the September 2002 release (v0.99d), which established Ogre as a cross-platform engine by adding Linux support and an OpenGL renderer. This version also introduced a robust skeletal animation system, and the core development team began to expand.

Further development culminated in the release of Ogre 1.0 in February 2005. The project was subsequently featured as the SourceForge Project of the Month for March 2005.

From 2006 to 2013, the project was a regular participant as a mentoring organization in the Google Summer of Code, which funded numerous student contributions to the engine's codebase.

In 2010, the engine's license was changed from the LGPL to the more permissive MIT License with the release of version 1.7. Streeting reasoned that a simpler license would better grow the community and encourage voluntary contributions, rather than trying to legally compel them. That same year, he stepped down as project lead, citing a chronic back condition that made the required time commitment unsustainable.

Since 2019, Ogre consists of two forks developed separately, namely Ogre (also called Ogre1), which is based on the original 1.x codebase and Ogre Next (also called Ogre2), which is based on the 2.x development efforts.

After the 2021 release of Ogre 1.12, the project transitioned to version Ogre 13, eliminating the "1." prefix in its numbering to align more closely with semantic versioning.

== Games and applications ==
- Earth Eternal
- Ankh
- Ankh: Heart of Osiris
- Jack Keane
- Gazebo simulator and Ignition Gazebo
- Hob
- Kenshi
- OpenMW (until v0.37.0)
- Rebel Galaxy
- Rebel Galaxy Outlaw
- Rigs of Rods
- Roblox (2009–2014)
- Running with Rifles
- Scrap Mechanic (until 2016)
- Shadows: Heretic Kingdoms
- TROUBLESHOOTER: Abandoned Children
- Torchlight & Torchlight II
- Walaber's Trampoline
- World of Battles: Morningstar (2009–2012)
- Vector Thrust
- Zombie Driver
