= Rusty Hearts =

2011 video game

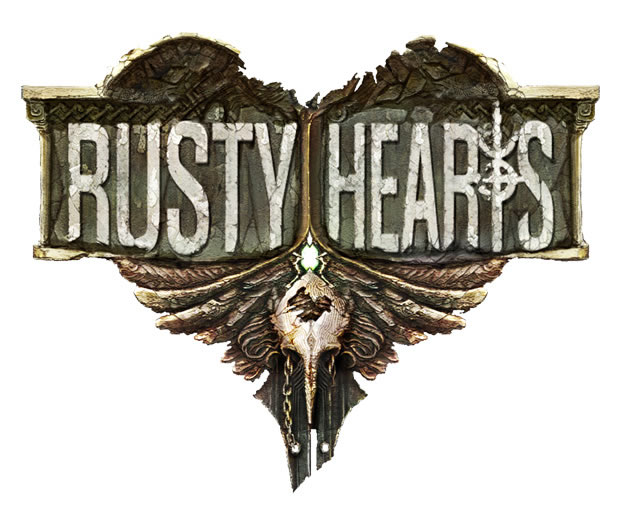
- Developer: Stairway Games Korea
- Publishers: KOR: Windysoft; NA: Perfect World Entertainment; JP: Sega; CHN: Xunlei
- Platform: Microsoft Windows
- Release: KOR: May 11, 2011; NA: September 20, 2011; JP: December 13, 2012; CHN: August 8, 2013
- Genre: MMORPG
- Mode: Multiplayer

Rusty Hearts was a free-to-play MMORPG video game developed by Stairway Games and published by Windysoft in South Korea, Perfect World Entertainment in North America, Sega in Japan and Xunlei Games in China.

== Gameplay ==
There are nine playable characters, which have their own combat styles.

=== Avatars ===
Avatar skins which replace the main default characters' appearance and sound can be purchased in the in-game cash shop. Once purchased, the new character is created from level 1. Each avatar character has small changes to differentiate from their original such as slightly different animations or the speed of their moves, but for all intents and purposes, they share the same weaponry and special moves. The cost of creating any avatar character is for free.

== Storyline ==
Long ago, the Bartbarod kingdom thrived near what is known today as Macedonia. The royal family maintained a pure bloodline until a genetic mutation nearly wiped them out and gave rise to a new race of mutants called vampires. They in turn gave rise to new race of half-breeds, causing the pure-blooded vampires to grow wary. The ruler of the Vampires at this time, Lord Vlad, decided that he would eliminate the impurities that threatened the existence of his people and declared war against humans and half-breeds alike.

After the Black Plague had swept through Europe in the 14th century, the great witch Philistia assembled the Hermetic Association of the Golden Seal, a unification of small rebel groups to fight against Lord Vlad's vampire army.

One of the nations affected by the plague was Rumania. Seeking protection from the plague, the country's royal family sealed themselves within Curtis Castle, but to no avail. Every member of the royal family succumbed to the sickness. The Hermetic Association of the Golden Seal, has tracked their target, the ancient vampire Lord Vlad, to Curtis Castle in Bramunez. Acting quickly, the Golden Seal team placed a powerful barrier upon the castle, sealing Vlad and his minions within. Now they plan their assault on Curtis Castle, to defeat Vlad once and for all.

Just as the operation begins, a group of strangers have arrived in the city of Bramunez. Calling themselves "Specialists", they possess strange and powerful abilities that the Golden Seal team would be foolish to ignore. The strangers are encouraged to join the siege on the castle, but their goals and their pasts remain mysteries; even to each other.

== Development ==
=== North America ===
The closed BETA started on the 27 July 2011; however, the high number users attempting to access the game caused long load times, and as a result many users were unable to take part in the closed BETA until the 28th of July 2011. Perfect World Entertainment announced at the launch that all Beta accounts would have their data erased prior to the release of the full game.

Phase 1 of the closed Beta ended on 17 August 2011 so that a large number of in-game changes could be implemented. Character Data was not erased in the transfer to the second closed Beta test, which began on 24 August 2011. Players who joined within the first 12 hours of the launch were given a special costume item for one character as part of the progression to open Beta.

There were initially three characters in the game (Frantz Kruger, Angela Strraugend and Tude MacLoud). These characters participate in the game's storyline. Natasha Borzenkova was added after the game was released from beta. Both Leila and Edgar were later made free and can be created via the character selection screen when the Rusty Hearts Reborn expansion pack was released.

There are characters which are free-to-play and some which are pay-to-create. For instance, unlike the first three premium characters, Leila Vergerius is initially free-to-play, but to obtain her, the player's account must be connected to Facebook. After the update patch on 31 January 2013, Meilin Chen, Roselle Vergerius, Edgar Grosvenor and Leila Vergerius are now free on the North American server.

On 29 July 2014, Perfect World Entertainment announced the sunsetting of Rusty Hearts. The servers have been shut down since 15 September 2014.
