= Torchlight =

2009 action role-playing game

- The retail box art for Torchlight features the game's three character classes: from left to right, the Vanquisher, Destroyer, and Alchemist.
- Developer: Runic Games
- Publishers: Perfect World Entertainment; Microsoft Studios (X360)
- Designer: Travis Baldree
- Composer: Matt Uelmen
- Series: Torchlight
- Engine: OGRE
- Platforms: Microsoft Windows; OS X Xbox 360 (XBLA); Linux
- Release: Windows: WW: October 27, 2009; OS X: WW: May 12, 2010; Xbox 360: WW: March 9, 2011; Linux: WW: September 18, 2012
- Genres: Action role-playing, hack and slash
- Mode: Single-player

Torchlight is an action role-playing hack and slash dungeon crawler video game developed by Runic Games and published by Perfect World Entertainment. It was originally released for Windows in October 2009. The fantasy-themed game is set in the fictional town of Torchlight and the expansive caverns and dungeons nearby, which adventurers explore to collect valuable loot and battle hordes of monsters. Following the October 2009 digital distribution release, a Windows retail box version was released in the U.S. in January 2010 by Encore, Inc, and JoWooD Entertainment published a retail box in Europe in April 2010. A port for OS X was developed by World Domination Industries and released through Steam on May 12, 2010. Runic Games and World Domination Industries developed a port for Xbox Live Arcade which was released on March 9, 2011. A Linux port was released as part of the game's inclusion in the Humble Indie Bundle 6.

Development of the game was led by Travis Baldree, designer of Fate, joined by Max Schaefer and Erich Schaefer (co-designers of Diablo and Diablo II), and the team that worked with Baldree on the original incarnation of Mythos. In September 2012, Runic Games released a sequel, Torchlight II, for Windows. In 2020, Echtra Games released Torchlight III.

== Gameplay ==
A Destroyer engages in combat against undead monsters. The bar at the bottom of the screen displays skills activated by hotkeys.

The player controls a lone hero who explores a series of randomized dungeons, fighting large numbers of enemies and collecting equipment, gold, and other loot. The game also features a single town which serves as a hub, to which the player character can periodically return to buy and sell items to NPC vendors and obtain quests. As the protagonist delves into the dungeon, a series of quests are presented which involve battling unique bosses that advance the main storyline. Optionally, the player may take on side quests, random quests or visit branching dungeon areas. The graphics are three dimensional and viewed from an overhead perspective, similar to the isometric perspective used in the original Diablo. On personal computers, the game is controlled using a point-and-click mouse interface and keyboard hotkeys, while the Xbox Live Arcade version uses a controller and has a completely redesigned user interface.

The game generates each level of the dungeon by assembling modular "chunks" of the game environment. Each chunk is designed by hand and may be composed of multiple rooms. They can contain scripted events and interactive objects such as levers that open secret doors or cause bridges to move. This approach to level generation is intended to create dungeons with more purposeful design, instead of environments that simply look like "crossword puzzles that have been extruded upwards."

As in Fate, the player has a permanent pet which fights alongside and can carry and sell loot. The initial pet can be a wolf dog, a lynx or, in the retail version of the game, a ferret; the player can feed fish to their pet to transform it into different creatures.

Also present in the game is a retirement system, in which the player can pass on an heirloom item from an old character to a newly created one, likened to a New Game Plus game mode.

Torchlight features three character classes.

- The Destroyer is a wandering warrior skilled in melee combat, although he also has the ability to call upon ancestral spirits to produce magical effects.
- The Alchemist is a spellcaster drawn to the magical power of Ember. He can fire blasts of magic and electricity from his specialized focus glove and can summon imps and steampunk-styled robots.
- The Vanquisher is an elite city guard, sent undercover to investigate the town of Torchlight. She specializes in ranged weapons and can also use traps against her foes.

The player develops their character by placing points into class-specific skill trees. Further, there is a separate category of spells that any character can learn from scrolls, regardless of class.

== Plot ==
In the fantasy world that serves as the setting of Torchlight, there is a mysterious ore known as Ember which has the power to imbue people and items with magical power. The mining boomtown called Torchlight is built above a rich vein of Ember, and adventurers are drawn to the town seeking the magical substance and the enchanted items it creates. However, as the player character explores the dungeons below Torchlight, they discover that Ember has a corrupting influence which led to the fall of past civilizations and endangers those who use it in the present.

The player character arrives in town and is recruited by Syl, a sage who is searching for her mentor, an alchemist named Master Alric, who has disappeared in the nearby mine. At the bottom of the mine tunnels, the player finds a passage into older, crypt-like chambers below, eventually discovering that the entire dungeon is a "layer cake of ruined civilizations." Alric ambushes the player and reveals he has become evil due to the corrupting influence of Ember. After fighting a series of monsters and henchmen to reach the bottom of the dungeon, the player must face Alric and an ancient creature named Ordrak, the source of the Ember's corruption.

== Development ==
Pre-production on Torchlight began in August 2008, shortly after the dissolution of Flagship Studios. Runic Games was founded by Travis Baldree (lead developer of Fate and Mythos) and veterans of Blizzard North and Flagship: Max Schaefer, Erich Schaefer and Peter Hu. The "entire Flagship Seattle team" consisting of 14 people (the branch of Flagship which created the original Mythos) signed on to Runic Games at the time of its formation. Having lost the rights to Mythos, the Runic team saw the development of a new game as a way to "finish what [they] started," although they would have to start over with none of the code or art assets from Mythos. From the start, the company's ultimate goal was the development of a massively multiplayer online role-playing game with gameplay similar to that of Mythos or Diablo, but before tackling the MMO, Runic's founders decided to "go back to [their] roots" with a smaller game that they could refine and polish within a relatively short production cycle. This single player game was intended to introduce the Torchlight game world to the public ahead of the MMO. Further, it allowed the team to get a released game under their belts sooner than if they had immediately started on the MMO. Full production on the game started around November 2008, giving the entire project a development period of approximately 11 months. As of July 2009, 25 team members were working at Runic Games.

In a feature article on Gamasutra, art director Jason Beck explained that Torchlight's art style was inspired by comic books and classic film animation, using stylized character designs combined with painterly background textures. The developers have described the game's look as inspired by "Dragon's Lair meets The Incredibles." The team chose to give the game world a lighter fantasy tone to make it more inviting, rather than utilizing a "dark and gritty" style.

The game uses the OGRE open-source 3D graphics engine and CEGUI system for GUI, although the rest of the game engine was built by Runic. The game was designed to run on a wide range of systems (including a 'netbook' mode) and does not require shaders.

=== Audio ===
Diablo composer and sound designer Matt Uelmen also joined the team, creating original music and sound for the game. Uelmen based his score on the pacing and context of the gameplay, which he observed even in very early playable builds of the game. For the "Torchlight" town theme, Uelmen incorporated some elements reminiscent of his "Tristram" theme from Diablo, but also tried to give it a distinctly different sound. For this piece, he recorded over 200 live takes using a twelve-string guitar among other instruments. For other portions of the score, he played a pedal steel guitar, and created a different sound from the instrument's typical use in country music.

The developers cast voice actors with the help of veteran voice actress Lani Minella, who also performed in the game.

=== Xbox 360 development ===
In August 2010, Runic CEO Max Schaefer revealed that the game was in development for the PlayStation 3 and Xbox 360, aiming for release by the end of the year. In January 2011, Runic announced that Torchlight would be released for Xbox Live Arcade (XBLA) in early 2011, but a release for PlayStation 3 was no longer planned. Because Microsoft is acting as publisher of the XBLA release, Torchlight will likely remain exclusive to the Xbox 360 on consoles.

The Xbox 360 port was developed as a collaboration between Runic Games and World Domination Industries. Runic became more heavily involved in the port in mid-2010 when it became clear that its controls and graphical interface required a complete overhaul to adapt for use with console-style controllers. As such, the player character is now directly driven by the controller without any virtual cursors. The game also includes some new content such as additional armor sets and a new pet, and incorporates technology developed for Torchlight II including character animation blending and an improved automap.

=== Modding ===
The PC version of Torchlight is designed to allow extensive modding by players, and Runic Games has released the game editing tools they used to create the game as a free download. The editor, known as "TorchED" is intended to be intuitive to use and allows the user to switch between editing levels and playing in them without leaving the editor. Player, monster, and item statistics, language translations, and even particle systems can be customized within the editor. TorchED is also capable of editing quest events, scripting, and global game balance. Further, the game uses publicly available file formats, allowing users to import models and animations with relative ease.

== Reception ==
=== Critical reception ===
Reception

Aggregate score
Aggregator	Score
Metacritic	PC: 83/100; X360: 81/100

Review scores
Publication	Score
1Up.com	A
Eurogamer	8/10
Game Informer	8.75/10
GameSpot	8.0/10
GamesRadar+	9/10
IGN	8.6/10
RPGamer	4.5/5

Awards
Publication	Award
RPGFan	E3 2009 PC RPG of Show
GDC	2010 Best Debut Game

Torchlight received positive reviews; the PC release currently holds a score of 83 out of 100 on Metacritic while the Xbox 360 release holds a score of 81 out of 100.

Writing for RPGamer, staff reviewer Anna Marie Neufeld praised Torchlight's "phenomenal music and great art direction" as well as its addictive combat but criticized the game's storyline as shallow. Rock, Paper, Shotgun reviewer John Walker found the core gameplay to be a highly focused and engaging refinement of the dungeon crawl genre, albeit one with a "tissue-thin" story and quests. In his review in Game Informer, Adam Biessener listed responsive controls, attractive animations and effects, and clever enemy designs as some qualities that set Torchlight above most other action RPGs. GameSpot's Brett Todd found the game's pace engaging, noting a deep variety of monsters and loot, but found the lack of multiplayer to be an omission. Several reviewers cited the game's low price as a positive point. The Australian video game talk show Good Game's two reviewers gave the game a 7/10 and 8.5/10.

Many reviewers compared the game to the Diablo series, some describing it as the best Diablo-like game since Diablo II and "the best Diablo clone in years." Adam Biessener of Game Informer stated that "the soul of Diablo hasn't been so ably captured in years," and The Escapist's John Funk wrote "Torchlight absolutely nails the formula that made Diablo so addictive." RPGamer stated that Torchlight "manages to overcome the Diablo expectations by being a game that can stand on its own merits." Satchmo on the blog Press X to Continue gave an overall score of 9/10 saying that "It is a fine entry into a genre that doesn't have much representation on the Xbox".

=== Sales ===
In July 2011, Torchlight sales surpassed 1 million copies. As of 2015, the game has sold almost 2 million copies.

=== Awards ===
Torchlight won the Best Debut Game Award at the 2010 Game Developers Choice Awards.

== Sequels ==
On August 4, 2010 Runic Games announced Torchlight II, a continuation of the story, featuring a co-op mode, new player characters, an "overworld" with multiple outdoor areas, and a new user interface. Although the developers originally estimated a 2011 release, the game was finally released in 2012.

Runic Games had originally planned to begin work on an MMORPG set in the Torchlight game world immediately following the release of the first game. Runic entered into a partnership with Chinese online game developer and operator Perfect World Co., Ltd. to publish the MMO worldwide. At some point after the release of the first game, Runic Games decided to develop a sequel to Torchlight with co-op multiplayer capabilities, temporarily putting the MMO on the back burner. On September 20, 2012, the developers revealed they were no longer pursuing plans to create an MMO in the Torchlight universe.

While Runic Games had been shuttered by Perfect World in 2017, Perfect World held the rights to the Torchlight IP. In mid-2018, the company announced Torchlight Frontiers, a shared world game developed by Echtra Games, a studio within Perfect World founded by Runic's Max Schaefer. Frontiers was renamed Torchlight III in January 2020. It was released later that year on Windows, PlayStation 4, Xbox One, and Nintendo Switch.
