= Fate: Undiscovered Realms =

2008 video game

- Developers: WildStudios, WildTangent
- Publishers: WildTangent; Encore Software
- Series: Fate
- Platform: Microsoft Windows
- Release: NA: July 17, 2008
- Genres: Action role-playing, roguelike
- Mode: Single-player

Fate: Undiscovered Realms is an action role-playing roguelike video game developed by WildTangent and released on July 17, 2008, as a stand-alone expansion to the 2005 PC game Fate. The retail version sold in stores includes the original game as well. It was followed by a second expansion, Fate: The Traitor Soul, in 2009.

Like its predecessor and sequels, Undiscovered Realm was remastered and included in the Fate: Reawakened collection released on Steam, Nintendo Switch, PlayStation 5, and Xbox Series X and S on March 12, 2025.

== Gameplay ==
Like Fate, FUR is a fantasy action role-playing game similar to Diablo and Diablo II. This type of game is also known as a dungeon crawler, where the player takes their character through progressively more difficult levels of a dungeon, fighting monsters, completing quests, collecting valuable items and gold, and improving the character's attributes and skills along the way. The dungeons in FUR are fully randomized for each level; the layout, treasures and monsters are all different each time you visit one. Users are given the option to import their character from Fate if they own the first game.

The game is advertised as having infinite dungeon levels, although this is not technically true: according to the publisher's website forum, at level 2,147,483,647 (2^31-1) the game runs into computing problems and the character can go no further.

== Plot ==
The hero of the town of Grove has completed his quest and celebrates his victory. But during the festivities an unusual old man appears and convinces the hero to come with him, telling him that another great evil has arisen. The old man has tricked the hero, and opened the Book of Fate, gaining its powers. The hero must now stop this new foe by exploring the dungeons of Druantia, a realm of mossy forest and dry tunnels, and Typhon, a frozen tundra and arctic wasteland.

In this game, the town of Grove has been replaced with three new realms: the Outpost of Druantia, the Outpost of Typhon and the Temple of Fate. Each realm features new randomized dungeons, shopkeepers and non-player characters (NPCs). Each dungeon is only about half the size of the original dungeon in Fate. Players start in the Temple of Fate where they are given quests to enter and complete the dungeons of Typhon and Druantia. There are also two statues in the Temple: in specific levels the player will find missing equipment which they must then put on the corresponding statues. When all the missing clothing has been put back on, the statue will release a prize, and a potion which will turn the player's pet into the hero that the statue depicts. The statue will release the potion as many times as the player wants, but the prize is only released once. Once the first two realms have been completed, the player must return to the quest-givers in the Temple of Fate, whereupon a new dungeon is unlocked and the player tasked with defeating the lord of the dungeon and final boss in the game, Kaos. It is a mystery what happened to the evil old man from the introduction, but it is possible that Kaos and the old man are the same being.

== Customizations ==
Like many other games in its class, Fate has an active modding community. The developers have released tools to aid in the creation of mods and over 10,000 mods exist in a community database. Mods for Fate range from simple potions and weapons to new spells and pets. The community has created tutorials for creating new weapons, armor, spells, monsters, and other such items. One pitfall of these activities is the stability of the game.

Fate: Undiscovered Realms introduces a new mod-inserting system, with which the user can just move/copy the mod folders into a specific folder called "REALMS" in which the realms from the base game are located too. All mods moved here can be manually removed and changed. The introduced system is more stable than the mod manager and manually modding. The number of mods does not increase loading times.

== Reception ==
Fate: Undiscovered Realms received fairly positive reviews from critics, garnering a score of 7.0 from both GameSpot and IGN. In his review for GameSpot, Brett Todd praised the simple charm and addictive gameplay carried over from the original Fate but criticized the fact that only a few new features have been added, calling it more of an extension of the original rather than an expansion. IGN reviewer Jimmy Thang called it a solid addition to the hack and slash genre albeit one hindered by uninspired dungeon design.
