= Kenshi (video game) =

2018 video game

- Developer: Lo-Fi Games
- Publisher: Lo-Fi Games
- Designer: Chris Hunt
- Engine: OGRE
- Platform: Windows
- Release: December 6, 2018
- Genre: Role-playing
- Mode: Single-player

Kenshi is a real-time strategy and action role-playing game developed and published by Lo-Fi Games for Windows. The game focuses on sandbox gameplay features that give the player freedom to do what they want in its world instead of focusing on a linear story. Kenshi's development was primarily led by a single person over the course of twelve years, and it was released on December 6, 2018.

Kenshi takes place in a post-apocalyptic setting and allows the player to freely customize all facets of their characters' personality and role in the game world. The game has received mostly positive reviews from critics, who have commented on its depth and difficulty.

== Gameplay ==
Kenshi has a damage system where players and enemies can lose limbs after battles and have to permanently deal with the consequences.

Kenshi is a role-playing video game with real-time strategy elements that has no linear narrative. It takes place in an open world post-apocalyptic setting, where it is incredibly difficult for life to survive. In the default start, the player starts out with no skills and struggles to survive in the early stages of the game. Skills are leveled up through doing actions, such as leveling up thievery by stealing items, various combat skills by fighting, and the player can recruit other units to grow their squad. The player can recruit both named and generic characters from numerous different factions and species to join their squad, and can eventually build an outpost themselves.

In combat, each part of the body has an individual health bar, with different races having different health. Reaching negative health can cripple a character, imposing different skill penalties depending on which body part is damaged. limbs can be severed if damaged enough, with the option to replace them with prosthetic limbs. Kenshi has many non-player locations, of sizes ranging from a single building to large cities. The game includes a world states system which creates reactions to deaths of notable people. These reactions to power vacuums can result in new locations spawning or in towns being taken over by new factions. The map is split into multiple "Zones".

== Development ==
Kenshi was primarily developed by a single person, Chris Hunt, who began development around 2006–2008 in Ogre Engine. Hunt worked as a part-time security guard in order to make ends meet for the first few years of the game's development. After five or so years of working his security job, Hunt was able to leave his part-time job and work on the game full-time after finding initial success with the game. He worked by himself on the project until 2013, when he was able to hire a small team that helped him with the project. Hunt has described the world as "sword-punk", and was specifically inspired by stories of wandering rōnin and the idea of a survivor traveling a wasteland.

Hunt has described his impetus for creating the game as his dislike of the "hand-holding" that other RPGs have when starting out. On his general mantra for designing the game, Hunt stated that he considered himself as the player's enemy. The game's playable area is 870 square kilometres (340 sq mi), which was done to place dangerous and challenging areas in between rewards that players might seek out. Hunt wanted different areas of the map to have different themes or factions that would make them feel unique, such as one that treats female characters differently than males.

The game was released in March 2013 as one of the initial games featured in Steam's early access program. It had its full release on December 6, 2018.

== Reception ==
Reception

Aggregate score
Aggregator	Score
Metacritic	75/100

Review score
Publication	Score
PC Gamer (US)	84/100

Kenshi received "generally favorable reviews", according to review aggregator website Metacritic. PC Gamer's Robert Zak praised the game's giant size and scope, but noted that the game could get "grindy" and that the game's UI "can get cumbersome as your group's numbers grow." Rock, Paper, Shotgun noted the game's depth and compared Kenshi positively to Dwarf Fortress.

In September 2020, Lo-Fi Games announced that Kenshi had sold over a million copies. By May 2026, the game sold 3 million copies.

== Prequel ==
In March 2019, a prequel built in Unreal Engine, Kenshi 2, was announced.
