= Rebel Galaxy Outlaw =

- Developer: Double Damage Games
- Publisher: Double Damage Games
- Engine: OGRE
- Platforms: Microsoft Windows; Nintendo Switch; PlayStation 4; Xbox One
- Release: Microsoft Windows; August 13, 2019; Nintendo Switch, PlayStation 4, Xbox One; September 22, 2020
- Genre: Space flight simulator
- Mode: Single-player

Rebel Galaxy Outlaw is a space trading and combat simulation game developed and published by Double Damage Games. It is the prequel to Rebel Galaxy.

It was released for Microsoft Windows on August 13, 2019, and later for Nintendo Switch, PlayStation 4, Xbox One on September 22, 2020.

== Gameplay ==
Rebel Galaxy Outlaw places players in the cockpit of a fighter spacecraft and emphasizes dogfight-style combat. In contrast to the capital ships of Rebel Galaxy, players have full degree of movement in space as opposed to their ship being confined to a two-dimensional plane of movement in the first game. Outlaw introduces an optional flight assist feature that players can activate on lower difficulties to have their ship automatically track and pursue a selected target.

In order to acquire better ships, weapons, and equipment, players must earn money by taking on various missions such as bounty hunting, defending colonies from pirates, delivering cargo, and scouting unexplored tracts of space. Players can also mine for resources and trade goods on the open market, or turn to piracy themselves. The game also includes a number of minigames at station bars in the form of slot machines, pool, and an arcade game similar to Asteroids.

Players of the Windows version of Outlaw can paint the outside of their ship using a detailed in-game interface that has been likened to Adobe Photoshop. The feature is not available in any of the console versions due to technical limitations.

== Plot ==
The player is Juno Markev, a former space pirate of the DoubleJacks gang and the aunt of the player character in Rebel Galaxy. Ten years before the events of Rebel Galaxy, Juno retired from the DoubleJacks after marrying her husband, Brace, and settled into the quiet life of a law-abiding citizen in the backwater Dodge Sector. When she receives word from Brace's friend Connor McCarthy that Brace was murdered on a trading run by a man named Ruthless, Juno hunts him down in the Texas system, but bungles her attempt to kill him and is shot down. Broke and without a ship, Juno asks for a favor from her old contact Orzu, who lets her have an obsolete garbage scow to get back on her feet in return for delivering a stolen weapons system to him. Orzu then directs Juno to the android mercenary Satchel, who knows how to find Ruthless.

While waiting for Satchel to find a lead, Juno is roped into rejoining the DoubleJacks by her friend Marla in order to break Ansel, the gang's original leader, out of prison and get rid of his disliked successor. After this interlude, Satchel returns with word of Ruthless's location. When Juno finally confronts Ruthless, he is adamant that he had nothing to do with Brace's death and suggests Connor was playing an angle. The two cooperate to locate Connor and force him to divulge the truth: Brace is still alive, and he bribed Connor to lie about his death. Brace eventually contacts Juno himself and reveals that he carried out the scheme at the behest of Juno's mother, Tatiana Markev.

Meanwhile, Juno has also been coerced into helping CEO Xander Brust of Brust Arms, the company that she stole Orzu's weapons system from, investigate the disappearance of several shipping convoys. A battlecruiser equipped with a superweapon is found to be the culprit, and Juno later captures a pilot who connects the superweapon to Tatiana. When Juno and Tatiana reunite, the latter explains that she has been assembling a burgeoning criminal empire as a gift to Juno; Tatiana had hoped Brace's false death would shake Juno out of her complacency and prepare her to run the empire. Juno angrily rejects her mother's plans, but is soon arrested by the Dodge Sector Police for her part in Ansel's escape. To regain her freedom, Juno must choose between helping the police capture Tatiana, or warning Tatiana and helping her pirate armada, the Red Devils, wipe out the police fleet. In both outcomes, Brace subsequently reaches out to Juno again and asks to meet back in the Texas system, where Juno can decide whether to stay with him or leave him for good.

== Reception ==
Reception

Aggregate score
Aggregator	Score
Metacritic	PC: 77/100

Review scores
Publication	Score
GameSpot	8/10
IGN	8/10

Rebel Galaxy Outlaw received "generally favorable" reviews according to review aggregator website Metacritic.
