= Livelock (video game) =

2016 top-down shooter video game

- Developer: Tuque Games
- Publisher: Perfect World Entertainment
- Composer: Vibe Avenue
- Platforms: Windows; PlayStation 4 Xbox One
- Release: August 30, 2016
- Genre: Multidirectional shooter
- Modes: Single-player, multiplayer

Livelock is a twin-stick shooter video game with both solo and cooperative multiplayer gameplay, It was developed by Montreal-based Tuque Games and published by Perfect World Entertainment on August 30, 2016. Livelock has been described as similar to the Diablo series, but with guns and in a post-apocalyptic setting.

== Development and release ==
The game was first announced in January 2016. It is the first game by Perfect World Entertainment that is not a free-to-play title. The game became part of the Xbox Games With Gold program in September 2018.

== Reception ==
The game received "mixed or average reviews" from 14 PC and PlayStation 4 (PS4) industry critics, and "generally favorable reviews" from 7 Xbox One industry critics, and holding aggregated Metacritic scores of 73/100 69/100 and 77/100, for its PC, PS4, and Xbox One versions respectively.
