= Invoke Studios =

Canadian video game developer

- Formerly: Tuque Games (2012–2022)
- Type: Division
- Industry: Video games
- Founded: 2012; 14 years ago
- Founders: Jeff Hattem
- Headquarters: Montreal, Quebec, Canada
- Key people: Jeff Hattem (head of studio)
- Owner: Hasbro (2019–present)
- Number of employees: 60 (2020)
- Parent: Wizards of the Coast (2019–present)
- Website: https://invokestudios.com/

Invoke Studios, formerly Tuque Games, is a Canadian video game developer based in Montreal, Quebec, Canada. The company was founded by Jeff Hattem, formerly of Ubisoft and Behaviour Interactive, in 2012. The company released its first game Livelock in partnership with publisher Perfect World Entertainment in 2016. Tuque Games released a Dungeons & Dragons game called Dark Alliance in 2021.

== History ==
Tuque Games was founded in 2012. began work on a sci-fi RPG titled World War Machine in 2014. They employed researchers from nanotechnology and aerospace defense fields to help develop the game. Concept art for the game was created by Aaron Beck, known for work on District 9, Mad Max: Fury Road, and Elysium, while the story was done by Daniel H. Wilson, author of Robopocalypse. World War Machine became the first submission accepted through the Square Enix Collective in April 2014. World War Machine was renamed to Livelock in 2016. It was the first buy-to-play game published by Perfect World Entertainment.

Tuque Games started developing a Dungeons & Dragons game in partnership with Wizards of the Coast with a team of 12 in early 2017. In March 2019, the company announced that the Dungeons & Dragons game was in development. Wizards of the Coast then acquired Tuque Games in October 2019. Dungeons & Dragons: Dark Alliance was officially announced with a teaser trailer shown during The Game Awards 2019 on December 12, 2019.

Tuque Games rebranded to Invoke Studios in late 2022.

== Games ==
Year	Title	System
2016	Livelock	Windows, PlayStation 4, Xbox One
2021	Dungeons & Dragons: Dark Alliance	Windows, PlayStation 4, PlayStation 5, Xbox One, Xbox Series X/S
2027	Warlock: Dungeons & Dragons	Windows, PlayStation 5, Xbox Series X/S
