= Diablo II: Lord of Destruction =

Expansion pack for the action role-playing video game Diablo II

- Cover art featuring Baal
- Developer: Blizzard North
- Publisher: Blizzard Entertainment
- Director: Tyler Thompson
- Producers: Matt Householder; Ken Williams
- Designer: Peter Brevik
- Writers: Evan Carroll; Matt Householder; Chris Metzen; Joe Morrissey
- Composer: Matt Uelmen
- Series: Diablo
- Platforms: Windows; Mac OS; OS X
- Release: Windows, Mac OS: NA/EU: June 29, 2001; AU: July 20, 2001; OS X March 11, 2016
- Genre: Action role-playing
- Modes: Single-player, multiplayer

Diablo II: Lord of Destruction is an expansion pack for the hack and slash action role-playing game Diablo II. Unlike the original Diablo's expansion pack, Diablo: Hellfire, it is a first-party expansion developed by Blizzard North. The expansion and original game were remastered and released as Diablo II: Resurrected.

Lord of Destruction added content in the form of two new character classes, new weapons and an addition of a fifth act, and also dramatically revamped the gameplay of the existing Diablo II for solo and especially multiplayer.

== Features ==
Placing the runes "Jah", "Ith" and "Ber" (in that order) into an armour item with exactly three sockets produces the powerful Rune word "Enigma".

Lord of Destruction adds a number of new features to the core gameplay of Diablo II. These include:

- Two new character classes: the Assassin and the Druid.
- A fifth act taking place in and around Mount Arreat in the northern Barbarian Highlands, with an additional act boss, Baal.
- Many new items, including new weapons and new pieces of armor:
  - 33 different Runes, which can be placed into sockets and provide different bonuses from gems.
    - Runewords are specific sequences of runes which grant a specific set of additional bonuses (similar to the preselected bonuses of unique quality items) when socketed into an appropriate item.
  - Hundreds of additional Horadric Cube recipes.
    - Crafted items are very similar to rare quality items but they cannot be found in chests or dropped by monsters. They can be created with the Horadric Cube and the right ingredients. They have 3-4 predetermined properties determined by the recipe and up to 4 additional randomly selected from the same pool as rare item properties.
  - Jewels gain the same random bonuses that items can. These can be placed into sockets. They have the same effect no matter what the base item is. Unique jewels are Rainbow Facets which have different bonuses to a certain element.
  - Ethereal items that are normally more powerful than their standard counterparts, but they have lowered durability and cannot be repaired. However, if equipped by an NPC companion they do not lose durability. A specific rune that gives the 'Indestructible' bonus when socketed can fix the durability issue of ethereal items permanently. (There are different Ethereal items which have bonus stats that make them repair durability on their own)
  - Charms that can be kept in the inventory and provide passive bonuses.
  - Class-specific items that can only be used by a certain character, e.g. Claws for an Assassin.
  - Additional unique and set items, including class-specific sets.
- An expanded stash for storing items—two times the size of the original stash.
- An alternate weapon/shield/spell setup that can be switched to via a hotkey in gameplay.
- Hirelings can now follow the player through all the Acts. They can also be equipped with armor and a weapon, can gain their own experience, when before they leveled up with the player, can be healed by potions, and can be resurrected when killed.
- The game can now be played at 800x600 resolution, up from 640x480.

== Plot ==
After the player successfully ventures into Hell and defeats Diablo in Act IV, upon returning to the Pandemonium Fortress they are met by the Archangel Tyrael with an urgent summons. Tyrael opens a portal to Harrogath, a stronghold on Mount Arreat in the northern Barbarian Highlands. As shown at the end of Act IV, while two of the Prime Evils of Hell, Diablo and Mephisto, have been defeated and their Soulstones destroyed at the Hellforge, their surviving brother Baal has retrieved his own Soulstone from the narrator Marius. Baal has raised an army and attacked Mount Arreat, whose Barbarian inhabitants are tasked with defending the Worldstone.

There are six quests in Act V. The player starts off at the stronghold of Harrogath. There are also ice caverns in the mountains, as well as hellish subterranean pits (reminiscent of Hell in Act IV) for extra monsters and experience. After reaching the summit of Arreat, the player gains access to the Worldstone Keep.

Many of the folk in Harrogath do not initially trust the player character (even if they are playing as the Barbarian class). The player has to slay Shenk the Overseer who is leading the assault in the Bloody Foothills in order to relieve the siege of Harrogath. The player can also rescue the captured Barbarian defenders. Completing these quests gradually helps the town inhabitants warm to the player and they will provide aid or other services.

The player soon discovers that one of Harrogath's councilors or Elders, Nihlathak, has made a deal with Baal to spare Harrogath in return for access to the Worldstone Keep. After rescuing Anya and learning of this betrayal, the player has to find and kill Nihlathak, who is sheltered between his minions in the Halls of Vaught.

Before gaining access to the Worldstone Keep, the player must defeat The Ancients, which are the three legendary Barbarians guarding the Worldstone – Talic the Defender, Madawc the Guardian and Korlic the Protector – who allow only the worthy to pass. After the player succeeds, the Ancients warn that Baal is already in the Keep and has blocked Tyrael's presence.

Finally, the player fights Baal in The Worldstone Chamber, after defeating his pack of minions at the Throne of Destruction. Tyrael appears after Baal is dead, congratulating the player and opening a portal to Destruction's End, the conclusion of the game. As the Worldstone is corrupted by Baal, Tyrael has no choice but to destroy it before its power of Hell takes root; the consequences of the Worldstone's destruction would not be fully known until twenty years later.

== New classes ==
=== Assassin ===
The Assassin relies on a mixture of martial arts skills and the ability to lay active traps. She can also open locked chests without the use of a key. The Assassin is voiced by Carrie Gordon Lowrey.

Her Shadow Disciplines tree contains a mixture of passive bonuses (such as Claw Mastery or Weapon Block) and buffs (such as Burst of Speed or Venom), along with a few spells such as Mind Blast which damage, stun, and confuse the enemy. She also can summon a Shadow Warrior or Shadow Master, which are useful summons that are also capable of dealing significant damage themselves.

The Traps tree provides a few direct attacks, and more importantly, a number of summonable traps. The traps are stationary devices that will attack any hostile target in range a certain number of times before breaking. Traps are either based on fire or lightning, though the Death Sentry trap can explode nearby corpses in addition to shooting bolts of lightning. The blade trap skills are essentially ranged projectiles that cause physical damage.

The Martial Arts tree consists of charge-up skills and finishing moves. Attacking with a charge-up skill increases the number of charges, up to three, then the finishing move releases the charges in a single powerful blow (note that a normal attack also counts as a finishing move). The charge-up skills include attacks like Blades of Ice and Fists of Fire, which add elemental damage to the finishing blow, and also skills like Cobra Strike, which adds life and mana stealing to the finishing attack. The finishing blows are, for the most part, kicks, such as Dragon Talon, which releases a number of kicks in quick succession, and Dragon Flight, which teleports on to a target and kicks them, releasing any charges.

=== Druid ===
The Druid specialises in nature-based magic and shapeshifting, with direct damage spells and a variety of minions. The Druid is voiced by Michael Bell.

The Elemental tree consists of the magic of earth and sky. The 'storm' spells have effects like Cyclone Armor, which protects the Druid from the elements, and Tornado, a vortex of swirling winds that moves somewhat randomly and can deal massive damage. The 'fire' spells are more earthly than the Sorceress's, with spells like Fissure and Volcano. The ultimate Elemental spells are Hurricane and Armageddon; both create a storm that follows the Druid, damaging all that come too close.

The Summoning tree governs the calling of natural allies to the Druid. While the wolves and grizzly the Druid can summon are traditional melee summons, the other summoning spells are a bit different. Ravens do marginal damage, but can blind enemies and cannot be targeted. Ravens disappear after they have attacked a certain number of times. The Druid can summon will-o-the-wisp-like spirits that provide Paladin-like Auras, increasing damage, life, or returning damage back to the attacker (like the Necromancer's Iron Maiden). The Druid also can summon one of three vines. These can poison enemies from below, or consume corpses to replenish the Druid's life or mana.

The Shape-Shifting tree gives the Druid the ability to become an animal, with gigantic bonuses to life. The Druid may either become a nimble Werewolf or a large Werebear. Each form has its own special attacks, such as the Werewolf's Feral Rage, which causes the Druid to get faster and faster as he continues to attack enemies, and the Werebear's Maul, which makes the Druid swing harder and harder during attacks. The Werebear is also able to obtain substantially more life and armor than the Werewolf is. It is worth noting that all of the Druid's equipment functions as normal when shifted, if at different speeds, but the druid is virtually unable to cast spells, except for Armageddon and summoning ones.

== Music ==
The Diablo II: Lord of Destruction score was recorded in Bratislava, Slovakia with the Slovak Radio Symphony Orchestra. Kirk Trevor of the Knoxville Symphony Orchestra conducted the sessions. The music for it was written in September 2000, it was the first time that Matt Uelmen worked with the orchestra. The orchestral session for Slovakia was in January 2001.

The style of the score is modern classical and experimental, trying to impose with a Wagnerian style.

=== Music inspirations ===
- "Fortress" from Act V of the game, inspired by variety of operatic scores, one of them would be Claude Debussy's Pelléas and Mélisande, with a direct musical reference to a phrase from the middle of "Scene 1: Je ne pourrai" from Act I of Debussy's play.
- "Ice Caves" from Act V inspired by fragments of Bernard Herrmann's "Vertigo" and a sequence of Carl Orff's "Trionfo di Afrodite".
- "Ancients" from Act V contains a direct quote from Richard Wagner's "Tristan and Isolde" Prelude to act one.
- "Siege" from Act V is inspired by fragments of "Mars" by Gustav Holst and contains a direct quote from it.

== Critical response ==
=== Sales ===
In the United States, Diablo II: Lord of Destruction debuted in first place on NPD Intelect's computer game sales rankings for June 2001. It maintained the position in July and August, but was dropped to #2 by The Sims in September. Following a placement of sixth for October, the game totaled sales in the United States of 576,143 units by the first week of November. At the time, GameSpot's writer Desslock noted that Lord of Destruction had "sold well and continue[s] to do so", and cited its performance as evidence that "there's probably never been a larger demand for RPGs". It fell to 19th place on NPD Intelect's chart for November, and was absent from the top 20 for December. However, Lord of Destruction ultimately became the United States' fourth-best-selling computer game of 2001, with domestic sales of 859,743 units and revenues of $29.2 million.

Lord of Destruction received a "Silver" sales award from the Entertainment and Leisure Software Publishers Association (ELSPA), indicating sales of at least 100,000 copies in the United Kingdom.

By July 26, 2001, global sales of Lord of Destruction had surpassed 1 million units, while more than 2 million units had been shipped. These figures made it the fastest-selling expansion pack ever for a computer game at the time.

=== Reviews and awards ===
Reception

Aggregate score
Aggregator	Score
Metacritic	87/100

Review scores
Publication	Score
Computer Games Magazine	5/5
Computer Gaming World	4.5/5
Game Informer	7.25 out of 10
PC Format	77%
PC Gamer (US)	75%
PC Zone	83/100

Lord of Destruction received "generally favorable" reviews according to review aggregator Metacritic. GameSpot awarded the game an 8.2 out of 10, IGN administered the game an 8.8 out of 10, and GameSpy gave the game an 88 out of 100. The game has also won an award for being in the top 50 most important games of all time according to IGN magazine for its online multiplayer.

Within the Diablo II community the expansion caused some controversy when Blizzard patched the original game with an update that made Nightmare and Hell difficulties particularly harder than before; some players felt that Blizzard was effectively forcing them to upgrade to the expansion in order to find the items and gain the abilities necessary to deal with the new challenges.

During the 5th Annual Interactive Achievement Awards, Lord of Destruction received a nomination for "PC Role-Playing Game of the Year", which was ultimately awarded to Baldur's Gate II: Throne of Bhaal. It was nominated as the year's best expansion pack by Computer Gaming World, GameSpy, GameSpot and RPG Vault, but lost these awards variously to Throne of Bhaal and Command & Conquer: Yuri's Revenge. However, the game won Computer Games Magazine's award in this category. The editors wrote, "Add-on developers take note—the bar has been raised."
