= Runic Games =

Defunct video game studio

- Formerly: Surprise Truck (2008)
- Type: Subsidiary
- Industry: Video games
- Founded: August 11, 2008; 18 years ago
- Founder: Travis Baldree; Max Schaefer; Erich Schaefer; Peter Hu
- Defunct: November 3, 2017
- Fate: Dissolved
- Headquarters: Seattle, Washington, U.S.
- Key people: Max Schaefer (CEO); Travis Baldree (president)
- Products: Torchlight; Torchlight II; Hob
- Parent: Perfect World (2010–2017)
- Website: runicgames.com

Runic Games was an American video game developer based in Seattle. It was formed by former Flagship Studios developers in August 2008. In 2009, the company released Torchlight, a single-player action role-playing game. It was acquired by Perfect World in May 2010. They released a sequel, Torchlight II, in 2012. It was at this time the developers revealed they were no longer pursuing plans to create an MMO in the Torchlight universe.

== History ==
Runic Games was founded on August 11, 2008, by Travis Baldree (Fate designer), Max Schaefer, Erich Schaefer (co-founder of Blizzard North), and Peter Hu. Originally, the company was incorporated with the placeholder name "Surprise Truck", as suggested by Max Schaefer. The naming resulted in the company receiving a multitude of calls asking whether they were available to do truck delivery jobs. Runic Games was formed specifically for the purpose of keeping the team behind the game Mythos together to develop a new action RPG video game as a "spiritual successor" to their previous project. Following the dissolution of Flagship Studios in 2008, all 14 members of the Seattle team that developed Mythos signed onto Runic Games.

Full production on the game started around November 2008, meaning that the game's total development period was approximately 11 months. At the 2009 Game Developers Conference some members of the Runic Games team were present with an early version of its single-player game, at which point it was revealed that the title would be Torchlight. One notable addition to the staff was Matt Uelmen, composer for Blizzard Entertainment's Diablo series. As of mid-2009, the company employed no fewer than 26 people. Gamasutra named Runic Games one of its "Top 5 Developers" of 2009 for the studio's ability to create the "highly-polished" Torchlight in only 11 months. The company was also praised for its responsiveness to its player community, citing one particular incident:

Mere hours after a forum member mentioned that one of the game's camera effects left her unable to play sections of the games due to an uncommon eye condition, a Runic developer patched in a user toggle for the option -- at 8:00 am on a Sunday morning, no less.

— Chris Remo, "Gamasutra's Best Of 2009: Top 5 Developers" Gamasutra

Following the 2009 release of Torchlight, the studio shifted to the production of a sequel Torchlight II. In 2010, Perfect World Entertainment, Inc. bought an $8.4 million majority stake in Runic Games. In March 2014, co-founders Erich Schaefer and Travis Baldree decided to leave Runic and form a new indie studio, Double Damage Games. Max Schaefer left the studio in early 2016; he then founded Echtra Games, which included a number of former Blizzard and Runic developers. In August 2018, Echtra announced Torchlight Frontiers, a shared world game build on the Torchlight IP.

On November 3, 2017, Perfect World announced the closure of Runic Games, along with large layoffs at Motiga. Perfect World said the closure was to reflect its company's focus on games as a service. One set of developers from Runic, including Marsh Lefler, Patrick Blank, Allen Fong, and John Dunbar, along with former Gearbox Software members, established Monster Squad Games and are currently developing a player-versus-environment cooperative game.

== Games ==
=== Torchlight (2009) ===
Runic Games' first product is Torchlight, a single-player action role-playing game published by Perfect World Entertainment, Inc. and Encore, Inc, and released for Windows on October 27, 2009. The fantasy-themed game is set in the fictional town of Torchlight and the expansive caverns and dungeons nearby, which adventurers explore to collect valuable loot and battle hordes of monsters. Following the initial digital distribution release, Encore, Inc published a Windows retail box version in January 2010, a port for Mac OS X was developed by World Domination Industries and released through Steam in May 2010, and it was released for the Xbox 360 via XBLA on March 9, 2011. The game was met with a generally positive critical reception, holding a Metacritic score of 83 based on 57 reviews.

=== Torchlight II (2012) ===
Runic Games announced Torchlight II, a sequel that features multiplayer co-op. The company decided to develop the sequel to "give [the players] what they're asking for" in terms of a multiplayer experience, while serving as an intermediate step toward its planned MMORPG. Torchlight II was released on September 20, 2012.

Though not listed anywhere in its marketing materials, Torchlight II requires a Runic Games account to play in Internet Multiplayer games.

=== Hob (2017) ===
Runic Games announced Hob on August 17, 2015.

"Hob is presented without text or dialogue. Narrative is revealed as players explore and interact with their mysterious planet, and the strange life forms that inhabit it. Hob features smooth controller gameplay, multi-layered puzzles, and striking visuals".

Hob was released on September 26, 2017.
