= Mythos (video game) =

- Developer: Flagship Studios
- Publishers: NA: HanbitSoft; EU: Frogster
- Designer: Travis Baldree
- Platform: Microsoft Windows
- Release: 2011
- Genres: Action RPG, MMORPG
- Mode: Multiplayer

Mythos is a multiplayer role-playing video game that was originally under development by Flagship Studios Seattle, a subdivision of Flagship Studios, a video game company composed largely of ex-Blizzard North employees who were lead producers of the Diablo series. Due to financial issues at Flagship Studios, Flagship Seattle was subsequently dissolved, leaving the intellectual property rights in the hands of the Korean game company HanbitSoft. HanbitSoft's corporate partners will continue to develop Mythos for a planned release in South Korea and North America.

Mythos is similar in style to Diablo, utilizing a similar interface and perspective, extensive map and item randomization, and a high fantasy setting. Its development was led by Travis Baldree, creator of the action RPG FATE, now a co-founder of Runic Games.

== Development history ==
=== Flagship Studios (2006-mid-2008) ===
Originally codenamed "Project Tugboat," the game started as a networking technology test for Flagship Studios' multiplayer game Hellgate: London. By late 2006, the test project had grown into an independent game scheduled for a separate release. Its development was led by Travis Baldree and a newly formed Seattle offshoot of Flagship which remained largely separate from the development of Hellgate. Mythos was built upon the same core engine and technology that Hellgate: London used.

Starting in 2007, the game had been in an ongoing closed beta testing stage, with an open beta expected in mid-2008. However, on 19 July 2008 it was announced that due to continuing financial hardships at Flagship Studios, Mythos would be going on hiatus, and the beta closed shortly thereafter. The company laid off most of its employees, and the development of Mythos was suspended. Almost immediately after Flagship's closing, the entire Flagship Seattle team responsible for Mythos (consisting of 14 people including lead designer Travis Baldree and executive producer Max Schaefer) formed Runic Games and began development of a new game named Torchlight.

=== Hanbitsoft (mid-2008-2014) ===
The intellectual property and game assets of Mythos moved into the ownership of South Korean MMO publisher HanbitSoft. In May 2009, Hanbitsoft released a statement on its Korean-language website revealing that parent company T3 Entertainment and T3's subsidiary Redbana are continuing development of Mythos. Included on the site is a message from a designer identified as "Alboos" who states that they are restructuring Mythos to make it "more suited as an online game." In August 2009, Redbana/T3 launched an English-language Mythos website with a closed beta registration form. On 1 December 2009, Redbana began occasional daily updates via the Mythos "teaser" website. On 1 April 2011, Mythos began sending out closed beta keys, on 12 April 2011, Mythos began the open beta. While the planned release date is 28 April 2011, those who purchased the box version will get a 2-day head-start which will start 26 April 2011.

On 19 October 2011, Frogster announced they would discontinue the game in Europe. Those servers officially closed 27 October 2011.

On 2 February 2012, T3 launched the open beta test for Mythos Global. Mythos Global was operated for less than two years; the servers were shut down 22 January 2014.

=== Single Player Release (2022) ===
Hanbitsoft released Mythos on Steam on September 29, 2022. This version is a single-player RPG, marking a return for the game after its previous iterations as an MMO.

The Steam version of Mythos has not been completely translated, leaving many instances of in-game text, including daily quests, interface language, and skill descriptions for the Storm Hunter class in Korean. Most of the social systems have had their functions removed.
