= Diablo: Hellfire =

1997 video game

Hellfire
- Developer: Synergistic Software
- Publisher: Sierra On-Line
- Designers: Kirt Lemons; Donald Tsang; Peter Watje; Jim Edwards; Mike McMillen
- Programmer: Donald Tsang
- Artist: Kirt Lemons
- Writer: Eve Forward
- Composer: Matt Uelmen
- Series: Diablo
- Platform: Windows
- Release: NA: November 25, 1997; EU: 1998
- Genres: Action role-playing, hack and slash
- Modes: Single-player, multiplayer

Hellfire, often called Diablo: Hellfire, is an expansion pack for the video game Diablo, developed by Synergistic Software, a Sierra division, and published by Sierra On-Line in 1997. Despite the objections of Blizzard Entertainment, the Hellfire expansion was permitted by Davidson & Associates, their parent company at the time. Blizzard North, who was developing the sequel Diablo II, thus imposed numerous restrictions upon Synergistic Software's development of Hellfire.

Hellfire was re-released alongside Diablo in 1998 in a bundle called Diablo + Hellfire. Hellfire was released digitally by Blizzard Entertainment on June 5, 2019 as a free add-on with every purchase of the original Diablo on GOG.com.

== Overview ==
Hellfire is a single-player expansion to Diablo. While there are some multi-player modes that can be unlocked, Hellfire is not playable on Blizzard's online gaming service Battle.net, and its changes do not transfer to online characters. However, the expansion does offer many new features as a single-player game, and also does not interfere with a user's ability to still play Diablo with Blizzard's service. Hellfire integrates into Diablo, and because of its design as an "optional, off-the-beaten-path foray", its dungeons can be avoided entirely.

Hellfire's storyline occurs as an aside to the main story arc of the original game. A sorcerer, while performing a ritual, unknowingly releases the demon Na-Krul unto the town of Tristram, but before it can completely escape, the sorcerer magically seals the doors. The player is later tasked with venturing into Na-Krul's lair and vanquishing it. In order to gain access to the dungeons, the player must speak with Lester the Farmer, who is north of Tristram, near the herd of cows; however, if the player speaks to Lester before reaching a certain point of the main Diablo quest, he will be hesitant to ask them to enter the new dungeons.

The expansion pack adds several enhancements to Diablo, including two new dungeon settings (the Nest and the Crypt), additional quests to undertake, several extra game items (including oils which affect item statistics), runes that can be placed as traps, a new page of spells, new affixes for weapons and armor, new shrines, new mini-boss enemy names, a noticeable boost to Diablo's strength and power, and a number of interface improvements. The Monk was the only character class that Synergistic Software was permitted to add; the Monk class is meant to be proficient with the staff in melee combat, gains defense bonuses from lighter armor (but not heavier armor), and is more effective than other classes fighting barehanded (defying the standard RPG progression where a player character gets more powerful by picking up better equipment). There are also two hidden character classes, the axe-wielding Barbarian and the dual-wielding Bard, which can be played using a file tweak. As unfinished characters left in the game code as easter eggs, they utilize the art of the Warrior and Rogue, respectively, and have no lore.

The rest of the expansion integrates more fully into the main adventure. Objects like oils, new weapons, rings and armor, and runes drop amid other more common kinds of items, and the new spellbooks, including books for two previously existing spells that did not have books, and scrolls are found in the same kinds of places. New shrines are found where shrines would normally be found. Hellfire's dungeons are populated with new enemies that do not appear in the main Diablo quest, while the difficulty of Hellfire dungeon floors 1–8 mirror those of levels 9–16 of the main Diablo quest, requiring experienced characters to explore.

Some of the newer convenience features include the option to move more quickly around town using the "jog" toggle found in the options menu; a spell that highlights objects lying on the floor as though the cursor was placed over them; and a spell that teleports the player to the nearest staircase found on that level of the dungeon. These were approved by Blizzard North and some would be adopted for Diablo II.

== Creative interference from sister companies ==
Blizzard, Condor (which by this time had been renamed Blizzard North), and Synergistic Software had all been purchased by the same parent company, Comp-U-Card International. CUC made no effort to ensure that its subsidiaries cooperated in the development of the expansion. Blizzard, which developed and operated the Battle.net service, refused to support Hellfire because they did not want to be blamed for any unforeseen interactions between Battle.net and any code that they had not written themselves. Meanwhile, no content could be added to Hellfire without the approval of Condor/Blizzard North, which was developing Diablo II at the time. Blizzard North vetoed an enormous amount of proposed Hellfire content that would have also been in Diablo II, most notably the Barbarian class, because they wanted this content to be truly "new" when Diablo II launched. This resulted in a lot of frustration among Synergistic employees and a weaker expansion than Synergistic was willing and able to deliver.

== Reception ==
Reception

Review scores
Publication	Score
PC Games	A−
Computer Games Strategy Plus	3/5

Hellfire was a finalist for Computer Gaming World's 1998 "Best Add-On" award, which ultimately went to StarCraft: Brood War.
