= Torchlight, Kentucky =

Unincorporated community in Kentucky, United States

- Unincorporated community
- Location in Kentucky Location in the United States
- Coordinates: 38°2′58″N 82°36′53″W
- Country: United States
- State: Kentucky
- County: Lawrence
- Elevation: 640 ft (200 m)
- Time zone: UTC-5 (Eastern (EST))
  - Summer (DST): UTC-4 (EDT)
- GNIS feature ID: 509222

Torchlight is an unincorporated community and coal town in Lawrence County, Kentucky, United States. The community is named for an annual torchlight parade accident which resulted in the Hotel Greenup being burned to the ground.
