= Rebel Galaxy =

2015 video game

- Developer: Double Damage Games
- Publisher: Double Damage Games
- Engine: OGRE
- Platforms: Microsoft Windows; OS X; PlayStation 4; Xbox One
- Release: Microsoft Windows, OS X; October 20, 2015; PlayStation 4; January 5, 2016; Xbox One; January 13, 2016
- Genre: Space flight simulator
- Mode: Single-player

Rebel Galaxy is a space trading and combat simulation game developed and published by Double Damage Games. It was released for Microsoft Windows and OS X on October 20, 2015. Xbox One and PlayStation 4 versions were released in January 2016.

A prequel to the game, Rebel Galaxy Outlaw, was released for Microsoft Windows on 13 August 2019 and later for the Nintendo Switch, PlayStation 4, Xbox One on 22 September 2020.

== Gameplay ==
The game features space combat in capital ships in a randomly generated universe. While non-player fighter craft and gunships are capable of three-dimensional maneuvering, the player and other capital ships are restricted to a two-dimensional plane of movement with combat focusing on using broadsides to attack and defeat enemy ships. Similar to earlier space flight simulator games such as Freelancer, players are free to pursue various activities, such as pirating, trading, or bounty hunting, in addition to completing story missions to advance the plot.

== Soundtrack ==
Rebel Galaxy uses licensed blues rock and country rock tracks from artists including Blues Saraceno, Nick Nolan, The Blue News, and Abbas Premjee.

== Reception ==
Reception

Aggregate score
Aggregator	Score
Metacritic	PC: 75/100; PS4: 64/100; XONE: 76/100

Review scores
Publication	Score
Destructoid	PS4: 6.5/10
IGN	PC: 8.0/10
PC Gamer (US)	PC: 70/100

Rebel Galaxy has received generally favorable reviews, according to review aggregation website Metacritic based on 28 reviews.
