= Fate (video game) =

2005 video game

- Developers: WildStudios, WildTangent
- Publishers: WildTangent; Encore Software
- Designer: Travis Baldree
- Series: Fate
- Platforms: Microsoft Windows, Mac OS X
- Release: Windows: NA: May 18, 2005; Mac OS X September 19, 2008
- Genre: Action role-playing
- Mode: Single-player

Fate is a 2005 action role-playing game originally released for the PC by WildTangent. It was remastered and included in the Fate: Reawakened collection released to Nintendo Switch, PlayStation 5, Windows and Xbox Series X/S on March 12, 2025.

== Gameplay ==
Fate is a fantasy action role-playing game. This type of game is also known as a dungeon crawler, in which the player takes their character through progressively difficult levels of a dungeon, fighting monsters, completing quests, collecting valuable items and gold, and improving the character's attributes and skills along the way. The dungeon in Fate has a randomized layout for each level; treasures found within each level are randomized, as are the number and type of monsters. Fate is rendered fully in 3D, allowing the player to zoom in and out of the action as necessary; however, the camera can only be rotated selectively.

There appears to be an effectively indefinite number of levels to the dungeon, although in reality this is capped at 2,147,483,647 (2^{31} – 1), which is the highest number representable by a signed 32-bit integer.

The player is accompanied by a pet, which can initially be chosen as a dog (specifically, a terrier) or a cat. This pet fights on behalf of the player, can carry items, and can be sent back to town in order to sell unwanted findings (though it cannot collect rewards for fetch quests). If the pet's Health Points are driven down to zero (due to blows or damaging spells from enemies) it does not die, but merely flees the fight. Hence, the game's introduction describes the pet as invincible since it cannot be killed. It will still follow the character, but it will not fight until it regains some health. To fully heal their pet, the player can send it back to town, feed it healing potions or charms, or make it drink from a health fountain. The player can also transform the pet into various (and more powerful) creatures by feeding it fish, which can be caught in fishing holes found throughout the game or purchased from vendors. The time of the transformation depends on the 'size' of the fish, but a flawless fish makes the transformation permanent until the pet is fed a different fish. A "Dogfish" will make the pet return to its original form.

It is also possible to get rare items from fish. A patient player who takes time to fish can make their character very wealthy and obtain top-notch gear. There is a fishing hole in the town; by selling fish that the player catches, the player can get money for purchasing better gear before braving the dungeon. The deeper the character is in the dungeon, the better items and more powerful pet transformations they can find while angling.

Screenshot showing spell effects in Fate

=== Player characters ===
When the character gains enough experience points, they are promoted to the next character level and given five Attribute points as well as one Skill point. Increasing the four attributes (Strength, Dexterity, Vitality and Magic) allow the character to wield stronger weapons, armor and magical spells, while Skills denote proficiency at certain things (Sword Skill, Charm Magic Skill, Critical Strike Skill, etc.—there are a total of 15 different Skills). There are no set character classes in Fate, allowing maximum customization. Additionally, the player is rewarded with Fame points for completing side-quests and defeating enemy bosses, which contribute to the gaining of Fame levels. Four Skill Points are awarded for gaining a Fame level. Elite and Legendary items cannot be used until the player is at a certain Fame level. Certain items (i.e., weapons, armor, and jewelry) contain sockets, into which the player can put special gems in order to customize the item. Having sockets does not create higher requirements for using an item, although they make the item more valuable. Finally, a denizen of Grove, specifically a minstrel, can be paid to increase the character's Fame, "allowing savvy players to buy Skill points."

=== Non-player characters and quests ===
Several townspeople of Grove offer randomized side-quests to the player. These are sometimes called fetch quests (retrieving a valuable item from the dungeon), though they often require the player to kill off all enemies of a certain type on a certain level of the dungeon or dispatch an enemy boss. Upon completion of a side-quest, the player can return to the townsperson who gave it to them, and receive a reward of Fame Points, Experience Points and gold.

Sometimes a valuable item is also given as part of the reward for completing a side-quest. In the case of a fetch quest, players can always decide if they want to keep the item they were sent to retrieve or if the potential rewards for turning it in to the quest giver are more important. To keep an item from a fetch quest, the player must cancel the quest in the quest book.

Other non-player townspeople include vendors, who sell arms, armor, potions, etc.

In addition to the various vendors and quest givers in the town, there is also a Healer, who will bring the character's and his/her pet's Health Points up to full capacity free of charge, and an Enchanter who, for a fee, will try (sometimes unsuccessfully) to add an enchantment or a socket to an item of the player's choosing. However, once in a while, he will accidentally delete all of the item's enchantments or even put a curse on the item, reducing its usefulness.

Sometimes a vendor will appear in the dungeon. Vendors have neutral status in the game, so enemies will not attack them. The player's character cannot be attacked by enemies while engaged in buying or selling with a vendor. Vendors who appear in the dungeon are Pikko the Fisherman (who will sell fish and fishing poles) and Getts the Traveler (who will sell miscellaneous items).

=== Death ===
If at any point in the game the character dies (Health Points driven down to zero) the death is not permanent. The personification of Fate appears, who resembles the Grim Reaper. Fate offers the player three choices: first, the character can be brought back to life at the spot where they fell, in exchange for a portion of their Experience Points and Fame Points. Second, they can be brought back to life and transported to a nearby level (one or two levels up or down) in exchange for 1/10th of their gold. Third, they can be brought back to life and transported 3 levels upwards, with all their gold being dropped where the character fell, at which point a countdown begins. As a game mechanic, if the character stays out of a previously visited dungeon level for 20 minutes on the game clock, the level will be automatically refreshed with all new monsters and treasure, although the dungeon layout stays the same. Therefore, if a character dies on that level and does not make it back within 20 minutes, any gold they left there when they died will be gone permanently. The 20-minute rule does not apply if the character has a portal to that level, since one end of the portal is constantly occupying the level. However, if the character has died and been transported three levels up, there will be no portal. If none of these three options is to the player's liking, they may choose Quit and the character is effectively transported back in time to the last occasion the game loaded. However, the death is still recorded in the character's journal.

=== Retirement ===
If the player completes the main quest they received at the beginning of the game, they are given the option to retire the current character and start play over again with a descendant of the first character. The descendant gets various perks and bonuses, including one item that is handed down from its ancestor. If this family heirloom has any magical enchantments on it, they will be augmented by 25% every time the item is passed down. If a weapon or piece of armor is passed down, its damage done or defensive capabilities will be increased as well. If a player chooses not to retire, they can advance their characters and go as deep into the dungeon as they like, with the last level being 2,147,483,647, that being the highest number that can be represented by a signed 32-bit integer.

== Plot ==
The game starts in the town of Grove, where on the outskirts of town the ancient Dungeon Gate leads would-be adventurers to multiple levels of fame, fortune, and death. The player assumes the role of one of these adventurers, and is assigned a randomized quest at the beginning of the game that will take them to approximately the 40th–50th level of the dungeon. Along the way, randomized side-quests are made available to the player by the townspeople of Grove. Eventually, the player completes the primary quest by defeating the randomized boss monster.

== Development ==
Designer and programmer Travis Baldree intended Fate to combine elements from games like Diablo and NetHack and make them accessible to a casual gaming audience, while also maintaining a level of appeal to hardcore gamers. He eschewed a grim and gritty style, in favor of a more inviting atmosphere. Although Baldree had considered the idea for several years, production of the game began in October 2004, with a total development time of about five months.

Fate offers no multiplayer elements. Multiplayer was considered, but the developers could not add it because of the game's extremely short development time.

Based on his work on Fate, Baldree was hired by Flagship Studios. By 2006 he headed a Seattle-based offshoot of the studio, developing Mythos, an online action role-playing game, with a group that included several members of the Fate team. He went on to co-found Runic Games with Max Schaefer and Erich Schaefer, two of the creators of Diablo.

=== Music ===
The score for the in-game town of Grove takes from Western classical guitar and Middle Eastern influences much as the Diablo series does. This part of the soundtrack follows a traditional Irish theme, and includes "Captain O'Kane" and "The Clergy's Lamentation" by famed Irish composer Turlough O'Carolan. Other notable tracks with Celtic influence include "Good Morning to Your Nightcap" and "Behind the Haystack". "Captain O'Kane" and "The Clergy's Lamentation" are recordings by Ensemble Galilei available on the album Music in the Great Hall: Instrumental Music from the Ancient Celtic Lands, another version of "The Clergy's Lamentation" is performed by harpist Sue Richards taken from the album Grey Eyed Morn, "Good Morning to Your Nightcap" and "Behind the Haystack" are from Karen Ashbrook's album Hills of Erin.

The serene music of Grove is contrasted by a mixture of junglelike woodwinds, frantic percussion, and ominous ambient effects heard in the game's dungeon. This portion of the soundtrack is original in composition and credited to sound engineer Marc Pospisil and developer Travis Baldree.

=== Narration ===
Actor Henry Dardenne is the game's narrator. He narrates the introduction sequence that details the plot of the game, as well as a variety of notifications during gameplay.

== Merchandising ==
In December 2021, the owners of the Fate franchise's Facebook and Twitter accounts utilized reaction polls to determine which Fate character the community favored most. The most voted upon was Fate personified as shown on the game’s cover, and a limited edition plush of this character was later released by WildTangent as merchandise on July 15, 2022. This was announced on the Steam page for the game, and the plush was successfully funded via a Makeship crowdfunding campaign.

A second Makeship crowdfunding campaign launched in 2025 to coincide with the release of FATE: Reawakened, this time for a plushie of the series’ Brain Beast.

== Reception ==
Reception

Aggregate scores
Aggregator	Score
GameRankings	80% (11 reviews)
Metacritic	80/100 (9 reviews)

Review scores
Publication	Score
GameSpot	7.9/10
GameSpy	4.5/5

Fate was positively received by critics, garnering an average review score of 80% at GameRankings and a score of 80/100 at Metacritic.

Greg Kasavin of GameSpot called it "a high-quality game that delivers well on a concept that isn't ambitious but is well known for being fun and addictive," while pointing out its strong resemblance to Blizzard Entertainment's Diablo. Writing for GameSpy, William Abner praised the game as "elegantly designed" and singled out the charm and personality of the game's graphics and pet animations. Both reviewers cited Fate's low price as a selling point but criticized its lack of multiplayer features.

The editors of Computer Games Magazine presented Fate with their 2005 "Best Role-Playing Game" award. It was a runner-up for their list of the year's top 10 computer games. Fate was also a finalist for PC Gamer US's "Best Roleplaying Game 2005" and "Best Value 2005" awards, which ultimately went to Dungeon Siege II and Guild Wars, respectively.

== Sequels ==
A sequel/expansion to the original game, Fate: Undiscovered Realms, followed in the summer of 2008, and another two sequels—titled Fate: The Traitor Soul and Fate: The Cursed King—were released in 2009 and 2011, respectively.
