= Hob (video game) =

2017 action-adventure video game

- Developer: Runic Games (Note: Ported to Switch by Panic Button.)
- Publisher: Runic Games (Note: Currently published by Arc Games.)
- Composer: Matt Uelmen
- Engine: OGRE
- Platforms: Microsoft Windows; PlayStation 4 Nintendo Switch
- Release: Windows, PlayStation 4 September 26, 2017; Nintendo Switch; April 17, 2019
- Genre: Action-adventure
- Mode: Single-player

Hob is an action-adventure game developed and published by Runic Games. It was originally released for Microsoft Windows and PlayStation 4 on September 26, 2017. An enhanced port developed by Panic Button was released in 2019 for the Nintendo Switch. It is the last game developed by Runic Games before their dissolution. It is set in a science-fiction world filled with bizarre wildlife, over-grown architecture, and arcane machinery.

== Gameplay ==
Hob's gameplay centers around two main components: exploration and combat.

=== Exploration ===
When the game starts, the player is only able to access a small area. As the game progresses, the player solves puzzles and unlocks powers that open up more areas of the map.

=== Combat ===
The core of Hob's simple combat system is made up of four main actions: quick sword attack, slow punch attack, slower charge attack, and roll. Throughout the game the player can unlock more advanced combat maneuvers, such as a ground-slam attack and a deployable shield. Many of these maneuvers use up energy, which recharges at a slow rate. The player can also find items throughout the world that increase their default damage, maximum health, and maximum energy.

== Plot ==
The story line of Hob is expressed through environmental storytelling, with more and more clues being revealed as the game goes on. Since there is no dialogue or written language, these clues are given through the environments, enemies, and other creatures that the player interacts with.

The story of the world can be worked out from the 5 'lore rooms' present in the game, as well as the game's own prequel comic on the Runic Games website. The lore rooms in sequence show, in symbolic animated glyph forms:

1. A sun dying around a planet and a spaceship holding 4 elders and 20 disciples.

2. The spaceship departs that solar system before the sun dies and lands on a new world with an active sun.

3. Using the sun's power, the spaceship builds the raised platforms and the high tower present in the game.

4. Then, a new spaceship shows up and transmits a virus or infection to one of the elders in the high tower, who then spreads it to the rest of the platform structures (the infection is represented by the 'spikes' shown in the symbols). This is accompanied by a sound, 'woahlah', which the queen at the end of the game also makes. The appearance of the spikes is accompanied by chittering, creeping sounds.

5. Lastly, as a result of the infection spreading, the robots awaken. This lore-room contains one of the four elders, dead, suggesting that it was them that made the glyphs.

The prequel comic then shows a robot awakening, to be transported to the surface of one of the platforms, where it sees many robots fighting the infection and being killed. It pops a blade out of its wrist, but is then stabbed by one of the infection plants. It retreats from combat and one of the 'sprites' in the game then heals it, causing greenery to grow from its wound. It then seeks out and opens one of the disciple chambers, releasing a character of the same species as the main character. This particular disciple has a pair of horn-like stubs on the top of its head. Unfortunately it is attacked and infected by a plant, develops blight-like growths on one side of its face, and is encased in a rainbow crystalline formation before it can do anything more. As the crystalline structure starts to break apart, the robot leaves and opens more disciple chambers. Many chambers are opened and it is assumed they have all failed to stop the infection. The last chamber it opens is the main character's, Hob.

Throughout the course of the actual game, Hob will find many deceased disciples, who they obtain sword components from. They will also come across some of the rainbow crystal formations, which are always accompanied by a butterfly, suggesting that the crystals are chrysalises from which the butterflies have emerged. And they will be helped at points by the infected disciple shown in the prequel, who has become half-infection, half-disciple, with fungi-like horns emerging from where their head stubs were, a ragged coat and only one half of their face still unaffected by the infection.

At the end of the game, Hob finds enough power cores to awaken one of the larger robots, which creates a bridge to reach the High Tower. Hob climbs the high tower, where they find the remaining three elders and the infected disciple. Two of the three elders are alive and uninfected, but incapacitated by the infection's plants, while the third is infected and enclosed by it. Hob stumbles upon a spore pod when realizing the elders are alive, and starts becoming infected. The infected 'queen' awakens, and uses her power to draw the infection from Hob. She gestures to herself and makes the sound 'woahlah', indicating a name. She then explains through gestures that the infection is not her, that it came from above and into her, and through her, to the planet. But she shows the beauty that it is capable of creating by showing the butterflies which the chrysalises have developed. She then offers Hob the choice of either joining her and the infection in co-existing on the planet, or siding with the other elders and destroying the infection.

If Hob chooses the Queen, the world becomes covered with the rainbow crystalline structures, suggesting that more of it is being converted into symbiosis. The robot is shown post-credits opening yet another disciple chamber to try and stop the infection.

If Hob chooses the Elders, it fights the infected disciple. When Hob kills the disciple the Queen accepts her fate and offers herself to be destroyed. Hob then takes her place on the throne as an elder. This destroys the infection across the planet, and the world is shown clean, with the disciples emerging from their chambers and being reunited. Post-credits the robot is shown finally going to sleep, accompanied by the sprites.

== Development and release ==
Hob was developed by Runic Games. The game was announced in August 2015 at PAX Prime. Matt Uelmen composed the soundtrack for the game. The game was released on PlayStation 4 and Windows in 2017. This would be the final title to be developed by Runic Games, as the company closed following the release of the title.

An enhanced version titled Hob: The Definitive Edition, developed by Panic Button, was released by Perfect World Entertainment for the Nintendo Switch on April 17, 2019. After the publisher's sale to Embracer Group, the game is currently published by Gearbox Publishing.

== Reception and reviews ==
Reception

Aggregate score
Aggregator	Score
Metacritic	PC: 76/100; PS4: 79/100; NS: 76/100

Review scores
Publication	Score
Destructoid	5/10
Eurogamer	Recommended
Game Informer	8/10
IGN	7.8/10
Nintendo Life	8/10
Nintendo World Report	7/10
PC Gamer (US)	77/100

Hob received "generally favorable" reviews from critics according to review aggregator Metacritic.

Game Informer previewed it positively, stating, "From the archaic machines dotting the landscape, to the bizarre creatures and even the mysteries surrounding the main character, Hob's narrative strength lies in showing rather than telling...I walked away from this demo impressed".

PC Gamer gave it a score of 77/100, saying in their verdict, it was "a gorgeous world eager to be explored with satisfying puzzles and fun, if occasionally clumsy, action".

IGN said overall the game is a "beautiful Zelda-like puzzler with fun combat elements that takes place on an enchanting world where nature and machinery alter the landscape as easily as a twist of a Rubik's cube. The wordless approach to the story creates some confusion and the fix camera sometimes results in unnecessary deaths, but never does the time spent with Hob feel wasted".
