= Hellgate: London =

2007 video game

- Developer: Flagship Studios (Note: Massive Black, Liquid Development and Shanghai ArtCoding are working on the game after its original release, developing local free-to-play versions.)
- Publisher: Namco Bandai Games; Electronic Arts: WW: HanbitSoft (re-release)
- Producers: Bill Roper; Kenneth Williams
- Designers: Erich Schaefer; David Brevik
- Programmers: Tyler Thompson; Peter Hu; David Brevik
- Artists: Phil Shenk; David Glenn
- Writer: Ivan Sulic
- Composers: Sonic Mayhem; Cris Velasco
- Platform: Microsoft Windows
- Release: NA: October 31, 2007; EU: November 2, 2007^{ASEAN} October 31, 2007: AU: November 1, 2007^{ROK} February 22, 2008
- Genre: Action role-playing game
- Modes: Single-player, multiplayer

Hellgate: London is a dark fantasy themed action role-playing game originally developed by Flagship Studios, released on October 31, 2007. It was developed by a team led by former Blizzard Entertainment employees, some of whom had overseen the creation of the Diablo series. The original release of the game was co-published by Namco Bandai Games and Electronic Arts.

Set in a post-apocalyptic London in the year 2038, Hellgate: London is a fast-paced action role-playing hack and slash game. It includes random elements from roguelikes such as weapon and armor attributes, item drops, mob spawns, and level composition. The game featured both single-player and online multiplayer support when it was released, although North American and European online support has been discontinued. The single-player version features a five-act story questline. When completed, the player is eligible to restart the storyline again in a higher difficulty and create new characters in an elite mode.

In 2008, Flagship Studios filed for bankruptcy. All intellectual property was seized as collateral for funding received from Comerica Bank. Subsequently, development of the game halted. Namco Bandai Games provided free ongoing North American and European server support until January 31, 2009, when the multiplayer game servers and websites were taken offline. HanbitSoft has since acquired rights to the game and has redeveloped it as the free-to-play Hellgate London: Resurrection in South Korea, featuring Seoul-based maps. In 2014, Hellgate Global was announced, adding Tokyo to the game for a possible release outside South Korea. During development, a port for the Xbox 360 was considered but was never released.

== Gameplay ==
Hellgate: London is an action role-playing game that builds upon the core design of roguelikes by using random generation of maps, monsters, and loot to allow for replayability. The game can be played in either third person perspective or first person perspective.

Hellgate: London can be played offline or online without a fee. Players can pay a monthly fee to gain additional content over time, including new areas, weapons, monsters, classes, quests, events, titles, game modes, and other content. The game consists of six acts to unify the areas a player travels through on a greater scale. All acts account for approximately 25–40 hours of single-player gameplay.

Hellgate: London was initially designed to be primarily focused on solo and cooperative PvE combat, but players can duel and there is a free-for-all PvP mode for subscribers. Dueling can only take place outside of Underground hubs. Players can also choose to enter into PvP mode, which means they can be attacked and harmed outside of Underground hubs by anyone else that has chosen to enter PvP mode. The game does not feature LAN support.

The game world of Hellgate: London is a set of demon-infested dungeons and city streets, featuring safe zones such as disused London Underground stations. The safe zones scattered across the world act as havens, where players can purchase and upgrade items at NPC merchants, interact with other players in the game world, and commence or complete quests. The journey between zones is randomly generated; levels are fully 3D, rendered with the game's own proprietary graphics engine. Included in these environments are randomly generated enemies, bosses, and items. The game features historical London areas and buildings, such as St Paul's Cathedral and Big Ben.

The Hellgate: London setting has six classes to choose from. These are paired up into three main archetypes, referred to as Factions in game. The factions are split as follows:

- Templars, the fighter faction, are of an order of divine warriors who wish to preserve humanity and smite the Great Dark that has fallen upon the world. Their two classes are Guardians and Blademasters.
- Cabalists, the mage faction, are seekers of knowledge who want to control the fate of mankind by studying the Great Dark and using their powers. Their classes are Summoners and Evokers.
- Hunters, the ranged faction, are highly trained ex-military operatives who have been through almost every warlike scenario imaginable. Marksmen and Engineers are their classes.

Melee classes are limited to a third-person view, whereas ranged classes default to a first-person view but can switch to a third-person view if desired. Precision aiming is not required to use most weapons, which track their targets, lock on, or carpet an area with explosives. The game contains sniper rifles and other weapons that require accurate manual aiming, though most are exclusive to the Hunter faction.

Players may choose the character's name and various visual physical attributes. Depending on whether they're playing single-player or multiplayer, several different difficulty settings will be available to players when creating new characters. A character is permanently locked to the chosen mode. Normal mode is the default difficulty setting. Elite mode is designed to be harder than normal difficulty with several adjustments to game mechanics. Enemies are stronger and deal more damage, and rarer mobs are more likely to spawn. Augments are also more expensive, and merchants pay less for goods. Hardcore mode is played in either Normal or Elite difficulty and adds permadeath as a consequence for dying.

Hellgate: London uses a heavily randomized item system featuring a large variety of base weapon types and armor types, with a pool of random properties and bonuses (magical affixes) applied to them to promote replayability and item collection. Furthermore, unwanted weapons and armor can be freely disassembled to save space in one's inventory, often yielding crafting materials that can be exchanged for new weapons or used to upgrade existing ones. Items may have slots that a player can insert mods in to further enhance their power.

The single-player version of Hellgate: London hosts a five-act story questline. Elite characters can be created once a character has completed the story quest line once. The storyline can be repeated in Nightmare difficulty, where enemies start at level 30. A character's experience is capped at 50 levels, while enemies in Nightmare difficulty can reach level 62.

== Flagship Studios ==
Flagship Studios
- Type: Private
- Industry: Video games
- Founded: 2003
- Defunct: August 2008
- Fate: Dissolved
- Headquarters: San Francisco, California, United States
- Key people: Bill Roper (CEO and co-founder); Max Schaefer (COO and co-founder); Kenneth Williams (CFO and co-founder)
- Products: Hellgate: London; Mythos

Flagship Studios was an American video game developer best known for creating Hellgate: London. It was founded by Bill Roper along with Max Schaefer, Erich Schaefer, and David Brevik, former Blizzard North executives. The latter three had been collaborating since their 1993 founding of Condor Studios, later renamed upon acquisition by Blizzard Entertainment. At Blizzard North, the Schaefers and Brevik created the Diablo franchise, while Roper oversaw development of the Warcraft and StarCraft series.

Flagship Studios had a partnership with Namco Hometek and HanbitSoft to cover an international market for game marketing and distribution. The company dissolved in August 2008 because of financial troubles.

Mythos was a game under development by a division of Flagship Studios commonly called "Flagship Seattle". An online RPG, similar in style to Diablo, the game was used to test the networking technology behind the multiplayer component of Hellgate: London. It was expected to be free to play and download, although the financing model was never set in stone. Following the layoffs at Flagship Studios due to the financial issues, the intellectual property rights over Mythos have now been claimed by the Korean company Hanbitsoft, which was offered as collateral for loans earlier in the year. Mythos lead designer Travis Baldree and Flagship Studios co-founder Max Schaefer have subsequently formed the new game company Runic Games along with the remaining staff of 14 behind the game from Flagship Seattle. Runic Games developed the Diablo-like action RPG Torchlight. They have since left Runic to found Double Damage Games.

=== Founding ===
In June 2003, Blizzard North executives Bill Roper, Max Schaefer, Erich Schaefer, and David Brevik emailed Blizzard Entertainment's then-parent company, Vivendi Games, threatening to resign unless provided financial protections and communication on Vivendi's intent to sell Blizzard. Vivendi accepted their resignations effective immediately, spurring them to found Flagship Studios and recruit similarly disgruntled Blizzard North employees.

=== Closure ===
On August 15, 2008, co-founder Max Schaefer announced that the studio had shut down. Max and Erich Schaefer then formed Runic Games, which dissolved in November 2017.

== History ==
In March 2005, following months of teasing concept art for an unknown game, Flagship Studios' first title named Hellgate: London was announced via an exclusive article in the computer magazine PC Gamer. It was formally released October 31, 2007 as an action role-playing game (RPG) in the same vein as the Diablo games, but with the twist of being played in 3D, primarily from a first-person perspective. The game takes place in a post-apocalyptic demon-infested London, following a great battle between demons and humans. Unlike regular first-person shooters, the game features RPG content in the form of e.g. random quests, and where a character's combat efficiency is more determined by statistics than player reflexes. In addition, the game features random levels, uncommon in games of similar perspective and scale. The game received mixed reviews, and complaints by many gamers that the game was released in an unfinished state, which was later admitted by CEO Bill Roper. The company no longer owns the intellectual property rights to the game.

=== Original release ===
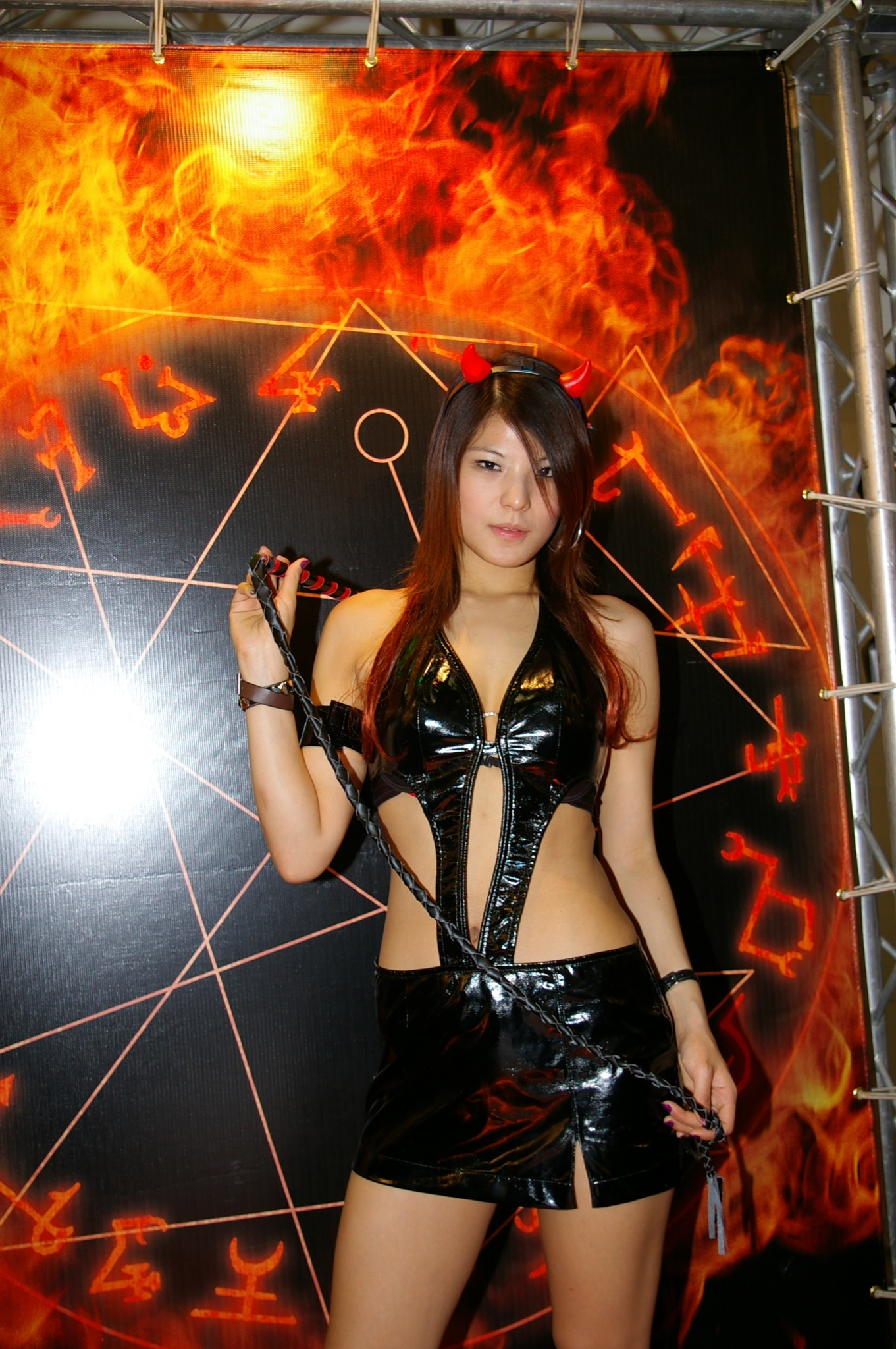
Promotion at Taipei Game Show 2008

The developer Flagship Studios had proposed regular additions to Hellgate: London throughout the life of the game. In March 2008, it was announced that Comerica Bank would provide game funding assistance, using Hellgate: London as collateral, for Flagship Studios so that they would not "rely upon a publisher's investment" to support ongoing development of their games. "The Stonehenge Chronicles" update was scheduled for release on January 21, 2008 but was postponed until January 22, 2008 due to bugs. The last content patch developed by Flagship Studios was the "Abyss Chronicles". The original servers were shut down on February 1, 2009.

The company Ping0 managed the North American and European servers for Hellgate: London, while Infocomm Asian Holdings managed the Southeast Asia server. Players in the Southeast Asia region experienced server crashing issues. The publishing companies involved gave an official response after several requests from the community. Following the shutdown of Flagship Studios in August 2008 and the loss of its intellectual property rights, it was announced that Hellgate: London game servers would be shut down as of January 31, 2009. At 12:00 a.m. CST on February 1, 2009, the game server and website for the North American and European regions became inaccessible.

The following is an account of the North American and European subscription model Flagship Studios had while it was in effect: There were two types of multiplayer accounts: free and subscription accounts. Subscribers had access to ongoing content updates. The US subscription plan cost $9.95 a month and an offer to pay a one-time fee of $149.99 for a lifetime subscription was available for up to 100,000 people who pre-ordered the game and ended on January 31, 2008. The UK subscription is £6.99 and EU subscription is €9.99. Additionally, subscribers would have access to a Hardcore mode, special PvP arenas and a PvP ladder, the ability to bypass server queues, a shared storage space with room for 40 items instead of 20, the ability to create guilds, the ability to achieve officer status in guilds, and 24-hour customer support. Subscribers and non-subscribers were able to interact in all ways in the game. Non-subscribers could join guilds, but not create them. The level cap is set to 50 and up to 24 character slots are available for all players. As of July 2008, all subscriptions were suspended and players could neither subscribe nor unsubscribe at that point, although they were no longer billed. Since Flagship Studios went into receivership, the US & EU multiplayer ceased.

Due to problems with the subscription service, the Halloween holiday subscription content was made available to all players, both fee-paying and free-playing. In SEA, two weeks after the game was released, many players complained about a game patch, installed by Infocomm Asia Holdings (IAH), which supposedly would have deleted player's characters since game launch. While the EU and US servers had received recent patches and additional content since launch, support and patching of the SEA server had been delayed. IAHGames, the distributor of Hellgate: London and the company providing the "Alliance" server for the SEA region, had promised patch 0 on launch day itself. However, Patch 0 was delayed with no official date of implementation. On November 14, a joint statement by the CEOs of IAHGames and Flagship Studios announced that the both Patch 0 and Patch 0.1 will be implemented on November 22 and that they are considering some compensation for the early adopters.

=== Relaunches ===
On November 3, 2008, South Korean-based software distributor Hanbitsoft announced via its global public relations blog, that it has acquired the Hellgate: London and Mythos properties from Flagship Studios. The post mentions development of an upcoming expansion, using leftover Flagship development efforts. Updates from company state the expansion pack includes new maps featuring Seoul and a product title, The Second Invasion. On November 12, 2009, HanbitSoft announced the re-development of Hellgate: London (authorized by the former Flagship Studio) had been completed. By July 2011, Hellgate: London multiplayer servers were relaunched using a free-to-play model. Hanbitsoft's redesigned game is live in South Korea, while the North American release has been only in beta testing.

In September 2014, Hellgate Global, which was announced to include the expansion Hellgate: Tokyo and the new Hell Mode difficulty level, was listed at Steam Greenlight by HanbitSoft-linked company Redbana Corporation. The project was approved by the Steam Community and Valve contacted Redbana Corporation for the possibility of hosting the game on Steam. However, in January 2016 the T3Fun/Redbana Hellgate Global service was shut down.

On November 15, 2018, Hellgate: London was released on Steam, developed by T3 Entertainment and published by HanbitSoft.

== Reception ==
Reception

Aggregate score
Aggregator	Score
Metacritic	70/100

Review scores
Publication	Score
1Up.com	D+
Eurogamer	7/10
GamePro	60%
GameSpot	7/10
GameSpy	3/5
IGN	6.8/10
Bit-tech	7/10
GameDaily	7/10

The game received "mixed or average" reviews, according to review aggregator Metacritic. The game sold almost one million copies.

Positive aspects of the game commented on by reviewers include its story, and the overall look of the game. Other aspects of the game received mixed reception. For instance, some reviewers called the combat enjoyable, with varied classes, and praised the loot and customisation aspects, while other reviewers described combat as underdeveloped and monotonous, with quest repetition and locked progression choices. Similarly, the game's technology received mixed reviews. The multiplayer component was both praised and criticised, with some bugs, slowdowns and crashes mentioned.

== Other media ==
=== Comic ===
A comic book adaptation of Hellgate: London was written by Ian Edginton, illustrated by Steve Pugh, and published by Dark Horse Comics. All four issues were collected into a trade paperback published in June 2007 (ISBN 1-59307-681-9). The collected comic was also included in the Collector's Edition of the game. The plot focuses on a Templar, Cabalist and Hunter teaming together to rescue a book they believe will give them an advantage over the demons.

=== Novels ===
There is also a trilogy of novels based on Hellgate: London written by Mel Odom. The first novel, titled Exodus was released on June 26, 2007; the second novel, Goetia, was released on February 26, 2008; the third novel, Covenant was released on August 26, 2008. Exodus is set 18 years before events of the game, Goetia takes place 14 years before the events of the game, and Covenant takes place 13 years before the events of the game. The novels primarily follow the stories of three characters and their interactions with each other, as well as their individual struggles against the demons. Each character is from a different class from the game. The novels also feature references to and cameos by various characters from the game.

== Hellgate VR ==
Hellgate VR is being developed by Skonec Entertainment.

== Hellgate: Redemption ==
A new game set in the Hellgate: London universe, codenamed Hellgate: Redemption, is being developed by Lunacy Games.
