= Diablo IV: Lord of Hatred =

- Developers: Blizzard Team 3; Blizzard Albany
- Publisher: Blizzard Entertainment
- Directors: Brent Gibson; Zaven Haroutunian
- Composers: Ted Reedy, Ryan Amon
- Series: Diablo
- Platforms: PlayStation 4; PlayStation 5; Windows; Xbox One; Xbox Series X/S; Nintendo Switch 2
- Release: PS5, Windows, Xbox Series X/S; April 28, 2026; Nintendo Switch 2; September 15, 2026
- Genres: Action role-playing, hack and slash, dungeon crawler
- Mode: Multiplayer

Diablo IV: Lord of Hatred is a major expansion pack for the action role-playing dungeon crawling game Diablo IV, developed and published by Blizzard Entertainment. It is the second major expansion for the game, following Vessel of Hatred. It was released on April 28, 2026, for the PlayStation 4, PlayStation 5, Xbox One, Xbox Series X and S, and Windows. The Nintendo Switch 2 version released on September 15, 2026.

== Gameplay ==
=== New classes ===
The Paladin class returned with the announcement of the expansion, becoming playable in the base game Diablo IV if players pre-purchased Diablo IV: Lord of Hatred. Alongside the Paladin, a second class, the Warlock, arrived with the expansion.

== Plot ==
Lorath Nahr and the Wanderer travel to the Yshari Sanctum to meet with Neyrelle, only to find her dead and the library burned. Her surviving notes reveal that Mephisto, in the guise of Akarat reborn, is on his way to the Skovos Isles, the birthplace of Humanity and homeland of the Amazons. She also discovered that Rathma's prophecy of the "spear of Light piercing Hatred's heart" refers to a weapon created by Lilith to defeat Mephisto. "Akarat" begins rallying those who will follow him to Skovos, where he promises to deliver them from hatred. Lorath, attempting to reach out to the Amazon Queen Adreona, is manipulated by Mephisto into nearly killing her instead, allowing "Akarat" to heal her in front of the crowd.

Using the Sightless Eye, the Wanderer enters their own mind and communes with Lilith, who remains within the Wanderer's soul. She explains that the weapon is a dagger created from one of her own bones, broken by Rathma when he rejected it, and that the weapon will banish Mephisto to the Void, where she had previously been imprisoned by Inarius, rather than allow him to be reborn in Hell. She also reveals that she is bound to Mephisto, and through her the Wanderer is bound to him as well, which allows Mephisto to corrupt them but also grants access to Mephisto's memories. They find a memory of Inarius, tortured in Mephisto's dungeons, and discover that he told Mephisto of the Pools of Creation, which he and Lilith had used to create Humanity. Lilith realizes that Mephisto's plan is to corrupt the Pools in order to spite her, and tells the Wanderer to find the pieces of her blade.

Lorath, despairing at Adreona's distrust and rejection of his aid, is met by Tyrael, the former Archangel of Justice who had become a mortal and refounded the Horadrim (as played out in Diablo III and Reaper of Souls). After the pieces of the blade are found, Tyrael leads the Wanderer and Lorath to the first Horadric vault on Mount Hefaetrus, which contains a Horadric Cube that restores Lilith's blade. Lilith then pulls the Wanderer back into the memory realm; as Mephisto prepares to overwhelm the Wanderer's soul, Lilith tells the Wanderer to sever the blood bond between them, sacrificing herself to save them. Returning to their body, the Wanderer learns from Tyrael that Lorath had gone to seek aid. As they travel up the mountain they find Lorath has been killed and beheaded by Adreona, who has been corrupted by Mephisto. Adreona falls to the Wanderer, while Lorath's head is taken by the Tree of Whispers, fulfilling the deal he had made during the hunt for Lilith.

An eclipse darkens the sky over Skovos, corrupting the Amazons who have fallen under Mephisto's influence. Tyrael opens the way to the Pools of Creation, where the Wanderer wounds "Akarat" with Lilith's blade, forcing Mephisto to show his true form. After defeating him, the Wanderer stabs Mephisto's heart with the blade, banishing him into the Void. Afterward, Tyrael and the Wanderer travel to Hawezar and burn the Tree of Whispers, releasing Lorath and the other spirits bound to it, before returning to Skovos, where they join the effort to destroy the rest of Mephisto's forces in the continent.

== Marketing and release ==
Diablo IV: Lord of Hatred was announced at The Game Awards 2025 on December 11, 2025. The expansion will add the region of Skovos and feature the Paladin as a new playable class and an additional unrevealed second class, which was later revealed to be the Warlock. Gameplay changes including overhauled end game activities and new gear crafting from the Horadric Cube, returning from prior titles.

It was released on April 28, 2026.

== Reception ==
Reception

Aggregate scores
Aggregator	Score
Metacritic	(PC) 84/100 (PS5) 85/100 (XSXS) 86/100 (NS2) 83/100
OpenCritic	90% recommend

Diablo IV: Lord of Hatred received "generally favorable" reviews from critics, according to review aggregator Metacritic. OpenCritic determined that 90% of critics recommended the game.
