= Diablo III: Rise of the Necromancer =

Diablo III game downloadable content

- Developer: Blizzard Entertainment
- Publisher: Blizzard Entertainment
- Series: Diablo
- Platforms: macOS; PlayStation 4; Windows; Xbox One; Nintendo Switch
- Release: macOS, PS4, Win, XOne; June 27, 2017; Nintendo Switch; November 2, 2018
- Genres: Action role-playing, hack and slash
- Modes: Single-player, multiplayer

Diablo III: Rise of the Necromancer is a downloadable content pack for the action role-playing video game Diablo III. It was announced at BlizzCon 2016. It was digitally released for the PC, Mac, and latest-generation console versions of Diablo III on June 27, 2017. It is included in the retail and digital release Diablo III: Eternal Collection for consoles. The pack adds the Necromancer class to Diablo III.

== Features ==
=== Necromancer class ===
The Necromancer class from Diablo II has been brought back and re-worked to integrate with Diablo III. This new class employs a controlled gameplay style centered around spells that utilise blood and bone. Additional weapons and armor have been added, including scythes and phylacteries.

=== Cosmetics ===
The pack adds two additional stash tabs and character slots; along with other cosmetic items.

=== Patch 2.6.0 ===
Diablo III: Rise of the Necromancer Patch 2.6.0 brings many new features to the game, such as the Necromancer class, Challenge Rifts, new zones and bounties. Challenge Rifts are a game mode which lets players explore new builds which have been created by other players. Each week a new class build and dungeon are featured. The player must finish the Rift faster than the original player to receive a special Horadrim cache.

== Development ==
Prior to the release of Diablo III's first expansion, Reaper of Souls, development on its second expansion, which was in the early stages of development, was cancelled as Blizzard aimed to shift development to a sequel instead of a second expansion.

In 2016, following the cancellation of a new game in development in the Diablo series, a smaller development team was tasked with working on Rise of the Necromancer for Diablo III, aimed at providing those interested in the series with content due to the lack of new Diablo releases approaching announcement or release.

Diablo III: Rise of the Necromancer was released on June 27, 2017 for PC, PlayStation 4, and Xbox One alongside a new package, Diablo III: Eternal Collection, released for consoles that also included the base game and Reaper of Souls. Rise of the Necromancer's content made it to Nintendo Switch in 2018, when the Eternal Collection package was released for the platform.

== Reception ==
Reception

Aggregate score
Aggregator	Score
Metacritic	76/100

Review scores
Publication	Score
Destructoid	7.5/10
GameRevolution	4/5
GameSpot	7/10
IGN	8.5/10

Diablo III: Rise of the Necromancer received mostly positive reviews upon release, with critics noting the small amount of content being paid for and not included in the free patch but praising the gameplay of the new class. On Metacritic, it scored an average of 76 out of 100 based on 23 critics, indicating "generally favorable reviews".

In a positive review, IGN's T.J. Hafer concluded that while he felt "$15 might be a bit much to simply unlock a new class," he "[didn't think players] would be disappointed with the new playstyles and crazy strategies Rise of the Necromancer brings to Sanctuary." Similar points were raised by GameSpot's Brett Todd, who also raised worries about the cost of the pack, stating "If not for the price, [it] would be easy to instantly recommend to fans of Diablo III or anyone with even a passing interest in trying out a classic hack-and-slash RPG." He concluded that "this is a fantastic character pack that adds one of the best, most enjoyable classes to the existing game roster."

In an overall positive review, Destructoid's Chris Carter summarized that "There could be some hard-to-ignore faults, but the experience is fun." Writing for Game Revolution, Jonathan Leack praised the introduction of the Necromancer class, stating that "[it] isn't necessarily a new class to the evil world of Diablo, but it's the best iteration yet." He concluded that, keeping in mind the minor grievances he had with the content, the pack "deserves the attention of Diablo veterans and new players alike."

In a review of Diablo III: Rise of the Necromancer in Black Gate, Matt Drought said "I believe that you will find that the Necromancer is a fantastic character addition to Diablo 3. Diablo 3 is a fun and enjoyable game in its own right, but the Necromancer's powers and abilites [sic] create new gameplay opportunities that feel fresh and exciting."
