= Diablo (series) =

Video game franchise

- Original logo
- Genres: Action role-playing, hack and slash
- Developers: Blizzard Entertainment; NetEase Games
- Publishers: Blizzard Entertainment; Sierra Entertainment
- Creator: David Brevik
- Platforms: Microsoft Windows, Classic Mac OS, macOS, PlayStation, PlayStation 3, PlayStation 4, Xbox 360, Xbox One, Nintendo Switch, PlayStation 5, Xbox Series X/S, Android, iOS
- First release: Diablo; January 3, 1997
- Latest release: Diablo IV: Lord of Hatred; April 28, 2026

Diablo is an action role-playing dungeon crawler video game series originally developed by Blizzard North and continued by Blizzard Entertainment after the original North studio shut down in 2005. The franchise is made up of the four main games: Diablo, Diablo II, Diablo III, and Diablo IV. Expansions include the third-party published Hellfire, which follows the first game; Lord of Destruction, published by Blizzard and released after the second game; Reaper of Souls, which follows the third game; Rise of the Necromancer which also follows the third game and Vessel of Hatred and Lord of Hatred, which follow the fourth game. Additional content is provided through story elements explored in other types of media forms.

== Background ==
The franchise is set in the dark fantasy world of Sanctuary, and its characters are primarily humans, angels, and various classes of demons and monsters. The first three games in the series take place in similar geographic areas, with several common areas including the town of Tristram and the region around Mount Arreat. Other notable settings include the High Heavens and the Burning Hells, two separate realms with ties to Sanctuary. The series primarily focuses on the ongoing conflict between the humans living in Sanctuary and the demon hordes who are led by Diablo, the series' overarching antagonist. The humans are occasionally aided by angels, notably the Archangel Tyrael.

The video game series' popularity and success has resulted in the publishing of several books relevant to the Diablo setting, covering a wide range of timelines of the universe. There are also comics that explore various stories within the world of Sanctuary.

As of April 8, 2020, the series has sold nearly 100 million copies worldwide.

== Premise ==
Promotional artwork released by Blizzard Entertainment, which depicts one incarnation of the franchise's eponymous villain

The universe of Diablo is divided into three realms: the High Heavens, the Burning Hells, and the human world of Sanctuary. Ever since their creation, the angels of the High Heavens and the demons of the Burning Hells have been at war with one another. Sanctuary was created by rebel angels and demons tired of the war, with their first children being dubbed Nephalem. The descendants of the Nephalem are humanity, and become a focal point for both angels and demons who wish to influence them for their own goals due to sharing angelic and demonic heritage.

The series' title character and main antagonist is Diablo, the Lord of Terror. According to the backstory and lore provided by Blizzard Entertainment, Diablo functions as one of the seven Great Evils presiding over the Burning Hells. Diablo eventually becomes the Prime Evil after absorbing the six other Great Evils, including his two brothers: Baal, the Lord of Destruction, and Mephisto, the Lord of Hatred. Two key characters who oppose Diablo in the series are Deckard Cain, an elderly scholar and the last descendant of the original Horadrim who serves as the core narrator of lore in the first three Diablo games, and Tyrael, a member of the High Heavens' ruling Angiris Council who is sympathetic to humanity.

Due to the ending of Diablo II and the events of Diablo III, some humans begin awakening their Nephalem heritage. This awakening allows them to challenge the final Evils and eventually Diablo himself, after he manipulates events to become the Prime Evil. Though initially imprisoned, Diablo escapes and the Nephalem are perceived as a threat due to felling both angels and demons.

In Diablo IV, set 50 years after Diablo III, Lilith returns to reshape Sanctuary and stop the eternal conflict, with the protagonist the Wanderer traveling to stop her.

== Games ==
Release timeline
1996	Diablo
1997	Diablo: Hellfire
1998–1999
2000	Diablo II
2001	Diablo II: Lord of Destruction
2002–2011
2012	Diablo III
2013
2014	Diablo III: Reaper of Souls
2015–2016
2017	Diablo III: Rise of the Necromancer
2018–2020
2021	Diablo II: Resurrected
2022	Diablo Immortal
2023	Diablo IV
2024	Diablo IV: Vessel of Hatred
2025
2026	Diablo II: Resurrected - Reign of the Warlock
2026	Diablo IV: Lord of Hatred
2027–2028
2029	Diablo V

=== Diablo ===
The setting of Diablo is the town of Tristram, the de facto capital of the Kingdom of Khanduras on the world of Sanctuary. The actual fighting takes place beneath the town in a maze of dungeons, catacombs, and caves that lead into the depths of Hell.

The plot of Diablo centers around a player character undertaking a series of quests to free Tristram from Hell-spawned evil, descending through twelve levels of dungeons into Hell itself (the final four levels), where the player battles the title character, Diablo, Lord of Terror—one of the seven "Evils", demon lords who once ruled Hell.

Diablo offers three character classes and the Hellfire expansion offers three more. Players can play as Warriors, Rogues (archers), or Sorcerers. Each class has its own place in the game's history, and all three classes make appearances as non-player characters in the sequel. All three classes have the same general skills and access to the same spells. Each of them has a class-specific skill (Item Repair, Trap Disarm, and Staff Recharge, respectively) that has as many drawbacks as benefits, except for Trap Disarm.

==== Hellfire ====
Hellfire offers an additional character class: the Monk, in addition to two hidden character classes: the Barbarian and the Bard. The Monk fights best with staves or his bare hands and gains bonuses from wearing light or no armor. The Barbarian can wield two handed axes with only one hand but is entirely unable to cast spells throughout most of the game. The Bard is a character with relatively balanced statistics who can wield two single-handed weapons simultaneously. The Barbarian and the Bard can only be played using a file tweak, as they were unfinished. They utilize the art of the Warrior and Rogue, respectively, and have no lore. Additional quests and multiplayer capabilities (although not over Battle.net) are also unlockable through this simple tweak.

Hellfire added two new dungeon environments on top of the four in the original Diablo: the Nest and the Crypt. Each of these environments contains various new monsters to fight, but they contain no random quests or bosses and the generated levels contain no shrines or libraries. The final boss of Hellfire, Na-Krul, is found in the last level of the Sacred Crypt.

Hellfire's development was done by Synergistic Software with help from Blizzard and published by Sierra.

=== Diablo II ===
At the end of the first game, a warrior tried to contain Diablo's soul within himself. The warrior was unable to do so, and, by the beginning of Diablo II, The Lord of Terror had taken control of the warrior's body and begun the process of freeing his two brothers, Mephisto and Baal. Players can choose from five distinct characters (seven when including the expansion) to control in their quest and explore the world of Sanctuary through four acts. At the end of each of the four acts, players face different devils, with Diablo at the end of the game.

The character classes in particular were received much better than the previous game's. Unlike its predecessor, Diablo II provides an explanation for each character class to pursue Diablo:

- The oracles of the Amazons foretold that the final battle when mankind would at last be free of angelic and demonic manipulation was at hand.
- The Barbarians also expect a "final battle", in which they would be key players in deciding the fate of the world.
- The Necromancers determine that the Evils have grown too powerful and thus ally themselves with the forces of Light to restore balance to the world.
- The Paladins, wracked with guilt over their actions during the Inquisition, seek justice upon Mephisto, the true cause of the bloody crusade.
- The Sorceresses join the battle with their mighty spells to stop the corruption of magic by the Evils.

Characters from the previous game are also present in Diablo II. The Rogues (as NPCs) are the hostesses of the player during Act I, and Sorcerers are seen regularly in Acts II and III. Unlike the original, each character has three distinct sets of skills/spells that they can use in the game. Several of the characters can also conjure magical minions, such as a Valkyrie (Amazon) or Skeletons and Golems (Necromancer). All players also have the option to hire a Rogue (Act I), a Warrior (Act II), or an Iron Wolf (a type of melee Sorcerer, Act III) to accompany them and help slay monsters. These "hirelings" have a few of their own skills and can be a great benefit to the player.

==== Lord of Destruction ====
Blizzard released Diablo II: Lord of Destruction on June 29, 2001. In the expansion, set after the events of Diablo II, players seek to destroy Diablo's brother, Baal. The expansion includes a new act, new items, and two new character classes:

- The Druids are descended from the Barbarians and have come out of hiding in preparation for the final battle between mankind and the Evils.
- The Assassins have policed the mage-clans for centuries. Now, with news that Terror and Destruction (Diablo and Baal) roam free, the Assassins unleash their fury on Hell itself.

Barbarians can also be hired in the new Act. The summoned units of the expansion characters are called "minions". Hirelings can be resurrected in Lord of Destruction and can be equipped with armor and weapons.

==== Diablo II: Resurrected ====
Diablo II: Resurrected, a remaster of Diablo II which also includes the Lord of Destruction expansion, was released in 2021 for Windows, PlayStation 4, PlayStation 5, Xbox One, Xbox Series X and Series S, and Nintendo Switch and will support cross-progression between the different platforms. The remaster includes updated graphics and rerendering of the game's cutscenes, and does not change any of its item systems or game balance.

=== Diablo III ===
Diablo III was announced at the Blizzard Worldwide Invitational on June 28, 2008. Diablo III takes place 20 years after Diablo II.

Five character classes are present in Diablo III:

- Barbarian: The only directly returning class is the Barbarian. The Barbarians have a variety of revamped skills at their disposal based on the use of their incredible physical prowess. The Barbarian is able to Whirlwind through crowds, cleave through swarms, leap across crags, and crush opponents upon landing.
- Witch Doctor: The Witch Doctor is a new character reminiscent of the Diablo II Necromancer, but with skills more traditionally associated with voodoo culture. The Witch Doctor has the ability to summon monsters, cast curses, harvest souls, and hurl poisons and explosives at enemies.
- Wizard: The Wizard is a version of the Sorceress from Diablo II or the Sorcerer from Diablo, though it is much more than a mere elementalist. The Wizard's abilities range from shooting lightning, fire, and ice at their enemies to slowing time and teleporting around enemies and through walls.
- Monk: The Monk is a melee attacker, using martial arts to cripple foes, resist damage, deflect projectiles, attack with blinding speed, and land explosive killing blows.
- Demon Hunter: The Demon Hunter is a ranged rogue class. It was the last class to be introduced, and specializes in ranged attacks, setting traps for enemies, and evasion skills.

The combat system was redone as well. Instead of the previous skill selection system used in Diablo II there is an action bar at the bottom of the screen. This change replaces the area where the potion-belt used to be in Diablo II. For the first time in the series, players are able to choose the gender of their characters upon creation. The gender of the characters affects only visuals and voices. Diablo III's release date was announced on March 15, 2012, and the game was released worldwide on May 15, 2012.

==== Reaper of Souls ====
Diablo III: Reaper of Souls is an expansion pack for Diablo III. It was revealed at Gamescom 2013. It was developed for the PC and Mac versions of Diablo III and released on March 25, 2014, for those platforms. Reaper of Souls has been ported to the PlayStation 3, PlayStation 4, Xbox 360, and Xbox One consoles. The Diablo III expansion includes a new character class, the Crusader, similar in style to the Paladin from Diablo II.

==== Rise of the Necromancer ====
Diablo III: Rise of the Necromancer is a second expansion for Diablo III. It was announced at BlizzCon 2016. It was released for the PC, Mac, and console versions of Diablo III on June 27, 2017. It introduces the Necromancer class, which prefers to strike from a distance, unleashing destruction from afar. The skeletal undead under their command overwhelm enemies before they have a chance to strike, and the horrific curses the necromancers employ cripple even the most resistant of demons. Necromancers can use their throngs of undead to create diversions, or to simply open a path for their master to escape to safety.

=== Diablo Immortal ===
Diablo Immortal is the fourth installment in the Diablo franchise, released as an MMO ARPG for iOS and Android by Blizzard Entertainment and NetEase. It was announced during BlizzCon 2018 and released on June 2, 2022. It takes place in between the events of Diablo II: Lord of Destruction and Diablo III. Diablo Immortal was met with a negative reception from fans upon announcement for its creation as a mobile game, and upon its release for the use of microtransactions.

=== Diablo IV ===
A fourth title in the series was announced at BlizzCon 2019 and was released on June 5, 2023. Diablo IV's first expansion pack, Vessel of Hatred, was released on October 7, 2024. A second expansion pack, Lord of Hatred, was released on April 26, 2026.

=== Diablo V ===
Diablo V was announced at the September 2026 Blizzcon, with a planned mid-2029 release. It is set 100 years after Diablo IV, after the world has fallen into an apocalyptic setting, with Diablo, the Lord of Terror, having taken over the world.

=== Cancelled projects ===
==== Diablo Junior ====
Diablo Junior was the working title for a cancelled single-player-only prequel to the original game. It started development after the release of Diablo II and was intended to be released on Game Boy Color and/or Game Boy Advance. The project was later moved to the original Game Boy due to the system's higher install base. It was planned to be released in three different cartridges in the style of the Pokémon games, each featuring a different class from original Diablo (warrior, rogue or sorcerer). The project was eventually scrapped due to high production costs.

==== Project Hades ====
After the release of Reaper of Souls, a development team led by Josh Mosqueira began work on a game that would be similar to Dark Souls, code-named Hades. The project was developed from 2014 to 2016 and featured an increase in difficulty and an over-the-shoulder, third-person perspective, rather than the isometric style of previous Diablo titles. The cancellation of Hades coincided with Mosqueira leaving Blizzard.

== Development ==
The origin of the first Diablo came from David Brevik while at Condor Games around 1994. Brevik was heavily inspired by the roguelike genre with turn-based combat, but with simplified role-playing game elements and a more expansive loot system. The name Diablo is taken from Mount Diablo, which Brevik lived near when he conceived the game idea. Condor was working alongside Blizzard Entertainment at the time on a separate title. Blizzard offered to help develop Brevik's idea as it shared concepts with their recent Warcraft: Orcs & Humans, but they strongly urged that Condor convert the game from turn-based to real-time combat, include multiplayer using Blizzard's Battle.net platform, and remove permadeath. Over the course of development, Blizzard acquired Condor Games, with Condor, located in San Mateo, California, becoming Blizzard North while Blizzard's main offices in Irvine, California became Blizzard South. Diablo was released in January 1997.

Diablo was a top selling game in 1997 with over a million copies sold that year, leading Blizzard to announce its sequel, Diablo II. The sequel, while retaining much of the same gameplay as the original title, used very little of the original code, and had no formal design approach. Released in June 2000, Diablo II sold over 2 million copies within a month and a half of release, and reached four million a year later.

Work on Diablo III started in 2001 at Blizzard North, but around 2003, several key figures from Blizzard North, include Brevik and the studio's founders, Max and Erich Schaefer, left the company over a dispute with Vivendi Games, the parent of Blizzard Entertainment. While the remaining staff of Blizzard North continued to work on their version of Diablo III, Blizzard closed down the studio in August 2005 and scrapped most of the work on the existing Diablo III title and restarted its development within its own teams. Even after restarting development, Diablo III had a protracted development, but eventually was released in May 2012. Its initial launch was met with some criticism for changes from the prior Diablo formula, as well as requiring players to be connected to the Internet to play, but over ongoing patches and updates, Blizzard has been said to have improved the game from this initial take.

== Gameplay ==
Maps for the in-game world are randomly generated in each Diablo game, which increases the replayability. Maps became larger and larger while the series evolved. Due to its procedurally generated maps and hack and slash nature, Diablo shares some similar mechanics as early roguelike games, though with real-time gameplay, graphics, and sound. It was in fact originally conceived and pitched to Blizzard as what amounted to a graphical roguelike. The adventurer being based in a town above the dungeon and being able to use "scrolls of town portal" is a specific influence from Moria. The gameplay loop for Diablo games relies on a constant search for better weapons and armor, known as loot. Items are randomly generated and usually have many attributes assigned to them. As a video game series which developed around point and click gameplay mechanics, the mouse is traditionally used for moving and using abilities in PC versions of Diablo video games.

=== Character classes ===
Character classes	Main series					Spin-offs
Character classes	Diablo (1996)	Diablo II (2000)	Diablo III (2012)	Diablo IV (2023)	Diablo V (2029)	Diablo Immortal (2029)
Monk	X	y	X		X	X
Rogue	X			X		
Sorcerer	X	X		X		
Warrior	X					
Amazon		X		X		
Assassin		X				
Barbarian		X	X	X		X
Druid		X		X		X
Necromancer		X	X	X		X
Paladin		X		X		
Warlock		X		X		X
Crusader			X			X
Demon Hunter			X		X	X
Witch Doctor			X			
Wizard			X			X
Spiritborn				X		
Plague Knight					X	
Blood Knight						X
Tempest						X

- Diablo includes Diablo: Hellfire expansion.
- Diablo II includes Diablo II: Lord of Destruction expansion, Diablo II: Resurrected remake and Diablo II: Resurrected – Reign of the Warlock DLC.
- Diablo III includes Diablo III: Reaper of Souls expansion and Diablo III: Rise of the Necromancer DLC.
- Diablo IV includes Diablo IV: Vessel of Hatred expansion, Diablo IV: Lord of Hatred expansion and future Amazon Class Pack DLC.

== Other media ==
=== Comics ===
Tales of Sanctuary by Phil Amara, Dave Land, and Francisco Ruiz Velasco is a comic book released on November 9, 2001, by Dark Horse Comics. It features three stories:

- Rage is about Azgar, a Druid in his struggle against Baal's minions.
- The Hand of Naz is about Renit the Dark Stalker, a Barbarian who allies with the Necromancer Cairo to find the titular artifact.
- Hatred's Bride is about Hale, a Paladin who saves a girl, Bay, from demons and seeks to protect her.

In November 2011, DC Comics started producing a five-issue miniseries (Diablo III: Sword of Justice) by Aaron Williams with art and covers by Joseph LaCroix.

=== Animated series ===
An animated series based on Diablo was in development after Netflix optioned the property from Blizzard in 2020, but fell through after Blizzard sued Netflix over the "poaching" of Blizzard's chief financial officer, Spencer Neumann. During the September 2026 Blizzcon, Blizzard affirmed that new development on the Diablo animated series at Netflix had been started.

=== Merchandise ===
Action figures for the Barbarian character class, the Unraveller monster, and the Diablo character were sold in Blizzard's online store and at retailers to complement the release of Diablo II.

An 18-inch collectible statue of Diablo III's Barbarian class has been produced for sale by Sideshow Collectibles.

=== Crossover appearances ===
==== Heroes of the Storm ====
In 2015, Blizzard released Heroes of the Storm, a crossover multiplayer online battle arena video game, in which players can control over 15 characters from the Diablo universe as playable heroes. All character classes from Diablo III, popular classes from Diablo II, as well as notable characters from the franchise, including Deckard Cain, Diablo, Malthael, Mephisto, and Tyrael are represented within the game. Heroes of the Storm features two Diablo-themed battlegrounds, Battlefield of Eternity and Infernal Shrines. Various soundtracks from Diablo franchise, such as Jungle (Act III) and Ancients from Diablo II, and Reaper of Souls from Diablo III, are present as background music in the game.

==== World of Warcraft ====
Characters from the series have also appeared in World of Warcraft, a massively multiplayer online role-playing game created and developed by Blizzard set in the Warcraft universe, usually as Easter egg references or in-game "pet" companions. Examples include miniature versions of Diablo and Tyrael, a flying mount usable by the player character called Tyrael's Charger, and a composite character named Murkablo.

== Reception ==
Aggregate review scores As of June 19, 2022.
Game	GameRankings	Metacritic
Diablo	PC: 89% PS: 80%	PC: 94
Diablo II	PC: 89%	PC: 88
Diablo III	PC: 88%	PC: 88/100; PS3: 86/100; X360: 87/100; PS4: 90/100; XONE: 86/100; NS: 88/100
Diablo II: Resurrected		NS: 78/100; PC: 80/100; PS5: 81/100; XSXS: 80/100
Diablo Immortal		iOS: 69/100; PC: 60/100
Diablo IV		PC: 87/100; PS5: 88/100; XSXS: 92/100

The games in the Diablo series on all release platforms have received generally favorable reviews from critics. Both Diablo and Diablo II are considered to be among the best video games of all time, and each entry in the series has been successful financially. Diablo II sold 4 million copies in the year it was released. Diablo III sold 3.5 million copies in the first day and 6.3 million copies in the first week. Another 1.2 million copies were given to subscribers to Blizzard's Annual Pass service. The Diablo III release was the fastest-selling PC game of all time.

The title character of the franchise has been well received as its overarching antagonist. Time magazine named Diablo the second most influential video game character of all time, calling the character "gaming's archetypal foozle, an illimitable damage sponge into which players pour a game's worth of tactical preparation, informed by scrupulous looting, savvy inventory juggling and ability streamlining". Diablo placed #44 on a list of top 50 video game villains featured by Guinness World Records in 2013. GamePro ranked Diablo #14 on its list of the most diabolical video game villains of all time, noting that he "corrupts the soul of the hero of Diablo I in order to reincarnate in Diablo II ".IGN ranked Diablo 74th in their list of "Top 100 Video Game Villains", as well as their pick for the third best Blizzard character in a list published in 2017. Complex staff ranked Diablo 7th in their list of the 50 coolest video game villains of all time, describing the character as the "epitome of all evil comes in the form of a giant red behemoth that resembles the classic image of Satan as portrayed in most Judeo-Christian imagery, and he's one bad muh."

Other recurring characters in the series, such as Deckard Cain and Tyrael, have also been positively received. In 2016, Glixel staff ranked Tyrael the 39th most iconic video game character of the 21st century, and his unwavering opposition against the Prime Evils after they have been unwittingly released to be the character's most "iconic moment".

== Legal issues ==
In May 2021, Blizzard Entertainment commenced legal proceedings against Fox Media in a dispute over the trademark rights for the name "Diablo". Fox sought to register the name "Diablo" with the U.S. Patent and Trademark Office in an apparent effort to market merchandise relating to a character of the same name from the adult animated sitcom HouseBroken, which premiered on May 31, 2021. Blizzard's legal representatives sought to rebut Fox's application and argued in their filing that Fox's use of the term "Diablo" for the HouseBroken character is “likely to cause confusion or mistake or to deceive”.
