= Medbed =

Pseudoscientific device to extend life

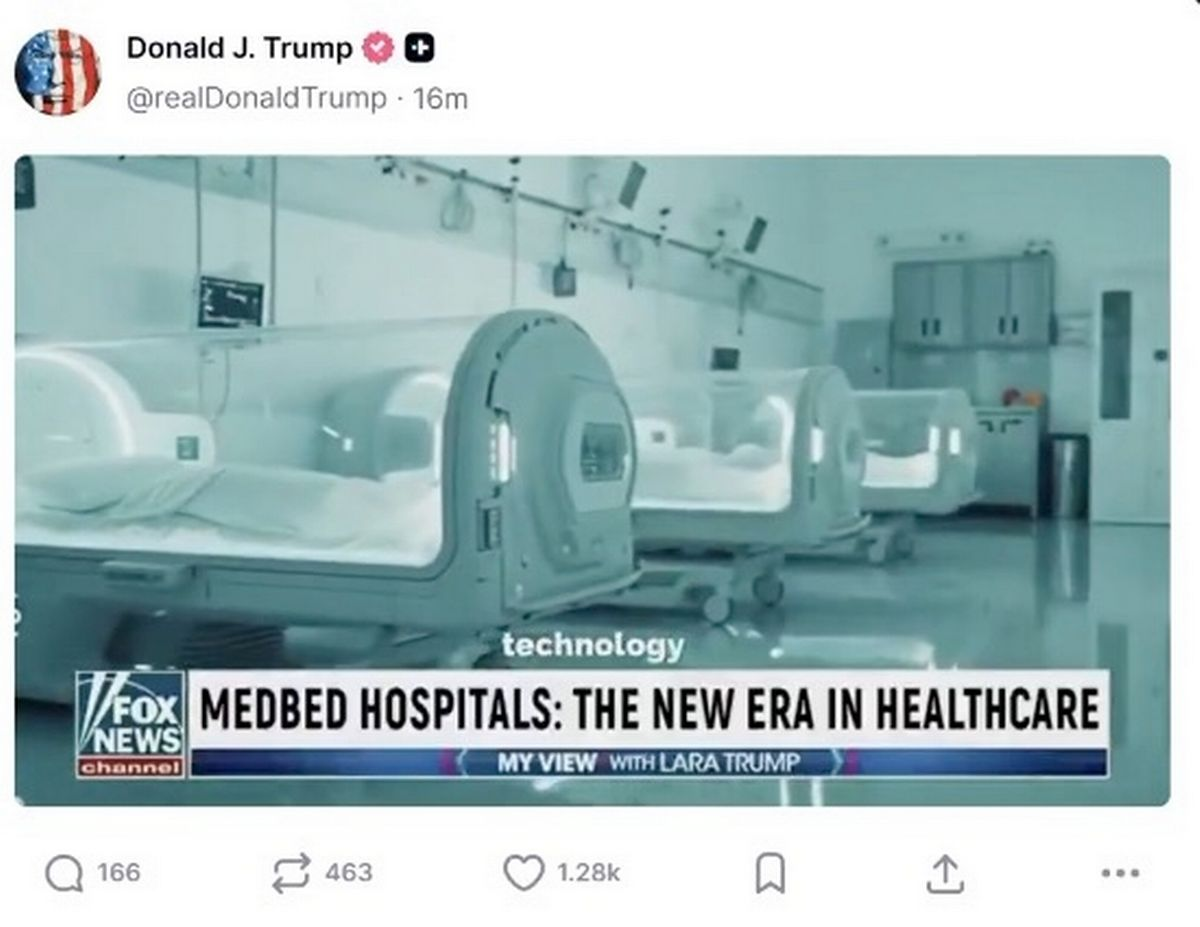
AI-generated depiction of medbeds shared to Donald Trump's Truth Social account

Medbeds (short for "medical beds" or "meditation beds") are a nonexistent medical technology that became prominent in conspiracy theory narratives in the early 2020s. Medbeds can supposedly cure any condition but have been kept secret from the general public and reserved for the elite.

Theories about medbeds are popular in QAnon and far-right online spaces, where it is claimed that there are secret devices that can cure all disease, regrow limbs, and reverse aging. Promoters often describe them as hidden military or alien technology withheld from the public, with myths tying them to figures like John F. Kennedy. The idea spread widely on Telegram, TikTok, and other platforms. Businesses have exploited the trend by selling medbed stays or devices with pseudoscientific claims, with some facing Food and Drug Administration warnings. Experts and journalists have debunked the claims as pseudoscience, noting the risks to believers of delaying real medical care while awaiting supposed rollouts.

== Overview ==
Videos and podcasts about medbeds have become popular in far-right communities on Telegram, Discord, and Rumble. There are supposedly three types of medbeds, located in secret military tunnels: a holographic medbed, which diagnoses and cures any sickness; a medbed that regenerates missing limbs in minutes; and a medbed that reverses aging. Various companies sell devices or access to medbeds that supposedly heal ailments via pseudoscientific technologies while also including the Quack Miranda warning on their websites. The term medbed is also used by one company that offers nightly rentals in rooms in their facilities with "highly energized" beds.

Medbed conspiracy theories often involve claims that the devices are used by members of a deep state or billionaires, and that their existence has been deliberately withheld from the public. One version of the theory claims that John F. Kennedy is still alive on a medbed. Belief in these devices is popular among QAnon influencers such as Michael Protzman, Romana Didulo, and YamatoQ.

== Origins and spread ==
The idea of medbeds circulated in QAnon and adjacent wellness/techno-mysticism spaces by the early 2020s, with claims ranging from military and alien origins to promises of instant cures and age reversal. Academic and media reporting trace the spread primarily through Telegram, Facebook and TikTok communities that blend New Age vocabulary ("frequencies", "biophotons", "quantum") with conspiracy narratives about elites hoarding technology. Reporting in 2023–2025 documented dedicated discussion boards and viral short-form videos repeating core claims of limb regeneration, total disease reversal, and "rollout soon" timelines.

On September 27, 2025, an AI-generated video styled as a breaking news clip from My View with Lara Trump on Fox News, claiming that a rollout of "MedBed hospitals" and "MedBed cards" was imminent, was posted to Donald Trump's account on Truth Social. Multiple outlets reported the clip was fabricated; Fox News stated that the segment had "never aired" on its network. Earlier reporting detailed the conspiracy’s popularity among QAnon influencers and linked myths (e.g., "JFK on a medbed"). The post was deleted the next day, on Sunday morning.

== Claims and debunking ==
Typical iterations describe three types of medbeds (holographic diagnostic/curative, regenerative/limb-growing, and age-reversing), sometimes attributed to secret military programs or alien technology; no credible evidence of such devices exists. Analyses by science communicators characterize medbeds as a mélange of pseudoscientific buzzwords (e.g., biophotons, terahertz, frequencies) that conflict with established biology and clinical evidence.

== Commercialization and regulatory actions ==
Although no medbed devices exist as described by conspiracy promoters, some businesses market medbed experiences or devices with vague "energy" claims and disclaimers. There are medbed centers selling overnight stays and canister-based devices branded as exuding "life force energy", alongside social media recruitment of customers seeking cures.

In 2022, Swiss company 90.10 sold devices to convert regular beds into medbeds, purporting to use "quantum energy and frequencies" to grant users "infinite energy" and the option to "reprogram your DNA". A Monmouth University researcher who bought and tested a device reported that the user is told to lie on the bed and speak a phrase like "med bed, scan me", and is then "supposed to feel something". 90.10's legal disclaimers say that the product name is short for "meditation bed" and that the product "is not intended to diagnose, treat, cure, or prevent any disease".

In August 2023, the FDA issued a warning letter to Tesla BioHealing, Inc., citing "misbranding" and unapproved medical-device claims for products marketed with "life force energy/biophotons". Science communicators have also described registration-fee scams and medbed branding used by wellness vendors without clinical evidence.

== Reception ==
Journalists and researchers describe medbeds as a harm-prone medical misinformation vector that encourages some believers to delay or forgo conventional care while awaiting a promised rollout. McGill University's Office for Science and Society characterizes the phenomenon as a recurring promise of imminent salvation that leverages pseudoscientific jargon and shifting timelines.

== See also ==
- Alternative medicine – Unscientific healthcare practices
- Battery theory
- Cryonics – Freezing of a corpse with the intent of future revival
