= Lilith (Diablo) =

Fictional character from the Diablo franchise

- Diablo character
- Concept art of Lilith for Diablo IV
- First appearance: Diablo II: Lord of Destruction Pandemonium Event (2005)
- Created by: Blizzard Entertainment
- Voiced by: Caroline Faber

In-universe information
- Species: Demon
- Title(s): Daughter of Hatred; Mother of Sanctuary
- Family: Mephisto (father); Lucion (brother); Rathma (son)
- Significant other: Inarius

Lilith is a character in Blizzard Entertainment's Diablo franchise. A demon known as the Daughter of Hatred, she is portrayed as the daughter of the Prime Evil Mephisto and the former partner of the angel Inarius. Together, Lilith and Inarius created the mortal realm of Sanctuary, the setting of the Diablo series, and produced the Nephalem who are the ancestors of humanity. The character draws on traditions surrounding the mythological Lilith, particularly her associations with demons, motherhood, exile and blood.

Lilith first appeared briefly as an optional boss in the Pandemonium Event, a bonus quest added to Diablo II: Lord of Destruction in 2005. Her characterization and role in the franchise were subsequently developed in Richard A. Knaak's The Sin War trilogy. She later appeared through voiced lore entries in Diablo III: Reaper of Souls (2014), before becoming the principal antagonist of Diablo IV (2023), in which she is voiced by Caroline Faber.

Critical discussion of Lilith has focused on her maternal presentation, her opposition to both Heaven and Hell, and the tension between her stated desire to protect humanity and her violent methods. Commentators have described her as a more morally ambiguous antagonist than earlier villains in the series, while academic analysis has examined her connection to the Nephalem and the franchise's treatment of theological dualism and humanity's capacity for both good and evil.

== Concept and creation ==
Lilith's characterization draws selectively from mythology and folklore associated with the traditional Lilith. The game character differs from the mythological figure by making her one of Sanctuary's creators and the mother of the Nephalem, who combine angelic and demonic ancestry.

Lilith was selected as the central antagonist of Diablo IV during the game's early artistic development. Art director John Mueller recalled that the development team examined an early medieval- and Renaissance-inspired image depicting the creation of Sanctuary, with Inarius represented in light and Lilith concealed in darkness. According to Mueller, the image led the developers to conclude that the game's story should be built around Lilith. Game director Luis Barriga said that using her also enabled the series to explore figures beyond Diablo himself rather than immediately returning to the title demon.

The cinematic used to announce Diablo IV was designed as a progression through action, horror and what the developers described as a final, almost divine revelation. Lilith's appearance at the conclusion was intended to reframe the preceding blood ritual as her rebirth and establish her as the focus of the game. The developers referred to her as the "Queen of Sanctuary" and regarded the final image of her emerging through a membrane of blood as the cinematic's defining shot.

Artist Gerald Brom produced concept art for Lilith's Diablo IV cinematic design. Her high-resolution cinematic model was developed collaboratively by Blizzard's cinematics division, with artists working on its sculpting, modeling, texturing, rigging and animation. Caroline Faber provided Lilith's voice in Diablo IV and reprised the role in Lord of Hatred.

For Lord of Hatred, the writers repositioned Lilith as an ally against Mephisto without presenting her as reformed. Narrative designers Matt Burns and Eleni Rivera said that part of Lilith had remained within the player character after the consumption of her blood petals in Diablo IV. Rivera emphasized that Lilith remained a demon with independent motives despite her concern for Sanctuary. The expansion also introduced dialogue choices through which players could express differing attitudes toward their alliance with her.

== Appearances ==
=== Earlier appearances ===
Lilith was introduced to the games through the Pandemonium Event, a post-release quest for Diablo II: Lord of Destruction as part of patch 1.11 which was released on August 1, 2005. She appears in the Matron's Den as an optional high-level boss encountered while the player gathers the components needed to enter Über Tristram.

Her narrative role was developed more extensively in Richard A. Knaak's The Sin War trilogy. Set in Sanctuary's distant past, the novels portray Lilith and Inarius as former lovers who abandoned the Eternal Conflict between the High Heavens and Burning Hells and created Sanctuary as a refuge. Their children, the Nephalem, possessed powers that exceeded those of angels and demons. When other inhabitants of Sanctuary considered destroying them to prevent the realm's discovery, Lilith killed the dissenters and was banished to the Void by Inarius.

In the novels, Lilith returns and manipulates the human Uldyssian ul-Diomed, seeking to awaken the latent Nephalem powers of humanity and transform humans into an army capable of defeating both Heaven and Hell. Her plans place her in conflict with Inarius and with the competing religions seeking control over Sanctuary.

Lilith makes a minor voice-only appearance in Diablo III: Reaper of Souls (2014) through a four-part series of collectible audio journals titled "The Writings of Lilith". Found in the Pandemonium Fortress, the entries recount her growing dissatisfaction with the Eternal Conflict, her capture of Inarius, their theft of the Worldstone and creation of Sanctuary, and her intention to produce children with him.

=== Diablo IV ===
In Diablo IV, the cultist Elias summons Lilith back to Sanctuary. The player character, known as the Wanderer, is drugged by villagers influenced by Lilith and made to consume petals containing her blood, establishing a supernatural connection through which the Wanderer witnesses parts of her journey.

Lilith presents herself as humanity's mother and argues that Sanctuary must become strong enough to free itself from manipulation by Heaven and Hell. She encourages humans to abandon established religious and moral restrictions, but her influence also produces murder, fanaticism and blood sacrifice. She gathers followers while travelling toward Caldeum and the gateway to Hell, intending to absorb Mephisto's essence before he can return to full strength. Lilith later discovers the body of Rathma, one of the children she had with Inarius, after he has been killed by his own father. She mourns the potential future taken from her by his death, and retrieves the key to Hell from his staff to continue her campaign.

After confronting Inarius, who believes killing her will restore his place in Heaven, Lilith kills him and continues into Hell. The Wanderer ultimately rejects her proposal to become humanity's leader and defeats her before she can absorb Mephisto. Before dying, she warns that defeating her will leave Sanctuary vulnerable to the Prime Evils.

=== Lord of Hatred ===
Although Lilith is absent from most of Diablo IV: Vessel of Hatred, her influence remains part of the series' continuing conflict with Mephisto. A review by GameSpot contrasted the expansion's less visible antagonists with Lilith's persistent presence in the original campaign and described her absence as significant.

In Diablo IV: Lord of Hatred, a remnant of Lilith survives within the Wanderer through the blood petals previously consumed. As Mephisto approaches full strength, she re-emerges and assists the Wanderer against him. Their alliance is presented as circumstantial: Lilith wishes to preserve Sanctuary, but continues to pursue her own demonic interests and does not renounce her previous actions. Critics continued to identify her visual presence and Faber's performance as prominent elements of the expansion.

== Promotion ==
Lilith was used as a central figure in the promotion of Diablo IV. At The Game Awards 2022, singer Halsey performed the song "Lilith" while a cinematic featuring the character was shown and the game's release date was announced. In June 2023, Halsey and Suga of BTS released a new version of the song titled "Lilith (Diablo IV Anthem)", accompanied by a music video produced as part of the game's launch campaign.

== Reception and analysis ==
=== Critical reception ===
Lilith received attention for departing from the more straightforward demonic antagonists of earlier Diablo games. Tauriq Moosa of The Verge argued that Lilith gave the franchise a villain capable of making its story more complex and contemplative. He highlighted her restrained speech, maternal concern for Sanctuary and ability to make the game's moral conflict appear less absolute. Moosa wrote that her arguments compelled players to consider whether the established forces opposing her were genuinely preferable. Alessandro Barbosa of GameSpot similarly praised the gradual development of Lilith's motivation. He observed that she was not motivated solely by destruction, but by grief over Sanctuary's use as another battlefield in the Eternal Conflict. Although her methods made her the game's antagonist, Barbosa considered it notable that the narrative encouraged players to examine the substance of her argument. In an earlier preview, he wrote that Lilith's direct appearances were limited but that her influence could be felt throughout the world through corrupted inhabitants, sacrifices and the erosion of social restraints.

Keith Stuart of The Guardian described Lilith as an example of the game's attempt at greater nuance, noting that she was not entirely villainous while Inarius was not entirely good. Boone Ashworth of Wired characterized her appeal to Sanctuary's inhabitants more bluntly as an invitation to embrace violence, observing that her influence was demonstrated through scenes of ordinary people becoming murderously uninhibited. Joanna Nelius of PC Gamer identified parallels including her demonic motherhood, refusal to submit to an established order, exile from an original home and association with blood sacrifice.

Lilith's characterization in Diablo IV was compared to that of a cult leader. Paul Tassi of Forbes described her as a "cult leader-like enemy", considering her a significant improvement over Diablo and the franchise's earlier demonic antagonists. Tassi later praised the extent of Lilith's influence over Sanctuary, describing her as a cult-like figure who exerted control across the game's setting.

The character's presence was also used by critics to evaluate later installments. In his review of Vessel of Hatred, Barbosa argued that its antagonists lacked the tangible and continuous threat that Lilith had provided in Diablo IV, describing the effect of her absence as profound. In reviewing Lord of Hatred, Polygon praised Lilith's visual design and the authority of Faber's vocal performance, describing her as one of the strongest elements of the expansion.

The cinematic depiction of Lilith was nominated for Outstanding Animated Character in an Episode, Commercial, Game Cinematic or Real-Time Project at the 22nd Visual Effects Society Awards. The nomination recognized artists Matt Onheiber, Kenny Huang, Maia Neubig and Jongha Baik for their work on the "Inarius and Lilith" cinematic.

Lilith's imposing stature also attracted commentary and comparisons with other unusually tall female video game antagonists. Rock Paper Shotgun compared her with Lady Dimitrescu from Resident Evil Village, concluding from an unofficial estimate that Lilith was the shorter of the two.

=== Analysis ===
In a comparative academic study of multiple gothic-themed video game franchises, Scholars Frank G. Bosman and Marcel Poorthuis identified Lilith and the Nephalem as an important part of the series' cosmology even before Diablo IV, arguing that pairing Lilith with the Nephalem complicates the traditional cosmological division between good and evil, and thus allowing the franchise to move beyond a simple opposition between absolute moral alignments. In their analysis, humanity's mixed angelic and demonic origin creates an anthropological model in which moral good and evil coexist within human beings rather than belonging exclusively to opposing supernatural factions.
