= Elysium (soundtrack) =

Elysium (Original Motion Picture Soundtrack)

Film score by Ryan Amon
- Released: August 6, 2013
- Recorded: 2012–2013
- Studio: Abbey Road Studios, London; Sonic Fuel Studios, El Segundo, California; Clearstory Sound, Los Angeles
- Genre: Film score
- Length: 61:23
- Label: Varèse Sarabande
- Producer: Ryan Amon

Ryan Amon chronology
Elysium (2013)	Assassin's Creed Unity (2014)

Elysium (Original Motion Picture Soundtrack) is the film score to the 2013 film Elysium directed by Neill Blomkamp starring Matt Damon. The score is composed by Ryan Amon in his feature film debut and is performed by the London Philharmonic Orchestra. The album was released through Varèse Sarabande on August 6, 2013.

== Background and development ==
Elysium is the feature debut composition for Ryan Amon, who previously provided music for film trailers. While living with his wife's family in Bolivia, he received an email from Blomkamp, who came across a YouTube video which featured his music posted by an anonymous fan; Blomkamp liked that music and posted an email to Amon which he did not take it serious until one of his assistants followed up and contacted Amon through Skype and Blomkamp discussed about the film and the musical palette eventually accepting his involvement in the project.

Amon described writing music for a film set in a futuristic period was tricky where he was refrained from watching any footage of the film or reading the script but had few images of Damon's character in his exosuit. The initial idea was to write music based on the descriptions of something dark or light which was difficult and had experimented a lot before finalizing a sound palette that resonated with Blomkamp's vision. Initially Amon considered working on orchestral themes but as production progressed, it became more apparent for him to take a different path, utilizing organic sounds from a non-traditional standpoint. Amon though not having any idea of how futuristic music would sound, had proceeded with the organic melding of synthesis and orchestral instrumentation which worked for the film, as too much of synthetic elements or synthesizers would backfire. He used traditional instruments such as piano strings and violin strings and scraped them metallically in order to create a sound that did not feel dated. The orchestral portions were recorded at the Abbey Road Studios in London with the London Philharmonic Orchestra performing.

Amon approached the film in a psychological way over a musical way, where he played two notes of a keyboard, with particular emotions being channelized in mind and curated a list of vocabulary words of how these two notes would feel like. Having realized that much of the music would be written from his background in music, he thought of a wider spectrum in terms of colors and instruments, as being a visual person, Amon would feel that a picture or pacing of that moving scene would tell him what to write, with the color schemes and camera angles aid him musically. Blomkamp was much involved in developing the sonic palette with the chattering of colobus monkeys with baboons. Having considered watch the footage with music being a bit cringe worthy, the team would use some of his score as temp tracks which would be manipulated and experimented with the soundscape. Through the process, Amon had composed around 200 tracks for the film, with a handful of being selected in the final edit and was cut down to nearly one hour of music. Amon further flew to Vancouver to work with the post-production team on the final edit.

== Track listing ==
No.	Title	Length
1.	"Heaven and Earth"	4:27
2.	"Fire Up The Shuttle"	1:44
3.	"Unauthorized Entry"	4:35
4.	"Deportation"	1:54
5.	"Darkness"	4:49
6.	"Things to Come"	4:35
7.	"You Said You'd Do Anything"	3:29
8.	"A Political Sickness"	3:47
9.	"Arming Projectile"	1:25
10.	"Zero Injuries Sustained"	1:29
11.	"I'd Like Them Dead"	1:20
12.	"You Have No Idea"	2:11
13.	"The Raven"	1:57
14.	"Let the Girls Out"	2:07
15.	"I Don't Want to Die"	1:35
16.	"Matilda"	2:52
17.	"Step Aboard"	2:53
18.	"Heading to Elysium"	1:53
19.	"Keep Them Busy"	0:52
20.	"When He Wakes Up"	1:39
21.	"We Do the Hanging"	1:06
22.	"Kruger Suits Up"	2:25
23.	"The Armory"	0:58
24.	"I'm Right Behind You"	0:37
25.	"Fire and Water"	2:01
26.	"The Gantry"	1:08
27.	"Breaking a Promise"	3:17
28.	"Elysium"	3:44
29.	"New Heaven, New Earth"	2:22
Total length:		69:11

== Reception ==
Jonathan Broxton of Movie Music UK wrote "Considering that Elysium is Ryan Amon's first ever score, the music on display is remarkably assured, confident, and free from any sort of tentativeness one might otherwise have expected from a debutant composer. Some of the sound design elements show the mark of real musical free thinking, especially in the way some of the vocals are manipulated and transformed into wholly unique sounds. This is the hallmark of a composer who is clearly writing in his comfort zone, and who was given the independence to be inventive and inquisitive and experimental without compromising the integrity of the story." Filmtracks wrote "any composer could hope for this kind of debut effort, and given its diversity of textures and emotions, it will likely serve as an excellent survey of Amon's capabilities for future employers".

James Southall of Movie Wave wrote "Elysium is a slightly unusual album, really – about half of it is disposable, often downright unpleasant Man of Steel-era Zimmer stuff; and the other half is really entertaining, sometimes quite creative music that's really very enjoyable. It's certainly not subtle music, most of it is rather simple, but there's enough there to suggest that Amon could have a decent career in film scoring ahead of him. The worry would be that most of the powers-that-be would think that because of the unpleasant half rather than the other half!" Pete Simons of Synchrotones wrote "Elysium always sounds organic [...] This is the current and future sound of film music – and we're going to need more people like Amon to develop it to its full potential."

Scott Foundas of Variety wrote "Other craft work is similarly first-rate, including tyro composer Ryan Amon's judiciously used basso profondo score." Tim Grierson of Screen International wrote "Ryan Amon's score mostly focuses on rumbling, mechanical music, which adds constant dread, but the incorporation of exotic, mournful chanting during would-be harrowing moments borders on the eye-rolling pomposity of a Michael Bay film." Suprateek Chatterjee of Firstpost wrote "Elysium, whose musical score is by newcomer Ryan Amon, overuses this cue and many others from Zimmer's oeuvre (like his trademark staccato violin riffs from The Dark Knight trilogy)."

== Additional music ==
List of songs featured in the film but not included in the soundtrack:

- Ghosst – performed by Lorn
- Robot Eater – performed by Gambit
- The Pining Pt2 – performed by Chris Clark (as Clark) with Martina Topley-Bird
- We Got More (Kilon TeK Remix) – performed by Brendan Angelides (as Eskmo)
- Metropolis (Dan Le Sac Remix) – performed by PRDCTV
- Piano Sonata No. 8 in C minor 'Pathetique' – Adagio Cantabile – Written by Ludwig van Beethoven
- Suite For Solo Cello No.1 BWV 1007 – Written by Johann Sebastian Bach
- Kou Kou – performed by Palms Down Percussion
- Twitch (It Grows and It Grows) – performed by Raffertie
- Piano Concerto No. 4 in G Major – Rondo Vivace – Written by Ludwig van Beethoven
- Bio Techno – Written and performed by Audio Android
- Loner – performed by Burial
- New World Disorder – performed by Arkasia
- Six Degrees – performed by Kryptic Minds
- Stjernekiggeri – Written and performed by Mike Sheridan
- Sierra Leone – performed by Mt Eden

== Personnel ==
Credits adapted from liner notes:

- Music composer and producer – Ryan Amon
- Orchestra – London Philharmonia
- Orchestrator – Alain Mayrand
- Orchestra contractor and coordinator – Paul Talkington
- Recording and mixing – John Rodd
- Mastering – Patricia Sullivan
- Music editors – Dave Lawrence, Rich Walters
- Music supervisor – Liz Gallacher
- Executive producer – Robert Townson
- Executive in charge of music for Sony Pictures – Lia Vollack
- Music librarian – Allan Wilson
- Scoring crew – John Barret, Matt Jones
- Assistant engineer (soloist) – Patrick Spain
- Recording engineer (soloist) – Damon Tedesco
- Cello (soloist) – Timothy Walden
- Vocals (Khoomi overtone singing) – Egschiglen
- Vocals (Tuvan throat singing) – Huun-Huur-Tu
- Vocals (soloist) – Francesca Genco
