= Diablo III =

2012 action role-playing video game

- Developer: Blizzard Entertainment (Note: Iron Galaxy co-developed the Nintendo Switch version.)
- Publisher: Blizzard Entertainment
- Director: Jay Wilson
- Producers: Ray Gresko; Alex Mayberry
- Designers: Kevin Martens; David M. Adams
- Programmer: Jason Regier
- Artist: Christian Lichtner
- Writer: Chris Metzen
- Composers: Russell Brower; Derek Duke; Edo Guidotti; Laurence Juber; Joseph Lawrence; Glenn Stafford
- Series: Diablo
- Platforms: OS X; Windows; PlayStation 3; Xbox 360; PlayStation 4; Xbox One; Nintendo Switch
- Release: OS X, Windows; May 15, 2012; PlayStation 3, Xbox 360; September 3, 2013; PlayStation 4, Xbox One; August 19, 2014; Nintendo Switch; November 2, 2018
- Genres: Action role-playing, hack and slash
- Modes: Single-player, multiplayer

Diablo III is a 2012 action role-playing game developed and published by Blizzard Entertainment as the third installment in the Diablo franchise. It was released for Microsoft Windows and OS X in May 2012, PlayStation 3 and Xbox 360 in September 2013, PlayStation 4 and Xbox One in August 2014, and Nintendo Switch in November 2018. Set 20 years after the events of Diablo II, players control one of seven character classes – Barbarian, Crusader, Demon Hunter, Monk, Necromancer, Witch Doctor, or Wizard – and are tasked with defeating Diablo.

An expansion pack, Reaper of Souls, was released for PC in March 2014. It was released for consoles as part of the Diablo III: Ultimate Evil Edition version in August 2014. The Rise of the Necromancer pack was released for Windows, macOS, PlayStation 4 and Xbox One in June 2017. Diablo III: Eternal Collection, combining Reaper of Souls and Rise of the Necromancer, was released for PlayStation 4 and Xbox One in June 2017, and for the Nintendo Switch in November 2018.

The game received positive reviews, although its always-on DRM feature was criticized. The game set a new record for "fastest-selling PC game" by selling over 3.5 million copies in the first 24 hours of its release, and became the best-selling PC game of 2012 by selling over 12 million copies. As of August 2015, the number of sales had grown to over 30 million. A sequel, Diablo IV, was announced in 2019 and was released on June 5, 2023.

== Gameplay ==
Much like Diablo and Diablo II, Diablo III is an action role-playing game with fast-paced real-time combat and an isometric graphics engine. The game utilizes classic dark fantasy elements and players assume the role of a heroic character charged with saving the world of Sanctuary from the forces of Hell. Many role-playing elements are present, such as choosing a character class, gaining experience and leveling up, and acquiring more powerful equipment.

The quality and attributes of equipment are randomized. In addition to base stats (such as damage and attack speed for weapons or armor points on armor) higher-quality items have additional properties such as extra damage, attribute bonuses, bonuses to critical hit chance, or sockets, which allow items to be upgraded with a gem. Magic-quality items have up to three random properties, rare-quality items have up to six, and legendary-quality items typically have up to eight with varying degrees of randomness. Set items are a subtype of legendary items which provide additional, cumulative bonuses if multiple items from the same set are equipped at once. Higher level monsters tend to drop higher level items, which tend to have higher base stats and bonuses.

The proprietary engine incorporates Blizzard's custom in-house physics, and features destructible environments with an in-game damage effect. The developers sought to make the game run on a wide range of systems without requiring DirectX 10. Diablo III uses a custom 3D game engine in order to present an overhead view to the player, in a somewhat similar way to the isometric view used in previous games in the series. Enemies utilize the 3D environment as well, in ways such as crawling up the side of a wall from below into the combat area.

As in Diablo II, multiplayer games are possible using Blizzard's Battle.net service, with many of the new features developed for StarCraft II also available in Diablo III. Players are able to drop in and out of sessions of co-operative play with other players. Unlike its predecessor, Diablo III requires players to be connected to the internet constantly due to their digital rights management policy, even for single-player games.

An enhanced quest system, a random level generator, and a random encounter generator are used in order to ensure the game provides different experiences when replayed.

Unlike previous iterations, gold can be picked up by touching it, or coming within range (adjusted by gear) rather than having to manually pick it up. One of the new features intended to speed up gameplay is that health orbs drop from enemies, replacing the need to have a potion bar. The latter is replaced by a skill bar that allows a player to assign quick bar buttons to skills and spells; previously, players could only assign two skills (one for each mouse button) and had to swap skills with the keyboard or mousewheel. Players can still assign specific attacks to mouse buttons.

Skill runes, another new feature, are skill modifiers that are unlocked as the player levels up. Unlike the socketable runes in Diablo II, skill runes are not items but instead provide options for enhancing skills, often completely changing the gameplay of each skill. For example, one skill rune for the Wizard's meteor ability reduces its arcane power cost, while another turns the meteor to ice, causing cold damage rather than fire.

Diablo III's inventory and HUD retain a feel similar to that found in earlier games in the series, including a viewpoint reminiscent of the isometric view of Diablo III's predecessors. The inventory has sixty slots for items. Armor and weaponry each occupy two slots and all other items each occupy one slot. It can also be expanded to include details about the character's attributes.

Diablo III's skills window, depicting the abilities of the wizard class

=== Hardcore mode ===
Diablo III gives players the choice to make hardcore characters. Originally, players are required to first level up a regular character to level 10 before they have the option to create new Hardcore characters. Hardcore characters cannot be resurrected; instead they become permanently unplayable if they are killed. Hardcore characters are separately ranked, and they can only form teams with other hardcore characters. After dying, the ghost of a hardcore character can still chat. Their name still shows up in rankings, but the character cannot return to the game. If the hardcore character reached level 10 before dying, it can be placed in the Hall of Fallen Heroes.

=== Artisans ===
Artisans are non-player characters (NPCs) who sell and craft items. Two types of artisans can be introduced by completing a quest for each: Haedrig Eamon the Blacksmith and Covetous Shen the Jeweler. The Reaper of Souls expansion introduced the Mystic artisan, who can replace individual item enchantments and change the physical appearance of items. Artisans create items using materials the player can gather by scrapping acquired items and reducing them to their component parts. These materials are used to create items with random bonuses. Unlike in Diablo II, rare and magic items can also be enhanced rather than just basic weaponry and armor. Crafting can be used to train and improve the skills of the artisans rather than create new items. When artisans gain new levels, their shop reflects their higher skill level. The process of salvaging items into materials also makes inventory management easier. Blizzard stated that this crafting system was designed so that it would not slow down the pace of the game.

=== Followers ===
Followers are NPC allies that can accompany the player throughout the game world. There are three followers in Diablo III: Kormac the Templar, Lyndon the Scoundrel and Eirena the Enchantress, who each possess their own skills and background. As followers fight alongside the player, they gain new experience, skills, and equipment as they level up. Only one follower accompanies the player at a time, creating a gameplay strategy decision. Originally, followers were only going to appear in Normal mode; however, Jay Wilson stated at BlizzCon 2011 that followers would continue to be usable in later difficulty levels.

=== Auction house ===
On August 1, 2011, it was reported that Diablo III would feature two types of auction houses: one where players spend in-game gold and another where players could buy or sell virtual items for real-world money. The real-money auction house was not available in Hardcore mode. Prior to release, Blizzard stated that nearly everything that drops on the ground, including gold, could be traded with other players either directly or through the auction house system. Aside from certain bound on account items, such as the Staff of Herding needed to access the Whimsyshire easter egg, Blizzard stated there would be very few items that would be bound to a particular character and therefore untradable.

In order to get rated in South Korea, Blizzard had to remove the real-money auction house from the Korean release of the game as the auction house violated Korean anti-gambling laws.

In the gold-based auction house, a flat fee of 15 percent was taken from the final sale price of an auction. The real-money auction house fees were US$1, €1 or £1 (or equivalent) for equipment (weapons and armor) and a 15 percent fee for commodity auctions, which included items like crafting materials, blacksmith and jewelcrafting plans, and gold exchange. There was an additional 15 percent "cashing-out" fee from proceeds gained selling items in the real-money auction house. While the gold-based auction house was available to any player regardless of which region they play in, the real-money auction was restricted to players on their home region. If they used the global play function to play in a different region, they would not be able to access the real-money auction house. The real money auction house was opened on June 12, 2012 (June 15 in the Americas).

In March 2013, former Diablo III game director Jay Wilson stated that he felt the existence of the auction houses "really hurt" the game. "I think we would turn it off if we could," Wilson said during his talk. But the solution is "not as easy as that". On September 17, 2013, Blizzard stated that both the gold and real-money auction houses would be shut down on March 18, 2014. Players had until June 24, 2014, to claim gold and items from the completed tab on the auction house interface.

During a panel discussion at the Portland Retro Gaming Expo in 2022, Jay Wilson stated that the delay in shutting down the auction houses was due to legal issues that could potentially follow, since the feature was being advertised on the retail packaging of the game. According to Wilson, the company "took a long time to try and work out all the legal issues" prior to removing the auction houses from the game.

=== Player versus player combat ===
Player versus player combat (PvP) was added to Diablo III in a limited form with the 1.0.7 patch in February 2013. The Brawling system provides a free for all area where between two and four characters can fight and defeat each other as long as they like, but without any scores or damage being tracked. Players can participate by choosing from their existing characters, with access to all of the gear and skill they have gathered from playing the game in single-player or cooperative mode.

PvP content for Diablo III had been discussed throughout the game's development, but on March 9, 2012, Blizzard announced that PvP had been delayed and would not be included with the game's release. Lead designer Jay Wilson said in a post on Battle.net that the PvP Arena system would arrive in a post-release patch; it would include multiple Arena maps with themed locations and layouts, PvP-centric achievements, and a quick and easy matchmaking system.

On December 27, 2012, Blizzard announced that the Arena mode was canceled, because it did not have enough depth. Instead a simple PvP system would be added for the time being. That PvP mode was initially named Dueling, and was renamed to Brawling before release. Although the PvP systems initially outlined were not released, Blizzard stated that they would add other full-featured PvP systems in a free future content patch. In a May 2013 interview, Diablo III developer Wyatt Cheng stated that the development team was looking to see how the Brawling PvP evolves, while they "continue to work on figuring out something more objective-based."

=== Character classes ===
There are five available character classes from Diablo III, one more from the Reaper of Souls expansion, and another from the Rise of the Necromancer DLC pack (which requires Reaper of Souls) for a total of seven character classes. In Diablo III players may choose the gender, in contrast to the previous two games where each class had a fixed gender.

- The Barbarian (voiced by Dorian Harewood and Athena Karkanis) was initially the only returning class from Diablo II, and according to Jay Wilson the original backstory (since discarded) envisioned the male as the same character from Diablo II but now 20 years older. Barbarians have a variety of revamped skills at their disposal based on incredible physical prowess. The barbarian is able to whirlwind through crowds, cleave through swarms, leap across crags - crushing opponents upon landing - and grapple-snap enemies into melee range. The resource used by the barbarian is fury, which is generated through attacking enemies, getting attacked by enemies, and using certain abilities. Fury is used for the barbarian's strongest abilities and degenerates over time.
- The Demon Hunter (voiced by Robin Atkin Downes and Anna Graves, Laura Bailey in Diablo III: Reaper of Souls) combines elements of Diablo II's amazon and assassin classes. Demon hunters use bows and crossbows as their main weapons and can also throw small bombs and knives at enemies. The demon hunter is fueled by both discipline and hatred: hatred is a fast regenerating resource that is used for attacks, while discipline is a slow regenerating resource used for defensive abilities involving acrobatics or shadows.
- The Monk (voiced by Jamieson Price and Rajia Baroudi) is a melee attacker, using martial arts to cripple foes, resist damage, deflect projectiles, attack with blinding speed, and land explosive killing blows. Monk gameplay combines the melee elements of Diablo II's assassin class with the "holy warrior" role of the paladin. Blizzard has stated that the monk is not related in any way to the monk class from the Sierra Entertainment–made Diablo: Hellfire expansion. The monk is fueled by spirit, which has defensive purposes and is slowly generated through attacking, though it does not degenerate.
- The Witch Doctor (voiced by Carl Lumbly and Erica Luttrell) is a new character reminiscent of the Diablo II's necromancer, but with skills more traditionally associated with shamanism and voodoo culture. The witch doctor has the ability to summon monsters, cast curses, harvest souls, and hurl poisons and explosives at their enemies. To power spells the witch doctor uses mana, a vast pool of mental power which regenerates slowly.
- The Wizard (voiced by Crispin Freeman and Grey DeLisle) succeeds the sorceress from Diablo II and the sorcerer from Diablo. The initial backstory for the female wizard described her as a rebellious sorceress who could not be tamed. The wizard's abilities range from shooting lightning, fire and ice at their enemies to slowing time and teleporting past enemies and through walls. Wizards fuel their spells with arcane power, which is a shallow but fast-regenerating power source.
- The Crusader (voiced by Gideon Emery and Mary Elizabeth McGlynn) is a Reaper of Souls expansion character and is similar to the Paladin from Diablo II; in the backstory these two classes plus the Templar make up the three military orders of the Church of Zakarum. The crusader has a variety of combat skills at its disposal based on physical prowess, and typically wields a shield and an associated weapon (typically a flail). The crusader has an eclectic mix of abilities, including movement abilities to move into the thick of battle, close-quarters attacks that dispose of many nearby enemies, and many more. The resource used by the crusader is wrath, which is generated through attacking enemies, getting attacked by enemies, and using certain abilities.
- The Necromancer (voiced by Ioan Gruffudd and Eliza Jane Schneider) is a death-themed spellcaster, available as downloadable content for Reaper of Souls. Described as a "reimagining" of the previous incarnation seen in Diablo II, the necromancer specializes in controlling the dead, be it by summoning minions, reviving dead enemies temporarily or using their corpses as a medium to their magical powers, while using blood magic to power their offensive and defensive abilities. While the Diablo II necromancer spells could summon a minion for every corpse potentially enabling them to raise a large army (which was infamous for lagging performance), Diablo III's necromancer summoning spells have much lower maximum numbers of minions. The resource used by the necromancer is essence, which is generated through attacking enemies with their primary skills. Compared to the other summoning class, while the witch doctor's lighthearted "creepy crawlies" summons of spiders and snakes, the necromancer has a "grim, visceral and dark" design around blood, bone and corpses.

The Archivist class was presented on April 1, 2009, following in Blizzard's April Fool's Day joke tradition.

== Plot ==
The game takes place in Sanctuary, the dark fantasy world of the Diablo series, twenty years after the events of Diablo II. Deckard Cain and his ward Leah are in Tristram Cathedral (the same cathedral that was the setting of Diablo) investigating ancient texts regarding an ominous prophecy. A mysterious star falling from the sky strikes the cathedral, creating a deep crater into which Deckard Cain disappears.

Act I

The Nephalem (the player's character) arrives in the town of New Tristram to investigate the fallen star. They accompany Leah to the cathedral in order to rescue Cain. After rescuing him, they learn that the only way to the fallen star is to defeat the Skeleton King (who was once called King Leoric). The Nephalem defeats him and finds a stranger where the fallen star landed. The stranger's only memory is of a sword that shattered into three pieces as he fell.

The Nephalem recovers two of the sword pieces. But Maghda, leader of the Dark Coven, recovers the third piece, and tries to make Cain repair the sword. Leah, however, kills the cultists with a surge of magical power, forcing Maghda to attack Cain fatally and flee with the stranger. Before dying, Cain repairs the sword and discovers it to be of angelic origin, and tasks the Nephalem with returning it to the stranger. After freeing the stranger from the Butcher in the dungeons beneath Leoric's manor and returning the sword, the stranger's memories are recovered, and it is revealed that he is the Archangel Tyrael, the Aspect of Justice. Disgusted with his fellow angels' unwillingness to protect humanity from the forces of Hell, Tyrael cast aside his divinity to become a mortal and warn Sanctuary about the arrival of the demon lords.

Act II

The Nephalem, Leah, and Tyrael travel to the city of Caldeum. The Nephalem leaves to track down Maghda. At the Khasim Outpost, demons in service to Belial, the Lord of Lies, have imprisoned and replaced the guards. When the Nephalem freed them, they reclaim the outpost and the Nephalem is given access to Alcarnus, then fights and kills Maghda. The Nephalem then returns to Caldeum to rescue Leah from Belial's forces, disguised as the guards of the young Emperor Hakan II, after which they escape into the city sewers. Leah reveals that her mother, Adria (the witch of Tristram from the original game), is still alive. The Nephalem aids Leah in rescuing Adria from her imprisonment in the sewers.

Adria reveals that the key to stopping the forces of Hell is the Black Soulstone, crafted by the renegade Horadrim Zoltan Kulle, which has the power to trap the souls of all seven of the Lords of Hell. Leah explains that Kulle was slain before he could complete the stone, and that his severed head was sealed away. Adria instructs the Nephalem to find the head. After the head is retrieved, Leah revives the ghost of Zoltun Kulle, who agrees to deliver the Black Soulstone if the Nephalem helps him restore his body. After the Nephalem finds his body, Leah brings Kulle back to life. The Nephalem is then led into the archive's inner sanctum where the Black Soulstone is located, but is forced to defeat Kulle when he tells the Nephalem to abandon his quest. Upon returning to Caldeum, the Nephalem finds the city under attack by Belial's forces. Leah and Adria fight their way to the palace with the Nephalem, revealing Belial as having taken the form of the Emperor to deceive them, and defeat him. Leah then traps Belial's soul within the Black Soulstone, freeing Caldeum, after which she has a vision of Azmodan, the Lord of Sin and now sole remaining Lord of Hell, who is invading Sanctuary from the crater of Mount Arreat (destroyed by Tyrael in Diablo II: Lord of Destruction).

Act III

The Nephalem travels to Bastion's Keep with Tyrael, their followers, Leah and Adria only to find it under attack by Azmodan's army. Tyrael instructs the Nephalem to aid the defenders. With that done, the Nephalem enters the stronghold, where Azmodan's forces have breached the lower levels, defeating the demon Ghom, the Lord of Gluttony. The Nephalem then destroys Azmodan's siege weapons before traversing the crater of Arreat, defeating Azmodan's consort Cydaea, the Maiden of Lust, before finally defeating Azmodan within the mountain's shattered core. Leah seals Azmodan's soul within the Black Soulstone. They return to Bastion's Keep, but find that Adria has betrayed them. Adria reveals she has been serving Diablo, the Lord of Terror, from the beginning. Adria uses the Black Soulstone to resurrect Diablo while forcing Leah to serve as his vessel. With all the souls of the Lords of Hell now within him, Diablo becomes the Prime Evil, and begins an assault on the High Heavens.

Act IV

The Nephalem and Tyrael arrive at the High Heavens to find that it is already under attack. Imperius, the Aspect of Valor, blames the Nephalem and Tyrael for their downfall, causing Tyrael to give in to despair. However, the Nephalem remains determined to fight. The Nephalem meets Itherael, the Aspect of Fate, who instructs the Nephalem to rescue Auriel, the Aspect of Hope. Returning hope to the forces of Heaven, the Nephalem is then instructed by Auriel to close the Hell Rifts. After this is done, the Nephalem finds Tyrael, who has overcome his despair. Together, they attempt to stop Diablo from reaching the Crystal Arch, the source of Heaven's power, but not before a brawl with Izual, Tyrael's corrupted former lieutenant (thought to have been killed in Diablo II). Diablo is eventually defeated and his physical manifestation is destroyed. The Black Soulstone is shown falling from the High Heavens, still intact. After the battle, Tyrael decides to rejoin the Angiris Council as the new Aspect of Wisdom, but remains a mortal, dedicated to building a permanent alliance between angels and humans.

The story continues in Act V, in the expansion Diablo III: Reaper of Souls.

== Development ==
Development on Diablo III began in 2001 when Blizzard North was still in operation, and the game was announced on June 28, 2008, at the Blizzard Worldwide Invitational in Paris, France. The original artistic design differed from that shown at Blizzard Worldwide Invitational 2008 demonstration, and had undergone three revisions before reaching the standards felt necessary by the team behind Diablo III. It was announced that the game would be simultaneously released on both Windows and macOS platforms, and would require a constant internet connection to play, even for single-player mode.

The proprietary engine incorporates Blizzard's custom in-house physics, a change from the original usage of Havok's physics engine, and features destructible environments with an in-game damage effect.

Diablo III's lead designer was Jay Wilson, a former Relic Entertainment designer credited with work on Warhammer 40,000: Dawn of War and Company of Heroes, as well as Blood II: The Chosen for Monolith Productions. The lead world designer was Leonard Boyarsky, one of the six co-creators of Fallout.

On May 9, 2011, Blizzard announced that the game was expected to be released for external beta testing in Q3 of 2011. On September 7, 2011, Blizzard community manager Bashiok confirmed the start of the closed public beta test of the game with limited external testing by employees and their families. Testers were not restricted by a non-disclosure agreement. The open beta began on April 20, 2012, and closed on May 1, 2012. Following the beta, the game released for Windows and OS X on May 15, 2012.

=== Updates ===
On June 11, 2012, it was announced at the 2012 Apple Worldwide Developers Conference keynote that native retina display support would be coming to Diablo III. The following day, a Blizzard representative confirmed via the Battle.net forums Apple's statement, the ongoing work by the developer on the optimization of the game engine for its rendering on the Retina display (and technically on other similar future high-density monitors) and that this optimization was mainly for aesthetic purposes.

Patch 1.0.4 introduced the paragon leveling system. After reaching the level cap of 60, characters continue to accumulate experience points, gaining paragon levels (up to a cap of 100), each of which provides a bonus to core stats (making characters more powerful and durable) and magic find and gold find (increasing the quantity and average quality of loot drops). Patch 1.0.5 expanded the difficulty settings with the addition of the Monster Power system. In addition to the Normal/Nightmare/Hell/Inferno difficulty system, players can also set Monster Power at any level from 0 to 10, with each level of Monster Power increasing the damage, health points, experience point yield and loot drop rates beyond the base value for a given difficulty tier. The first PvP addition to the game was in February 2013, as part of patch 1.0.7; a simple free-for-all system called "Brawling" and multiple item crafting options.

For Diablo's 20th anniversary, it was announced during BlizzCon 2016 that Diablo III would receive a free patch called The Darkening of Tristram that would recreate the original game. The patch contained a 16-level dungeon, four main bosses from the 1996 version and special graphics filters and 8-directions limited movement like the original game. The patch released on November 4, 2016.

=== Console development ===
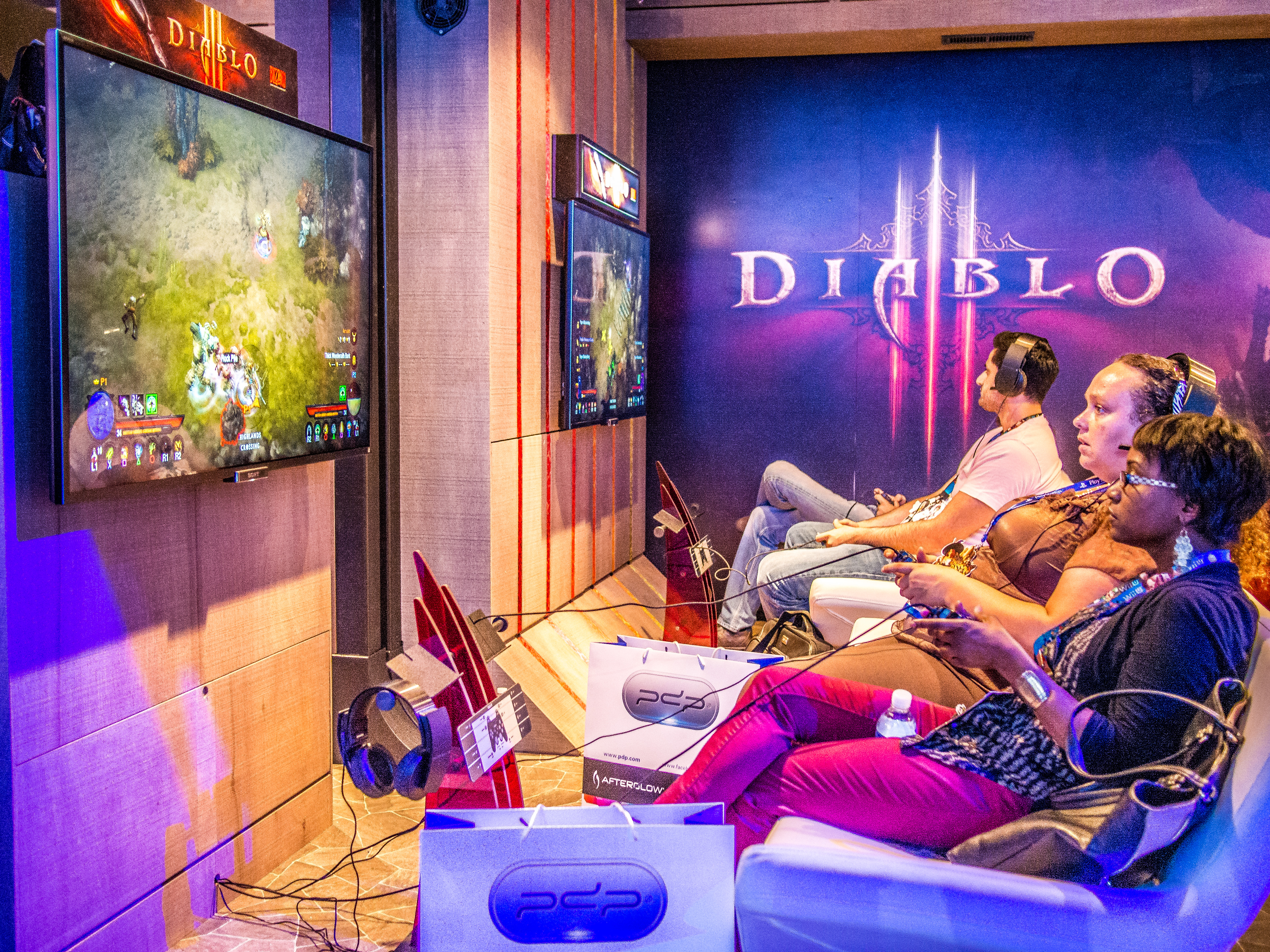
2013 event

On January 10, 2012, Blizzard community manager Bashiok tweeted "Yup. Josh Mosqueira is lead designer for the Diablo III console project" however a Blizzard spokesperson later clarified that Bashiok's tweet was only "intended as a confirmation that Blizzard is actively exploring the possibility of developing a console version of Diablo III", adding, "This is not a confirmation that Diablo III is coming to any console platform."

At Sony's Press Conference on February 20, 2013, Chris Metzen announced that Diablo III would be released on both PlayStation 3 and PlayStation 4. Activision Blizzard stated in their first-quarter 2013 earnings report, that the PlayStation 3 version of Diablo III would be released in 2013. On June 6, 2013, Blizzard announced that both the PlayStation 3 and Xbox 360 port of the game would be released on September 3, 2013. A PS3 version of the game was published and localized by Square Enix in Japan, released there on January 30, 2014.

In August 2013, Diablo III developers stated that they had started on the PlayStation 4 development of the game, titled Diablo III: Ultimate Evil Edition, and were looking at how to best utilize the new features of the PS4 controller, such as the TouchPad and the Share button. In May 2014, Blizzard announced that Diablo III: Ultimate Evil Edition would be released on August 19, bringing the game to the PlayStation 4, Xbox One, PlayStation 3, and Xbox 360. The game runs at a display resolution of 1080p on the PlayStation 4 and Xbox One.

On June 27, 2017, Diablo III: Eternal Collection, which includes all content from previous expansions, was released for PlayStation 4 and Xbox One. It was released for the Nintendo Switch as well, which included exclusive content based on Nintendo's The Legend of Zelda series and features Amiibo support.

=== Music ===
Russell Brower wrote the original score for the game, with additional music being composed by Derek Duke, Glenn Stafford, Joseph Lawrence, Neal Acree, Laurence Juber, and Edo Guidotti. When composing for the orchestra, Brower tried to respect the Wagnerian style from the expansion to the second game in the series, Lord of Destruction. The Overture is considered the main theme of the game and it has been performed by the Eminence Symphony Orchestra, and was released on iTunes in 2009, as a single. A similar composition was used in the cinematic teaser trailer of the game. The Tristram theme from the first Diablo, also used in Diablo II, is present in Diablo III with some changes.. Irish choral ensemble Anúna feature on the soundtrack. A full soundtrack was released on iTunes on May 15, 2012, the same day as the game, as well as on CD as part of the Collector's Edition of the game.

== Marketing and release ==
Starting at BlizzCon in October 2011, Blizzard offered an "annual pass" for World of Warcraft, where players who signed up for a 12-month subscription to that game received a free digital copy of Diablo III once released, as well as guaranteed beta access for the Mists of Pandaria expansion to World of Warcraft and a special Diablo-inspired mount called Tyrael's Charger in World of Warcraft.

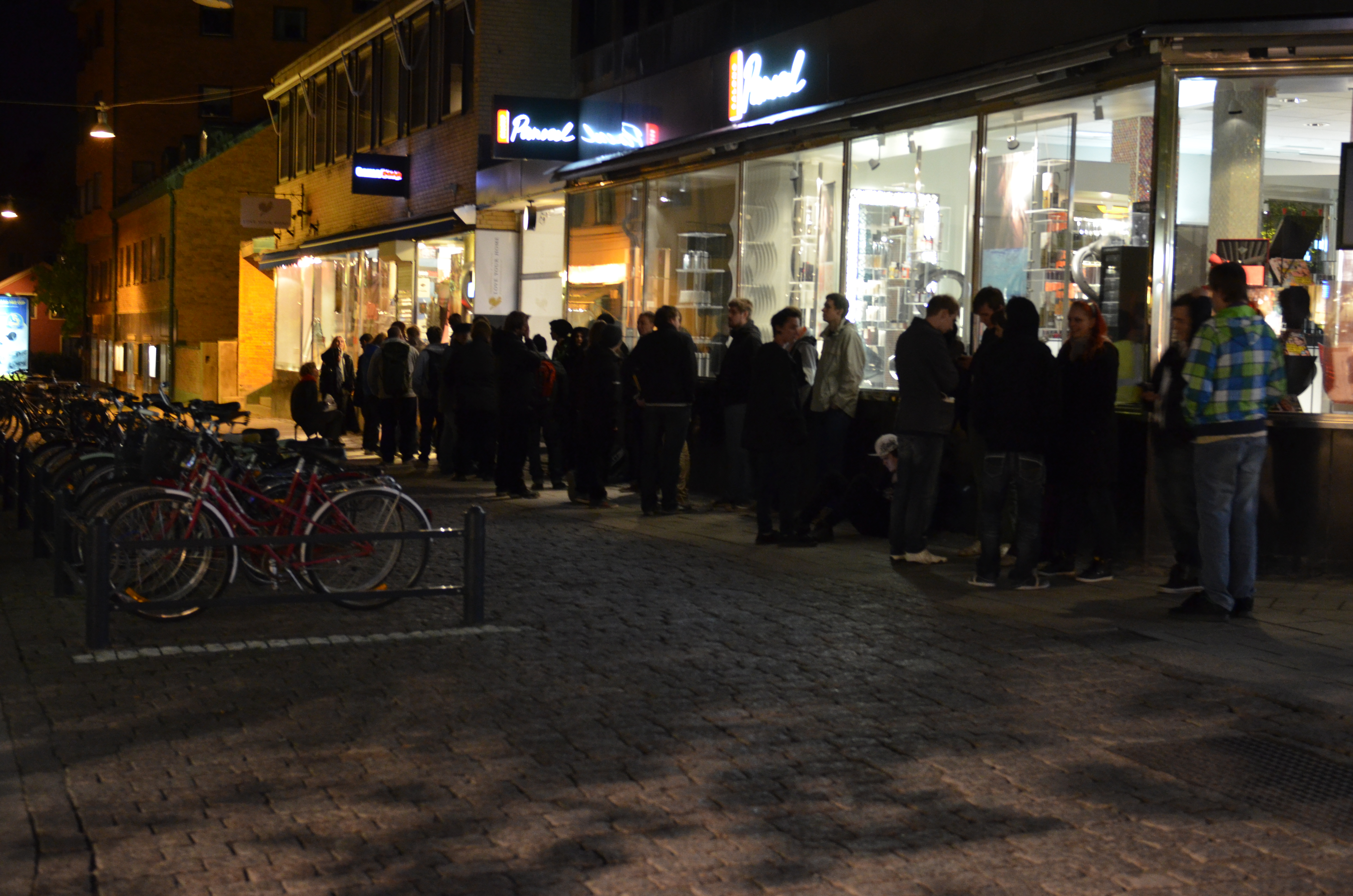
People queuing for the release in Uppsala, Sweden

Diablo III was released on May 15, 2012. Players had the options to buy one of two retail boxed versions, a standard edition and collector's edition, or could pre-order directly from Battle.net and download the installer in advance. On May 14, 2012, players who bought the downloadable version from Battle.net could install the rest of the game including patches. On May 15, 2012, the retail version could be bought from stores doing midnight launches such as GameStop. The Diablo III Battle.net servers went live at this point, people who downloaded the game could begin playing. Initially the launches were hindered by heavy server load with many users getting various errors, including the error 37 which reads; "The servers are busy at this time. Please try again later". These issues made the game unplayable for those affected, while some others experienced in-game bugs. Connection errors continued throughout May 2012, but as Blizzard added servers and the population of players leveled out, the problems were largely resolved. The "always online" nature of the PC release meant that players with bad connections would still experience issues, however.

The release was the source of a minor controversy in Australia when retailer Game went into voluntary administration the day before the release, and so was unable to honor pre-orders or offer refunds. In response to this, Blizzard Entertainment offered affected customers credit in purchasing the digital version of the game.

On April 23, 2015, the game was released in China as it was approved by the Ministry of Culture. It used to be sold under the name "Big Pineapple" (大菠萝 Da Boluo) which sounds similar to Diablo in Mandarin Chinese in order to dodge the sales ban.

=== Starter Edition ===
A demo version of the game, called the Starter Edition, was released simultaneously with the full release. It provides a limited introduction to the game where players can complete Act 1 up to the Skeleton King boss encounter with a level cap of 13. Originally after Diablo III's release the Starter Edition was only available through a guest pass code, which was included with the boxed versions of the game. Players have the option to upgrade to the full game through their Battle.net accounts. The Starter Edition became available to all users a few months after release on August 14, 2012.

=== Reaper of Souls ===
At Gamescom 2013, Diablo III: Reaper of Souls was announced as the first expansion pack for the game. It features the fallen angel of wisdom Malthael as the expansion's main villain and is set in the city of Westmarch, which takes inspiration from many Gothic medieval locations. The expansion includes a new hero called the Crusader, an increased level cap to level 70, major improvements to loot drops including the ability to change item stats using an enchanting system, the ability to change the look of an item using transmogrification, and an improved Paragon leveling system which is account-wide and does not have a level cap. Reaper of Souls was released on March 25, 2014, for the Windows and macOS versions of Diablo III. The expansion pack content was released as part of the Diablo III: Ultimate Evil Edition version for consoles on August 19 for the PlayStation 4, Xbox One, PlayStation 3, and Xbox 360. That edition expanded the base Diablo III game on the PlayStation 3 and Xbox 360, and brought the game for the first time to the PlayStation 4 and Xbox One. A second expansion was being worked on at the time of Reaper of Souls' release, but was later abandoned by Blizzard with the developers predominantly moving over to World of Warcraft.

=== Rise of the Necromancer ===
The Rise of the Necromancer pack was released for Windows, macOS, PlayStation 4 and Xbox One in June 2017.

== Reception ==
=== Critical reception ===
Reception

Aggregate score
Aggregator	Score
Metacritic	PC: 88/100; PS3: 86/100; X360: 87/100; PS4: 90/100; XONE: 86/100; NS: 88/100

Review scores
Publication	Score
Edge	9/10
Eurogamer	9/10
G4	4.5/5
Game Informer	9/10
GameSpot	8.5/10
GameSpy	4/5
GamesRadar+	8/10
IGN	9.5/10
PC Gamer (UK)	90/100
Polygon	10/10

Diablo III received "generally positive reviews" from critics, according to review aggregator Metacritic.

GamesRadar+ was positive about the game's opening act and its nods to past Diablo games saying "we liked what we saw". IGN was positive about the new skill system stating "Instead of gameplay like Diablo II, where I often regretted how I allotted my ability points, Diablo III encourages experimentation and finding out exactly what works for your play-style. It's a vastly superior way to handle character abilities", and praised the overall gameplay, stating "the new systems really do make it a lot easier to enjoy Diablo III". IGN further praised the game's new gameplay design, in particular the rune and loot systems, the randomly generated levels and the game's enjoyable unpredictability. It stated the game's feel is quite intuitive and also praised the game's sound and voicing.

Rock, Paper, Shotgun gave mixed commentary during the game's beta period, praising the actual game itself by stating that it is much more direct than its predecessors and intuitive in its interface. However, it said the playing experience is spoiled due to lag in single-player mode caused by a lack of an offline single-player mode. Following the game's release, it reaffirmed its displeasure at the always-online DRM and offered a mixed opinion that the game was enjoyable but added "nothing new" to its genre.

Users have voiced criticism about the game's strong digital rights management which requires what is known as persistent online authentication, resulting in the lack of an offline single-player mode. Erik Kain, a Forbes contributing writer, stated that the requirement to remain online is not necessary for single-player mode and that Blizzard is abusing its position as a "juggernaut" and is setting a worrying precedent for the gaming industry. In response to questions about the lack of offline single-player, Diablo III senior producer Alex Mayberry said, "Obviously StarCraft II did it, World of Warcraft authenticates also. It's kind of the way things are, these days. The world of gaming is not the same as it was when Diablo II came out."

Gaming Blend supported the game's fanbase (referring to the user ratings on Metacritic and Amazon) and rejected counter-criticisms of the community. It claims that the gaming industry at large is far too defensive of production companies' actions, to the point of accepting backward steps in game availability. William Usher, the article's author said, "Journalists should have been acknowledging consumer distaste rather than fueling it with pro-corporate pandering." While Gaming Blend disliked the always-online DRM, it did give the game a positive review. It stated the game includes interesting opportunities for experimentation and has great appeal for replaying over and over. The review concluded the game is "smooth and entertaining". A GameArena critic questioned how Blizzard managed to "fail so spectacularly at creating reliable networking for Diablo 3" before going on to point out the lack of competitive multiplayer.

Many users criticized the art direction as it was considered too bright and colourful in contrast to the darker atmosphere of the previous releases. This led to petitions demanding Blizzard to change the design. The lead producer Keith Lee responded to these criticisms and explaining the design choices by stating that "We feel that color actually helps to create a lot of highlights in the game so that there is contrast." He also highlighted that unlike the previous games, the players explore outdoors. An easter egg called "Whimsyshire" (a.k.a. Pony Level), featuring cartoon-like graphics, was included as a joke aimed at those who disapproved the game's design.

The Black Soulstone footage won the 'Outstanding Visual Effects in an Animated Commercial or Video Game Trailer' award from the Visual Effects Society. The Switch version was nominated for the Freedom Tower Award for Best Remake at the New York Game Awards 2019.

During the 16th Annual D.I.C.E. Awards, the 2012 PC release of Diablo III received nominations for "Role-Playing/Massively Multiplayer Game of the Year", and outstanding achievement in "Online Gameplay", "Original Music Composition", and "Sound Design". A year later at the 17th Annual D.I.C.E. Awards, the 2013 console version of Diablo III won the award outright for "Role-Playing/Massively Multiplayer Game of the Year", along with a nomination for "Online Game of the Year".

=== Sales ===
Before its release, Diablo III broke several presale records and became the most pre-ordered PC game to date on Amazon. Activision Blizzard reported that Diablo III had broken the one-day PC sales records, accumulating over 3.5 million sales in the first 24 hours after release and over 6.3 million sales in its first week, including the 1.2 million people who obtained Diablo III through the World of Warcraft annual pass. On its first day, the game amassed 4.7 million players worldwide, an estimate which includes those who obtained the game via the World of Warcraft annual pass. In its 2012 second quarter report, Diablo III was reported to have pushed Activision Blizzard's expectations and as of July 2012, more than 10 million people had played the game. Diablo III remains the fastest selling PC game to date, and also one of the best-selling PC video games. As of the end of 2012, it had sold more than 12 million copies, and as of March 2013, Blizzard stated that Diablo III had around 1 million daily players, with 3 million unique players each month. By May 2013, Diablo III had been played by 14.5 million unique players. and had sold over 30 million copies worldwide by August 2015.

== Controversies ==
=== South Korea ===
On May 28, 2012, Blizzard Entertainment's offices in South Korea were raided by the Fair Trade Commission amid allegations that the company had breached consumer rights laws, including suspected violations of Korea's law on electronic commerce and commercial contracts. Players in Korea requested refunds from Blizzard based on their inability to play Diablo III, but Blizzard cited the terms of sale and refused to grant these requests. Hundreds of gamers filed formal complaints with the FTC, and in June 2012 Blizzard started offering players full refunds.

=== France ===
On June 15, 2012, French consumers group UFC Que Choisir announced that it had received 1,500 complaints in four days regarding connectivity issues with Diablo III. As a result of this, the organization asked Blizzard Entertainment to provide a permanent solution by June 30, 2012, and to "communicate completely and transparently about problems encountered in due time". They also requested that gamers be given reimbursement for any troubles they may have encountered. In addition, they asked the French government to take a closer look at games with online-only DRM. On June 28, Blizzard replied to the Que Choisir that the box for Diablo III clearly labelled that a high-speed internet connection was required and that most of the stability issues had been fixed.

=== Germany ===
The German Federation of Consumer Organizations threatened legal action if Blizzard did not respond to complaints about Diablo III's lack of clear information on the German version of the box by July 27, 2012, regarding the always-online requirement and lack of ability to resell the digital game.
