= Ryan Amon =

- Born: April 19, 1980 (age 46); Elkhorn, Wisconsin, United States
- Genres: Film music, electronic music, orchestral music
- Occupations: Composer, musician
- Instruments: Piano, saxophone
- Years active: 2003–present
- Website: www.ryanamon.com

Ryan Amon is an American composer known for his work in films, television, advertising, and video games. He composed the soundtrack of the movie Elysium (2013). His music often blends orchestral writing with electronic elements and world‑music influences.

== Early life and education ==
Ryan Amon was born in Elkhorn, Wisconsin, United States, where he began composing music at an early age and studied classical piano and saxophone. He later attended the McNally Smith College of Music in St. Paul, Minnesota, focusing on songwriting, composition, and motion‑picture scoring.

== Television and early career ==
After receiving the BMI Pete Carpenter Fellowship in 2003, Amon studied television music under composer Mike Post and subsequently relocated to Los Angeles. In Los Angeles he became an additional music or ghost‑music composer for more than 70 television programs, including reality and competition series such as Shark Tank, The Biggest Loser, American Idol, America's Got Talent, Dancing with the Stars, and American Ninja Warrior.

Under the alias “City of the Fallen,” Amon also produced production and trailer music for film marketing, including custom work for the international trailer of The Avengers.

== Feature films ==
In 2011 Amon was approached by South African director Neill Blomkamp to compose the score for the dystopian science‑fiction film Elysium (2013), starring Matt Damon. The score combines orchestral writing with experimental sounds, including recordings of colobus monkeys, baboons, mosquitos, and Tuvan throat singing. The orchestral parts were recorded with the London Philharmonia Orchestra at Abbey Road Studios.

In 2014 American director Michael Mann enlisted Amon to compose parts of the score for the cyber‑thriller film Blackhat, working alongside composers Atticus Ross and Harry Gregson‑Williams. The score mixes organic synthesis with live performances from musicians based in Bratislava, Slovakia.

== Video games and other media ==
Amon has contributed to several major video‑game franchises. He co‑composed the score for FromSoftware's gothic‑Victorian action role‑playing game Bloodborne (2015), recorded at AIR Studios in London. A suite of themes from Bloodborne received its world‑premiere live concert performance in Stockholm, Sweden, in the fall of 2015.

He also co‑composed the score for Ubisoft's Assassin's Creed Unity (2014), working alongside Cris Velasco and Sarah Schachner. His credits additionally include contributions to Blizzard Entertainment's Diablo IV and other interactive‑media projects.
