= Diablo III: Reaper of Souls =

Expansion pack for the action role-playing video game Diablo III

- Cover art featuring Malthael
- Developer: Blizzard Entertainment
- Publisher: Blizzard Entertainment
- Director: Josh Mosqueira
- Producers: John Hight; Alex Mayberry
- Designer: Kevin Martens
- Programmer: Jason Regier
- Artist: Christian Lichtner
- Writers: Brian Kindregan; Chris Metzen
- Composer: Derek Duke
- Series: Diablo
- Platforms: macOS; Windows; Nintendo Switch; PlayStation 3; PlayStation 4; Xbox 360; Xbox One
- Release: macOS, Windows: WW: March 25, 2014; PS3, PS4, X360, XOne: WW: August 19, 2014; Nintendo Switch: WW: November 2, 2018
- Genres: Action role-playing, hack and slash
- Modes: Single-player, multiplayer

Diablo III: Reaper of Souls is an expansion pack for the action role-playing video game Diablo III. It was revealed at Gamescom 2013. It was released for the PC and Mac versions of Diablo III on March 25, 2014. The expansion pack content was released as part of the Diablo III: Ultimate Evil Edition version for consoles on August 19 for the PlayStation 4, Xbox One, PlayStation 3, and Xbox 360. That edition expanded the base Diablo III game on the PlayStation 3 and Xbox 360, and brought the game for the first time to the PlayStation 4 and Xbox One.

In August 2018, it was announced it would be coming for Nintendo Switch and it was released in November 2018 with exclusive content.

== Plot ==
After Diablo is defeated by the Nephalem (the player character), Tyrael recovers the Black Soulstone that contains the essence of all seven of the Great Evils. Knowing it is too dangerous to leave in the hands of mortals or angels, he and six Horadrim take the Black Soulstone back to Sanctuary and attempt to seal it away where it can never be found - deep in the tomb of Rakkis, the first King of Westmarch, the kingdom established to the west of Khanduras. However, the group is ambushed by Malthael, former Archangel of Wisdom and member and leader of the Angiris Council, who had disappeared after the destruction of the Worldstone after it was corrupted by Baal twenty years earlier (at the end of Diablo II: Lord of Destruction). Now calling himself the "Angel of Death", Malthael kills all but one of the Horadrim, incapacitates Tyrael in the process and steals the Black Soulstone.

Tyrael sends the surviving Horadrim, Lorath Nahr, to locate the Nephalem. Nahr encounters the Nephalem outside Westmarch City, which has been overrun by the Reapers, Malthael's army of enslaved spirits and renegade angels. With the gates blocked, the Nephalem fights through the city sewers to the Zakarum cathedral in the city center, where they encounter Tyrael. Tyrael reveals that with Diablo gone, Malthael sees humanity as a race of demons based on their descent from the original Nephalem, the offspring of angels and demons; by wiping out humanity, Malthael hopes to end the Eternal Conflict, the long war between Heaven and Hell. A sliver broke off from the Black Soulstone when Malthael took it, and Tyrael attempts to use it to discover Malthael's plans. The Reapers deploy two soul crucibles into Westmarch City to claim the souls of the dead, and the Nephalem locates and destroys them, earning the ire of Urzael, Malthael's chief lieutenant, who awaits the hero in Westmarch Heights. The Nephalem tracks Urzael down to the Tower of Korelan and defeats him in a gruesome battle.

The Nephalem learns from Myriam Jahzia, a mystic rescued during the attack against the soul crucibles, that Adria (the witch of Tristram from the original game, who is revealed to have been a servant of Diablo in Diablo III) is in Westmarch seeking to locate the Black Soulstone and resurrect her master again. Lorath decides to accompany the hero, then learns that Adria sealed the tomb's entrance with a rock slide, so he suggests unlocking the guide-stones to open the correct passageway. Travelling into the ancient ruins in the Blood Marsh outside Westmarch, the Nephalem confronts Adria, who manages to locate Malthael at the Pandemonium Fortress (last seen in Diablo II), built in the realm between Heaven and Hell to watch over the Worldstone. She then transforms into a winged demonic creature, claiming that Diablo sent her a vision of his return at the hands of the Nephalem, after which the Nephalem slays her. Upon learning of Malthael's location, Tyrael takes the Nephalem back into the High Heavens, where they find the Pandemonium Gate under attack by Malthael's Reapers. Upon defeating the attackers, they are met by Imperius, Aspect of Valor and the commander of Heaven's armies, who reluctantly admits that Malthael must be stopped and leads the Nephalem into the Realm of Pandemonium. Imperius directs the Nephalem to use an ancient battering ram to breach the fortress gates, using siege runes held by the demons trapped there.

Tyrael arrives just as the Nephalem prepares to activate the ram, revealing that he has discovered Malthael's plan; he intends to use the Black Soulstone to consume all demonic essence in Sanctuary, including that which makes up the bloodline of humanity, leading to its extinction. After breaching the gates with four hits with the battering ram, Tyrael informs the Nephalem that they must become "one with death", as Malthael is, in order to defeat him. Inside the fortress, the Nephalem encounters a figure from their past (dependent on their class) who directs them to unlock the soul prison kept in its depths. The Nephalem channels the spirits from the prison and takes on an aspect of death themselves, before moving on to defeat the guardians that bar the way to Malthael's sanctum at the heart of the fortress.

The Nephalem holds their own against Malthael for a time, until he shatters the Black Soulstone and takes the power of the Seven Evils within himself. The Nephalem ultimately triumphs, striking down Malthael and saving mankind from his attempt to exterminate it; however, Malthael's death frees the Seven Evils, shattering the Black Soulstone; fulfilling Adria's final prophecy. As Tyrael and Imperius look on after the Nephalem's victory, Tyrael sees the Nephalem in a new light: a protector of the innocent who can confront the most powerful champions of Heaven and Hell alike. Yet in the end the Nephalem still has a mortal heart that can be corrupted, and Tyrael wonders if the Nephalem will remain the savior, or become the doom of all creation.

== Release ==
=== Pre-expansion patch ===
The pre-expansion Diablo III patch 2.0.1 deployed on February 25, 2014, one month before the release of Reaper of Souls. The patch updates the game for all owners of the base game, and does not require ownership of the expansion. The patch changed many game systems, including class skills, difficulty, and the number and quality of items acquired. One of the changes in the patch was a change to the paragon level system. Previously, paragon levels were separated between characters and were limited in number. With this patch, all the previous paragon experience was combined into an account wide paragon level that had no maximum. This allowed players to change between different characters and retain the bonuses between them, depending on the game mode being played.

The patch also made major changes to the game's item drop system. The change was referred to by developers as "Loot 2.0". Items would now drop in decreased quantity but increased quality, with a greater proportion of high bonuses and more useful properties. Instead of the mostly random item properties, items now found by a character would typically have properties that could be used by the character that found it. Many legendary items were changed to now provide playstyle and gameplay changing properties (a skill may become modified, changing its previous use, or gain new effects that are otherwise unobtainable). Previously bind-on-equip and tradeable pieces of equipment were made account-bound instead, with a limited amount of time to allow trading to other characters who were present in game when the item was dropped.

Patch 2.0.1 also streamlined crafting, condensing crafting materials into two categories: crafting items for the levels that comprise the original game, and materials for the expansion. Potions were also condensed into a single type of potion, where previously there were many different strengths and types. This patch added cursed chest and cursed shrine events. These timed events challenge players to fight off several sequential waves of attacking monsters, and provide rewards based on the player's success.

The patch also introduced Pools of Reflection. When used, the pools provide a cumulative experience point bonus (up to a maximum amount) which is lost on death, but otherwise lasts until the player earns a certain amount of experience.

The monster difficulty systems were also changed in patch 2.0.1. The Normal, Nightmare, Hell, and Inferno modes were removed, as well as the monster power system. The dynamic difficulty replacement system provides a new approach: monster levels automatically scale with the player's level, and the chosen difficulty setting affects how much tougher they are beyond that. The difficulties that can be chosen are Normal, Hard, Expert, Master, Torment I, Torment II, Torment III, and Torment IV, for a total of 8 difficulty levels. The higher difficulties can yield exclusive rewards, such as higher-quality gems, special legendary items, additional gold, and additional experience points.

=== Nintendo Switch version ===
Released on November 2, 2018, the Nintendo Switch version includes all expansion content to date as well as several new items. Up to four people can play together: either four players can play on a single screen, or four separate Switches can be used together using the internet. It can be played both offline and online.

== Features ==
Reaper of Souls adds a number of new features to the core gameplay of Diablo III. These include a new character class, the Crusader, who specializes in defensive play, large weapons (including newly introduced types like flails), specialized "Crusader shields", and holy magic. A fifth Act is added, which follows the Nephalem's quest through the remains of Westmarch and the Pandemonium Fortress to stop Malthael and his allies. In addition to the campaign, the expansion adds an "Adventure Mode", where players are free to roam the entire world and take on random Bounties and dungeons (called "Nephalem Rifts") at their leisure. A new artisan, the Mystic, can enhance the properties and appearance of the player's equipment. The expansion also raises the level cap to 70 (up from 60), and adds new skills, runes, and passive abilities for all characters, as well as a fourth slot for passive skills that unlocks when the character reaches level 70.

=== Seasons ===
Patch 2.1 introduced seasons to the game, which are the equivalent of ladders from Diablo II. In each season, players start with a new level 1 character and game performance is compared on a leaderboard. Each season has exclusive Legendary items, which will be awarded for good Ladder performance and through Tiered Rifts and each season includes Conquests, which are seasonal achievements for the first 1,000 to complete them on each server. Seasons last for around three months. When a season ends all seasonal characters are transferred to the main account together with all paragon experience earned with the seasonal characters.

=== Adventure Mode ===
Adventure Mode allows players to freely explore every region currently available in the game, without being restricted by the story. New objectives (including Bounties and Nephalem Rifts), areas and NPCs are also available to the players, and these features can only be found in Adventure Mode. Until patch 2.7.3, the mode was unlockable (and made available for all seasonal and non-seasonal characters on the player's account) only after completing the entire campaign (including Act V) once. However, as of patch 2.7.4, it will be automatically unlocked across all accounts and platforms.

==== Bounties ====
Players are able to complete five random Bounties for each act when playing in Adventure Mode. Bounties are random missions that may require players to hunt down a specific enemy, clear a specific area, slay a certain number of enemies, or complete a certain event, for example cleanse a cursed chest or a cursed shrine. Upon completion of Bounties, players will be rewarded with certain amount of gold, loots as well as crystalline blood shards, which can be traded for powerful items. Once players complete all five Bounties designated to one act, they will be rewarded with a Horadric Cache, which contains random loots and rewards such as gems, crafting materials, crafting recipes, and equipment. As of patch 2.3, Rift Key Fragments are no longer in the game, and thus have been removed from Horadric caches. Additional bounty areas were added with the Ruins of Sescheron in Act III (patch 2.3), Greyhollow Island in Act V (patch 2.4), the Shrouded Moors and the Temple of the Firstborn in Act II, and the Realms of Fate in Act IV (both patch 2.6).

==== Nephalem Rifts ====
Nephalem Rifts are dungeons in Adventure Mode that consist of randomized regions and encounters. Players fight enemies and explore areas drawn randomly from all acts. As of patch 2.3 Nephalem rifts can be opened for free and no longer require Rift Keystone Fragments (which have been removed from the game). Players will also find "pylons" that grant players powerful abilities during exploration of the Rifts. In the first major content patch Greater Rifts were added where the difficulty increases each time you complete the rift within the time limit. The final boss in each Nephalem Rift has a chance of dropping a Greater Rift Keystone, which can be used to open these Greater Rifts.

==== Kanai's Cube ====
Added in patch 2.3, Kanai's Cube is an improvement on the Horadric Cubes used in Diablo II. In Adventure Mode, players will speak to the ghost of Zoltun Kulle in town, at which point he will direct them to the Ruins of Sescheron in Act III to locate the cube. Once found, the cube is available to all characters of the type that finds it (normal or Hardcore; the first character in a new Season must re-acquire it regardless of whether their normal or Hardcore characters have already found it). With certain crafting material combinations, the cube can be used to extract legendary powers (marked in orange text in the item's stats), upgrade rare items to legendary, remove level requirements on items, and other abilities.

==== Mystic NPC ====
The Mystic is a new NPC featured in Diablo III: Reaper of Souls. The mystic serves two basic functions: Item Enchanting and Transmogrification. Item Enchanting allows players to “re-roll the dice”; players are free to re-roll one property on an item. The selected property can be re-rolled to a higher value or to another property. Transmogrification allows players to change their character's appearance for purely aesthetic purposes.

==== Kadala NPC ====
Kadala provides gambling services in the game's Adventure Mode. Blood Shards are used to purchase unidentified items from her. Most of the time these items will be magic or rare, with a low chance to roll a legendary or certain set items, regardless of difficulty or magic find. She does not sell items that are only found in Horadric Caches, but does sell Torment-exclusive items.

=== The Darkening of Tristram event ===
To commemorate the 20th anniversary of the original Diablo, Blizzard announced at BlizzCon on November 4, 2016, that they will add a remade version of the original game (complete with its 16-level dungeon and original bosses) to Diablo III; this will also include "retro touches" such as the option for the pixelated graphics and the eight-direction movement limitations of the original game, while being played with the Diablo III classes. The event, known as "the Darkening of Tristram", went live for the first time on January 4, 2017, and ran until January 31, and returned during the subsequent years.

=== Patch 2.5.0 highlights ===
Patch 2.5.0 brings many new highlights to the game, such as the armory system, crafting material storage, and seasons for consoles.

The armory system allows for you to store five different builds for each of your characters. Saving a build saves your complete current build to include skills, gear, gems, and Kanai's cube powers. Saving builds in the armory system allows for a quick change in game play. For example, it allows you to switch from your solo adventure mode “grinding build” to a “tankier support build” for group play instantly by visiting the wardrobe located by the in game mailbox.

Prior to patch 2.5.0, crafting materials would be stored in your inventory. This caused limited inventory space to be filled with crafting materials and gems. Now, all crafting materials will be maintained in a separate storage tab that does not affect your normal inventory space. In an Action RPG game based around RNG “random number generator” gear drops, you need as much inventory space as possible.

Seasons were first implemented into Diablo in patch 2.1, but for the PC client. Starting in 2.5.0 console gamers will be able to compete with each other on the same level as PC gamers. It will also allow for console gamers to earn the same season exclusive award previously only available to PC Diablo player base.

=== Rise of the Necromancer DLC ===
Blizzard's Rise of the Necromancer DLC pack introduced the Necromancer class, one of the five original classes of Diablo II, to the game. The new incarnation of the Necromancer was described as a "reimagining" of the earlier version; a number of the signature abilities (such as raising undead minions, bone spear attacks, and causing corpses to explode) were made available, though a number of new abilities were also added, as well as new gear sets and appearances. The DLC also included two additional character slots, more slots in the in-game stash, and cosmetic appearances such as a portrait frame, a pennant worn by the character, and a banner design and sigil. The pack cost $14.99 and was released with Patch 2.6.0 on June 27, 2017.

=== Patch 2.6.0 highlights ===
Patch 2.6.0 introduced a number of new features, including the Rise of the Necromancer pack announced at BlizzCon, as well as 30 new legendary items and four armor sets for the Necromancer class. An additional game mode, "Challenge Rifts", was also introduced. The Challenge Rifts mode takes a "snapshot" of a previously-completed Greater Rift, including the character, armor, and talent build used in that Greater Rift, as well as the enemies and powerups that appeared within it; if the player is able to beat the previously set completion time, they will receive a reward cache (similar to completing bounties). New zones were also added to certain maps in Adventure Mode: The Shrouded Moors and the Temple of the Firstborn near Caldeum (Act II), centered around a strange "blood cult", and the Realms of Fate in the High Heavens (Act IV), consequences of the battle between the Nephalem (player characters) and Diablo in the campaign story in Diablo III.

== Music ==
Diablo III: Reaper of Souls (Collector's Edition Soundtrack)

Soundtrack album by Derek Duke, Neal Acree, Joseph Lawrence, Russel Brower, Glenn Stafford, Jason Hayes
- Released: March 25, 2014
- Genre: Video game soundtrack
- Length: 69:47
- Label: Azeroth Music

The primary composer for Reaper of Souls is Derek Duke. Additional music was composed by Neal Acree, Joseph Lawrence, Russel Brower, Glenn Stafford, and Jason Hayes. The soundtrack was released on March 25, 2014 (the same day as the expansion was released) in two formats: a physical CD included in the Collector's Edition of Reaper of Souls, and as a digital release on iTunes.

== Reception ==
Reception

Aggregate score
Aggregator	Score
Metacritic	PC: 87/100

Review scores
Publication	Score
GameSpot	8/10
IGN	9.1/10
Polygon	9.5/10

Diablo III: Reaper of Souls received favorable reviews upon release, with critics praising its iteration upon the base game. On Metacritic, it currently has an average score of 87/100 rating based on 75 critics, indicating "generally favorable reviews". The expansion was lauded by many critics as a large improvement on most fronts from Diablo III and considered the changes made in it as responsible for the reinvigorated player interest in the franchise, giving the game greater replayability and long-term appeal. IGN's Vince Ingenito praised the expansion's darker atmosphere, diverse gameplay, and overhauled loot system, stating "it's more sinister in tone, more rewarding to play, and more maddeningly addictive than it's ever been." GameSpot's Carolyn Petit was positive about the expansion's gameplay and storyline, stating that it "gives those who already liked Diablo III more of what they already liked about it" but suggesting that it was unlikely to change the minds of players who didn't enjoy the initial game's release, due to it improving on but not fundamentally changing the experience. Petit summarized, "If you're looking for reasons to keep on clicking, Reaper of Souls has plenty." Polygon's Arthur Gies came to a similar conclusion, writing "Reaper of Souls reinvigorates an already great game".

=== Sales ===
Reaper of Souls sold 2.7 million copies in its first week on sale. By August 2014, Diablo III and Reaper of Souls had combined sales of 20 million copies. As of June 30, 2015, Diablo III and Reaper of Souls had combined sales of 30 million copies.
