= Champions Online =

2009 video game

- Developer: Cryptic Studios
- Publisher: Arc Games (Note: Previously published under the names Perfect World Entertainment and Gearbox Publishing San Francisco. Originally published by Atari between 2009-2011)
- Engine: Cryptic Engine
- Platform: Microsoft Windows
- Release: NA: September 1, 2009; EU: September 4, 2009; AU: September 10, 2009
- Genre: Massively multiplayer online role-playing game
- Mode: Multiplayer

Champions Online is a free-to-play superhero-themed massively multiplayer online role-playing game (MMORPG) developed by Cryptic Studios and published by Arc Games for Microsoft Windows. The game is based on the Champions license and its ruleset is loosely based on the HERO System.

== Gameplay ==
Gameplay screen

The game is an action-oriented role-playing game inspired by popular massively multiplayer games. Successful attacks and blocks increase a power meter which can then be spent to unleash more powerful actions. Death and defeat are handled in a similar manner to City of Heroes, in which a player may choose to be revived by a teammate or respawn at a neutral site. Players may sometimes gain the services of computer-controlled sidekicks and NPCs.

Defender, as seen in-game

The game does not make use of functional armor or weapons, unlike most MMOs. Instead, clothing is chosen by the player, and damage and other stats are based on the character design, advancement, and gear. While some gear items may grant temporary powers or equipment or have a special visual effect, most simply provide stat enhancements without a visual representation. Reflecting the game's original design as a console game, characters also possess much fewer skills than other early MMOs; however, each skill can be customized with a variety of player-chosen "Advantages." The game features an "orb system" where enemies defeated by the player may drop orbs that temporarily benefit the hero's powers, life, or energy. Additionally, it includes basic non-combat crafting skills, based on Science, Arms, and Magic. Characters are granted at least one travel power, including a choice of swinging using grappling hooks, flying, rocket boot jumping, hover disks, super jump, super speed, teleportation, and acrobatics (fast running, leaps, and flips).

Various power and cosmetic choices can be unlocked, either through gameplay or through lockboxes. Lockboxes are activated by keys that can be bought with game currency using real world money.

Endgame content is available when the character reaches the level cap of 40.

=== Locations ===
The action takes place in the Champions universe, featuring Champions characters as NPCs. Regions include urban sprawls, a dinosaur-infested island, underground ruins, and underwater lairs. Each region in the game is composed of several "instances" with up to 35 players per instance at any one time. This allows the game to run on one huge virtual server and for players to travel freely between instances to join with other players, rather than the game being fragmented into different servers. Many missions take place within smaller instances created especially for a team entering them. These instances are reset if the player leaves and returns. It is possible to revisit the same region to redo some missions again and again.

A special region called "the underground circuit" allows player vs. player competition. Stronghold, the setting's advanced prison for super-powered inmates, is used for player vs. player scenarios in which the player will take on the role of a supervillain trying to break out or a superhero trying to contain them.

=== Character creation ===
The game features a character creation system similar to City of Heroes, with additions such as the ability to edit a hero's movement animations, such as a beast-like hero opting to run and leap on all fours. The player may also edit the colour and firing position of their powers, such as changing a power's energy animation from red to green or changing the animation to fire from the head instead of the palms.

Another difference from most MMOs was the original elimination of any character class or archetype system; characters can take any skill or power. However, since the launch of the "Free for All" version of the game, freeform character creation was limited to Gold members (or free players willing to spend a substantial amount of Zen, the game's premium currency) and several archetypes were introduced for both Gold (subscriber) members and Silver (free-to-play) members. The game also supports solo play throughout a hero's career if desired.

=== Archetypes ===
Fifteen archetypes are available for free to all members of this game, in addition to a bonus archetype that can be unlocked by reaching the level cap for the first time with any character. The game also features premium archetypes that can be obtained via the game store. Certain premium archetypes can be acquired without cost through participating in various game events, wherein players can earn event currency during specific times of the year such as Halloween or Christmas.

At level 25, players can create their own custom Nemesis along with their minions using the same character creation system used to make the player's character, with added selections specifically for the Nemesis. The Nemesis's minions will then ambush the player's hero, providing clues and information leading to Nemesis missions and eventually a showdown with the player's Nemesis. After the player character defeats their nemesis, they put them in jail and are allowed to make more nemeses until they reach the limit, which is 18 nemeses.

== Development ==
The game's announcement followed the cancellation of Cryptic Studios' Marvel Universe Online as well as the sale of their intellectual properties City of Heroes and City of Villains to developer and publisher NCsoft in November 2007. On February 28, 2008, Cryptic Studios announced they had purchased the entire Champions intellectual property, licensing the rights to publish the 6th edition back to the former owner Hero Games. The 6th edition books synergistically allowed players to adapt their Champions Online characters to the pen-and-paper roleplaying game.

On July 10, 2008, 2K Games announced they would be publishing the game. Registration for the closed beta testing period was announced on October 10, 2008. However, on December 17, 2008, 2K Games officially dropped the publishing of the game due to the takeover of Cryptic Studios by Atari. Atari then developed and published the game along with the ongoing development of Star Trek Online.

The release was originally set for July 14, but on May 16, 2009, Cryptic Studios announced that Champions Online would be delayed and the game was officially released September 1. Executive producer and design director Bill Roper cited that the team needed more time to implement important features that the beta test group felt were necessary at launch.

As announced by Cryptic Studios in July 2009, the game includes microtransaction purchases. Most items available for purchase are vanity items that do not affect gameplay, such as costume pieces and in-game action figures. All items purchased are available to all characters on the account.

On July 20, 2009, a post on the official Champions Online Discussion Forum addressed the lack of any announcements regarding plans to release Champions Online on Xbox 360. It stated that "it has always been, and still remains our intent to release on consoles, and as soon as we're able to share more information about it, we will". The post also noted that the Xbox 360 FAQ had been removed from the Champions Online website. In a podcast interview for the gaming website vg247.com dated August 28, 2009, Jack Emmert elaborated on the issue, stating that the Xbox 360 version is "ready to go" but is facing an indefinite delay while awaiting Microsoft's approval, which is not readily forthcoming due to Microsoft's indecision on how to implement MMO's across Xbox Live.

On August 17, 2009, Cryptic Studios opened up their Beta servers for access through August 25 to allow the community to test and trial the system as well as submit bug reports and the game officially launched September 1, 2009. Those who pre-ordered the game gained instant access to the Open Beta on August 17 and some of those who pre-ordered (depending on their retailer) also gained access to an "Early Start" on the live servers beginning on August 28.

On September 1, 2009, Champions Online became available for purchase in-store as well as online stores. Pre-Order players were given until September 4 to enter their new product key to continue playing. The purchase included one free month of play and a special item specific to the retailer.

The game was originally available to paid subscribers only, but moved to the free-to-play model on January 25, 2011.

=== Technology ===
The game uses a new game engine developed by Cryptic Studios for use in all of their new MMO projects. The characters feature a special cel-shading Cryptic Studios refers to as comic shading, which includes bump mapping and high-resolution texture mapping. Hero facial animation will be stressed as well, allowing them to show emotion.

== Reception ==
During the 13th Annual Interactive Achievement Awards, the Academy of Interactive Arts & Sciences nominated Champions Online for "Role-Playing/Massively Multiplayer Game of the Year".
