= City of Heroes (disambiguation) =

City of Heroes is a massively multiplayer online role-playing game.

City of Heroes may also refer to:

- City of Heroes (Arrow), episode of television series
- City of Heroes (album), by Michael Kiske and Amanda Somerville
- City of Heroes (comics)
- City of Heroes Collectible Card Game
