= Gods & Heroes: Rome Rising =

2011 massively multiplayer online role-playing video game

- Developer(s): Perpetual Entertainment, Heatwave Interactive
- Engine: Proprietary engine (server), Proprietary, RenderWare, FaceGen and SpeedTree (client)
- Platform(s): Microsoft Windows
- Release: NA: June 21, 2011; EU: June 24, 2011
- Genre(s): MMORPG
- Mode(s): Multiplayer

Gods & Heroes: Rome Rising (abbreviated as G&H or GnH) was a massively multiplayer online role-playing video game developed by Heatwave Interactive and released in 2011 for Microsoft Windows. The game was set in ancient Rome, and combined historical elements and enemies (Etruscans, Faliscans, etc.) with mythological ones (Cyclopes, Gorgons, etc.). Players selected era-appropriate classes (Soldiers, Gladiators, Mystics, and Priests), each of which could be aligned with an Olympian god (such as Jupiter or Mars).

Originally developed by Perpetual Entertainment, the game was put on indefinite hold in October 2007. In February 2010, Heatwave Interactive announced it had acquired the rights to the game and planned to continue its development. The game was released in June 2011 with a retail purchase and subscription. In early 2012 the game switched to a free-to-play model with a $10 purchase of the game. The game and its forums entered maintenance in September 2012 and never fully returned, although some existing players were still able to log into game servers afterwards. Steam has since removed the game from its shop.

== Gameplay ==
In previous development, minions were touted as one of the game's unique features. There were several different ways to collect the more than 130 minions available in the game. The player can hire the minions to join their camp for a fee, earn minions as quest rewards, get minion contracts as loot drops or earn their respect by beating them in combat situations. These minions include warriors, ranged attackers, casters, and mythological creatures. These hirelings utilize an AI system enabling them to heal the player, attack, defend, form up in various formations and learn special moves. In addition, each god makes a different mythical minion available to their scions. In addition to the AI, players have the ability to control all aspects of their minions, such as telling a healer minion to heal a specific player, as well as customizable squad formations. As a character's level progresses, they gain the ability to control more minions at once, until a character had a full squad with four minions. Each party member will be able to bring up to four minions with them in a party. There are challenges, quests, and some instances that would have limitations on the number of minions the player is able to bring along.

== Development ==
The game was originally announced on March 9, 2005, by Perpetual Entertainment, and was slated for release in the 4th quarter of 2005, and then pushed again for 2008, but due to the challenge to develop both Gods & Heroes as well as Star Trek Online, the company decided to hold the development indefinitely. The game had been in closed beta since October 2006, but was shut down the day of hold announcement.

Sony Online Entertainment was named as the publisher and distributor for the game in North America, but had no hand in the development of the game.

The game reached a state of closed beta test. Only a few people were granted beta keys at the time. Beta keys were given away in random intervals on the official homepage. However, it was announced that the game's development would be put on indefinite hold, due to the developers shifting their focus to Star Trek Online, and the beta server was closed. Perpetual Entertainment, now known as P2 Entertainment, has since announced its dissolution.

On February 22, 2010, it was announced that Heatwave Interactive had acquired the rights to the Gods & Heroes, previously developed by Perpetual Entertainment, and that development was back underway. When asked at that time when the game would be released, Heatwave Interactive CEO Anthony Castoro estimated a "window of about a year to 18 months."

The game was released in June 2011 with a retail purchase and subscription.

In early 2012 the game switched to free play with a $10 purchase of the game. The game and its forums entered maintenance in September 2012 and never fully returned, although some existing players were still able to log into game servers at some points after that. Steam has since removed the game from its shop.

== Reception ==
Gods & Heroes: Rome Rising was well received at 2006's E3, receiving Allakhazam's Best of Show Award; TenTonHammer's Best of Show Award; MMORPG.com's Game of Show and Best Graphics Awards; Stratics' Best Gameplay Award; and GameAmp's Best Gameplay Award.
