= Perpetual Entertainment =

Former American video game developer and publisher

- Company type: Private
- Industry: Video games
- Founded: 2002
- Fate: Transferred assets to P2 Entertainment in 2007, which closed in 2008
- Headquarters: San Francisco, CA
- Key people: Joe Keene (Co-Chairman and CEO)
- Products: Star Trek Online (Now developed by Cryptic Studios); Gods & Heroes: Rome Rising (now developed by Heatwave Interactive); Perpetual Platform
- Website: Formerly perpetual.com

Perpetual Entertainment, founded in March 2002, was an American developer, publisher and operator of networked multiplayer games and MMORPGs. Their headquarters was located in San Francisco, California, United States. From October 2007 to February 2008 (following a transfer of assets) the company was known as P2 Entertainment. The company was best known for its development of two MMOs: Star Trek Online and Gods & Heroes: Rome Rising.

== Products ==
As Perpetual Entertainment, the company had previously developed to beta status Gods & Heroes: Rome Rising, which was put on indefinite hold in October 2007 after several rounds of layoffs. At that time, the company announced an intent to focus exclusively on Star Trek Online. On or after 14 January 2008 it was reported that the company had ceased development of the Star Trek license, which was transferred to Cryptic Studios.

Perpetual was also developing the Perpetual Entertainment Platform (PEP), a complete solution for developing, hosting, monitoring, and operating any networked online game. The PEP would have enabled games to simultaneously function on a wide variety of consumer game devices, including PCs, videogame consoles, cell phones, and hand-held computers. One notable licensee of this platform was BioWare.

The Perpetual Game Engine, a suite of reusable game tools and libraries for high-quality and stable development of networked games of all genres, was also being developed.

== Company liquidation ==
After a previous round of layoffs in December 2006, Perpetual underwent several further rounds of layoffs and staff defections in September and October 2007, before finally announcing the indefinite suspension of Gods & Heroes to allow the company to focus its efforts on Star Trek Online.

Subsequent to this announcement on October 10, 2007, Perpetual Entertainment Inc. transferred ownership of all its assets including Star Trek Online to Perpetual LLC, for liquidation and distribution of liquidation proceeds to creditors of Perpetual.

Shortly thereafter, Perpetual Entertainment's IP was "picked up" by P2 Entertainment, though the management remained unchanged. On January 14, 2008, it was announced that the company was no longer developing Star Trek Online, and that the Intellectual Property license, as well as game content, but not the game code, had been transferred to a Bay Area game developer. It was later confirmed that the new owner was Cryptic Studios.

In December 2007, a well-publicized lawsuit was bought by PR Firm Kohnke Communications against Perpetual. On January 24, 2008, it was announced that the suit had been dismissed following a mutual resolution by both parties.

On February 25, 2008, it was announced by several sources that P2 was closing its doors entirely. The company's websites have been shut down.
