= Bill Roper (video game producer) =

American video game designer and producer

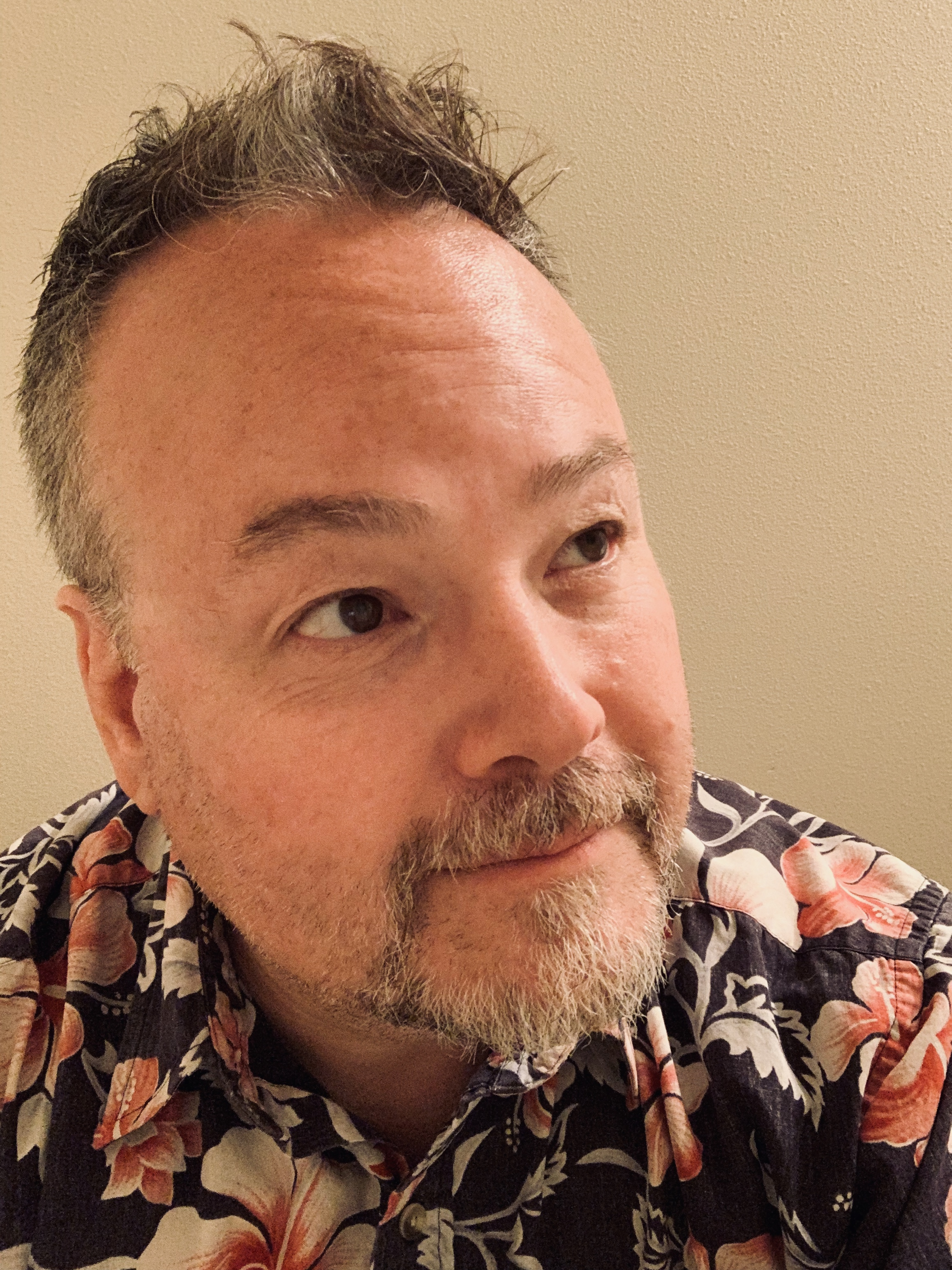
- Roper in 2019
- Born: March 27, 1965 (age 61); Concord, California, U.S.
- Occupations: Game designer, voice actor

Bill Roper (born March 27, 1965) is an American video game designer and producer. He is a co-founder and the current chief executive officer at Lunacy Games. Previously he was Chief Creative Officer at Web3 start-up Midnight. He has also served as co-founder and Chief Creative Officer at AuthorDigital (Adept Stusios / Arcadia Games) and was Chief Creative Officer at Improbable. Roper was Vice President/GM at Disney Interactive Studios from 2011 to 2016, and headed video game studios and creative and development departments for two decades, including divisions at Blizzard Entertainment, Flagship Studios, and Cryptic Studios. He is also an accomplished musician, and a founding member of the folk band The Poxy Boggards.

== Career ==
Roper worked at Blizzard North and Blizzard Entertainment from 1994 to 2003, and was vice president at Blizzard North at the time of his departure. He served in senior production and design capacities on the Warcraft, StarCraft, and Diablo series. He also provided voice-over talent for numerous games.

After his departure from Blizzard, Roper co-founded and held the position of CEO for Flagship Studios, the developer of Hellgate: London and Mythos (which was later released by HanbitSoft). In early 2008, amidst rumors of layoffs within the company, the company dissolved and lost the rights to both Mythos and Hellgate: London to Hanbitsoft and Comerica respectively, after it secured financing with Texas-based Comerica Bank to support the continuing development of its franchises. HanbitSoft currently owns the intellectual property rights to Mythos and Hellgate: London.

In November 2008 Roper joined Cryptic Studios as design director and Executive Producer of their newest project, Champions Online. In March 2010, Roper was promoted to Chief Creative Officer of Cryptic, replacing Jack Emmert after the latter transitioned to the role of Chief Operations Officer. On August 16, 2010, Roper announced his departure from Cryptic Studios to join Disney.

Roper was brought on to head the Marvel Franchise games created by Disney Interactive. He was then promoted to VP/GM, Core Games when Alex Seropian left Disney. While in this role, his Core Games group released Epic Mickey 2: The Power of Two, Fantasia: Music Evolved, and Disney Infinity, the latter quickly rising to high levels of critical and commercial success.

Roper was formerly Chief Creative Officer at Improbable. In an interview with VentureBeat, Bill Roper unveiled the name of a new studio he founded, Lunacy Games, which is currently developing an "open world survival RPG set in the post-apocalyptic American West" as well as a sequel to 2007's Hellgate: London, codenamed Hellgate: Redemption

== Honors ==
Roper was named #41 in IGN's Top 100 Game Creators of All Time.

== Game Titles ==
Roper has worked on the following titles:

- Blackthorne (1994) - Music
- Warcraft: Orcs & Humans (1994) - Producer, Voiceover, Documentation
- Warcraft II: Tides of Darkness (1995) - Design, Narration, Voiceover, Documentation
- Warcraft II: Beyond the Dark Portal (1996) - Executive Producer, Story Consultant, Narration, Voiceover
- Diablo (1997) - Producer, Voice Production, Casting & Directing, Story, Voiceover, Documentation, Strike Team
- StarCraft (1998) - Producer, Voiceover, Documentation, Strike Team
- StarCraft: Brood War (1998) - Executive Producer, Voiceover, Caterer, Documentation
- Warcraft II: Battle.net Edition (1999) - Producer
- Diablo II (2000) - Senior Producer, Voice Casting, Voiceover, Strike Team
- Diablo II: Lord of Destruction (2001) - Global Launch Team, Strike Team
- Warcraft III: Reign of Chaos (2002) - Voiceover, Strike Team
- Warcraft III: The Frozen Throne (2003) - Voiceover
- Hellgate: London (2007) - CEO
- Champions Online (2009) - Design Director, Executive Producer
- Star Trek Online (2010) - Design Director
- Avengers Initiative (2012) - VP/GM Product Development, Core Games
- Epic Mickey 2: The Power of Two (2012) - VP/GM Product Development, Core Games
- Disney Infinity (2013) - VP/GM Product Development, Core Games
- Fantasia: Music Evolved (2014) - VP/GM Product Development, Core Games
- Disney Infinity 2.0 (2014) - VP/GM Product Development, Core Games
- Disney Infinity 3.0 (2015) - VP/GM Product Development, Core Games
