= Homecoming Servers =

Video game developer

- Company type: Limited liability corporation
- Industry: Video games
- Predecessor: Cryptic Studios; Paragon Studios
- Founded: May 7th, 2019
- Headquarters: Remote
- Products: City of Heroes, City of Villains, City of Heroes Going Rogue
- Number of employees: 30+ (2024)
- Website: https://forums.homecomingservers.com
- Footnotes / references Company #: 7407345

Homecoming Servers is a video game developer that specializes in the operation, preservation, and expansion of the City of Heroes MMORPG. Homecoming has been developing City of Heroes on a volunteer basis since their founding on May 7, 2019.

Homecoming: City of Heroes began as a secret server named SCoRE, operating for 6 years before its existence was leaked in April 2019. The leak ended up splitting the community: some were relieved it was back, while others were angered that they had been lied to. Shortly after the leak on April 25, 2019, Homecoming launched its first server. On January 4, 2024, they obtained a Limited License with NCSoft to continue development on the game in an official capacity.

== Games ==
Homecoming Servers currently develops:

- City of Heroes
- City of Villains
- City of Heroes Going Rogue
