= Jack Emmert =

American game designer

- Occupation: Game designer

Jack Emmert is an American game designer. He has worked on role-playing video games.

== Career ==
Emmert had been playing the role-playing game Champions ever since it was released in 1981. He spent his teenage years reading comic books and playing AD&D. During his student years, Emmert wrote several pen and paper RPG supplements to make ends meet. After a lengthy stint in academia, he co-founded Cryptic Studios. He designed the MMORPGs City of Heroes and City of Villains. Emmert was the chief creative officer and directed the design of all games from Cryptic Studios, and was involved in the development of Marvel Universe Online. He and Cryptic later decided that Champions would be a suitable replacement for the Marvel Comics IP that they had lost, thus Cryptic purchased the rights for the Champions game and its universe from Hero Games in 2008. Emmert was the online producer for Star Trek Online.

In March 2010, Bill Roper was promoted to chief creative officer, succeeding Emmert (who became the chief operations officer). In March 2011, Emmert was promoted to chief executive officer when John Needham left to pursue other opportunities in the gaming industry.

On June 8, 2016, Emmert was made CEO of Daybreak Game Company, a studio in Austin, Texas. He was in charge of the Daybreak Games studio that was responsible for DC Universe Online, and he oversaw all development while reporting to Daybreak headquarters located in San Diego.

Emmert established NetEase's company Jackalope Games in May 2022.

Emmert returned as CEO of Cryptic Studios in January 2026.
