= City of Heroes =

2004 video game

- Developers: Cryptic Studios (formerly); Paragon Studios (formerly); Homecoming Servers
- Publisher: NCSOFT
- Platforms: Microsoft Windows, Mac OS X
- Release: Windows: NA: April 28, 2004; EU: February 4, 2005; Mac OS X: WW: January 8, 2009
- Genre: Massively multiplayer online role-playing
- Mode: Multiplayer

City of Heroes (CoH) is a massively multiplayer online role-playing game originally created by Cryptic Studios prior to the IP’s acquisition by NCSoft. Previously developed by the now-defunct Paragon Studios, it is currently developed by several private servers, one of them being Homecoming Servers who have a limited license from NCSoft. The game was launched in North America on April 28, 2004, and in Europe by NCsoft Europe on February 4, 2005, with English, German and French servers. In the game, players created super-powered player characters that could team up with others to complete missions and fight criminals belonging to various gangs and organizations in the fictional Paragon City.

Twenty-three free major updates for City of Heroes were released before its shutdown. The final live update, "Where Shadows Lie", was released on May 31, 2012. On August 31, 2012, NCsoft terminated its Paragon Studios development team, ending all production on City of Heroes with the last day of services on November 30, 2012.

In April 2019, source code capable of running a City of Heroes server was distributed widely. This made it possible to create City of Heroes servers outside the direct purview of NCSoft and revived interest in the game, which by then had been out of development for more than six years.

On January 4, 2024, NCSoft granted Homecoming Servers, LLC, who operated the rogue server Homecoming: City of Heroes an official license to host the game.

== Production history ==
In 2000, writer Rick Dakan and Michael Lewis created Cryptic Studios. The company's first project was City of Heroes, the idea for the game which Dakan claims to have come up with. Dakan was named Lead Design on the game, doing mostly writing for characters and story. Even after resigning from Cryptic, Dakan remained involved with the game through the publishing of the City of Heroes comic book.

On October 31, 2005, the game's first sequel, City of Villains (CoV), was launched, allowing players to play as supervillains. The stand-alone expansion pack did not require City of Heroes to run, but if the user had both games, content was added to the City of Heroes side of game play. On July 16, 2008, NCsoft merged the two games' content together. Thus, a player who only owned City of Heroes could now play City of Villains, and vice versa. Prior to this, a purchase was required to access either game's content, but they were linked by one account and subscription fee.

On November 6, 2007, NCsoft announced their purchase of the City of Heroes/City of Villains intellectual property and transitioned the staff from Cryptic Studios to a new location in Mountain View, California, to continue development of the game. The new studio on April 14, 2009, became Paragon Studios, which shared credit with Cryptic Studios for the development work. This then led to City of Heroes becoming available for download on Steam, along with other NCsoft titles, on April 22, 2009.

On October 30, 2008, NCsoft announced a partnership with Transgaming Technologies in order to bring both City of Heroes and City of Villains and all 13 expansions to Mac OS X.

The City of Heroes: Going Rogue expansion's release was announced on May 11, 2009. This part of the game centered on the alternate reality of Praetoria and featured a new alignment system allowing players characters to shift allegiances between Heroes and Villains, giving characters access to both Paragon City of City of Heroes and the Rogue Isles of City of Villains. Paragon Studios described this as "[exploring] the shades of gray that lay between Heroes and Villains". Going Rogue was released on August 17, 2010, with pre-purchasers able to play on August 16.

On June 20, 2011, Paragon Studios announced that they were going to switch to a hybrid subscription model called City of Heroes: Freedom, adding in a free-to-play game model. Special models for former subscribers would be termed Premium Players, and current subscribers would become VIP players, who would gain access to all the content in the various upcoming game updates.

On August 31, 2012, Paragon Studios announced that it was being closed, and City of Heroes would cease all billing immediately and begin the process of shutting down the service. The stated explanation for this move was a "realignment of company focus and publishing support". November 30, 2012, was listed as the official shutdown date of the game and the servers were turned off at midnight PST. Many players arrived en masse to express their continued protest, support, and fond farewells, including messages of gratitude from the developers and moderators thanking their fans for their support and passion for the game. A variety of efforts got underway, led by players of the game, to keep the game operating past the announced date of closure.

Missing Worlds Media's president Nate Downes announced in September 2014 that he introduced an interest party who wanted to make a deal in reviving the game's intellectual property with NCSoft staff, which might enable the final version of the game to be released. No additional info was released as the involved parties were under an NDA. The effort did not succeed, and the announcement has since been removed. This may have been due to the IP being used in Master X Master.

On April 15, 2019, news broke that a private server based on City of Heroes at the time of its shutdown had been running in secret for years. Three days later, source code relating to the server had been widely distributed, and a publicly accessible server based on the code was quickly spun up. While perceived threats, legal or otherwise, saw this server shut down by April 22, multiple public servers by various teams have since been set up based on the leaked code.

On January 4, 2024, the Homecoming fan server announced that it had worked out a deal with NCSoft and was now running an officially licensed instance of City of Heroes and its expansions, free to play and funded by donations.

== Gameplay ==
A tanker (foreground) confronts one of the game's arch villains, the mad scientist Dr. Vahzilok, in City of Heroes.

City of Heroes required the creation of a character in order to enter the virtual world and progress through the game. After creating a character and selecting a name (the game would check if the name was already taken on the server), players could either begin play in an isolated tutorial zone, or skip the tutorial and begin in an open low-level zone. A character's level increased by earning experience points from defeating foes, completing Missions, and exploring Zones, then returning to one of various named NPCs known as Trainers. Benefits for rising in level included more Health, more Powers to choose for the character, more slots to allocate Enhancements to Powers, and larger inventories for Inspirations (quick use items) and Salvage (crafting materials). If a player lost all of their Health they were temporarily considered defeated, at which point they could be revived through use of an item, by an ally's powers, or by instant teleportation to Hospitals on the map. After reaching character level 10, a player defeat would accrue Experience Debt which temporarily made gaining additional experience more difficult.

The setting of the game, Paragon City for Heroes and The Rogue Isles for Villains, was divided into different Zones accessed through in-game transportation systems. Especially dangerous zones called "Hazard" or "Trial" zones, which teemed with larger groups of enemies, were marked in red on the in-game map and were much more dangerous than normal zones. The Villains' setting, the Rogue Isles, consisted of islands connected by a network of ferries and helicopters while the Heroes' setting, Paragon City consisted of regions separated by giant energy "War Walls" (which were justified in the back story) and were connected by direct access points and a Metropolitan Transport system styled on a light rail. A few zones were accessible to both heroes and villains; some were cooperative zones, while others were player versus player (PvP) zones. Praetoria, for characters created in the Going Rogue update, lacked War Walls, allowing more or less free movement between areas.

Players initially moved around the zones by jogging or using a minor speed-increasing power such as "Sprint". As heroes grew in level and accumulated more powers, they could choose among four higher speed traveling powers: Teleportation, Super Speed, Super Jumping, and Flight.

As characters leveled-up, players could choose new powers from the character's primary and secondary power sets, as set during creation, or from shared power pools. The power pools contained the four travel powers and other generic, usually utilitarian, powers that fell under categories such as Fitness, Concealment, and Leadership. In addition, as characters leveled up, they gained access to new costume features, including the ability to change between up to five costumes and unlockable costume parts such as capes and auras (unlocked after missions).

Quests in the game were known as missions, and were obtained through various channels, generally from various NPCs the player met in the game. Although missions could be completed alone, the player had the option to form Teams with other player characters to play off of each other's characters' strengths and abilities. The level of the characters used, size of the team, and a separate difficulty scale chosen by the player called Notoriety, all affected the difficulty of the mission. Missions could take the form of an instanced area where the player(s) must defeat a boss, save NPC characters held hostage (sometimes taking the form of escort missions), or search the instance for a certain object or number of objects (such as clues or defusing bombs), while other Missions required that players defeat a certain number and type of mobs, possibly in a defined area of the game. Some missions are part of story arcs that involve the player in a larger narrative that tells some of the back story of the setting. Task Forces (City of Heroes), Strike Forces (City of Villains), and Trials (both) were particular missions that could be completed multiple times, but only as part of a team, and had to be completed in entirety to earn particular rewards for completion, such as the ability to respec a character's chosen Powers and Enhancements.

Cooperative play also took the form of larger player-created clans called Supergroups, reminiscent of comic book groups such as the Justice League, the Avengers, or the Brotherhood of Mutants. Players part of Supergroups could team up together or convene in Bases (introduced with City of Villains). Bases were used for social meeting or housing special items used in crafting Inventions, serving as a collective item vault, or to recover after losing all Health in the overworld. Supergroups in turn could form Coalitions with each other for increased collaborations. Coalitions were generally formed for the raids featured in the game.

Another form of cooperative play was the Sidekick feature, which allowed for characters of disparate experience levels to participate in the game together. A Sidekick's experience level would be temporarily risen to be close to their partner's level, and their Health and strength would be scaled to their artificial level, while any experience or Influence they gained was scaled to their original level. A reverse feature known as Exemplar was added later, which artificially lowered the level of a higher level character (also removing access to powers unavailable at their new level), but they earn experience at their original level, which is useful in removing Debt, or gains Influence rather than Experience. For the release of City of Villains, these features are Lackey and Malefactor. Issue 16 overhauled the system such that it was automatically scaled to the "Anchor", which was either the player on the team whose mission the team was set to perform or the team's leader.

Players could also set "leveling pacts" which allowed two players to sync up the experience their characters gained, although this was disabled in a later update.

Other game features included auction houses and crafting inventions to make characters more powerful or unlock further costume options. The Architect release gave players the ability to construct custom mission arcs, with customized enemies and layouts that could then be played by all other players. The Going Rogue expansion allowed players to switch their alignment using Tip Missions collected from defeated enemies.

== Character creation ==
In character creation, the player first selected a character's origin and archetype, then primary and secondary power sets. Next, the actual avatar with its costume was created. Then the player had a choice of customizing the colors of his/her powers. Lastly, the player chose a name and could optionally write a background story to add some flavor to the character, as well as creating an individual battle cry.

There were five origins a player could choose for his/her character that dictated what type of enhancements the character may use, affected which single short-ranged power they begin with (in addition to powers obtained from their primary and secondary power sets), and influenced the various enemy groups that the character went up against. These origins were as follows:

- Natural: Powers obtained through training the body, weapons, or inherent abilities if the character is not human
- Magic: Powers obtained through a magic item, magical spells, or a mystical being
- Science: Powers obtained through some sort of scientific means, whether intentionally or accidentally
- Mutation: Powers obtained through a change in genetics, manifesting at any point in their life
- Technology: Powers obtained through highly advanced technology

A special "Incarnate" origin was programmed for various NPCs in the game who obtained powers from the fictional Well of the Furies. The "Incarnate System" added additional powers for the player to choose from after completing difficult missions.

There were five basic hero archetypes, which affected a character's power choices and team role throughout the game. Blasters were versatile damage dealers, capable of fighting at short or long range against one or many opponents, but had relatively little health. Controllers were adept at preventing enemies from moving or acting through inducing status effects, as well as possessing pet summons. Defenders turned the tide of battle with weakening enemy attacks (debuffs) and ally-strengthening (buffs). Scrappers were melee fighters with a greater chance of critical hits against tough opponents such as bosses. Tankers possessed great defenses and the ability to take hits for the team, as well as powers to adjust aggro towards them.

There were also five basic villain archetypes. Brutes dealt increasing damage as they attacked or were themselves attacked. Corruptors could cause damage at range, with high chance for critical hits against wounded targets. Dominators assailed enemies with status effects and direct damage. Masterminds summoned, upgraded, and controlled combat pets. Stalkers were stealthy fighters, dealing critical hits when hidden or when accompanied by a team.

There were also two epic hero archetypes which were unlocked after reaching level 20 (level 50 prior to Issue 17) with another hero character. Peacebringers were peaceful symbiotic aliens that had light based powers. Warshades were war-like symbiotes that were normally enemies to the Peacebringers but had reformed their evil ways. Both archetypes were capable of shapeshifting into a more offensive or more defensive form. The villain side mirrored this, with two branching villain archetypes which were unlocked after reaching level 20 (also level 50 prior to Issue 17) with another villain character. Both are rank-and-file soldiers for the villainous group Arachnos (Soldiers and Widows) attempting to make a name for themselves, each with two distinct specializations.

With Issue 21, players could now create a character and go through a tutorial involving the destruction of Galaxy City by Shivans that allowed them to choose their alignment, such as a heroic Corruptor or a villainous Blaster. Heroes went to Paragon City, and Villains went to the Rogue Isles. Characters created with Going Rogue started the game in Praetoria, and chose whether to be a Loyalist, who followed Emperor Cole, or to be in the Resistance, who opposed him. In Praetoria, however, things were not so black and white. There were good and evil people on both sides, and, when leaving Praetoria at level 20, players could choose their character to be either a Hero or a Villain. The alignment could also be changed later on, allowing for Heroes to go Vigilante before becoming Villains or Villains to become Rogues before being redeemed as Heroes.

== Virtual rewards ==
Similarly to other MMORPGs, City of Heroes/Villains had various items that were rewarded within the game. However, many of these items were described as intangible or other-worldly; such as "inspirations" (temporary power-ups) or "inf" (an abbreviation of "influence", "infamy", or "information", for Heroes, Villains, and Praetorians, respectively, which was used instead of money), which were abstract ideas in the real world. "Enhancements" — slottable attribute boosts — also covered a range of ideas and items from magic enchantments to technological gadgets to training techniques. With the release of Issue 6, while in supergroup mode, a setting that could be toggled on and off, players accumulated prestige points which were used to improve the supergroup base.

Issue 9 brought the Invention system to the game, which allowed characters to combine other dropped items they salvaged and recipes to create various goods. Invented enhancements could provide better bonuses than normal enhancements, including set bonuses for slotting invented enhancements from the same set into the same power. Costume pieces and limited-use temporary powers could also be invented.

In addition to these, there were also collectible badges for players to earn. Gained for performing various actions in game (such as moving over specific places in each zone, defeating certain numbers of enemies, healing allies, and taking damage) most served no functional purpose for players, except to provide characters with tag lines under their character names. However, a few, called "Accolades" gave players access to temporary powers and permanent bonuses to health and endurance (the game's equivalent to mana or magic points) and were gained by collecting other badges.

Players also had the option of purchasing a vast array items on the Paragon Market. Introduced with City of Heroes: Freedom, the Paragon Market was a cash shop wherein players could purchase, for example, power sets, costume sets, temporary powers and boosts, character renames and respecs, extra costume slots, and access to game content that to which they might not normally have access. The currency used on the Paragon Market was Paragon Points, which were either purchased with real money through the Market or awarded as bonuses for VIP subscribers.

== Enemies ==
In City of Heroes there were multiple NPC groups that players fought as part of random encounters. Many enemies were found on the streets of Paragon City and the Rogue Isles, whereas others were found in specific instances or areas. There were also Giant Monsters and zone events that took place in parts of the city that were even more uncommon, such as Lusca the giant octopus in the waters of the Independence Port zone or the Ghost of Scrapyard that wanders through Sharkhead Isle. Enemies in instances were also graded with easier NPC's at the start of the map and more difficult enemies towards the end of the instance.

== Setting ==
The setting of City of Heroes is the fictional Paragon City, located in Rhode Island in the United States.

Paragon City is divided into several smaller neighborhoods that had varying enemies and progressively higher levels of enemies within them. The arbitrary divisions between zones are explained in game by the presence of "War Walls", powerful force fields derived from alien technology which were used to defend various areas of the city. Heroes set out by dealing with low-powered street gangs in the initial zones, working their way up to fighting increasingly dangerous threats — such as organized crime, corrupt corporations, hostile aliens, and supernatural terrors.

== Updates and history ==
The Development Team continually expanded City of Heroes with free downloadable patches/updates as well as free game expansions dubbed "Issues". All Issues were made available to both City of Heroes and (as of Issue 6) City of Villains titles throughout the lifespan of the game, improving features in both games with each release.

=== Issues (free updates) ===
Issue #	Title	Main features	Release date
1	"Through the Looking Glass"	Raised the level cap from 40 to 50, introduced new high level enemy groups and zones for these levels, and added a tailor feature allowing players to alter character costumes.	June 9, 2004
2	"Shadows of the Past"	Added cape and aura costume features, respecing, badges, and new zones (one of which included a secret dance club without enemies).	September 16, 2004
3	"A Council of War"	Introduced a new zone, replaced the Nazi-themed 5th Column enemy group with The Council, added new giant monsters and zone events, added Peacebringers and Warshades, and added Ancillary Power Pools for characters above level 40.	January 4, 2005
4	"Colosseum"	Introduced player versus player (PvP) content in the form of an arena, and also added costume options such as finer tuning of body and face scale.	May 4, 2005
5	"A Forest of Dread"	Introduced a new folklore-themed zone, with several new associated enemy groups, as well as new power sets based on archery and sonic powers.	August 31, 2005
6	"Along Came a Spider"	Updated the game client's graphics engine, and added support for dual-core CPUs and 3D sound; it also introduced three shared PvP zones, and the ability for Super Groups to build bases.	October 27, 2005
7	"Destiny Manifest"	Raised the level cap for villains from 40 to 50, introduced the new zone for villains of that level range, "Patron Power Pools" (the villainous counterpart to heroes' Ancillary Power Pools), "Mayhem Missions" for Villains of all levels, new power sets for new Villains, and a fourth PvP zone, "Recluse's Victory".	June 6, 2006
8	"To Protect and Serve"	Introduced a Police Scanner for Heroes that provided repeatable missions (similar to the Villains' Newspaper) and "Safeguard Missions" (analogous to the Villains' "Mayhem Missions"), as well as a complete redesign of the Faultline zone and the Veteran Rewards system, which gave special "perks" to players based on how long their accounts had been active. A retail box was released after this update called "Good vs. Evil Edition".	November 28, 2006
9	"Breakthrough"	Introduced the Invention system and auction houses; it also revamped the game's single raid encounter and opened it to Villain players as well.	May 1, 2007
10	"Invasion"	Replaced the old Rikti Crash Site zone with a new Rikti War Zone area, featuring a new raid encounter and cooperative play between both Heroes and Villains. The Rikti enemy group was also redesigned, and a new world event was added in which the Rikti would stage a mass invasion of a random zone.	July 24, 2007
11	"A Stitch in Time"	Focused on time travel; it introduced the Flashback system for accessing or repeating game content beneath a player's level. It also added customizable weapon graphics for power sets which used drawn weapons, and new power sets based on dual blade wielding and willpower.	November 28, 2007
12	"Midnight Hour"	Introduced new magic- and mythology-themed zones, including one set in ancient Rome; the Arachnos Soldier and Arachnos Widow archetypes, and began "power proliferation" by which power sets unique to certain archetypes were made accessible to other archetypes.	May 20, 2008
13	"Power and Responsibility"	Added two new power sets (Shields and Pain Domination), changes to power effects making them act differently in PvP situations, dual builds (Players can build and maintain two separate character builds on the same character), and leveling pacts (Players can level up two characters simultaneously in-game, even if one of them is offline). In January 2009, a download-only release was made of Issue 13 called "Mac Special Edition", which allowed computers running Mac OS X to play City of Heroes for the first time.	December 2, 2008
14	"Architect"	Added the Mission Architect feature that allowed players to publish and play custom mission arcs. A retail box release was made after this update called "Architect Edition", available to both PC and Mac players.	April 8, 2009
15	"Anniversary"	Announced on April 28, the date of City of Heroes' Fifth Anniversary, this update returned the 5th Column as an enemy group in various zones and a 5th Column-centric Task Force and Strike Force. It also added Mission Architect features that did not make the deadline for Issue 14, costume sets, new character faces, and the first free costume change emotes.	June 29, 2009
16	"Power Spectrum"	Allowed players to choose the color/styles/animation paths for character power sets. This update also included more power set proliferation, added epic power pool choices, a new Sidekicking system, Levels 5–24 adjustments to increase XP/influence rewards by 20%, minor changes to the Mission Architect, and a replacement of the difficulty adjustment system.	September 15, 2009
17	"Dark Mirror"	An update to the graphics engine that fixed all older issues related to ATI cards, as well as added a new preset for high performance graphic cards called "Ultra Mode", several QoL updates, and a revamped Positron's Task Force. Issue 17 also permitted CoH: Going Rogue pre-order customers to play Dual Pistols and Demon Summoning power sets prior to the official release of Going Rogue.	April 28, 2010
18	"Shades of Gray"	Introduced the tips system, an alternate method of getting missions via drops from enemies, opened trading between alignments, and united the Wentworth's auction house and the Black Market. Anyone with the Going Rogue expansion received access to new power sets Kinetic Melee and Electricity Control. This issue also re-introduced the Cathedral of Pain trial. A retail box release was made of Issue 18 called "City of Heroes Going Rogue: The Complete Collection".	August 16, 2010
19	"Alpha Strike"	Issue 19 included the first part of the new endgame changes referred to as the "Incarnate system", as well as an Ouroboros task force that unlocks an "Alpha Slot" on Level 50 Characters. Two difficult task forces were added for characters who had gained their Alpha Slots. Other changes included Zone events in all Praetoria city maps, opening Praetoria to levels past 20, merging subways/ferries to include all destinations (across same alignment only), power animations, increased tip mission drops, mission architect enhancements, hazard zone badges, and making the Fitness Power Pool inherent to all characters.	November 30, 2010
20	"Incarnates"	Issue 20 further expanded on the Incarnate system introduced in Issue 19. It also introduced "leagues", massive teams of characters that could involve up to 48 different characters at a time, for anything from Rikti Mothership raids to costume contests. It introduced the Behavioral Adjustment Facility and Lambda Sector trials in Praetoria for Incarnate characters, and gave Heroes a new level 20–40 task force, and Villains a new level 20–40 strike force. Players could also sign up for incarnate trials from anywhere in the cities.	April 5, 2011
21	"Convergence"	Issue 21 was the first free expansion under the City of Heroes: Freedom program. It added the First Ward zone to the Going Rogue exclusive game content, which included a new Giant Monster and a new Incarnate trial. A new Time Manipulation Power Set was also released, although only for VIP subscribers, as well as new costume options. In addition to these, the expansion created a new co-op tutorial for all players which would determine whether the player's character was a Hero or a Villain (similar to the Going Rogue tutorial).	September 13, 2011
22	"Death Incarnate"	Issue 22 relaunched the Dark Astoria zone as an Incarnate Co-op Zone. The first zone of its kind in City of Heroes, Level 50+ characters could gain Incarnate XP to unlock slots while fighting solo or in teams in normal missions (whereas before, Incarnate XP was only gained by participating in trials with League play). Further additions included a new Incarnate Trial (Dilemma Diabolique), new power sets (Beast Mastery and Darkness Control) available from the Paragon Market or free to VIPs, and a new Trial (Drowning in Blood) for Level 15+. Also of note, starting with this release Statesman had been removed as a living contact/NPC in City of Heroes after the cliffhanger of the "Who Will Die?" Signature Series player arc was revealed in January.	March 6, 2012
23	"Where Shadows Lie"	Issue 23 ended the Praetorian War, following the deaths of signature characters Statesman and Sister Psyche, with Emperor Cole trying to destroy the dimensions and take over Primal Earth. This also introduced the new co-op area of Night Ward where various new mystical enemy forces were gathering.	May 31, 2012
24	"Resurgence"	Issue 24 was to bring an epilogue to the Praetorian War storyline, with Praetorian Earth and Galaxy City evacuated because of the loss to Hamidon and several characters from other affected areas moving to Primal Earth and other parts of Paragon City to rebuild after the chaos. Heroes would help integrate and rebuild, while Villains would take the opportunity to invade Praetoria to become the new emperor. NCSoft cancelled any further development for the City of Heroes project on August 31, 2012, halting the release of Issue 24 to the beta and live servers.	N/A
24	"Resurgence" (HC)	Issue 24 (HC) focused on bringing what Paragon had finished to release using the latest Open Beta build as a base. From this point on development is volunteer based.	January 7, 2013
25	"Unbroken Spirit"	Issue 25 served as the basis for Homecoming's launch. Feature Highlights include: New archetype: Sentinels; 7 New Powersets; Proliferating existing powersets to different Archetypes; Finished Kallisti Wharf a zone leftover from shutdown.; Rebalanced Incarnate system; Extensive updates to supergroup bases	May 21st, 2013
26	"Homecoming"	Issue 26 consisted primarily on clean-up and quality of life updates. Issues from this point on were split into smaller "Pages" due to differences in development. Feature Highlights include: 8 Exploration Badges and an Accolade added to Echo: Faultline; 2 new story arcs one for vigilante and one for rogue; 800+ new items to the base editor; A new 32-bit and 64-bit client to future proof the game; Reworked Sniper attacks and Dominator Assault sets; The Force of Will Specialized Power Pool; New Exploration Badges and Accolades added to PvP zones; New customization for Phantom Army that mirrors the players current costume; New support powerset, Electrical Affinity; The Experimentation Specialized Power Pool; 5 new IO Sets	P1: May 16, 2019; P2: August 22, 2019; P3: October 1, 2019; P4: Jan. 23, 2020; P5: March 31, 2020
27	"Second Chances"	Issue 27 was the largest issue developed by Homecoming to date, spanning four years and adding a significant amount of content. The release of Page 7 marks Homecoming Servers official status. Feature Highlights include: 10 New Story Arcs; A New Personal Story; 7 New Powersets; 5 New Enhancement sets.; New specialized Enhancements; 1 New Strike Force; Rikti Warzone Revamp; Proliferating existing powersets to different Archetypes; Advanced Modes for 3 task forces adding new mechanics and content; Aether Costumes, featuring unlockable costume powers.; New Player Experience Improvements; Weapon Holstering/Sheathing; and much, much more	P1: Nov. 24, 2020; P2: April 20th, 2021; P3: Nov. 26th, 2021; P4: Aug. 23rd, 2022; P5: Oct. 18th, 2022; P6: April 25th, 2023; P7: Feb. 20th, 2024
28	"Legacy"	Issue 28, currently underway with 1 page. Page 1 aimed to be smaller and faster to avoid the excessive feature creep seen in Issue 27, Page 7. Feature Highlights include: 1 New Raid Zone; 1 New Powerset; 1 New Story Arc	P1: July 23rd, 2024

=== Expansions (paid updates) ===
Expansion title	Corresponding issue #	Release date	Summary (paid features only)
City of Villains	6: Along Came a Spider	October 2005	Villain player archetypes, villain character tutorial and villain player zones (Level 1–50), player vs. player zones, player-created superbase system.
City of Heroes: Going Rogue	18: Shades of Gray	August 2010	Hero/Villain side-switching capability, Praetorian character tutorial and Praetorian character Zones (Level 1–20), power sets.

==== City of Villains ====
City of Villains was released in 2005 as a stand-alone expansion, an expansion that did not require the original City of Heroes purchase to work. It offered five new character archetypes that were, at the time, exclusive to Villain characters, new maps, and began the first PvP Zones (versus the Arena, which were instanced maps made for PvP fighting) of the game. City of Villains also was playable with the same subscription fee that paid for City of Heroes access after buying City of Villains. The retail box included four CD-ROMs for installation current to Issue 6, one of four limited edition HeroClix figures of the game's villains, a poster of a map of the Rogue Isles, and a serial code that gave access to the game and one month of game play. Also included was a code for a 30-day trial for City of Heroes, as both games were currently separate. Since 2008, after the NCSoft acquisition of the intellectual properties, owning either City of Heroes or City of Villains unlocked both titles at no additional cost.

==== Going Rogue ====
City of Heroes: Going Rogue was released in 2010. Unlike City of Villains, Going Rogue was an expansion rather than a stand-alone expansion and required the original game to play. Going Rogue added an Alignment system, which allowed players to switch from Hero to Villain and added two intermediate Alignments: Vigilante, as a player progresses from Hero to Villain, and Rogue, as a player progresses from Villain to Hero. Players with Vigilante or Rogue characters had access to both City of Heroes's Paragon City and City of Villains's Rogue Isles until they change to Hero or Villain. The expansion also added the Praetorian Earth dimension where players could start out as neutrally-aligned Praetorians (choosing any of the ten basic Archetypes available to Heroes or Villains), either deciding to side with Emperor Cole's ruling faction and become a Loyalist or side with the Resistance; the allegiance could change as the player chose and completed missions. Praetorian players could also attack new Neutral mobs and would eventually be able to play a mission that allowed them to choose to be a Hero or Villain and complete gameplay in the original games. Going Rogue also granted access to four new power sets, new costume sets and auras, and introduced missions that started after defeating mobs that affected the player's Alignment.

=== Retail releases and special editions ===
- City of Heroes: Collector's Edition: Sold through stores in 2005, this included an installation DVD-ROM that had game content up to Issue 4, a poster of a map of Paragon City, a CoH/PvP comic book, a Statesman HeroClix figure, and a serial code that added access to a special movement power, badge, and cape, in addition to access to the game and one month of game play. A special Hero Kit was later sold that allowed people to get all of the physical and digital content included in the Collector's Edition aside from the game installation disc.
- City of Villains: Collector's Edition: Sold in stores alongside the standard game edition, this pack included an installation DVD-ROM current through Issue 6, seven exclusive HeroClix figures of characters from both games, a book featuring concept art for both games, a promotional card for the City of Heroes Collectible Card Game, one of five preview decks for the CCG, a two-sided poster of the game map from the standard edition and a Heroes vs. Villains fight scene, a CoH trial serial code, and a serial code that allowed access to a special costume icon and cape, in addition to access to CoV and one month of game play.
- City of Heroes: Bootleg Edition: A trial copy of City of Heroes released free of charge as a promotional copy during City of Villains. The Bootleg Edition came with no special features, a 10-day demo key, and required a player to purchase a digital key for the City of Heroes or City of Villains game in order to play after the demo. Released during Issue 6, the disc allowed players to try either Heroes or Villains.
- City of Heroes & City of Villains: Good Versus Evil Edition: This retail box included an installation DVD-ROM current to Issue 7, a two-sided map of Paragon City and the Rogue Isles, digital copies of issues 1 through 6 of Top Cow's CoH comic book, and a "Pocket D VIP Pass" that had the serial code for access to both games, a month of free game play, special costume pieces for both Heroes and Villains, a special badge, and two special powers. This serial code was later made available digitally.
- City of Heroes: Architect Edition: This edition of the game included an installation DVD-ROM current to Issue 14 for both PC and Mac, a quick-start guide, the map from the Good Versus Evil Edition, and an activation code for the unified games, one month of free game play, and access to one of the first two Super Booster packs. A digital-only purchase later was made available for the same content.
- City of Heroes Going Rogue: Complete Collection: Released in 2010 alongside the standard version of the game, this edition includes City of Heroes, City of Villains, and adds access to unique in-game costume pieces, auras, emotes, and a unique invisibility power in addition to access to all of the content available with the standard Going Rogue game. Ordering this from GameStop included exclusive power enhancements.

=== Booster packs ===
Starting in 2008, "Booster Packs" were also released sporadically around Issue updates. Booster Packs did not function like expansions (adding content to the game), but rather added optional costume sets to the game's character creator and user interface, and were available on the NCsoft Store for a one-time fee. Although each of these packs were themed after their similarly named character option in the game (so far character origins and power sets), their features could be applied to any or all the characters in a player's account regardless of their actual origin, archetype or powers. There was also a "Mini-Booster" pack for the purchase of an in-game jetpack for 30 days of real time.

As of August 30, 2011, Booster Packs were no longer available for sale on the NCSoft website. While costume pieces were still available in the Paragon Market under the Booster Pack names for one price, the prestige powers and emotes had been separated from the packs as an additional purchase.

=== Super Packs ===
On February 24, 2012, Heroes and Villains Super Packs were introduced to the Paragon Market after feedback from the beta release of the program was made known by the players.

=== Virtual item packs ===
A few in-game item packs were released to allow players to gain in-game items from select box releases of the game at a lower cost than repurchasing the title at retail price. Item packs only contained the items in an Edition release, and did not come with free playtime or (in the case of expansions) the added game content that require an expansion purchase in order to use.

- Good versus Evil Edition Item Pack which included a Jump Jet Travel Power, Pocket D Teleport power and special Hero/Villain-themed costume sets.
- Mac Special Edition Item Pack, which included all of the costume pieces from the Valkyrie set and the Mission Transporter power.
- Going Rogue Item Pack, which included the Alpha and Omega costume sets and the Shadowy Presence power.
- Wedding Pack: A serial code first sold on Valentine's Day, 2008, added special wedding-themed costume pieces and emotes to the game.
- Party Pack: Released in late September, 2010, which included party themed character emotes.

As of August 30, 2011 virtual item packs were no longer available for sale on the NCSoft website. The individual costume pieces and powers were available through the in-game store.

=== Holiday events ===
The City of Heroes development team also initiated events based on North American and European holidays and observances, starting with Halloween in 2004, followed by a Winter Event in 2005, and finally a Valentine's Day event in 2006.

=== Anniversary ===
City of Heroes granted a commemorative badge during its anniversary month of May and often scheduled special events and surprises during May. On the game's fifth anniversary on April 28, 2009, and on the same day during the sixth anniversary for 2010, an outbreak of Giant Monsters of every type was released throughout the game in all zones for players to defeat within a 24-hour span.

=== City of Hero ===
A Korean open beta of City of Heroes, entitled City of Hero (시티 오브 히어로, Siti Obeu Hieoro), was launched on January 18, 2006. However, the game's official release was cancelled. The Korean CoH team directed its players to a coupon for an account on the US servers as compensation.

== Servers ==
City of Heroes and City of Villains employed several servers. The servers were divided between the North American and European markets, with separate European servers with language localization for German and French speakers. The North American servers were based in Dallas, Texas, while the European servers were moved from Germany to a new site in the US in November 2010.

== Reception ==
Reception

Aggregate scores
Aggregator	Score
GameRankings	85%
Metacritic	85/100

In the United States, City of Heroes sold 330,000 copies ($13.8 million) by August 2006, after its release in April 2004. It was the country's 53rd best-selling computer game between January 2000 and August 2006.

In 2004, Computer Gaming World hailed the game, saying, "City of Heroes blows a superpowered gust of fresh air into an increasingly stale sword-and-sorcery MMO world."

In 2009, IGN, The Escapist, and Allakhazam praised City of Heroes: Architect Edition, which added the ability to create missions.

The game received additional praise because the characters of inactive players were not deleted, even if the player's subscription had been canceled or inactive for an extended period of time. In anticipation of the release of City of Villains, Cryptic announced on October 10, 2005, that effective October 24, 2005, characters below level 35 on accounts that had been unpaid and inactive for more than ninety days would have their names flagged as unreserved allowing new users to take the name. The character itself was left untouched, and a player who lost his character's name was given the option to choose a new one. This policy was suspended on May 4, 2006, because Cryptic's data-mining had shown that very few names were being taken in this fashion anymore; Cryptic said thirty days' notice would be given prior to future changes to the name policy. On July 31, 2007, Cryptic announced that the name policy would go back into effect as of August 29, 2007, but would apply only to characters under level 6.

=== Awards ===
Computer Games Magazine named City of Heroes the ninth-best computer game of 2004. The editors wrote, "In a genre dominated by games that try to be all things to all people and end up doing nothing particularly well, it's particularly refreshing." It received runner-up placements in GameSpot's 2004 "Best Massively Multiplayer Online Game" and "Most Surprisingly Good Game" award categories. During the 8th Annual Interactive Achievement Awards, the Academy of Interactive Arts & Sciences nominated City of Heroes for "Computer Game of the Year", "Massively Multiplayer/Persistent World Game of the Year", "Outstanding Innovation in Computer Gaming", and "Outstanding Achievement in Game Design". At the following year's awards ceremony, the expansion City of Villains won the "Massively Multiplayer Game of the Year" award outright (tied with Guild Wars).

- Ten Ton Hammer: Best Community of 2012
- GameSpot: PC Game of the Month—May 2004

== Subscription ==
As in most other MMORPGs at the time, players were required to subscribe to City of Heroes by paying the publisher (NCsoft) a monthly fee to continue playing City of Heroes. Portions of the subscription costs went to supporting a full-time "live" team, which developed additional content for the game; other portions supported the significant server maintenance and bandwidth costs.

Continuing active subscriptions were also entitled to "Veteran Rewards". The system rewarded players with costume pieces, extra powers, supergroup base items, respec opportunities, and other minor in-game perks to all characters (both hero and villain characters) on any server tied to the active subscription. Inactive accounts did not accrue time for Veteran Rewards.

As of September, 2008, City of Heroes had around 124,939 subscribers in the US & Europe, according to financial reports released by NCsoft in November 2008.

On June 20, 2011, City of Heroes announced the City of Heroes: Freedom subscription model, which was implemented in September, 2011. The servers were free-to-play, with limitations on what Free players could access. Players who had their subscriptions lapse would become Premium players, and would have access to everything they used to have, but would be limited to what they would be able to access in the game's future updates unless they signed up for a VIP subscription. The VIP subscription added free access to the Going Rogue game content, and a monthly VIP Rewards system (as opposed to the quarterly releases of the Veteran Rewards). There was also an in-game market where all players could purchase points to purchase expansions to the game; VIP subscribers were given a monthly stipend of these points at no extra charge.

== Other media ==
=== Novels ===
The first City of Heroes novel, The Web of Arachnos, by Robert Weinberg, was published by CDS Books (an imprint of the Perseus Publishing Group) in October, 2005. The novel chronicles the back stories of the Statesman and Lord Recluse, the central iconic characters in the City of Heroes and City of Villains franchises. A second novel, The Freedom Phalanx, written by Robin Laws, was released in May, 2006, and detailed the re-formation of the hero team the Freedom Phalanx in the 1980s. The story centers on the fledgling heroes Positron and Synapse, but also includes Manticore, Sister Psyche, and Statesman. The book's villains include Lord Recluse, Doctor Null, Shadow Queen, and Revenant. Artist George Pérez provided the covers for the first two novels, as well as lending his name to one of the early areas of the game itself, Perez Park. A third novel titled The Rikti War was announced by CDS at the time the first novel was published, with an August 2006, scheduled release date. The book was reportedly going to cover the epic trans-dimensional war between Earth and the Rikti home world, however the book was later cancelled. James Lowder served as editor and packager of the City of Heroes novels for CDS.

=== Comic books ===
To tie in with the game, NCsoft released two original comic book series that featured various characters from within the games themselves. The original series by publisher Blue King featured the heroes/roommates Apex and War Witch with their neighbor Horus. The later series from publisher Top Cow featured signature heroes and villains from both City of Heroes and City of Villains such as Statesman, Positron, Lord Recluse, and Ghost Widow, along with scripts by well-known comic book creators Mark Waid, Troy Hickman, and Dan Jurgens. Both series were originally free for subscribers to the games, but later they were provided for an extra subscription fee with the game and for free in digital format afterwards on the official City of Heroes website. The Blue King series ran for 12 issues, after which the Top Cow series ran for an additional 20 issues, ending in July 2007.

=== Collectible card game ===
Alderac Entertainment Group also worked with CoH to create a collectible card game featuring characters from the game, as well as several original characters. The game's website also allowed players to create a game-compliant card for their own online character.

=== Role-playing game ===
The City of Heroes team worked with Eden Studios, Inc. to create a tabletop role-playing game based on the game. While a free preview version of the game was released, the game was indefinitely delayed due to the cancellation license with Fox on their Buffy the Vampire Slayer and Angel role-playing games. Eden owner George Vasilakos later made a statement in 2008 that they were waiting on information from the copyright holders, but no news arose after this date.

=== Heroclix ===
The various collector's editions of City of Heroes and City of Villains included exclusive HeroClix figures of signature characters from the game. These included Statesman (without a cape), Manticore, Ghost Widow, Lord Recluse, Positron, Black Scorpion and Mako. There was also a separate, Limited Edition version of Statesman wearing a cape.

=== Film and television ===
In June 2007, it was announced that the producer for the Transformers film, Tom DeSanto, had acquired the option to make movies and television shows based on the City of Heroes franchise. In February 2008, it was announced that DeSanto had indeed begun preparations for the film. A plot summary had been released detailing that the movie itself takes place during the first Rikti War.

== Lawsuit ==
In November 2004, Marvel Comics filed a lawsuit against City of Heroes developer Cryptic Studios, publisher NCsoft, and game administrator NC Interactive (NCI), alleging that the game not only allowed, but actively promoted, the creation of characters who infringe copyrights and trademarks owned by Marvel. The suit sought unspecified damages and an injunction halting further sales and shutting down the game.

The game included in its user agreement strong language against such activity, however. It forbade the creation of potentially infringing characters, and NCI had been known to rename or "genericize" such characters. The User Agreement additionally held players accountable to indemnify (reimburse) NCI and its affiliates against third-party infringement claims, and demanded either a granting of sole ownership in player created content, including characters, to NCI, or a warranty that a third party owner of the rights in player created content had made such a grant.

Marvel subsequently admitted that some of the allegedly infringing characters cited in the complaint had been created by Marvel's own investigators. In March 2005, the court struck those exhibits from the complaint. The court also dismissed with prejudice some of Marvel's claims. The dismissed claims included all indirect trademark infringement counts, because Marvel had not pleaded commercial use of Marvel's marks by the game's players. Commercial use is a required element of infringement under American trademark statutes.

On December 12, 2005, all remaining claims were settled under undisclosed terms. The game's operators asserted that the settlement did not require changes to the character creation engine.

Despite the litigation, in October 2006, Marvel Comics selected Cryptic Studios to develop its own superhero MMORPG for Windows and Xbox Live, titled Marvel Universe Online. The alliance surprised players, but developer Matt "Positron" Miller assured fans on Cryptic's official website that development and maintenance would continue separately on both games, proved later by the complete split between City of Heroes and Cryptic Studios. Marvel Universe Online was eventually cancelled by Microsoft.

== Acquisition and new studio ==
On November 6, 2007, NCsoft announced that it would assume ownership of both City of Heroes and City of Villains. As part of a push to further develop City of Heroes, the company also announced the formation of a new development studio dedicated to new titles as well as their interest in distributing and administering their future works once launched. This new team was centered on key members of the Cryptic and NCsoft City of Heroes/Villains teams who accepted the NCsoft offer to join their new studio in Northern California. The sale of the City of Heroes IP granted Cryptic Studios the freedom to work on its new superhero MMORPG (at this time, an RPG/Action hybrid) Champions Online without concerns of conflict of interest.

Shortly after having acquired full ownership of the property, NCsoft granted all existing and former City of Heroes account holders access to both games (City of Heroes and City of Villains).

== Sources ==
- City of Heroes, PRIMA Official Game Guide, Chris McCubbin and Christopher Pinckard, Prima Games (2004). ISBN 0-7615-4516-6
- City of Heroes Binder, PRIMA Official Game Guide, Eric Mylonis, Prima Games (2005), ISBN 0-7615-5205-7
- City of Heroes/City of Villains Bind, Macro & Emote Guide, "Shenanigunner" (2006–2009, updated regularly)
