= Magic: Legends =

- Developer: Cryptic Studios
- Publisher: Perfect World Entertainment
- Platforms: Microsoft Windows (early access); PlayStation 4, Xbox One (cancelled)
- Release: Cancelled; March 2021 (early access)
- Genre: Action role-playing game
- Modes: Single-player, multiplayer

Magic: Legends is a cancelled action role-playing video game based on the Magic: The Gathering collectible card game. It was developed by Cryptic Studios and published by Perfect World Entertainment. The game began an open beta for Microsoft Windows in March 2021, with plans for open release later that year as a free-to-play title on Windows, PlayStation 4, and Xbox One. The game's development ceased and the servers were shut down on October 31 of the same year.

== Gameplay ==
Magic: Legends would have been an action role-playing game (RPG) similar to Diablo, where the player directs their character by pointing and clicking to locations on screen to either move, attack opponents, or use special abilities as they complete missions. In following the Magic: The Gathering (MTG) canon, each player takes the role of a new Planeswalker, one gifted in the ability to draw mana from the lands to cast spells, and to travel between worlds of the multiverse. Initially the player selects a Planeswalker type based on the five schools or colors of magic from MTG, which also describes their base attack and abilities. As the player-character grows, they gain spell cards that define additional abilities or can summon creatures to help fight; these cards are based on actual cards from MTG, but they are drawn randomly from a deck of twelve that the player assembles before setting out on a mission, with four cards available at any time. Once a player casts one of these cards, the card is placed back into the deck and a new card automatically drawn to fill the slot. In addition, the player must gather sufficient mana to cast the spells. Mana regenerates slowly over time as well as dropped by enemies, and if the player opts to include cards from different schools, the mana drops will be randomly generated in proportion to the card colors in their deck, meaning that the player may need to wait for the right colored mana to appear before casting some spells. However, mixing cards from different schools can create powerful in-game combinations, as with the card game itself, and the game gives the player the opportunity to tune their deck to find successful mixes of cards.

Between missions, the player interacts at a base hub to gear up for missions, rework their deck, and use in-game currency to purchase new gear or cards as well as to unlock the other Planeswalker characters. The game uses free-to-play model that will allow players to spend real-world funds as to buy items that otherwise may require a high cost of in-game currency. The game's universe consists of many overworlds based on the various planes of Magic's multiverse, during which players will be having random public encounters with various enemies alongside other players, visit quest-givers and shops, and other functions. Various portals lead to single or small-team quest instances; these can be configured to be more difficult with various modifiers as to drop better rewards if the quest is completed successfully. Rewards from both overworld and instanced quests include in-game currency, character gear, and scrolls for the cards in their currently equipped deck. Cards with enough scrolls can be upgraded to more powerful versions, limited by the player's own Planeswalker's experience level.

== Development ==
Magic: Legends was being developed by Cryptic Studios and published by Perfect World Entertainment. The two had previously developed Neverwinter, a similar action RPG based on the Dungeons & Dragons property for Wizards of the Coast, who also owns the MTG property. The game was first announced in June 2017, though untitled at that point, and originally billed as a massively multiplayer online role-playing game (MMORPG). The game was formally revealed as Magic: Legends at The Game Awards 2019 in December. At this point, Cryptic clarified that the game would be a massively multiplayer online (MMO) action RPG.

The game was planned for full release on Microsoft Windows, PlayStation 4, and Xbox One in 2021, starting with an open beta release on March 23 for Windows computers. Cryptic Studios stated that this was a soft launch and had no plan to wipe the servers when they considered the game ready for full release.

Cryptic and Perfect Worlds announced in June that Magic: Legends will be shut down on October 31, and cancelled planned releases for consoles. The game's director, Stephen Ricossa said that the "vision for Magic: Legends missed the mark" in the announcement, and had no anticipation to return to the game in the future. The in-game microtransaction shop was shut down immediately and all money spent refunded to players.
