= Dockers (brand) =

American brand of garments

- Industry: Clothing
- Founded: 1986; 40 years ago
- Headquarters: San Francisco, California, U.S.
- Parent: Levi Strauss & Co. (1986-2025); Authentic Brands Group (2025-present)
- Website: www.dockers.com

Dockers is an American brand of garments and other accessories originally from Levi Strauss & Co.

Levi Strauss & Co., then specializing in denim, introduced the Dockers brand in 1986. Dockers became a leading brand of business casual clothing for men under the leadership of Bob Siegel. In 1987, Dockers introduced a women's line. In 1993 the Dockers brand was introduced into Europe under the leadership of Joe Middleton.

Dockers makes belts, pants, leather wallets, shoes and other apparel.

== History ==
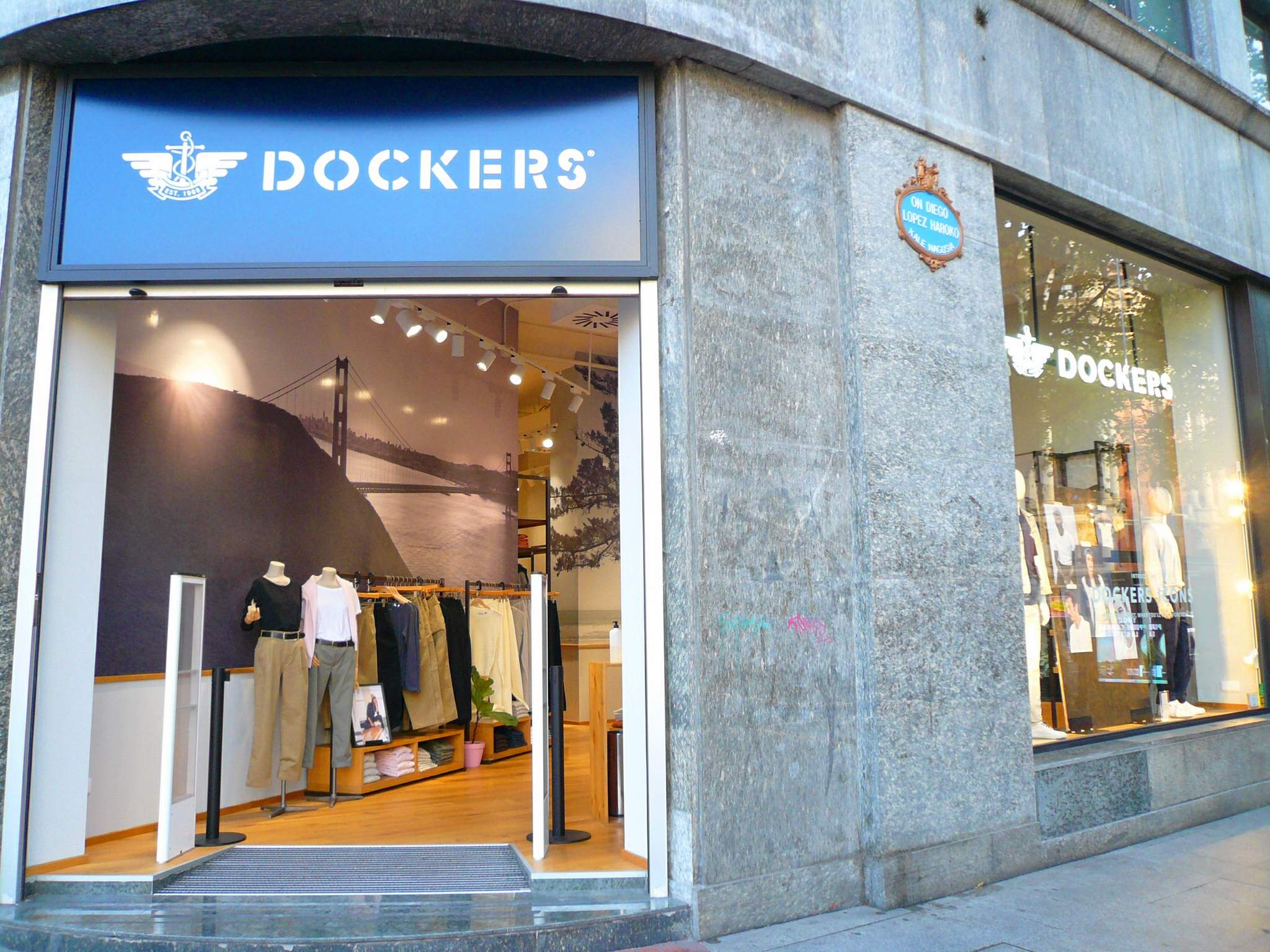
Dockers' store in Bilbao (Spain)

In 1853, Levi Strauss landed in San Francisco after leaving his home of Bavaria. After getting his business going, he resumed selling goods to the American people. Some of the goods he sold included clothes and footwear.

Still in the early 1900s, khaki color chino cloth trousers, known as "khakis", become domestic and are worn for “classier” occasions. All the while, undergoing a few label changes. 1916 marks the creation of the label Levi Strauss Make, which khakis then fell under. In the 1920s, Levi Strauss and Co. began producing women’s khakis made specifically for outdoor activity and comfort. By the late 1920s, khaki underwent another label change and now falls under the “Two Horse Brand”.

In 1963, the company opened its first warehouse below the Mason–Dixon line. The new factory was in Blackstone, Virginia. The late 1900s consisted of major moves on a business level for Levi Strauss and Co.

Khakis were more widely worn in the US when “casual Fridays” gained popularity in offices in the late 1980s, and led to the emergence of Dockers as a popular brand.

Before going global in 1992, characters from the television series Cheers were prominently wearing Dockers clothing in the late 1980s, and Dockers made an appearance on an episode of the television series Seinfeld.

In the 2000s, the company started producing denim and continued to expand into different countries.

In May 2025, Levi Strauss agreed to sell Dockers for $311 million to brand management firm Authentic Brands Group.

== 2009 change of focus ==
In 2009, Dockers as a subsidiary overhauled its corporate structure and product assortment in a strategy to try to revitalize their core competency, which is the khaki pants. According to Jim Calhoun, former president of Dockers, “The brand is going back to focusing on what we do best: khaki pants for men." Dockers is trying to boost the selling of khaki pants, as it is a declining product among consumers. The reason for this decline in sales is the fact that people view khakis as a more corporate and office article of clothing.

The brand tried to revamp the pants by new marketing strategies. They emphasized the "Dockers lifestyle" by showing ads depicting the various products for work, dress, casual weekends, and golf. According to Levi's global chief marketing officer Jen Sey, the global vice president of marketing for Dockers, “we lost our focus by going after women and trying to incorporate head-to-toe dressing."

== 2010 campaign ==
In January 2010, the Dockers brand launched a cross-channel advertising campaign with the tagline "Wear The Pants." The campaign premiered during the 2010 Super Bowl, and was the first Super Bowl advertisement to offer an exclusive, limited-time online offer for viewers. The ad also featured "I Wear No Pants" by the Poxy Boggards.

The Dockers campaign tagline, "Wear The Pants" was marketed as a call to masculinity for men. The campaign incorporated outside sources to incite men to reclaim their lost male-aesthetic. Along with a new campaign message, the Dockers brand has since revitalized their product line as well, featuring several new styles aimed at a younger, status-seeker consumer. The Dockers brand has also partnered with Habitat for Humanity as their charitable cause.
