= Poxy Boggards =

American folk band

- Origin: Pasadena, California
- Genres: Folk
- Years active: 1994 – present
- Label: Angry Folk
- Members: Stuart Venable; Jerry Wheeler; Greg Wilson; Steven Schwadron; Sean Mitchell; Phil Schwadron; Adam Liebreich-Johnsen; Joey Nestra; Jon Enge; Garrett Brown
- Past members: Bill Roper; Johnnie Breen; Bob Moseley; Bruce Penner; Jonathan Reilly; Nick Krall; Andrew McLean; David Gotcher; Tim Graffham; Matt Cadwallader; Tracy W. Bush; Wes Wright; Ian Voyagis; Tim Cadell; Matthew Weatherston; Casey Conner

The Poxy Boggards are an American folk band based in Pasadena. The band was founded in 1994 by Stuart Venable and Bill Roper, and first performed that year at the Southern California Renaissance Pleasure Faire. Since that time, they have achieved success in the re-burgeoning Irish-folk movement, playing with bands such as The Fenians. The 13 members of the band are all singers and instrumentalists. Their music has been described as a mix of tight, right harmonies, rocking instrumentation with traditional folk instruments, and an irreverent, often shocking sense of humor and lack of decorum.

The Boggards have played at numerous venues throughout Southern California, including the Galaxy Theatre, the House of Blues in Anaheim, the El Rey Theatre in Los Angeles, and the Musicians Institute in Hollywood.

At the 2006 Just Plain Folks Music Awards, they received Best Celtic Album for Liver Let Die and Live Act of the Year for their 2004 performance at the awards show.

On Sunday, February 7, 2010, one of the Poxy Boggards' songs ("I Wear No Pants" from their CD Liver Let Die) was featured in a commercial for the Levi Strauss brand Dockers which aired during Super Bowl XLIV. The song was also featured in the Shazam app's combined promotion with Dockers.

In June 2010, the band received the 2010 Hollywood Fringe Festival Award for Music.

In October 2016, the band appeared on Hell's Kitchen.

== Video games ==
During Roper's tenure at the gaming company Blizzard, the music of the Poxy Boggards was featured in the game Warcraft II: Tides of Darkness.

Roper was also the CEO of Flagship Studios, makers of Hellgate: London and Mythos, where several members of the band did voice-over work for Mythos.

The Song "Bring Us More Beer" was re-recorded by Stu Venable, Bill Roper, Heather Green, and Elspeth Golden as an instrumental track re-titled "Bring Us More" for the Pirates of the Caribbean play set in Disney Infinity.

== Hidden tracks and guest artists ==
Early in their career, the hidden track from their first CD was played on the Dr. Demento show. "Inbred Local" was a thematic departure from their Renaissance-inspired music and set a trend for including a hidden track at the end of many of their albums released under the Angry Folk label.

On their fourth album, Liver, Let Die, guest artists are listed as "Proxy Boggards".

== Discography ==
- Bawdy Parts – Original and Traditional Songs of Drinking and Revelry (1996)
- Barley Legal – More Songs About Women and Beer (2000)
- Lager Than Life – Songs of Excess and Debauchery (2002)
- Liver Let Die – Celebrating Ten Years of Behaving Badly (2004)
- Whiskey Business (2006)
- Anchor Management (2008)
- Bitter & Stout (2009)
- I Wear No Pants: the EP (2010)
- Live in Consort (2011) – live album
- Wish You Were Beer (2012)
- Beer and Loathing (2015)
- Atlas Chugged (2018)
- Songs of Vice and Ire (2020)
- Triskaidickaphobia (2023)
- Blood, Sweat and Beers Pt. 1 (2026)
