= Conceal =

Conceal means to hide or cover something from view.

Conceal, consealed, consealer, or consealment may refer to:

- Conceal evidence, in criminology and psychology
- Concealed carry, carrying a hidden weapon in public
- Concealed shoes, superstitious charms
- Concealed ovulation, in biology
- Concealed rules, intentionally hidden rules in a game
- Concealer moth, an insect family
- Fraudulent concealment, a common law doctrine

== Technology ==
- Concealer, a cosmetic used to mask skin imperfections
- Concealment device, a safety and security device
- Ideal Conceal, a pocket pistol

== Film and music ==
- Concealed (album), a 2004 progressive rock music album by Augury
- Concealed (film), a 2017 thriller film
- The Concealed, a 2012 jazz avantgarde music album by John Thorn
- The Concealers, a 2009 death metal music album by Dååth
