= City of Heroes Collectible Card Game =

Collectable card game

- The "Ms. Liberty" card from the City of Heroes Collectible Card Game
- Designers: David Williams
- Publishers: Alderac Entertainment Group
- Players: 2
- Playing time: Approx. 30 minutes
- Chance: Some
- Age range: 9+
- Skills: Card playing Arithmetic; Basic Reading Ability

The City of Heroes Collectible Card Game is an out-of-print trading card game based on the discontinued NCSoft MMORPG, City of Heroes. The card game was designed by David Williams, the designer responsible for other games such as Legend of the Five Rings. The initial product release from Alderac Entertainment Group was in January 2006. The City of Heroes CCG was discontinued in February 2007 as it "did not reach critical mass" according to AEG CEO John Zinser.

== Gameplay summary ==
Players took on the role of superheroes, testing themselves against other superheroes in the arena of Paragon City. Players took turns performing a single action, until only one hero remained standing; that player was the winner.

Players could take the following actions:

- Power Up - Put a new Power, Enhancement, or Sidekick into play.
- Act - Use an action from an Edge card held in the hand, or from existing cards in play.
- Move - Move from close quarters combat to distance combat, or vice versa.
- Assemble - Call for help by searching the deck for a Sidekick, revealing that card to the opponent, and then putting it into the hand.
- Recharge - Gather strength by moving non-ready Powers one step closer to again being ready.
- Mission - Reveal a threat to the city by playing a Mission card.
- Rest - Draw two cards to replenish one's hand, while taking no further action.

The core gameplay revolved around using powers to damage opponents, while simultaneously positioning oneself favorably (by adding or upgrading powers and activating defensive powers). Because powers had to be recharged before they can be used again, it was possible to get into a state where a number of turns had to be spent simply getting back into a position from which one can again attack.

== Card types ==
The cards in the City of Heroes Collectible Card Game could be broken up into the following types:

- Heroes - The actual superhero himself (or herself). These cards define starting powers as well as other attributes (e.g. travel method, such as flight).
- Powers - The super powers which set the hero apart from others. Powers can be used to attack opponents or protect oneself.
- Enhancements - Enhances existing powers, focusing them in some unique way (for example, causing them to do more damage).
- Edges - Gaining the edge or the upper hand, these cards allow a one-time effect to occur.
- Sidekicks - Junior superheroes, able to assist as needed. Sidekicks do not enter play with any powers, but can gain them during the course of the game.
- Missions - A threat or villain terrorizing Paragon City. Such cards have a negative impact on all superheroes until defeated, at which time they turn into rewards.

Cards also featured small inspiration icons in the bottom corner. These icons represented a fixed minor effect which could be utilized by discarding the card, instead of playing it normally. Because the game had no draw phase, this mechanism had to be used with care to avoid exhausting one's hand.

== Hero types ==
Heroes were split up into five different categories or archetypes. These archetypes defined the types of powers that a hero would have and hence how a deck would be constructed. The following types of heroes existed:

- Blasters - High-offense heroes adorned with long-range powers. Capable of inflicting great damage, they often lack defense.
- Controllers - Manipulative heroes with the ability to distract or confuse their opponents.
- Defenders - Adept at helping and boosting the powers of others, Defenders can also use their powers to assist themselves.
- Scrappers - Masters of mêlée combat, these heroes are used to getting in close and fighting hand-to-hand.
- Tankers - The toughest of heroes, capable of withstanding incredible damage.

The game also allowed one to make use of a "Build your own hero card" mechanism, provided by the official website. One filled out a form, picked appropriate powers and selections, and then uploaded an image. The data was then processed into a PDF file which could be printed out and used in official play (including in tournaments). This was not considered exploitable because all heroes created using this system were presumed to be balanced appropriately.

== Products and availability ==
The City of Heroes: Arena base card set consisted of 324 unique cards. Of these, 99 were only available as part of a battle pack, 75 were common, 75 were uncommon, and 75 were rare. The following products were available for purchase:

City of Heroes Collectible Card Game Products
Product	Cards	Notes and other comments
Battle box	145	Includes 4 battle packs and 4 booster packs
Battle pack	25	Features a hero and his or her special powers
Booster pack	11	7 commons, 3 uncommons, 1 rare

The first expansion set, Secret Origins, was released in August 2006. It introduced 22 new heroes, 10 new powersets, and a new winning condition. This set was available as booster packs and as battle packs containing the new heroes.
