= FaceGen =

Facial modeling software

- Type: middleware for 3D modeling
- Website: www.facegen.com

FaceGen is a 3D face-generating 3D modeling middleware produced by Singular Inversions.

== Approach ==
Although FaceGen generates conventional 3D mesh data, it uses a "parameterized" approach to defining the properties that make up a face, and by using a fixed set of parameters it is able to morph and modify a face model independently of output resolution. FaceGen 3.3 allows the user to randomize, tween, normalize and exaggerate faces, and also includes algorithms for adjusting apparent age, ethnicity and gender. It also allows limited parametric control of facial expressions, and includes a set of phoneme expressions for the animation of characters with "speaking" roles.

FaceGen can also generate 3D models from front and side images of a face, or by analyzing a single photograph.

== Free versions ==
Free demo versions of FaceGen Artist, FaceGen 3D Print and FaceGen Modeller can be downloaded from the company's website. These allow the user to create, edit, load and save files in the program's proprietary ".fg" format. The free version features the same functionality of the paid version, except that a logo is placed on the forehead of models that are generated and only a few additional assets like hairstyles and beards are provided.

== Reception ==
Reception

Review scores
Publication	Score
Game Developer	4/5 stars
Softpedia	4/5 stars

Elena Opris of Softpedia assessed the software to be an "excellent program for creating and designing faces", although noted that the tool was intensive on system CPU and memory. Michael Dean of Game Developer commended the 2.2 version of FaceGen as a "robust package" for the customizability of its settings, the ease of creating faces that "differ greatly" from one another, and its efficiency compared to manually modelling a face. Sean Wagstaff praised the 3.0 version in a later publication for its "reasonably accurate" head models from reference photography, also citing its easy exporting process and small learning curve.
