= Fraudulent concealment =

Common law doctrine

Fraudulent concealment is a common law doctrine that may be invoked to toll a statute of limitations. Under this doctrine, if a defendant has concealed his misconduct, then the limitations period shall start from the point when the plaintiff discovers his claim, or should have discovered it with due diligence. It is similar to the equitable estoppel doctrine.

The United States Supreme Court first adopted the fraudulent concealment doctrine as a federal common law matter in the 1874 case Bailey v. Glover. The doctrine was notably raised in cases related to the Watergate scandal; E. Howard Hunt unsuccessfully invoked it in a malpractice suit against his defense lawyer, and journalist Hedrick Smith successfully used it in an illegal wiretapping case against Richard Nixon and others. Since then, it has increased in popularity.
