= Marvel Heroes (video game) =

2013 video game

- The key art for Marvel Heroes.
- Developers: Gazillion Entertainment; Secret Identity Studios
- Publisher: Gazillion Entertainment
- Engine: Unreal Engine 3
- Platforms: All versions Microsoft Windows, OS X Omega only PlayStation 4, Xbox One
- Release: June 4, 2013
- Genres: Massively multiplayer online role-playing, action role-playing
- Mode: Multiplayer

Marvel Heroes, also known as Marvel Heroes 2015, Marvel Heroes 2016 and Marvel Heroes Omega, was a free-to-play massively multiplayer online action role-playing video game developed by Gazillion Entertainment and Secret Identity Studios. Characters such as Iron Man, Captain America, Deadpool, and Wolverine were playable characters that could be unlocked in the game. The story was written by Brian Michael Bendis. Players who pre-purchased a game pack received early access to the game on May 29, 2013. The game was officially launched on June 4, 2013, on Microsoft Windows. An OS X version followed in November 2014. The game was renamed to Marvel Heroes 2015 on June 4, 2014. The game was renamed Marvel Heroes 2016 in January 2016.

On April 5, 2017, a console version was announced to be in production at the time for both the PlayStation 4 and Xbox One that was branded as a free-to-play game under the title Marvel Heroes Omega. This version was released on June 30, 2017.

On November 15, 2017, Disney announced that it was ending its relationship with Gazillion Entertainment and that Marvel Heroes would be shut down at the end of 2017. The game and the website for Marvel Heroes were taken offline on November 27, 2017 and Gazillion was shut down.

== Gameplay ==
Marvel Heroes allowed players to control iconic Marvel Comics heroes. Here Iron Man, Scarlet Witch and Wolverine battle an enemy robot.

The gameplay was an ARPG (action role playing game). Marvel Heroes was free-to-play with micro-transactions used to fund and support the game. Players could unlock most of the things that could be bought via real money with currencies earned in game.

As characters gained levels, they gained a passive stat (statistic) increase for stats that helped that particular character and gain power points, allowing the player to further define the abilities of that character. Each character had three power trees in which they could spend points. Each of the trees generally focused on a certain mechanic or play style, such as the Assault (melee), Firepower (guns), and Demolition (explosives) trees for Punisher, or the Archery (ranged), Fighting (melee), and Trick Arrows (special ranged) trees for Hawkeye. As the character gained levels, the player had access to more skills to spend points on and was able to put more points into existing skills. Each skill had a level cap, so more points could not be put in a skill until a certain level was reached. Each skill had a maximum of 20 power points and a maximum of 50 points could be reached from gear bonuses.

Several updates after launch rebalanced many of the game's systems. Story Mode could be used to fully level any hero, and defensive stats were consolidated and simplified. Players could obtain any playable character using the "Eternity Splinter" system. These timed drops could be used as currency with Adam Warlock so that players could obtain the heroes they wanted to play (faster than the previous random hero drop system) without spending money. In addition, the splinters could be used to get a random Cosmic item, to upgrade the character's Ultimate ability, or to purchase a Team-Up companion.

The relaunched Marvel Heroes 2015 version of the game was also the first ARPG to feature a raid. In raid encounters, 10 grouped players attacked a series of unique bosses. Each encounter featured a timer and a death limit. Raid encounters allowed players to take on, for example, Surtur and his minions in Muspelheim, and also Red Onslaught in Genosha.

Each location in the game was composed of several "instances" at any one time. This allowed the game to run on one huge virtual server, rather than the game being split into different servers. Many missions took place within smaller instances that would reset if the player left and returned.

== Plot ==
Doctor Doom obtains the Cosmic Cube, and he uses it to incinerate the Watcher. After responding to a theft at Queens, the player travels to the Raft, where Madame Hydra and Hydra have facilitated a breakout, freeing several superpowered inmates. The player manages to reactivate the security system, lock down the cell blocks, and recapture Green Goblin and Living Laser; however, many villains escape. After the breakout, Madame Hydra meets with Doom, declaring it a success. Doom gives Madame Hydra a chip with the ability to exploit a flaw in Tony Stark's security system, after which their transaction ends. After the breakout, Daredevil manages to recapture Rhino in Hell's Kitchen, while the player recaptures Shocker in an abandoned subway. Doctor Octopus tries to steal the Tablet of Life and Time from the Blood Rose nightclub, but he is stopped and recaptured by the player. The heroes temporarily gain possession of the tablet; however, Hood appears through a portal and steals it. The player then travels to Industry City, combating forces from both Advanced Idea Mechanics and Kingpin's Maggia while hunting the Hood. Eventually, Hood is defeated and taken into custody, only to reveal that he has already sold the Tablet to the Hand.

The heroes travel to Madripoor, the Hand's base of operations, and soon discover that Hydra is also attacking the Hand in an attempt to take the Tablet for themselves. The heroes subdue Madame Viper, culling the Hydra invasion, and then defeat the Hand's leader, Gorgon and his top assassin, Elektra, reclaiming the tablet. However, upon returning to New York, Kingpin uses his legal connections to force the heroes to return the Tablet to him. Knowing that the Tablet is too powerful to be left in the Kingpin's hands, the heroes work to expose his involvement in illegally smuggling Mutant Growth Hormone into the city. With the help of detective Jean DeWolff, the heroes expose the Kingpin and defeat him, finally securing the Tablet. However, shortly afterwards, the Tablet is again stolen by professional thief Ghost, who delivers it to Doctor Doom.

The heroes are then summoned to the X Mansion by Professor Charles Xavier, who explains that anti-mutant terrorists called the Purifiers have launched a genocidal attack on Mutant Town. The heroes rush to Mutant Town to stop the killings, fighting not only the Purifiers, but also the Reavers, a group of psychotic cyborg mercenaries led by Lady Deathstrike, who has allied herself with the Purifiers due to her grudge against the mutant Wolverine. The heroes fight the Purifiers back to their base in an abandoned train yard, where they discover that the Purifiers have taken advantage of the Juggernaut's hatred of Xavier in order to trick him into defending their base. The heroes subdue Juggernaut and force the Purifiers to retreat from Mutant Town. Upon returning to the X-Mansion, they are contacted by Nick Fury, who reveals that the Purifiers' leader, Reverend William Stryker, is colluding with AIM to create an anti-mutant superweapon. The heroes rush to the Purifier main base, Fort Stryker, in order to destroy the superweapon and apprehend Stryker. However, when they arrive, they find that Stryker is already under attack by Magneto and his Brotherhood of Mutants in retaliation for their attack on Mutant Town. Magneto threatens to kill Stryker, but the heroes refuse to let this happen and defeat him. As Stryker is arrested, the heroes discover that he has sold genomes from the mutants his forces captured to Mister Sinister for an unknown purpose. The heroes track Sinister to the Savage Land, which is under attack by not only Sinister's Mutate army, but also hostile tribesmen under the control of the mutant Sauron and a Brood invasion force. The heroes defeat Sinister, but he manages to escape and deliver a clone of Lucas Bishop to Doctor Doom.

The heroes are then called to the Helicarrier, where Nick Fury takes them with ending the threats of AIM and Hydra. After defeating both MODOK and the Mandarin, Doctor Doom steals one of the Mandarin's rings and reveals his master plan. It was he who originally orchestrated Hydra's attack on the Raft which led to the mass breakout of super-villains, as well as commissioned Mr. Sinister to gather mutant DNA through the Purifiers to create a clone of Bishop. The purpose of the clone is to create a conduit with which Doom can control the Cosmic Cube, while the super-villain breakout was intended to keep the heroes occupied while he finalizes his plan.

Several supervillains try to prevent the heroes from interfering with Doctor Doom's use of the Cosmic Cube. The villains fail, and the heroes are able to thwart Doom's attempt to gain omnipotence. After stopping Doctor Doom, players may travel across the Bifrost Bridge to Asgard, where Loki has summoned hordes of Dark Elves, Frost Giants, and other monsters in an attempt to seize Asgard's throne while Odin slumbers. The heroes defeat Loki's minions before confronting Loki himself in Odin's throne room where he reveals that he has stolen the power of Doom's Cosmic Cube. Eventually, the heroes defeat him. Before judgement can be passed on Loki, the heroes learn that the dark god Surtur has reforged the Twilight Sword. Surtur plans to use the chaos caused by Loki in order to launch his own invasion of Asgard. The heroes defeat Surtur and his minions in his home dimension of Muspelheim. Odin soon reawakens, enraged at Loki's crimes. Loki claims that he simply wanted to be acknowledged as a hero. As a punishment, Odin decides to trap Loki in an endless time loop covering the events of the game, giving him the opportunity to become a hero.

Shortly after Surtur's defeat, Professor X suddenly goes missing. While investigating his disappearance, the heroes discover that Red Skull has merged with Onslaught, becoming Red Onslaught. Onslaught has launched a genocidal campaign against the sovereign mutant nation of Genosha. In order to combat Red Onslaught, the heroes are forced to enlist the aid of supervillains through the Thunderbolts program, including Magneto and Green Goblin. The heroes and super-villains are able to defeat Red Onslaught and save Genosha, after which the Red Skull is imprisoned and Onslaught is destroyed.

Sometime later, after defeating Ultron's invasion of Manhattan, the heroes are confronted by Doctor Doom. Doom explains that he had been captured by Thanos following his initial defeat. He then reveals that the Skrulls are planning a massive invasion of Earth. The heroes are summoned by Nick Fury to the S.H.I.E.L.D. Helicarrier, only to discover that the entire base has been infiltrated by Skrulls. After defeating the Skrulls, the heroes meet with S.W.O.R.D., who escort them to the real Nick Fury's base in an abandoned toolshed in Madripoor. From there, the heroes combat Skrull activity throughout the world until discovering that the leader of the invasion, Kl'rt the Super-Skrull, has established his primary base in Madripoor's Hightown. The heroes confront Super-Skrull and defeat him. As he is taken into custody, his ship manages to escape. Thereupon, Super-Skrull exclaims that the heroes should be thankful because of its cargo. Sure enough, the ship is revealed to be carrying an Infinity Gem, catching the attention of Thanos.

== Characters ==
Marvel Heroes features more than 100 characters from the Marvel Universe. Players can choose from a large and diverse cast of superheroes and villains. Each playable character is a different archetype, either Melee or Ranged with each having unique sets of attributes and talent trees. At the game's release, there were 21 playable characters. As of July 2017, there were 63 playable characters. These characters range from well-known and iconic such as Iron Man and Spider-Man to lesser-known and obscure ones such as Squirrel Girl. Several villains, such as Loki and Venom, also appear as playable characters.

Every player can play all heroes up to level 10, with the exception of the hero most recently added to the game. Players may continue to level up the heroes of their choice by spending an in-game currency called Eternity Splinters or by purchasing them with real money via the game's store. Once a hero is unlocked, they may reach a maximum level of 60, at which point they may access all of the game's content.

Players can also unlock Team-Up characters, a concept based on the Marvel Team-Up comic book series. While these characters are not playable, they may be summoned to act as sidekicks or bodyguards, providing assistance and boosting the playable character. Team-Ups can be acquired using Eternity Splinters or via the game's store.

Costumes to change the character's appearance can be acquired in the game's web store, as drops from enemies, or through crafting. Four costumes (consisting of Iron Man 3-inspired Iron Man armor, a Weapon X outfit for Wolverine, Hulk's future form Maestro, and Spider-Man's black symbiote costume) are exclusive to players who purchased the limited edition character Ultimate Pack for nearly US$200, under Gazillion's Founder's Program. An "enhanced costume" is an iteration of a playable character, but it is based on a completely different (though usually related) character. For example, Beta Ray Bill is an enhanced costume for Thor; although he has his own unique appearance and voice work, he has the same exact powers, talents and abilities as Thor. On September 9, 2016, the game achieved a Guinness World Record for having the most superhero costumes from the comics in a game. Enhanced costumes may also be an alternate version of a character, in which case they still require additional voice-over work. Examples include Thing's Angir, Breaker of Souls appearance from the Fear Itself storyline and Gambit's appearance as the Horseman of Death.

As of July 1, 2017, the Fantastic Four characters (Mr. Fantastic, Invisible Woman, Human Torch, Thing, and Silver Surfer) and all FF-related alternate costumes for various other characters were no longer available to purchase in the shop. After the announcement of Disney's end contract with Gazillion on November 15, 2017, all character packs which contained the pack exclusive costumes were removed from the online shop, but could still be purchased in-game with any player-remaining currencies.

== Development ==
=== Cryptic Studios ===
Marvel Heroes was originally known as Marvel Universe Online and later Marvel Universe. Marvel Universe Online was the original working title of Champions Online. The massively-multiplayer online (MMO) game was developed by Cryptic Studios and was to be published by Microsoft Game Studios for Microsoft Windows using a license from Marvel. The project was changed on February 11, 2008 due to what a Microsoft spokesperson referred to as "an inability to compete" with the current MMO marketplace. Less than a week later, Cryptic Studios announced that development would continue using a new intellectual property license related to Champions, a superhero role playing game.

Confirmation of the project's cancellation arrived on February 11, 2008, although rumors of the possible cancellation had existed since November of the previous year. Shane Kim, the head of Microsoft Games Studios, stated in an interview that the cancellation was primarily due to the competitive market for subscription-based MMOs, and that while one current MMO was successful, "everything else wouldn't meet our level or definition of commercial success".

=== Gazillion Entertainment ===
On March 17, 2009, it was revealed that Gazillion Entertainment had signed an exclusive 10-year deal to develop Marvel Entertainment games, of which Marvel Universe is one. The first title released was Marvel Super Hero Squad Online, which targets younger audiences. Marvel Universe was eventually renamed Marvel Heroes and started being developed as a massively multiplayer online-action role-playing game rather than a massively multiplayer online role-playing game like Cryptic's canceled version of Marvel Universe had been. Gazillion Entertainment has chosen to use Epic Games's Unreal Engine 3, instead of the Unity 3D engine used for Marvel Super Hero Squad Online, with studio director Jeff Lind stating "We love Unreal Engine 3's streaming system. It's made our entire technical approach possible and is easy to work with. We also love the flexibility we get from the actor components, which have empowered us to make all kinds of customizations without sacrificing the built-in features of the engine." During a live stream session David Brevik, the President/CEO of Gazillion, further detailed the game's engine. He noted that while Unreal Engine 3 powers the game's front end visuals and audio, much of the components that make a massively multiplayer game were written using entirely new code that interfaced with Unreal Engine 3.

During development, Gazillion used an internal team of 75 people working for three and a half years, with others assisting with support and marketing. Gazillion has raised more than $80 million to fund the game's development, but it hasn't disclosed exactly how much was spent. In contrast to other MMO developers, Gazillion always planned to use the free-to-play model.

== Closure ==
David Brevik left Gazillion on January 6, 2016, citing he was pursuing other opportunities. CEO Dave Dohrmann took over as President of Gazillion Entertainment. On October 20, 2017, missed updates became apparent to players when promised releases did not make the deadline. An annual Halloween event did not occur during 2017, and a tie-in to the recent Marvel Cinematic Universe movie Thor: Ragnarok was not made, both of which were promised semi-annual content. Employees, including designers and community representatives, were stepping down as the CEO faced allegations of harassment from co-workers and associates.

On November 15, 2017, Disney announced that it was ending its relationship with Gazillion Entertainment and that Marvel Heroes games would be shut down at the end of 2017. Around the same day of Disney's announcement concerning Gazillion, Marvel Heroes Omega was removed from the PlayStation Network, but the game server was still playable for those who already downloaded the game from the PSN's online store earlier.

On November 23, it was revealed that Marvel Heroes would instead shut down a month earlier than promised and that all employees of Gazillion have been let go without pay before Thanksgiving, including the termination of all benefits, medical and earned time off. This was due to Gazillion being liquidated by its debtors after Disney pulled their license. On November 27, 2017, the game servers and website were taken offline shortly after 11 A.M. Pacific Time. Due to the closure announcement of Marvel Heroes, many players who purchased the game's purchasable content demanded refunds. PlayStation 4 users (particularly non-European users) who purchased the game's purchasable contents in the online store between August 17, 2017 and October 17, 2017 received refunds and Xbox users received full refunds.

== Reception ==
Reception

Aggregate score
Aggregator	Score
Metacritic	PC: 58/100; PC (2015): 81/100; PS4: 83/100; XONE: 68/100

Review score
Publication	Score
IGN	PC: 5.7/10

Marvel Heroes received mixed reviews upon release; on the aggregate review website Metacritic the game attains an overall score of 58 out of 100 based on 38 critic reviews. IGN gave the game a 5.7/10, praising the story but criticizing the combat and limited customization. The game was relaunched later with the title "Marvel Heroes 2015", following various improvements and new content implemented over time. On Metacritic, the game attains a score of 81 out of 100 based on 10 critic reviews. In January 2015, Marvel Heroes 2015 won a poll of site visitors for "Most Improved MMO" on MMORPG.com.
