= Heatwave Interactive =

Video game developer

- Industry: Video games
- Founded: February 1, 2007
- Headquarters: Austin, Texas, U.S.
- Key people: Mykel Mitchell (CEO); Anthony Williams (SVP Of Operations); Michael Tomas (COO); Michael Gibson (VP); Kai Steinmann (VP of Development)
- Products: iSamJackson; Platinum Life series; Gods & Heroes: Rome Rising; Eternal Knights
- Website: heatwave.com

Heatwave Interactive is an Austin, Texas based video game developer founded in 2007 by M. Tomas, Anthony Castoro, and Donn Clendenon.

== Titles ==
Heatwave has developed games and apps for several platforms:

- iSamJackson, an application featuring voice clips of Samuel L. Jackson for the iPhone, iPod Touch and iPad
- The Platinum Life series of music industry role-playing games for social media sites
- Gods & Heroes: Rome Rising, an MMORPG for Windows PCs
- Eternal Knights, an unreleased horror/suspense property
