= Cryptic Studios =

Video game developing company

- Type: Private
- Industry: Video games
- Founded: 2000; 26 years ago
- Founders: Michael Lewis; Rick Dakan; Bruce Rogers; Matt Harvey; Cameron Petty
- Headquarters: Los Gatos, California
- Key people: Jack Emmert (CEO)
- Products: City of Heroes; Champions Online; Star Trek Online; Neverwinter
- Number of employees: 136 (2021)
- Parent: Atari SA (2008–2011); Perfect World Entertainment (2011–2022); The Gearbox Entertainment Company (2022–2024); Embracer Group (2024–2025); Project Golden Arc (2025–present)
- Website: www.crypticstudios.com

Cryptic Studios is an American video game developer specializing in massively multiplayer online role-playing games. It is headquartered in Los Gatos, California, and is owned by Project Golden Arc, a company that also manages Arc Games after a management buyout from Embracer Group.

== History ==
Cryptic Studios logo, 2000–2007

Established in June 2000, Michael Lewis and Rick Dakan conceived the idea for Cryptic Studios. "Rick and I wanted to do an online role-playing game," Lewis told the Los Gatos Weekly Times in January 2007. "We'd been role-playing gamers growing up, and thought that online would be a great way to continue that experience, while overcoming the distances involved. We decided that there were too many fantasy games in development—this was 1999, so we discussed many alternatives. Superheroes quickly rose to the top of the list. It is something people could understand and identify with quickly, versus ideas like science fiction or horror, because it provides an infinite background on which to create adventures of all kinds. And who doesn't want to have super powers?"

At a New Year's party in 1999, Lewis and Dakan met Bruce Rogers, Matt Harvey and Cameron Petty, veterans of Atari Games, who had begun trying to found a computer game company but lacked funding. In 2000, Lewis sold his company, Stellar Semiconductor, Inc., to Broadcom Corporation. With Lewis' funding and Rogers' expertise, the group formed Cryptic Studios. Role-playing game writer Jack Emmert joined the team to work on game design. In March 2007, Cryptic Studios moved to a larger corporate headquarters in Los Gatos, California. Plans for the new headquarters include adding a state-of-the-art sound studio to be built by the Walters-Storyk Design Group. At that time the company also adopted a new corporate logo.

On December 9, 2008, Atari, SA announced that it had acquired Cryptic Studios. In March 2010, Bill Roper was promoted to Chief Creative Officer, succeeding Emmert (who became the Chief Operations Officer), but left the studio in August that same year. In March 2011, Jack Emmert was promoted to chief executive officer when John Needham left to pursue other opportunities in the gaming industry. On May 17, 2011, Atari announced the divesting of its interest in Cryptic Studios. On May 31, 2011, it was announced that Perfect World had acquired Cryptic Studios. On April 25, 2012, Cryptic Studios announced that the security of one of its user databases was compromised as far back as December 2010. In June 2017, the company was announced to be creating a Magic: The Gathering game for consoles and PC.

In December 2021, Swedish holding company Embracer Group announced that it would acquire the North American and publishing arms of Perfect World Entertainment from Perfect World Europe through its Gearbox Software subsidiary. Following the acquisition, Perfect World Entertainment was dissolved into Gearbox Publishing. Cryptic will continue operations as a subsidiary of The Gearbox Entertainment Company. Cryptic Studios now has over 100 employees.

In November 2023, restructuring efforts at Embracer Group led to layoffs at Cryptic Studios. In March 2024, it was announced that DECA Games would be taking over direct development of Cryptic's current titles, with Cryptic transitioning into a support role. In March 2024, Embracer sold Gearbox to an external investor but announced it would retain several related studios, including Cryptic Studios.

On November 26, 2025, it was announced that Arc Games and Cryptic Studios will be divested in a management buyout, under Arc Games' management by a company named Project Golden Arc with support from a Hong Kong-listed company XD Inc.

== Products ==
=== City of Heroes/Villains ===
In early 2002, Cryptic signed a publishing agreement for City of Heroes with NCSoft, which wanted to expand into the United States gaming market. Cryptic Studios' first MMORPG, City of Heroes, was launched on April 28, 2004. On October 31, 2005, it launched City of Villains, a separate game that was linked with City of Heroes through player versus player combat zones. As of November 2007, Cryptic Studios had released ten free expansions for City of Heroes and City of Villains. On November 6, 2007, Cryptic announced that it had sold the City of Heroes/City of Villains intellectual property to NCSoft. All of the City of Heroes/City of Villains development team transitioned to work under NCSoft under the working title NCNorCal (NCNC), which later became the NCSoft-owned subsidiary, Paragon Studios, which ceased operation when NCSoft closed the game on August 31, 2012.

=== Champions Online ===
On September 27, 2006, Marvel Entertainment and Cryptic announced that Cryptic Studios was developing Marvel Universe Online, the Marvel universe MMO video game to be published by Microsoft Game Studios for exclusive release to Windows Vista (and Xbox 360, which was later cancelled in March 2010). On February 7, 2008, Shane Kim of Microsoft Game Studios reported that MUO was canceled. Cryptic Studios said development would continue using a new IP license of The Champions and became Champions Online. Cryptic Studios released Champions Online, loosely based on a superhero-based role-playing game, on September 1, 2009. Cryptic Studios had announced this title on February 14, 2008. It has, of February 2011, implemented a free-to-play model with optional micropayment transactions generating revenue, in addition to its traditional subscription system.

=== Star Trek Online ===
On July 27, 2008, Cryptic announced that they had acquired the license to continue development of a Star Trek based MMORPG previously developed by Perpetual Entertainment. Earlier, on March 13, 2008, Star Trek news site TrekMovie.com reported Cryptic Studios as the developer for Star Trek Online based on unnamed sources, confirming a several-weeks-old rumor. Star Trek Online was officially launched on February 2, 2010. The game resembles an action-oriented MMORPG, with combat and features divided between Space environments and Ground environments during play.

=== Neverwinter ===
In late August 2010, Atari and Cryptic announced the development of Neverwinter, a Dungeons & Dragons MMORPG. Neverwinter was released on PC in 2013, Xbox One in 2015, and PlayStation 4 in 2016.

=== Magic: Legends ===
On June 7, 2017, Cryptic announced their new project, an MMORPG based on Magic: The Gathering. It was later revealed under the name Magic: Legends.

It was announced on June 29, 2021, that the game would shut down on October 31, 2021, before the end of its open beta.

=== Other projects ===
On May 9, 2007, Cryptic Studios released the Cryptic Animation Rig (Cryptic AR), a free download that gives animators the same tools used by Cryptic to animate characters in its games. Cryptic Studios' website contains several images of concept art from one or more additional games currently in development.
