= Star Trek Online =

Massively multiplayer online role-playing game

- Cover art for Star Trek Online
- Developer: Cryptic Studios (Note: DECA Games also handled the game's development between 2024–2025)
- Publisher: Arc Games (Note: Previously published under the names Perfect World Entertainment and Gearbox Publishing San Francisco. Originally published by Atari between 2010-2011)
- Series: Star Trek
- Platforms: Microsoft Windows; PlayStation 4 Xbox One
- Release: Microsoft Windows: NA: February 2, 2010; EU: February 5, 2010; AU: February 11, 2010; OS X: WW: March 11, 2014; PlayStation 4, Xbox One: NA: September 6, 2016; EU: September 7, 2016
- Genres: Massively multiplayer online role-playing, third-person shooter, space flight simulator
- Mode: Multiplayer

Star Trek Online is a massively multiplayer online role-playing game developed by Cryptic Studios and published by Arc Games based on the Star Trek franchise. The game is set in the 25th century, 30 years after the events of Star Trek: Nemesis. Star Trek Online is the first massively multiplayer online role-playing game within the Star Trek franchise and was released for Microsoft Windows in February 2010. At launch, the game required a game purchase and a recurring monthly fee. In January 2012, it relaunched with a tier of free-to-play access available. After a public beta testing period, a version of the game was released for OS X in March 2014. Due to technical issues with the port, support for OS X ended in February 2016. It was later released on PlayStation 4 and Xbox One in September 2016. The game has received several expansions since release and has gotten mixed reviews from critics.

== Setting ==
Star Trek Online is set thirty years after the events of Star Trek: Nemesis. The alliance between the United Federation of Planets and the Klingon Empire has collapsed, and they are again at war. The Romulan Star Empire continues to deal with the fallout of the loss of their homeworld twenty-two years earlier (as shown in J. J. Abrams' Star Trek film), while the Dominion rebuilds its forces. The Borg Collective has re-emerged as a major threat. In later expansions the Vaadwaur, the Iconians, the Na'Kuhl, the Krenim, the Terran Empire, the Voth, the Undine, the Tzenkethi, the Hur'q/Drantzuli and the non-canon Aetherians are also introduced as adversaries.

== Gameplay ==
In Star Trek Online, each player acts as the captain of their own ship. Players are able to play as a starship, controlling the ship's engineering, tactical, and science systems by keyboard/mouse or using an on-screen console. Players can also "beam down" and move around as a player character in various settings with access to weapons and specific support and combat skills relating to their own characters' classes. The two combat systems are intertwined throughout the game: away-team missions feature fast-paced "run-and-gun" combat, while space combat stresses the long-term tactical aspect of combat between capital ships. Both are offered in concert with the Star Trek storyline and emphasize ship positioning to efficiently utilize shields during space combat, as well as the player's away team's positioning in consideration of flanking damage and finding various weaknesses to exploit during ground combat.

Other aspects of the game include crafting, which in its current form involves using duty officers (junior crew members) to make items, depending on the level of the school (category- such as science, beams, etc.) chosen. To raise the level of the school being researched, it is necessary to perform a research project using a crafting material. Unlike in some other MMO's, crafting is a "set-and-forget" procedure. The player will set up the project, click a button and after a specified time the task will be completed, rather than spending time actually performing the crafting.

Duty Officers can be sent on assignments (also following the "set-and-forget" method) and are not available during that time.

Characters of level 52 and higher can send any ships they have, or have had, on admiralty missions, similar to duty officer assignments but these do not use duty officers. Again, the mission is selected and a certain amount of specified time passes until the player is told it is complete, and informed whether it was successful.

=== Free-to-play ===
On September 1, 2011, Cryptic Studios announced that Star Trek Online would switch to free-to-play, but without full access to all the items. Later, it was announced that free-to-play would be starting Tuesday January 17, 2012. Free-to-play for players with existing or cancelled subscriptions began Thursday January 5.

== Development ==
Cryptic Studios officially announced the development of Star Trek Online on July 28, 2008, as a countdown timer on Cryptic's web site reached zero and the new official site was launched. A letter was sent out from Jack Emmert, the game's online producer, detailing some aspects of Cryptic's approach.

Console versions were announced several months before the release, with no specific console platform specified, but Cryptic announced that all console versions of their games are on indefinite hold due to difficulties "on the business side of things," largely referring to the fees assessed by Microsoft for their Xbox Gold premium online gaming service and the difficulty in asking a player to pay both that and the Cryptic subscription fee to play a single game. Console support, for both Microsoft Xbox One and Sony PlayStation 4 was made available in September 2016. The initial release was in North American regions, but will be rolled out to additional regions in the Americas and Europe.

Star Trek Online's closed beta test officially began when it was announced on October 22, 2009. Cryptic Studios offered guaranteed beta access to users who bought 6-month and lifetime subscriptions to Champions Online. However, the offer did not explicitly state how early in the beta process the access would be granted. Some pre-order packages included access to the 'open beta' running from January 12––26, 2010.

=== Expansion pack: Legacy of Romulus ===
Legacy of Romulus is Star Trek Online's first expansion pack, announced on March 21, 2013. A third playable faction, the Romulan Republic, was added, with the choice of Romulans or Remans (at present) as player characters, as they battle a mysterious new enemy and try to discover the secrets behind the destruction of Romulus two decades earlier. Denise Crosby, who reprised her role of Tasha Yar during STO's third anniversary, reprised her role of Tasha's daughter Sela, the Romulan Empress. Also featured is a complete leveling experience from level 1 to 50 (the current level cap) for the Romulans and for the Klingons, a Tholian reputation faction, a customizable UI, and an overhauled "traits" system.

Legacy of Romulus was released on May 21, 2013, between the Season 7 and Season 8 releases.

=== Expansion pack: Delta Rising ===
Delta Rising is Star Trek Online's second expansion, announced at the Official Star Trek Convention in Las Vegas on August 2, 2014. Cryptic had hinted of a new expansion in December 2013, with a release "late in 2014". The expansion is set in the Delta Quadrant, the main setting of Star Trek: Voyager. Tim Russ reprised his role as Admiral Tuvok, and he was joined by Garrett Wang as Captain Harry Kim of the USS Rhode Island (established in the Voyager series finale "Endgame"), Jeri Ryan as Seven of Nine, Robert Picardo as the Doctor, and Ethan Phillips as Neelix. Lead Designer Al Rivera said that "several" Voyager cast members would appear in Delta Rising. The level cap was raised from 50 to 60, adding two new ranks for each faction: Admiral and Fleet Admiral for the Federation and the Romulan Republic, and General and Dahar Master for the Klingons. Several Delta Quadrant races that appeared in Voyager also were included in the new content, as well as a new tier of ships for the higher levels, and a Delta Reputation tree for players to progress through.

Delta Rising was released on October 14, 2014.

=== Expansion pack: Agents of Yesterday ===
Agents of Yesterday is Star Trek Online's third expansion, announced on May 5, 2016, as the game's contribution to the 50th anniversary of Star Trek. The expansion allows for the creation of Starfleet player characters from the era of the original series who become involved in an ongoing "Temporal Cold War" (a storyline that was introduced in Enterprise, and brought into STO with the "Future Proof" missions in Season 11) with the Na'kuhl species. Matt Winston reprised his role as Daniels, the temporal agent who fought alongside Captain Jonathan Archer to stop the Na'kuhl in several episodes of Enterprise. He was also joined by Walter Koenig, reprising his role as Pavel Chekov, and Chris Doohan as Montgomery Scott, filling in for his late father, James Doohan. The expansion also intersects with the alternate timeline from the reboot series begun in 2009 by J. J. Abrams; Joseph Gatt reprises his role as the cyborg science officer 0718, who appeared in Star Trek Into Darkness.

Agents of Yesterday was released on July 6, 2016.

=== Expansion pack: Victory is Life ===
Victory is Life is Star Trek Online's fourth expansion, announced on March 21, 2018, as the game's contribution to the 25th anniversary of Star Trek: Deep Space Nine. The expansion opens up the Gamma Quadrant, accessible by the Bajoran wormhole, and also adds the Dominion as a playable faction, with the ability to create Jem'Hadar characters only. The Cardassians can also be unlocked for the Starfleet and Klingon Defense Force factions in the in-game store. Several DS9 actors reprise their roles in the expansion, including René Auberjonois (Odo), Nana Visitor (Kira Nerys), Alexander Siddig (Dr. Julian Bashir), Armin Shimerman (Quark), Max Grodénchik (Rom), Chase Masterson (Leeta), Aron Eisenberg (Nog), Andrew Robinson (Elim Garak), J. G. Hertzler (Martok), Jeffrey Combs (Weyoun and Brunt), Salome Jens (the Female Changeling), and Bumper Robinson (Dukan'Rex, the Jem'Hadar youth who appeared in DS9's third-season episode "The Abandoned").

Victory is Life was released on June 5, 2018.

== Release and operations ==
=== Promotions ===
Cryptic Studios partnered with several retailers for distribution of pre-order copies. Each retailer had a version with unique and exclusive content, such as a Borg Bridge Officer (Amazon), a classic Constitution-class starship (GameStop), Sniper Rifle (Target), Chromodynamic armor (Steam), 500 bonus skill points (Walmart), Neodymium deflector dish (SyFy), or a Tribble/Targ pet (Best Buy). All versions of the game came with access to the Open Beta and Head Start launch date.

In addition, the code for a Wrath of Khan Admiral's uniform is included in the DVD release of The Best of Star Trek: The Next Generation Volume 2 and the Blu-ray release of Star Trek: The Original Series – Season 3.

=== Ownership ===
Star Trek Online was originally owned by Cryptic Studios and published by Atari, along with its sister title Champions Online. On May 17, 2011, Atari indicated that it no longer wanted to pursue MMORPG gaming and that it planned to sell Cryptic Studios. Later in the same month, Perfect World Entertainment purchased Cryptic Studios for $50.3 million and continued its operations.

In December 2021, Swedish holding company Embracer Group announced that it would acquire the North American and publishing arms of Perfect World Entertainment from Perfect World Europe through its Gearbox Software subsidiary. Following the acquisition, Perfect World Entertainment was renamed as Gearbox Publishing SF (San Francisco), who is now the current publisher for Star Trek Online, while Cryptic will continue operations as a subsidiary of The Gearbox Entertainment Company. As of 2024, Gearbox Publishing SF has rebranded into Arc Games following the announcement of plans for Take-Two Interactive to acquire Gearbox, while development was largely transferred to DECA Games with Cryptic acting as support.

In December 2025, it was announced that publisher Arc Games would spin off from Embracer to become an independent publisher, with Cryptic spinning off with it. It was further announced that the DECA developers who worked on Star Trek Online - and other Cryptic games - would be transferred from DECA to Cryptic as part of the spin-off.

== Reception ==
Reception

Aggregate score
Aggregator	Score
Metacritic	66/100

Review scores
Publication	Score
GameSpot	5.5/10
IGN	6.8/10

Star Trek Online has received mixed reviews, garnering a 66 on Metacritic. GameSpot praised the game's space combat as entertaining, but found the other aspects of the game to be "bland and shallow". MMOify's reviewer reviewed the game favorably but criticized many aspects of gameplay, including "poor voice acting" and repetitive quests. An IGN reviewer described the game experience as feeling like "two games" which did not mesh together well, and although visually it was "quite a gorgeous game", found much of the gameplay to be repetitive in nature.

In 2016, Den of Geek ranked Star Trek Online as one of the worst Star Trek games. In the same year, Tom's Guide ranked Star Trek Online as one of the top ten Star Trek games. In 2017, PC Gamer ranked Star Trek Online among the best Star Trek games, noting that it includes original voice acting by actors from the live-action television series. In 2020, Screen Rant ranked Star Trek Online as the best Star Trek game, saying that "This is Star Trek at its best. The nature of the franchise makes it perfectly suited to being a massively multiplayer online role-playing game".

== See also ==
- List of Star Trek games
