= List of Blizzard Entertainment games =

Video games by developer/publisher

Blizzard Entertainment is an American video game developer and publisher based in Irvine, California. The company was founded in February 1991 under the name Silicon & Synapse by Michael Morhaime, Frank Pearce and Allen Adham. The company initially concentrated on porting other studio's games to computer platforms, as well RPM Racing (1991), a remake of Racing Destruction Set (1985). In 1992, however, the company began producing original games for home consoles with The Lost Vikings (1992) and Rock n' Roll Racing (1993), and beginning with Warcraft: Orcs & Humans (1994) it shifted to primarily focus on original computer games. The company was renamed to Blizzard Entertainment in 1994, and in 1996 the company Condor, then developing Diablo (1997), was merged with Blizzard and renamed to Blizzard North; it remained a separate studio for the company until it was closed in 2005.

Blizzard was acquired by distributor Davidson & Associates in 1994, and a chain of acquisitions over the next four years led Blizzard to being a part of Vivendi Games, a subsidiary of Vivendi; when Vivendi Games merged with Activision in 2008 the resulting company was named Activision Blizzard. The name was retained when Activision Blizzard became an independent company in 2013, while Blizzard itself has been an independent subsidiary company throughout.

Since the late 1990s, Blizzard has focused almost exclusively on the Warcraft, Diablo, StarCraft, and Overwatch series. All of Blizzard's games released since 2004 still receive expansions and updates, especially the long-running massively multiplayer online role-playing game World of Warcraft (2004). With over 100 million lifetime accounts as of 2014 and US$9 billion in revenue as of 2017, World of Warcraft is one of the best-selling computer games and highest-grossing video games of all time. Blizzard Entertainment has developed 19 games since 1991, in addition to developing 8 ports between 1992 and 1993; 11 of those games are in the Warcraft, Diablo, and StarCraft series.

== Games ==
=== As Silicon & Synapse ===
List of games as Silicon & Synapse
Game	Details
RPM Racing Original release date: November 1991	Release years by system: 1991 – Super Nintendo Entertainment System
RPM Racing Original release date: November 1991	Notes: Racing game; Published by Interplay Productions; Remake of Racing Destruction Set (1985) by Electronic Arts
The Lost Vikings Original release date: May 4, 1992	Release years by system: 1992 – Sega Genesis, Super Nintendo Entertainment System; 1993 – MS-DOS; 1994 – AmigaOS, Amiga CD32; 2003 – Game Boy Advance
The Lost Vikings Original release date: May 4, 1992	Notes: Puzzle platform game; Published by Interplay Productions; Remastered version of the original game developed and published by Blizzard as part of Blizzard Arcade Collection (2021)
Rock n' Roll Racing Original release date: June 4, 1993	Release years by system: 1993 – Super Nintendo Entertainment System, Sega Genesis; 2003 – Game Boy Advance
Rock n' Roll Racing Original release date: June 4, 1993	Notes: Racing game; Published by Interplay Productions; Originally intended to be a sequel to RPM Racing; Remastered version of the original game developed and published by Blizzard as part of Blizzard Arcade Collection (2021)

=== As Blizzard Entertainment ===
List of games as Blizzard Entertainment
Game	Details
The Death and Return of Superman Original release date: August 1994	Release years by system: 1994 – Super Nintendo Entertainment System; 1995 – Sega Genesis
The Death and Return of Superman Original release date: August 1994	Notes: Beat 'em up; Published by Sunsoft
Blackthorne Original release date: September 1994	Release years by system: 1994 – Super Nintendo Entertainment System, MS-DOS; 1995 – 32X; 1996 – Mac OS, PC-98; 2003 – Game Boy Advance
Blackthorne Original release date: September 1994	Notes: Cinematic platformer; Released as Blackhawk in some European countries; Published by Interplay Productions; Remastered version of the original game developed and published by Blizzard as part of Blizzard Arcade Collection (2021)
Warcraft: Orcs & Humans Original release date: November 23, 1994	Release years by system: 1994 – MS-DOS; 1996 – Mac OS
Warcraft: Orcs & Humans Original release date: November 23, 1994	Notes: Real-time strategy game; Self-published by Blizzard; Part of the Warcraft series
Justice League Task Force Original release date: April 1995	Release years by system: 1995 – Super Nintendo Entertainment System, Sega Genesis
Justice League Task Force Original release date: April 1995	Notes: Fighting game; Developed by Blizzard and Condor and published by Sunsoft
Warcraft II: Tides of Darkness Original release date: December 9, 1995	Release years by system: 1995 – MS-DOS, Mac OS; 1997 – Sega Saturn, PlayStation; 1999 – Windows
Warcraft II: Tides of Darkness Original release date: December 9, 1995	Notes: Real-time strategy game; Self-published by Blizzard; Part of the Warcraft series; Five expansion packs released: Beyond the Dark Portal (1996) by Cyberlore Studios and Blizzard and published by Blizzard, W!Zone (1996) and W!Zone II: Retribution (1996) developed by Sunstorm Interactive and published by WizardWorks, and The Next 70 Levels (1997) and The Next 350 Levels (1997) by Maverick Software; Warcraft II: Battle Chest (1996), Warcraft II: The Dark Saga (1997), and Warcraft II: Battle.net Edition (1999) include the original game and Dark Portal; Included without expansions in the Blizzard's Game of the Year Collection (1998), and with the Dark Portal expansion in Blizzard Anthology (2000) and Warcraft III: Reign of Chaos Exclusive Gift Set (2002) collections
Diablo Original release date: January 3, 1997	Release years by system: 1997 – Windows; 1998 – Mac OS, PlayStation
Diablo Original release date: January 3, 1997	Notes: Action role-playing game; Self-published by Blizzard; Part of the Diablo series; One expansion pack, Hellfire (1997), developed by Synergistic Software and published by Sierra On-Line; Diablo + Hellfire (1998) includes the original game and Hellfire; Recreated within Diablo III (2012) in 2016 20th anniversary update; Included without expansion in the Blizzard's Game of the Year Collection (1998), Blizzard Anthology (2000), Diablo II Gift Pack (2000), and Diablo Battle Chest (2001) collections
The Lost Vikings 2 Original release date: February 27, 1997	Release years by system: 1997 – MS-DOS, Windows, PlayStation, Sega Saturn, Super Nintendo Entertainment System
The Lost Vikings 2 Original release date: February 27, 1997	Notes: Puzzle platform game; Developed by Blizzard and Beam Software and published by Blizzard; Also titled Lost Vikings 2: Norse by Norsewest or Norse by Norse West: The Return of Lost Vikings in some versions
StarCraft Original release date: March 31, 1998	Release years by system: 1998 – Windows; 1999 – Mac OS; 2000 – Nintendo 64
StarCraft Original release date: March 31, 1998	Notes: Real-time strategy game; Self-published by Blizzard; Part of the StarCraft series; Two expansion packs published by Blizzard: Insurrection (1998) by Aztech New Media and Brood War (1998) by Saffire and Blizzard; StarCraft Battle Chest (1999) includes the original game and Brood War; StarCraft: Remastered (2017) includes remastered versions of original game and Brood War; Included without expansions in the Blizzard's Game of the Year Collection (1998), and include with Brood War in the Blizzard Anthology (2000) collection
Diablo II Original release date: June 29, 2000	Release years by system: 2000 – Windows, Mac OS
Diablo II Original release date: June 29, 2000	Notes: Action role-playing game; Self-published by Blizzard; Part of the Diablo series; One expansion pack, Lord of Destruction (2001), developed and published by Blizzard; Diablo II Gold Edition (2001) includes the original game and Lord of Destruction; Included without expansion in the Diablo II Gift Pack (2000) collection, and with expansion in the Diablo Battle Chest (2001) collection; Remastered version of the original game and Lord of Destruction developed by Vicarious Visions and published by Blizzard as Diablo II: Resurrected (2021)
Warcraft III: Reign of Chaos Original release date: July 3, 2002	Release years by system: 2002 – Windows, Mac OS
Warcraft III: Reign of Chaos Original release date: July 3, 2002	Notes: Real-time strategy game; Self-published by Blizzard; Part of the Warcraft series; One expansion pack, The Frozen Throne (2003), developed and published by Blizzard; Warcraft III Battle Chest (2003) includes the original game and The Frozen Throne; Included without expansion in the Warcraft III: Reign of Chaos Exclusive Gift Set (2002) collection; Remastered version of the original game and Frozen Throne published by Blizzard as Warcraft III Reforged (2020)
World of Warcraft Original release date: November 23, 2004	Release years by system: 2004 – Windows, macOS
World of Warcraft Original release date: November 23, 2004	Notes: Massively multiplayer online role-playing game; Self-published by Blizzard; Part of the Warcraft series; Nine expansion packs developed and published by Blizzard: The Burning Crusade (2007), Wrath of the Lich King (2008), Cataclysm (2010), Mists of Pandaria (2012), Warlords of Draenor (2014), Legion (2016), Battle for Azeroth (2018), Shadowlands (2020), Dragonflight (2022), and The War Within (2024); World of Warcraft: Cataclysm Classic World of Warcraft: The War Within: Existing expansions are incorporated for free into the base game several years after release; Recreation of the original game prior to expansions released as World of Warcraft Classic (2019), and recreations of the first expansions released as The Burning Crusade Classic (2021), Wrath of the Lich King Classic (2022) and Cataclysm Classic (2024), with Mists of Pandaria Classic expected in 2025; World of Warcraft Battle Chest (2007) includes the original game and all expansions not already included in the base game
StarCraft II: Wings of Liberty Original release date: July 27, 2010	Release years by system: 2010 – Windows, macOS
StarCraft II: Wings of Liberty Original release date: July 27, 2010	Notes: Real-time strategy game; Self-published by Blizzard; Part of the StarCraft series; Two expansion packs developed and published by Blizzard: Heart of the Swarm (2013) and Legacy of the Void (2015); a three-episode set of downloadable content titled Nova Covert Ops (2016) also developed and published by Blizzard; Converted to be free-to-play in 2017; StarCraft II Battle Chest (2016) includes the original game and two expansions
Diablo III Original release date: May 15, 2012	Release years by system: 2012 – Windows, macOS; 2013 – PlayStation 3, Xbox 360; 2014 – PlayStation 4, Xbox One; 2018 – Nintendo Switch
Diablo III Original release date: May 15, 2012	Notes: Action role-playing game; Self-published by Blizzard; Part of the Diablo series; One expansion pack, Reaper of Souls (2014), developed and published by Blizzard; Diablo III: Ultimate Evil Edition (2014) includes the original game and Reaper of Souls
Hearthstone Original release date: March 11, 2014	Release years by system: 2014 – Windows, macOS, iOS, Android
Hearthstone Original release date: March 11, 2014	Notes: Digital collectible card game; Self-published by Blizzard; Part of the Warcraft series; Partially based on the World of Warcraft Trading Card Game (2006)
Heroes of the Storm Original release date: June 2, 2015	Release years by system: 2015 – Windows, macOS
Heroes of the Storm Original release date: June 2, 2015	Notes: Multiplayer online battle arena; Self-published by Blizzard
Overwatch Original release date: May 24, 2016	Release years by system: 2016 – Windows, PlayStation 4, Xbox One; 2019 – Nintendo Switch
Overwatch Original release date: May 24, 2016	Notes: First-person shooter; Self-published by Blizzard
Diablo Immortal Original release date: June 2, 2022	Release years by system: 2022 – iOS, Android, Windows
Diablo Immortal Original release date: June 2, 2022	Notes: Action role-playing game; Developed by Blizzard and NetEase and published by Blizzard; Part of the Diablo series
Diablo IV Original release date: June 6, 2023	Release years by system: 2023 – PlayStation 4, PlayStation 5, Windows, Xbox One, Xbox Series X/S
Diablo IV Original release date: June 6, 2023	Notes: Action role-playing game; Self-published by Blizzard; Part of the Diablo series; One expansion pack, Vessel of Hatred (2024), developed and published by Blizzard
Overwatch 2 Original release date: August 10, 2023	Release years by system: 2023 – Nintendo Switch, PlayStation 4, PlayStation 5, Windows, Xbox One, Xbox Series X/S; 2026 – Nintendo Switch 2
Overwatch 2 Original release date: August 10, 2023	Notes: First-person shooter; Self-published by Blizzard; Sequel to Overwatch; First released in early access on October 4, 2022
Warcraft Rumble Original release date: November 3, 2023	Release years by system: 2023 – iOS, Android; 2024 – Windows
Warcraft Rumble Original release date: November 3, 2023	Notes: Tower defense and real-time strategy game; Self-published by Blizzard; Part of the Warcraft series

=== Ports ===
Ports
Title	Original release	Port release	Platform	Ref(s).
Battle Chess	1988	1992	Windows, Commodore 64	
Battle Chess II: Chinese Chess	1991	1992	AmigaOS	
J.R.R. Tolkien's The Lord of the Rings, Vol. I	1990	1992	AmigaOS	
Castles	1991	1992	AmigaOS	
MicroLeague Baseball	1984	1992	AmigaOS	
Lexi-Cross	1991	1992	Mac OS	
Dvorak on Typing	1992	1992	Mac OS	
Shanghai II: Dragon's Eye	1993	1993	Windows	

=== Canceled ===
Canceled games
Title	Cancelled	Developer(s)	Ref(s).
Games People Play	Early 1990s	Blizzard	
Crixa	Mid 1990s	Qualia Games	
Denizen	1990s	Sunsoft	
Shattered Nations	1996	Blizzard	
Pax Imperia 2	August 1996 (Note: After Pax Imperia 2's cancellation, Heliotrope Studios assumed development of the project, releasing it as Pax Imperia: Eminent Domain in 1997)	Blizzard, Changeling Software	
Raiko	1998	Flextech	
Warcraft Adventures: Lord of the Clans	1998	Blizzard	
Nomad	1999	Blizzard	
StarCraft: Ghost	2005	Blizzard, Nihilistic Software, Swingin' Ape Studios	
Titan	2014 (Note: After Titan's cancellation, the development team repurposed many of its assets for Overwatch (2016))	Blizzard	
Odyssey	2024	Blizzard	
