= Death Knight =

Death Knight may refer to:

- Death Knight (Dungeons & Dragons), a Dungeons & Dragons monster
- Death Knight (Warcraft), a character archetype and hero class in the Warcraft video game franchise
- Deathknights, or Abyssal Exalted, in the game Exalted
- Death Knight, a character in Fire Emblem: Three Houses

== See also ==
- Death Knights of Krynn, a 1991 video game
