= Alexstrasza =

- Warcraft character
- Promotional artwork for Dragonflight depicting both forms of Alexstrasza
- First game: Warcraft II: Tides of Darkness (1995)
- Created by: Blizzard Entertainment
- Voiced by: Barbara Goodson; Wendee Lee

In-universe information
- Species: Dragon

Alexstrasza, also known as Alexstrasza the Life-Binder, is a major character in the Warcraft franchise created by Blizzard Entertainment. A female red dragon with the power to shapeshift into the form of a High Elf, she is the queen of all dragons and the leader of the organization known as the Red Dragonflight. Her power as guardian of all life was granted to her by the Titans, ancient primordial beings of godlike power. While appearing in Warcraft lore since 1995,she was first seen as a non-player character in the 2008 World of Warcraft: Wrath of the Lich King and subsequent expansions. She has since featured as a playable character in the spin-off game Heroes of the Storm.

Alexstrasza has been praised by critics and fans as a prominent and powerful heroine, and she remains an ambassador character for World of Warcraft. However, her sexualized appearance when in humanoid form has caused controversy and was changed over time. Part of her backstory in which she was enslaved by villainous orcs and forced to breed mounts for them also drew controversy, with a time-travel quest involving it being rewritten after encountering backlash from fans.

== Appearance ==
Alexstrasza first appeared in the 1995 Warcraft II, where she was represented as a building exclusive to the orc campaign, the Dragon Roost. Her dragon form, with a team-dependent color scheme, is depicted in adamantine chains, and is used to generate new dragon units. She did not appear as an NPC until World of Warcraft: Wrath of the Lich King, where she was given a redesign.

In her new design, Alexstrasza takes the appearance of a massive and powerful red dragon with golden bracelets, four horns, and horn ornaments. She is able to become a High Elf to better blend in with other humanoid races, though she retains her horns. While she can transform into any race, she chose the High Elves because they revered her the most throughout history.

== Background ==
For thousands of years, Alexstrasza was a member of the benevolent Dragon Aspects, who were given their power by the ancient primordial titans in order to ensure order in Azeroth. About twenty years prior to the events of Lich King, the villainous Deathwing, once a fellow Dragon Aspect named Neltharion, manipulated the Dragonmaw Clan, a group of orcs, to use a magical artifact known as the Dragon Soul to capture and enslave Alextrasza in the mountain fortress of Grim Batol. She and her mate Tyranastrasz were forced to breed drakes for the Dragonmaw riders before she was freed by a band of adventurers and the other four uncorrupted aspects. Meanwhile, Tyranastrasz perished before he could be rescued.

After being saved, she agreed to honor her debt by helping the people who rescued her fight back against Malygos, the crazed Aspect of the blue dragonflight.

== Development ==
When interpreting the character as a Heroes of the Storm fighter, Blizzard developers were forced to lower her power from its canonical levels, saying that making her an accurate size and power "broke the game". In order to ensure game balance, they reduced the size and destructive abilities of her dragon form.

== Reception ==
Alexstrasza was noted as one of the most prominent of the game's female characters but also an exception in a male-dominated fictional history. Digital Culture, Play, and Identity compared Alextrasza's and the roles of other major women in the game as replications of Eve meeting Lucifer to introduce evil into the world, specifically mentioning her agreement to act as a puppet for evil forces in order to save her children. Her initial in-game outfit was described by Kotaku as "bikini armor" created to draw male players, and a 2010 video of an all-male panel of Blizzard developers that mocked a female fan who asked about more varied female character designs later resurfaced and went viral during sexual harassment allegations towards the company. This question was stated to have been initially inspired by the armor design of Alexstrasza, who had recently been introduced.

Alexstrasza's appearance as a playable Heroes of the Storm character was generally praised, but received complaints regarding its lack of accuracy in comparison to her World of Warcraft incarnation. Maddy Myers of Kotaku stated that Alexstrasza's ability to transform from a humanoid healer into a dragon felt "great", "exciting and challenging", and that it "feels incredible to unleash those dragon powers and turn around a team fight". However, she also noted that Alextrasza's powers felt lessened compared to World of Warcraft, and her willingness to battle conflicted with her compassionate devotion to healing.

As part of the Fractures of Time update to World of Warcraft, one particular quest added to the Public Test Realm (PTR), a beta testing server, had the player going back in time to prevent the Dragonmaw Clan from misplacing the Dragon Soul in order to maintain the timeline. The fact that this ultimately led to Alextrasza being imprisoned, tortured and exploited caused an uproar amongst fans and led to the quest's removal. It was replaced with a rewritten quest in which players helped free her from Grim Batol instead, and its dialog was made more empathetic. Cass Marshall of Polygon praised Dragonflight as being the first expansion to make her "more of an actual character" as opposed to a "boring" goddess-like figure. She noted the fact that Alexstrasza was given additional character flaws, such as acting cowardly and prioritizing "her powers and the peace of Azeroth above even her closest relationships".

An Easter egg acknowledging Alextrasza's reputation as an enticing character, or "thirst trap", amongst fans was added to Dragonflight, in which Alextrasza asks the player if she has "big mom energy". While this can technically be taken literally, it also references the idea of a sexually attractive mother.
