= Chromie =

Fictional character from Warcraft

- Warcraft character
- Promotional artwork of Chromie showing her preferred form as a gnome with a silhouette of her dragon form in the background
- First appearance: World of Warcraft (2004)
- Created by: Blizzard Entertainment

In-universe information
- Full name: Chronormu
- Alias: Keeper of Time
- Species: Bronze dragon
- Gender: Female

Chromie, also known by the dragon name Chronormu, is a fictional character in the Warcraft media franchise. She is a bronze dragon who usually appears in the form of a female gnome, and is associated with time travel, the Bronze Dragonflight, and the protection of Azeroth's timelines.

First appearing in World of Warcraft, Chromie became a recurring non-player character in time-travel storylines, later appearing as a playable character in Heroes of the Storm and as a central figure in Hearthstone's time-travel-themed expansion Across the Timeways.

In 2021, the short story "Visage Day", published in World of Warcraft: Folk & Fairy Tales of Azeroth, revealed Chromie's gender identity through her choice of visage and pronouns. World of Warcraft narrative lead Steve Danuser later clarified that the pronoun usage in the story was deliberate, and that Chromie uses she/her pronouns in both her dragon and mortal forms. The reveal attracted coverage from gaming and LGBTQ-focused media, making Chromie one of the most prominent LGBTQ characters in the Warcraft franchise.

== Concept and development ==
Yahoo Esports covered Chromie's addition to Heroes of the Storm through a "Beyond the basics" video segment in which Dylan Walker discussed the character with a lead hero designer, framing the video as a closer look at Chromie's mechanics beyond her basic moves. In accompanying coverage of the same Heroes of the Storm update, Yahoo Esports described Chromie as a long-range character built around abilities such as Sand Blast and Dragon's Breath, and noted that she could unlock talents one level earlier than other playable heroes.

Blizzard later adjusted Chromie's design several times. In 2017, the developers changed Sand Blast into a baseline quest, explaining that the change was intended to create greater variance between average and skilled Chromie players by rewarding precision. In 2018, Blizzard said further changes were intended to reduce frustration when playing against Chromie, increase counterplay, reduce her range and burst damage, and encourage Chromie players to interact more directly with opponents rather than relying only on long-range attacks.

== Appearances ==
=== World of Warcraft ===
Chromie first appears in the original version of World of Warcraft as Chronormu, a bronze dragon who takes the form of a female gnome. Within the game's story, she serves a quest-giving non-player character connected to the Bronze Dragonflight and the manipulation of time.

World of Warcraft: Legion introduces a quest called The Deaths of Chromie through Patch 7.2.5 in 2017. Completion of this quest would require players to save Chromie from multiple assassination attempts.

By 2020, Chromie's role became more visible after Blizzard introduced Timewalking Campaigns, commonly referred to by players as "Chromie Time", a leveling feature that allows eligible players to choose earlier World of Warcraft expansions as their leveling path by speaking with Chromie in Stormwind or Orgrimmar. As a result of this leveling revamp, she became more heavily incorporated into the game's mechanics as players are able to access older expansions through her.

Chromie play a major role in World of Warcraft: Dragonflight, including the Fractures in Time update and the Dawn of the Infinite mega-dungeon storyline. Blizzard described the dungeon as a timeway-focused scenario in which players work with Chromie and Nozdormu to confront threats to Azeroth's future.

Morchie, a villainous variant of Chromie from an alternate timeline in which the evil Murozond rose and the Infinite Dragonflight prevailed, appears in the Dawn of the Infinite mega-dungeon for Dragonflight.

=== Heroes of the Storm ===
Chromie was added to Blizzard's multiplayer online battle arena game Heroes of the Storm as a playable ranged assassin. She has been described as a "fragile, yet devastating artillery assassin", noting that her abilities were built around long-range attacks, delayed skillshots, stasis effects, and time-manipulation mechanics. Her ability set included Sand Blast, Dragon's Breath, Time Trap, Slowing Sands, and Temporal Loop, all themed around ranged magical damage and control over time.

=== Hearthstone ===
Chromie also appeared in Hearthstone. In the 2025 expansion Across the Timeways, Blizzard placed Chromie at the center of the expansion's story, describing her as a Bronze Dragonflight chronomancer who recruits Warcraft heroes from past, future, and alternate timelines to oppose Murozond, Lord of the Infinite.

=== In other media ===
The character's backstory was expanded in "Visage Day", a 2021 short story by Steve Danuser that was first published as part of World of Warcraft: Folk & Fairy Tales of Azeroth and later made available by Blizzard on the official World of Warcraft website. The story follows Chromie as she seeks advice from other dragons before choosing her mortal visage, the form dragons adopt when coming of age. After excerpts circulated online, Danuser clarified that the story's use of pronouns was intentional: before the Visage Day ceremony, Chronormu was referred to with he/him pronouns, and afterward Chromie used she/her pronouns in both mortal and dragon forms.

== Reception ==
Chromie's transgender identity attracted attention from gaming media. Before Blizzard officially confirmed Chromie's transgender identity, fans and commentators had noted that the dragon name Chronormu appeared unusual because the "-ormu" suffix had traditionally been associated with male bronze dragons, while Chromie appeared as female in her gnome form. A 2017 essay published by The Mary Sue argued that the Chromie, a long-running World of Warcraft character, was a strong candidate for explicit transgender representation because her existing lore already supported that interpretation and because some transgender players identified strongly with her. The article argued that making Chromie's identity canon would help bring a transgender character into a mainstream video game setting.

Following the official reveal, GameSpot noted that she was not the franchise's first transgender character but was "certainly the most prominent". PCGamesN similarly emphasized her status as one of World of Warcraft's older NPCs, noting that she had appeared across major expansions and had been present in the game since its early period. Wowhead also covered the reveal, noting long-running fan speculation around the character because Chromie's full dragon name, Chronormu, used a suffix traditionally associated with male bronze dragons while the character appeared as a female gnome. Game Rant similarly reported that the confirmation followed years of speculation among LGBT fans about Chromie's identity.

Chromie's incarnation in Heroes of the Storm has been discussed in depth by gaming media. PC Gamer published a guide to Chromie that described her as a time-manipulating ranged assassin focused on skillshots, low health, long cast times, and early talent unlocks through her Timewalker passive. Chris Pereira of GameSpot highlighted her long-range artillery design and time-based mechanics, including delayed attacks and the ability to return an enemy to a previous location. Chris Carter of Destructoid praised her as a true "glass cannon", writing that although she was highly vulnerable to assassins and lacked easy escape options, her long-range damage and tactical tools made her useful in many situations.

In 2023, Polygon's Cass Marshall described Chromie as a fan-favorite Bronze dragon with time-travel powers while covering criticism of a Dragonflight public test realm quest involving Alexstrasza's backstory. The article noted that players objected to the quest's handling of traumatic material and that Blizzard later removed and revised the quest after feedback.
