= Heroes of the Storm =

2015 video game

- Developer: Blizzard Entertainment
- Publisher: Blizzard Entertainment
- Directors: Dustin Browder; Alan Dabiri
- Producer: Kaéo Milker
- Composers: Glenn Stafford; Jason Hayes
- Platforms: macOS; Windows
- Release: June 2, 2015
- Genre: MOBA
- Mode: Multiplayer

Heroes of the Storm is a multiplayer online battle arena video game developed and published by Blizzard Entertainment. Announced at BlizzCon 2010, it was released on June 2, 2015, for macOS and Windows. The game features various crossover characters from Blizzard's franchises as playable heroes, as well as different battlegrounds based on Warcraft, Diablo, StarCraft, and Overwatch universes.

Matches are contested between two teams of five players, each aiming to destroy the opposing team's main structure, known as the "Core." The first team to do so wins the match, with a typical duration of around 20 minutes. Matches take place on various themed battlegrounds, each featuring unique level designs and secondary objectives, the completion of which grants significant advantages. Every player controls a single character, known as a "hero", with a set of distinctive abilities and differing styles of play. Heroes become more powerful over the course of a match by collecting experience points and unlocking "talents" that offer new abilities or augment existing ones, contributing to the team's overall strategy.

Heroes of the Storm is inspired by Defense of the Ancients, a community-created mod for Warcraft III, another video game developed by Blizzard Entertainment. Heroes of the Storm is free-to-play and is supported by microtransactions which can be used to purchase heroes, visual alterations for the heroes in the game, mounts, and other cosmetic elements. Blizzard originally referred to the game as a "hero brawler", but later started using the more common term for the genre – "multiplayer online battle arena" (MOBA).

As of July 2022, Blizzard scaled back major development of Heroes of the Storm, but the game continues to receive regular updates, including seasonal balance changes and bug fixes. At the 2026 Blizzcon, Blizzard announced they were reviving Heroes starting with its first new hero in several years.

== Gameplay ==
Captured temple fires laser beam on red team's forts on Sky Temple map.

Heroes of the Storm revolves around 5-versus-5 battles, hosted on Blizzard's online gaming service, Battle.net, with an average match duration of approximately 20 minutes. In each match, players work together as a team to achieve the ultimate victory condition: destroying the opposing team's main structure, known as the "Core", before enemy team does the same. To reach the Core, players must first break through at least one lane of defensive structures, which include "forts" and "keeps." To aid in this effort, teams can secure the assistance of mercenary camps, powerful battleground bosses, and waves of computer-controlled units called "minions." Minions periodically spawn in groups and march along designated lanes toward the enemy base, engaging any opposition along the way.

There are currently 15 battlegrounds, each with its own distinct metagame and secondary objectives Completing these objectives grants substantial advantages, often by requiring teams to contest key locations or engage in direct confrontations, ultimately increasing their ability to push through enemy defenses more effectively.

In all game modes, each player controls one of the 89 playable characters (as of March 2025), called "heroes", with each having a unique design, strengths, and weaknesses. Heroes are divided into six separate roles: tank, bruiser, ranged assassin, melee assassin, healer, and support. Players can purchase permanent access to heroes using the in-game currency, called "Gold," or through microtransactions. Additionally, there is always a free hero rotation available each week, allowing players to try out different heroes without cost.

Each individual hero comes with a set of distinctive abilities. Ability kit is generally composed of three basic abilities usable right from level 1, a passive or active trait, and a powerful "heroic ability". Upon reaching level 10, players can choose between two "heroics" which often have a devastating effect and a long cooldown. Heroics are usually the strongest tools in an arsenal that define a hero's strengths and playstyle. A hero can only gain one type of heroic per match. If a hero runs out of health points and dies, they are removed from active play until a respawn timer counts down to zero, after which they subsequently respawn at the rear of their team's base, known as the "Hall of Storms". Furthermore, the Hall of Storms allows heroes to quickly restore their health and mana over time as long as they are within the Hall. The Hall also offers protection from enemy damage and effects, and enemy players are repelled outward a slight distance in a sudden fashion upon entering an opposing team's Hall.

Experience points, which players can gain by gathering experience globes from fallen minions, are shared across the entire team. This is uncommon for the MOBA genre, in which most games employ a system of separate, per-player experience and leveling. In addition, certain enemy structures, such as towers, forts and keeps, will provide experience to the team who destroys them, as well as captured mercenary camps. When a team during the course of the match reaches a certain experience point threshold, every hero on that team levels up, acquiring slightly amplified powers, up to a maximum level of 30. Every few levels, players may select a "talent" which offers a new ability or augments an existing one. Two significant power spikes are at level 10 and level 20, where heroes gain access to some of the most powerful talents in the game, referred to as "heroic" and "storm talents", respectively. This leveling system emphasizes the importance of teamwork and planning since a player's action can affect the whole team.

In addition to the talent system, each player is able to use a "Hearthstone", an ability that allows heroes to teleport back to their base from anywhere on the battleground after a few seconds of channeling without receiving damage, using abilities, or attacking. Players can also utilize various mounts, such as animals, bikes, and clouds, to increase their movement speed, automatically dismounting when attacking, receiving damage or using most abilities.

=== Game modes ===
Heroes of the Storm offers various game modes, allowing players to choose between battling computer-controlled heroes or competing in team-based matches against other players.

- Tutorials - The tutorials are composed of three scripted 'levels' that are aimed at new players with the intent of teaching movement, use of abilities and other basic controls. The player controls Jim Raynor, who is teleported from the StarCraft universe into the Nexus, receiving instructions from Uther the Lightbringer from the Warcraft series.
- Training - A reduced experience mode where a player teams up with four AI teammates against five AI opponents set at the Beginner difficulty.
- Versus A.I. - Players face off against five AI opponents. Before starting the match, the player can choose to have human-controlled or AI allies. The difficulty setting of the AI can also be chosen prior to initiating a match.
- Quick Match - In this mode, players select their heroes before entering the match, without knowing the battleground or the heroes they will be matched with or against. Two teams of five human-controlled heroes are pitted against each other in player-versus-player (PvP) combat on a random battleground. Players are free to queue solo or in a party, and the teams are formed based on the players' past performance and the roles of the chosen heroes to ensure a balanced match. For instance, if a player queues solo as a Support, they are unlikely to be matched with four other Support heroes, promoting a more diverse team composition. Unlike the Draft mode, where selecting a hero in coordination with teammates and considering the enemy composition is crucial, Quick Match allows players to play their preferred heroes.
- Unranked Draft - Before the start of an Unranked Draft game, opposing teams engage in a "draft" phase, where they alternate selecting Heroes to form their respective compositions of five characters. As the draft progresses, both teams can observe the others' selections, along with the battleground on which the match will take place. This adds a layer of strategy, as players must carefully choose their Heroes based on the compositions of both teams, as well as their knowledge of how the different battlegrounds affect gameplay. During the draft, each team can ban up to three Heroes, preventing either team from selecting these characters for the remainder of the draft. Unranked Draft is often considered a mode that introduces players to a system similar to the ranked Storm League, but without the pressure of impacting their MMR (Matchmaking Rating). It offers a more structured and strategic experience compared to Quick Match, allowing players to practice their hero selection and team composition skills without risking changes to their ranking.
- Storm League - Storm League utilizes a draft phase before gameplay, similar to the draft system in Unranked Draft. Players are matched with and against each other based on their rankings, which are determined by their past Storm League performance. Players are ranked in leagues from Bronze (lowest) to Grand Master (highest) based on their in-game performance. Leagues below Master (the second-highest league) are divided into five divisions, numbered 1–5, with Division 1 being the highest and Division 5 the lowest. Each league—Bronze, Silver, Gold, Platinum, and Diamond—contains these five divisions. In Master league, divisions are not used; instead, players are ranked directly by their MMR points. The top 100 players in Master, who have won at least 35 games during the current season, are considered Grand Masters. An online leaderboard, maintained by Blizzard, is updated nightly to display the current list of Grand Master players in each major region. Players can choose to compete either individually or as part of a team of up to five players in Storm League matches, where they will be matched with others in their selected region. To participate in Storm League, players must have access to 16 heroes at hero-level 5 or higher, (Note: Excluding Cho'gall, a unique combination-focused Hero that is controlled by 2 players simultaneously) as well as an account-level of 50 or higher. Heroes that are unlocked during the weekly free rotation (which are available to all players without needing to be specifically unlocked) count toward the required 16 heroes. As players compete, they earn rank points, which affect their rank and are used to match them with other players of similar rankings. Player rank is expressed in League Tiers and Divisions, and each player is assigned a rank individually. Rank is determined by the player's MMR and adjusted for penalties, such as the Leaver Penalty. The first official Ranked Play season began on June 14, 2016, and ended on September 13. Each Ranked Play season is set to last for approximately 3–4 months.
- Heroes Brawl - Added on October 18, 2016, this game mode had four different subcategories with varying rules. By completing 3 games of Heroes Brawl each week, players earn a reward of one loot box. The rules of Heroes Brawl change every two weeks, including the following variations:.
  - Arenas - Players pick one of three (mostly) randomly selected Heroes and try to complete the objective. The first team to complete the objective will claim victory. The first to win two rounds wins the match. There are multiple arena maps exclusively designed for this mode. The Hero options given to the players are not entirely random, as certain characters are banned from the game mode, and certain precautions have been made to ensure team balance. For example, if one team is offered the choice of a healer-role Hero, the other team will be offered a healer as well.
  - Mutators - Mutators introduce unique mechanics that alter gameplay on existing Battlegrounds. These modifications change how abilities, talents, or other game mechanics function. Hero selection is limited to fit the theme of the Brawl, and special rules or added effects can significantly impact strategy and match dynamics, requiring players to adapt to new conditions that differ from standard matches.
  - Single-Lanes - Focus on the destruction of the enemy's structures, with additional mechanics that differentiate them from the regular ARAM mode. These battlegrounds feature a single lane and often include unique objectives or special effects that create a more chaotic and dynamic experience. For example, in the "Mineral Madness" battleground, players gather "minerals" that grant an aura to the Hero who collects them, providing various effects such as damaging nearby enemies or disabling structures, once a certain amount is gathered.
  - Special - This mode offers a unique twist by stepping away from traditional Battlegrounds and replicating classic mini-games with Heroes taking center stage. Instead of the usual gameplay, players participate in creative and fun challenges, such as "Dodge Ball" with hero Chromie, where players throw sand blasts to hit opponents, "Rocket Racing," where players race using rocket mounts, or "Pull Party," where all players control hero Stitches and use his hook ability to pull enemies toward them, dragging them across a pool. Additionally, there's "Escape from Braxis," a PvE map that offers a different type of challenge, focusing on cooperation and survival. These special modes add variety and fun, offering a break from the regular mechanics of standard matches.
- ARAM - Added on September 8, 2020, ARAM (All Random, All Mid) features one-lane Battlegrounds with no objectives other than the destruction of the enemy's structures. Heroes are selected using the same "choose from three" method as in the Arenas subcategory of Heroes Brawl. The use of the "Hearthstone" to teleport to the Hall of Storms is disabled, and the Hall of Storms provides no healing or mana restoration, although it still grants immunity to damage and disabling effects to players within its area. Due to the altered geography of a single-lane Battleground significantly impacting strategy and game balance, certain Heroes are restricted from the pool of available choices at the start of the game.
- Custom Games - Custom Games are primarily used for tournament play or casual practice. Players can create a lobby and set up a predetermined match between two teams, each consisting of up to five players. The creator of the lobby has full control over the settings, including the ability to select the battleground, enable draft mode, and add AI-controlled Heroes if desired. Additionally, the host can allow up to six observers to watch the match. This mode provides players with flexibility in creating customized experiences for practice or competitive play.

=== Matchmaking ===
Matchmaking is based on the Elo rating system with proprietary adjustments. MMR (matchmaking rating) is calculated individually for each player, and it is tracked separately for every game mode. In ranked mode matchmaker tries to place players with similar ratings together, while generally attempts to balance both teams based on each player's MMR to find and create even games.

== Business model ==
Heroes of the Storm is free-to-play, based on the freemium business model, and is supported by micropayments using three in-game currencies: "Gems", "Gold", and "Shards". Gold is in-game currency that can be earned by playing the game, completing daily, seasonal and event quests, and leveling up (Loot Chests can be acquired in the same way). Gold can be used to buy heroes, gold-only mounts, hero mastery rings, Loot Chests and Shards. Gems can be earned in-game or purchased with real money, and Shards are acquired from duplicate items from Loot Chests or purchased with Gold. Players can use either Gems or Shards to buy skins, mounts and other cosmetic elements, such as banners, sprays, announcers, voice lines, emojis, and portraits. Heroes, as the only category in Collection with a material effect on gameplay, may be purchased by either Gems or Gold.

Gem-only items in Collection are "bundles" (dynamic groups of Heroes of the Storm content), and "boosts" (formerly called "stimpacks") which increase Gold and account experience earned per match.

== Development ==
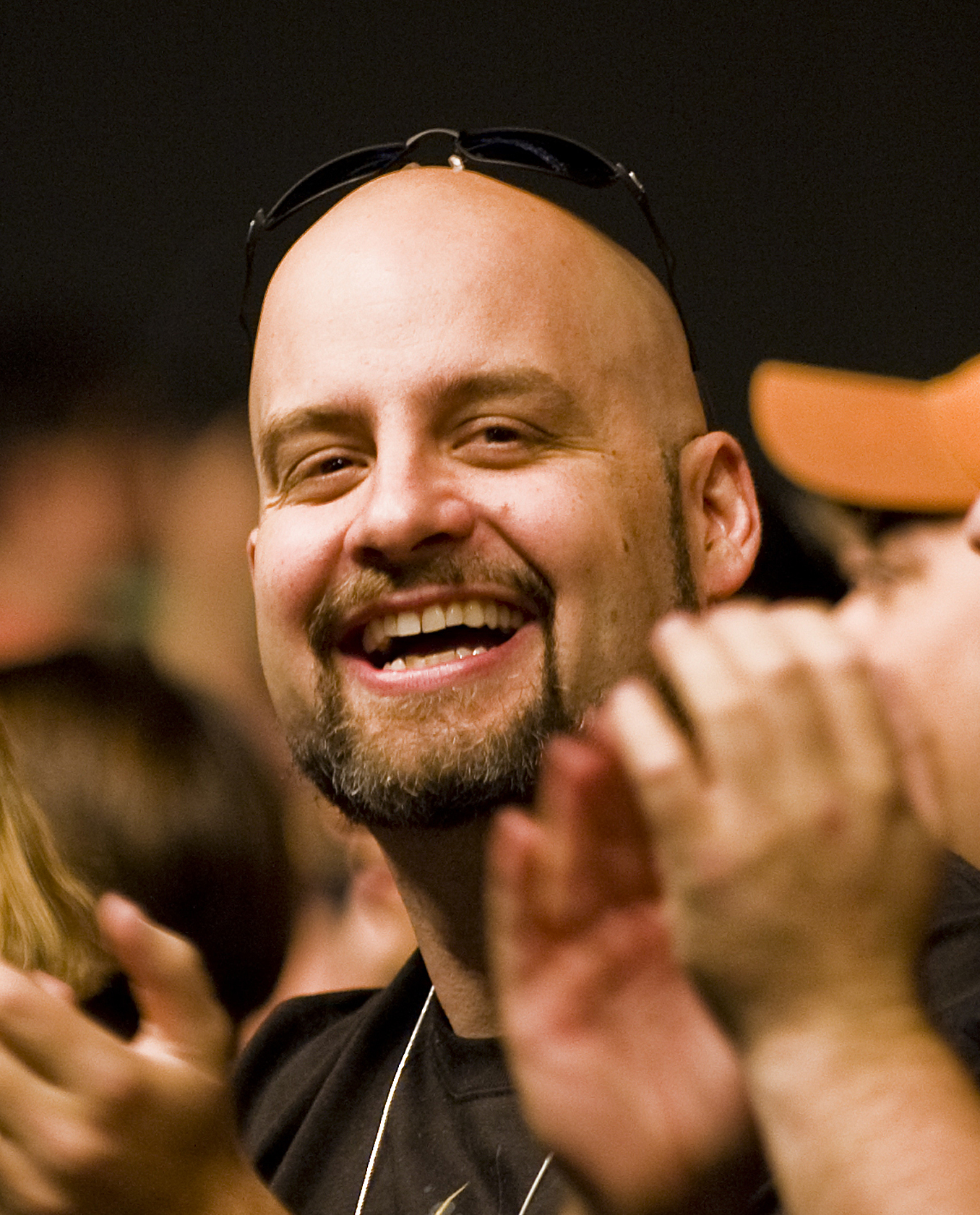
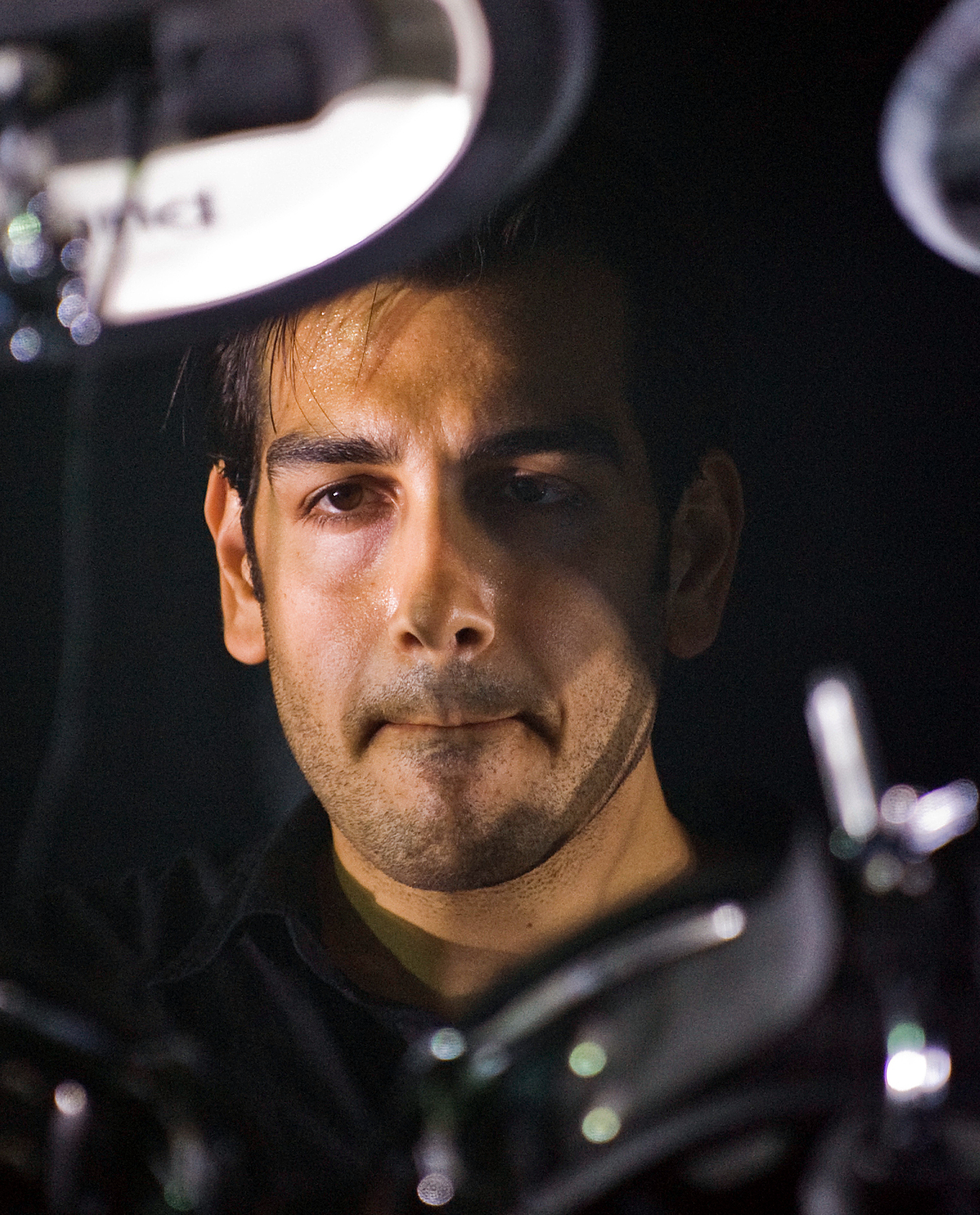
Directors Dustin Browder (left) and Alan Dabiri (right)

As a part of the arcade feature for StarCraft II: Wings of Liberty, a custom map called "Blizzard DOTA" was announced alongside several other mods for StarCraft II at BlizzCon 2010. At that time, the map was developed to showcase the modding abilities that were to be added to StarCraft II. In 2011, however, development of Blizzard DOTA was rebooted and demoed at BlizzCon 2011. In comparison to the previous iteration previewed at BlizzCon 2010, the gameplay was described as "fast" and "streamlined."

Following the announcement of Dota 2 by Valve, Rob Pardo, the executive vice president of Blizzard Entertainment, expressed concern at Valve using and trademarking a name that originated from within the Warcraft III community. Following a failed trademark injunction on the part of Riot Games, Blizzard acquired Riot's subsidiary, DotA-Allstars, LLC., the original company that represented the servicing of Defense of the Ancients. Subsequently, Blizzard filed an opposition against Valve for claiming the DotA trademark. On May 11, 2012, Blizzard and Valve announced that the dispute had been settled, with Valve retaining the commercial franchising rights to the term "Dota", while Blizzard would change the name of Blizzard DOTA to Blizzard All-Stars. Blizzard, however, will retain the right to use DOTA name non-commercially. This includes promoting DOTA-style maps made for Blizzard games by the community.

In June 2012, Dustin Browder, the director of StarCraft II, stated that Blizzard All-Stars did not have a release date, but that it would definitely be after the release of StarCraft II: Heart of the Swarm. In February 2013, the Activision Blizzard fourth quarter 2012 earnings report listed Blizzard All-Stars as one of the areas of continued investment for Blizzard throughout 2013. Browder commented in March 2013 that a few artists had transitioned from the StarCraft II: Heart of the Swarm team, to work on Blizzard All-Stars for the time being along with the few designers on the team. One challenge faced by art team, according to the senior art director Samwise Didier, was bringing in three different art styles and themes from Warcraft, StarCraft, and Diablo in line to make the art style for the game.

In August 2013 the game went into wider internal testing. Blizzard president Mike Morhaime described it as Blizzard's version of an "action real-time strategy" game. The Blizzard All-Stars team was expanded in May 2013, from some of the resources who were reallocated when Blizzard's Titan project was rebooted and the team downsized. On October 17, 2013, the name of the game was changed to Heroes of the Storm.

Heroes of the Storm entered a technical alpha testing phase on March 13, 2014, which went offline on September 22, 2014. The technical alpha went back online on October 7, 2014, for North America, Latin America, South East Asia, Australia, and New Zealand. The servers for Europe, Korea, China, and Taiwan went online in the following weeks. The technical alpha continued until the beginning of the closed beta. Closed beta testing started on January 13, 2015. As of February 2015, over 9 million players had signed up for eligibility to receive an invite to beta testing. The open beta of the game began on May 19, 2015, and the full version of the game was released on June 2, 2015.

=== Post-release ===
==== Promotions ====
While the game was in Alpha testing, Blizzard ran a promotion as part of the pre-order for Diablo III: Reaper of Souls which unlocked Valla as a free hero. To mark the release of Heroes of the Storm, Blizzard had crossovers implemented between Blizzard games. Players who reached account level 12 in Heroes of the Storm received the Heroes of the Storm themed card back in Hearthstone and after winning 100 play mode matches in Hearthstone received the Hearthstone Card mount in Heroes of the Storm. Players who reached account level 20 in Heroes of the Storm received a Grave Golem battle pet in World of Warcraft and after reaching level 100 in World of Warcraft received an Ironside Dire Wolf mount in Heroes of the Storm. After the Diablo hero patch, any player who purchased Diablo III was given the Diablo hero (Al'Diabolos) free for a limited time; players who reach level 12 in Heroes of the Storm will receive a unique pennant and portrait frame in Diablo III and reaching level 70 Season 4 and beyond receive Malthael's Phantom mount in Heroes of the Storm. Players who purchase the StarCraft II: Legacy of the Void deluxe or collector's editions receive a Void Seeker mount in Heroes of the Storm and purchasing any edition of Legacy of the Void unlocks the Artanis hero. Players who purchase the Origins Edition of Overwatch unlock Tracer as a free hero.

During the Nexus Challenge event (November 15, 2016 – January 4, 2017), each player who completed 15 games of Heroes of the Storm together with a friend received the Oni Genji skin, Oni Genji Portrait and Oni Genji Spray in Overwatch, and Zarya as a free hero in Heroes of the Storm. After completing 30 games with a friend, players unlocked four additional heroes (Auriel, Greymane, Kerrigan, and Li-Ming), the Orochi Hovercycle mount, and a 30-Day stimpack in Heroes of the Storm.

During the For Azeroth! event (February 14, 2017 – March 14, 2017, then extended for March 17, 2017 – March 26, 2017), each player who completed 15 games of Heroes of the Storm together with a friend while playing as a Warcraft character, received a Flames of Judgement Charger mount and a 10-day stimpack to use in-game. They also received a Primal Flamesaber mount for World of Warcraft.

During the Nexus Challenge 2.0 event (April 24, 2017 – May 22, 2017), all players could choose to permanently unlock 1 of 4 Mega Bundles; Assassin, Flex, Support & Specialist, and Tanks & Bruisers. For each of the 4 weeks of the event, players who completed 5 matches with a friend could unlock various Overwatch-themed rewards for the players' Heroes of the Storm and Overwatch accounts.

==== Heroes of the Storm 2.0 ====
On March 29, 2017, game director Alan Dabiri announced Heroes of the Storm 2.0, described as "a culmination of all the ways Blizzard transformed the Nexus since launch, plus plenty of radical additions on their way". A major feature of the patch was a revamp of the player and hero progression systems. The level caps (40 for players in general, and 20 for individual heroes) were removed, and the uneven experience curve for leveling heroes was smoothed out. Another feature was the introduction of Loot Chests which contain cosmetic rewards, similar to the system used in Overwatch. In addition to heroes, skins, and mounts, the chests can also include new portraits, banners, emojis, custom announcer voices (similar to StarCraft II), hero voice lines, and graffiti sprays (both similar to Overwatch). Loot Chests can be acquired by leveling up or purchased with Gold. The in-game shop was remodeled and retitled "Collection", and two new currencies, "Gems" and "Shards", were added in addition to the existing "Gold" which was the only in-game currency before Heroes 2.0 update. A loadout system for cosmetic additions was also included. As part of the announcement, a new Diablo hero, the Amazon Cassia, was highlighted.

Heroes 2.0 went into beta testing on March 29, 2017, and was released on April 25 of the same year.

==== Downsizing ====
On December 13, 2018, Blizzard President J. Allen Brack and Blizzard Chief Development Officer Ray Gresko jointly announced that some developers from Heroes of the Storm would be moving to other projects, and that the game would be transitioning to a long-term support phase. Blizzard also announced the cancellation of their esports tournaments, Heroes Global Championship and Heroes of the Dorm. Members of the esports community around Heroes stated they were caught off guard by the announcement and had been told as recently as BlizzCon 2018 that HGC would continue. In a message posted on the game's official forums, production director Kaéo Milker confirmed the game would continue receiving updates and new content, though at a slower pace than before.

Blizzard officially stated in July 2022 that they ended major development of Heroes of the Storm. However, following Microsoft's acquisition of Blizzard, the game has continued to receive a range of updates, including adjustments to hero abilities, quality of life improvements, and other changes, alongside seasonal balance updates and bug fixes.

==== Nexus Anomalies ====
Nexus Anomalies were seasonal gameplay changes that directly affected all game modes in Heroes of the Storm. These events lasted for entire ranked seasons, allowing the developers time to receive feedback on them. Depending on this evaluation, some of the new game mechanics became permanent additions to the game, while others were discarded after some time. Experience Globes were the first Nexus Anomaly, being introduced in the Deathwing patch of December 2019. As a result of this Nexus Anomaly, players no longer receive experience from simply being near enemy minion deaths, but instead need to gather an Experience Globe dropped by dying Minions, similar to the Regeneration Globes already present in the game. Before the introduction of the Nexus Anomalies, major gameplay updates were typically announced once a year, toward the end of the year. The introduction of any new Nexus Anomalies was ended on December 1, 2020, with Blizzard promising to continue attempting to improve the game in other ways.

=== 2026 revival ===
Blizzard announced at the September 2026 Blizzcon that they were reviving development of Heroes of the Storm, introducing its first new hero, Xal’atath, from World of Warcraft: Midnight.

== Setting and plot ==
Heroes of the Storm takes place in the Nexus, a strange limbo of clashing universes which collide from across space, time, and dimensions. The Nexus exists in the center of a trans-dimensional cosmic storm and is connected to other universes. The storm of the Nexus, which has incomprehensible amounts of energy, can rip worlds and universes in and out of existence, and it can also pull worlds into stability. Some of the central realms in the Nexus, such as Raven Court, King's Crest, and Luxoria, are examples of these points of stability. Every Realm within the Nexus has one stone called "Singularity", and only the one who achieves it through conquest can become the Realm Lord. A singularity stone grants to its possessor an almost demigod-like status, but not immortality. Many powerful warriors have been sucked into the Nexus, including combatants from Azeroth, Sanctuary, and the Koprulu sector. New combatants are constantly arriving, some of them are chosen after they died in their original reality. A hero called Qhira, came into the Nexus after her world Iresia and its singularity stone were destroyed, holding only a singularity shard from Iresia, and calling it the "mother crystal".

Numerous worlds exist within the multiverse of the Nexus which are referred to as "realms". While many of these worlds are nexus-generated, some are mirrored versions of those found within Blizzard's franchises, but they can contain alternate universe versions of various heroes, indicated by hero skins in the game.

== Music ==
Heroes of the Storm's playlist combines an original soundtrack with soundtracks from Blizzard's other franchises. The original soundtrack for Heroes of the Storm was composed by Blizzard Entertainment's composers, Glenn Stafford, and Jason Hayes. Other music in the game is present as background music, or represents specific universes with connections to the various Heroes within Heroes of the Storm. Also present within the game's playlist are soundtracks from Starcraft, such as Terran and Zerg Theme; various soundtracks from World of Warcraft, such as Obsidian Sanctum from Wrath of the Lich King, and The Wandering Isle from Mists of Pandaria; soundtracks from Diablo, such as Jungle from Diablo II (Act III), and Reaper of Souls from Diablo III; as well as soundtracks from Overwatch, such as Overture and Hanamura theme; and Smugglers Cove from The Lost Vikings 2.

The Battle Begins by Glenn Stafford is the main theme of Heroes of the Storm.

== Reception ==
Reception

Aggregate score
| Aggregator | Score |
|---|---|
| Metacritic | 86/100 |

Review scores
| Publication | Score |
|---|---|
| Destructoid | 9.5/10 |
| GameRevolution | 4.5/5 |
| GameSpot | 9/10 |
| GamesRadar+ | 4.5/5 |
| IGN | 8/10 |
| PC Gamer (US) | 84/100 |
| Polygon | 7.5/10 |
| The Escapist | 4/5 |

Heroes of the Storm received generally favorable reviews upon release. Metacritic calculated an average score of 86 out of 100, indicating "generally favorable reviews", based on 57 reviews.

GameSpot awarded it 9 out of 10, summarizing "A fantastic casual-competitive game that offers untold hours of enjoyment." Positive reviews praised its objective-based gameplay and greater accessibility than its competitors, with Destructoid's Chris Carter giving it a 9.5 out of 10 and calling it "A hallmark of excellence." In a review for PC Gamer, Chris Thursten focused on the game's accessibility, giving it a score of 84 out of 100 and concluding "The most any studio has done to open up a complex genre to a new audience. Inviting, entertaining, and deceptively deep."

The Escapist's CJ Miozzi stated that while its improved accessibility would make it interesting to players normally not interested in the genre, it could be less attractive to experienced players. Giving it 4 out of 5 stars, he summarized that "At the very least, it's a game that all gamers should try." Polygon's Arthur Gies approved of the title's accessibility but expressed worry that "sometimes something [felt] lost along the way," scoring it at 7.5 out of 10.

On release, IGN's Mitch Dyer gave the game a mixed review and concluded, "Heroes of the Storm is a flawed, varied MOBA with terrific team fighting and poor objectives," awarding it a 6.5 out of 10. This review prompted an initially negative reaction from the game's community that turned the score into an internet meme, eventually being recognized by Blizzard themselves in a humorous promotional video for an update to the game. IGN's re-review by Ian Nowakowski awarded it 8 out of 10 in March 2018, saying the game "packs a ton of variety and excellent characters. Some of this MOBA's modes work better than others, but it's a safe bet that it'll deliver a fun match."

During the 19th Annual D.I.C.E. Awards, the Academy of Interactive Arts & Sciences awarded Heroes of the Storm with "Strategy/Simulation Game of the Year". The game was nominated for "Choice Video Game" at the 2017 Teen Choice Awards.
