= Fast Tracks: The Computer Slot Car Construction Kit =

1986 video game

- Publisher(s): NA: Activision; EU: Activision
- Designer(s): Mark Turmell
- Platform(s): Commodore 64
- Release: NA: 1986; EU: 1986
- Genre(s): Racing
- Mode(s): Single-player

Fast Tracks is a racing game designed for the Commodore 64 by Mark Turmell and published by Activision in 1986.

== Gameplay ==
Screenshot

The game involves running into other cars on the track. Each time a player bumps another car off the track, the car returns to the start of the lap, and two seconds are removed from the final time. If the player leaves the track they will have to restart the lap.

A map editor is also available in the game, which can be saved onto the disc. Seven circuits are built-in.

== Reception ==
Roy Wagner reviewed the game for Computer Gaming World, and wrote that "race tracks, that you create, can be sent to friends who don't even have the game. They can then try to beat your best times. This game offers a lot of variety and plays nicely. It comes in a close third to the Racing Destruction Set from EA and Pole Position".

== See also ==
- Racing Destruction Set
- Rally Speedway
