= World of Warcraft: Dragonflight =

2022 expansion set for World of Warcraft

- Developer: Blizzard Entertainment (Note: Additional work by Blizzard Boston)
- Publisher: Blizzard Entertainment
- Director: Ion Hazzikostas
- Producer: Holly Longdale
- Composers: Glenn Stafford, Jake Lefkowitz, Neal Acree, David Arkenstone
- Series: Warcraft
- Platforms: Windows; macOS
- Release: November 28, 2022
- Genre: Massively multiplayer online role-playing game
- Mode: Multiplayer

World of Warcraft: Dragonflight is the ninth expansion pack for the massively multiplayer online role-playing game (MMORPG) World of Warcraft, following Shadowlands. It was announced in April 2022, and released on November 28, 2022.

== Gameplay ==
The Dragon Isles are the main setting of Dragonflight, and are separated into five zones. The four main zones are the Waking Shores, Ohn'ahran Plains, Azure Span, and Thaldraszus, with the neutral city of Valdrakken in Thaldraszus serving as a hub (similarly to Oribos in Shadowlands). The fifth zone, the Forbidden Reach, also serves as the starting area for the Dracthyr race.

Dragonflight raised the level cap to 70, the first increase since the level squish in Shadowlands. Dragonflight also features a revamp of the user interface and talent tree systems, with two tree branches.

Dragonflight includes a new playable race, the Dracthyr, and a new class, the Evoker. The two are combined: Evokers are exclusive to the Dracthyr. Wearing mail armor, Evokers have three specializations available to them: the ranged damage-focused Devastation, support-leaning Augmentation and the healing-orientated Preservation. The Dracthyr can choose to align with either the Alliance or the Horde, similar to the Pandaren introduced in Mists of Pandaria. Dracthyr Evokers are also considered a hero class: they start at level 58 and have a unique starting zone.

Dragonflight features a revamp to the game's profession system, allowing players to place work orders to commission items.

The game introduced a new feature called Dragonriding, allowing players to raise and customize a dragon they can use in a new momentum-based flight system using aerial skills. Flying is available from the start of the expansion, without the need to reach the maximum level.

== Plot ==
=== Dragonflight campaign ===
==== Awakening the Dracthyr ====
After being hidden for 10,000 years following the War of the Ancients, the Dragon Isles, the ancestral home to all dragon-kind, reveals itself on Azeroth. In a secluded area known as the Forbidden Reach, a race of dragonkin soldiers known as the dracthyr awaken from a 20,000-year slumber. Confused about their situation, they discover that they were placed in stasis by their creator, Neltharion the Earth-Warder (later known as Deathwing), the former Aspect of the Black Dragonflight, who feared the potential power they could possess if they weren't under his control due to their ability as evokers to wield the powers of all five dragonflights. The dracthyr quickly find their bearings and free fellow dracthyr such as Scalecommander Emberthal, former leader of the defunct Adamant Vigil faction and Scalecommander Sarkareth, leader of the Ebon Scales faction.

A group known as the Primalists soon invade the Forbidden Reach seeking to free their imprisoned leader, Raszageth the Storm-Eater, an ancient proto-dragon and one of the four Primal Incarnates who wish to end the reign of the Dragon Aspects. Raszageth and the other three incarnates were previously imprisoned during the events of the War of the Scaleborn, a series of conflicts between the Aspects and Incarnates that took place 20,000 years prior. In the ensuing battle between the dracthyr and the Primalists, Raszageth is freed from her prison which forces the dracthyr to evacuate the Forbidden Reach. Seeking to learn about their new world, many dracthyr choose to join the Alliance and the Horde while Sarkareth, who had grown disillusioned with serving the Dragon Aspects due to their treatment of lesser dragonkin, leaves with the Ebon Scales to pursue their own destiny.

==== Empowering the Oathstones ====
The Alliance and the Horde launch a joint expedition to the Dragon Isles, where enemies of old awaken just as the continent does itself, threatening the ancient home of the five dragonflights. The Aspects of the dragonflights also attempt to reawaken their inert power by relighting their own Oathstones, which went dormant upon the destruction of the Dragon Soul that led to Deathwing's downfall. (Note: During the events of the Cataclysm expansion.)

In the Waking Shores region, Alexstrasza the Life-Binder, the Aspect of the Red Dragonflight, attempts to keep unhatched dragon eggs from becoming tainted by the Primalists by defending the Ruby Lifeshrine, where the eggs of all dragonflights are nurtured to preserve the future of dragonkind. Raszageth soon launches an assault on the shrine, but she is ultimately repelled with the unexpected assistance from Wrathion, the Black Prince, one of the last known black dragons on Azeroth. Wrathion requests Alexstrasza to spare some forces to assist him and his Blacktalon allies in reclaiming the nearby Obsidian Citadel, an ancient black dragon fortress, but she refuses, choosing to continue protecting the Ruby Lifeshrine from further Primalist incursion.

Enlisting the aid of any who will beckon to his call, Wrathion lays siege to the Obsidian Citadel, where a race of half-giants known as the djaradin have taken control. Though heavily outmatched, the Black Prince is aided by the unexpected arrival of the black dragon Sabellian, one of Neltharion's sons, who returned to the Dragon Isles with the Obsidian Brood, black dragons who resided on Outland and were no longer corrupted by the Old Gods. The two leaders reluctantly work together to evict the djaradin and restore the Black Dragonflight's Oathstone. They then journey to the Ruby Lifeshrine with a clutch of black dragon eggs, which restores the Red Dragonflight's Oathstone, though tensions between Wrathion and Sabellian arise over who will lead the Black Dragonflight.

In the Ohn'ahran Plains region, a coalition of Maruuk centaur clans gather to reforge their ancient pact with the Green Dragonflight and combat the Primalists who have invaded the area. However, the Maruuk are betrayed from within by the warlike Nokhud Clan, who ally with the Primalists and accept their gifts of elemental power which they use to capture the wild god Ohn'ahra. Merithra, daughter of the former Aspect of the Green Dragonflight Ysera the Awakened, soon arrives with her son Gerithus and is caught unaware of the betrayal, costing the lives of one of her kin. Merithra and the Green Dragonflight then work with the Maruuk to safeguard the Ancient Bough, where the green dragons first forged a connection with the Emerald Dream. Together they defeat the invading Primalists and rescue Ohn'ahra, renewing the vows of companionship between them and restoring the Green Dragonflight's Oathstone.

In the Azure Span region, Kalecgos, the second Aspect of the Blue Dragonflight, plans to revive the ley lines of arcane magic that flow throughout the region to reactivate the Azure Archives, a vast library of magical artifacts collected by the Blue Dragonflight, but due to the rot and decay of the land caused by the local gnolls and their use of decay magic, this goal appeared unattainable. With the aid of Archmage Khadgar, the local Iskaara tuskarr tribe and under the guidance of a simulacrum of Sindragosa, the former prime consort of the first Aspect of the Blue Dragonflight Malygos the Spellweaver, Kalecgos learns that the only way to reactivate the Blue Dragonflight's Oathstone is through reuniting his now disbanded flight. (Note: During the events of the Jaina Proudmoore: Tides of War novel) When Raszageth and the Primalists attempt to destroy Vakthros, a convergence point for the ley lines, Kalecgos works with Khadgar and the Kirin Tor to defend it and they are soon joined by his ally Senegos, leader of the Azurewing brood of blue dragons, strengthening the bonds of their flight and restoring their Oathstone.

In the city of Valdrakken, the largest settlement on the Dragon Isles located within the Thaldraszus region, Alexstrasza meets with Kalecgos and Nozdormu the Timeless One, the Aspect of the Bronze Dragonflight, and they discuss their next move to stop Raszageth and the Primalists. They discover multiple Primalist infiltrators have made their way into the city, in an attempt to incite rebellion among the lesser dragonkin. At the Temporal Conflux, where the Bronze Dragonflight focuses their watch over the timeways, Chronormu (Chromie) successfully captures the infinite dragon Eternus who seeks to corrupt the Bronze Dragonflight's Oathstone. Eternus soon breaks free and as Chromie intercepts her, they are both sent spiraling through portals that take them to various points in time. They are eventually found in the ancient past during the era when the Black Empire ruled over Azeroth and are successfully returned to the present. Nozdormu spares Eternus after she aided Chromie while trapped in the past, and the Oathstone is restored, though the Infinite Dragon warns Nozdormu of his fated transformation into Murozond, the leader of the Infinite Dragonflight.

==== Defending the Dragon Isles ====
Seeking to unite the tuskarr tribes, the Iskarra tuskarr chieftain hoped to reopen trade with the isolationist Uktulut tribe in the Waking Shores. They discover that the Uktulut chieftain had fallen into a deep depression following the loss of his hunting companion who was killed by the djaradin, but he's able to overcome his grief by rallying the tribe together and purging the djaradin from the area.

In Thaldraszus, archaeologists of the Dragonscale Expedition discover a titan-forged door that had been sealed by the titan-keeper Tyr. After breaking the seal, they discover the historical attributes of each of the Dragon Aspects, as well as the detailed experiments that Tyr conducted on proto-dragons by imbuing them with different elemental abilities.

Alexstrasza, Kalecgos and Nozdormu head to Tyrhold, a large titan facility built by Tyr, and attempt to discover the secrets of a parting gift left to them by Tyr before his death millennia ago. With the help of the titan-watcher Koranos, they use the gift to reactivate Tyrhold's forge, which creates a body identical to Tyr's. Though the body was lifeless, the Aspects divulge that by recovering Tyr's memories they can fully restore him.

At the Ancient Bough, a drakonid loyal to the Primalists assaults the portal to the Emerald Dream intent to destroy the seed of a world tree that had previously been planted within by Tyrande Whisperwind, the leader of the night elves, following the destruction of her people's home. (Note: During the events of the Battle for Azeroth expansion) To counter their assault, Ysera, who had become bound to the Shadowlands, (Note: During the events of the Shadowlands expansion) is returned to Azeroth but in exchange, Malfurion Stormrage takes her place in Ardenweald. With Ysera's return, the Primalist forces are evicted from the Dream, and she encourages her daughter Merithra to become the new Aspect of the Green Dragonflight while vowing to protect the world tree seed from future threats.

With the five Oathstones restored, only the Mother Oathstone remained to be activated so that the Aspect's powers could be returned once more. Raszageth soon interrupts Alexstrasza's attempts to empower the dormant Oathstone, and heads to the Vault of the Incarnates to free her imprisoned kin. Kalecgos, Khadgar and their allies follow Raszageth inside the vault and successfully defeat many powerful Primalists within. They finally confront Raszageth who falls in battle, but not before she is able to release the other three Primal Incarnates: Fyrakk the Blazing, Vyranoth the Frozenheart, and Iridikron the Stonescaled, who are unleashed onto the Dragon Isles.

=== Embers of Neltharion campaign ===
==== Return to the Forbidden Reach ====
Eager to avenge the death of their sister, Iridikron, Vyranoth, and Fyrakk venture to the Forbidden Reach where Iridikron retrieves a mysterious relic and Fyrakk searches for a way to reach Aberrus, Neltharion's hidden underground laboratory, and claim the shadowflame magic that powers its molten forges. The dracthyr soon return to the Forbidden Reach to reclaim their former home and uncover knowledge about their past. Emberthal and the black dragon Ebyssian, another son of Neltharion, confront Sarkareth, who now leads the Sundered Flame (formerly known as the Ebon Scales) and learn of his attempts to reach Aberrus first and claim Neltharion's secrets for himself.

==== Neltharion's Legacy ====
Having discovered Aberrus' location, Fyrakk drills a borehole into the earth beneath the Dragon Isles, opening a tunnel to the Zaralek Caverns, an open expanse that is home to the mole-like Loamm niffen and their drogbar allies. After entering the cavern, Ebyssian, Wrathion, and Sabellian begin to hear whispers similar to those of the now-defeated Old Gods that previously corrupted the mind of Neltharion and much of the Black Dragonflight. They find the source of the whispers in a nearby caldera, where Fyrakk infuses himself with shadowflame. In their attempt to stop him, Sabellion and Ebyssian are injured and Fyrakk assaults the nearby niffen settlement of Loamm to demonstrate his new abilities. Having forged an alliance with the djaradin and their leader Igira the Cruel, Fyrakk and the Primalists soon began assaulting the residents of the Ohn'ahran plains and the Azure Span.

Emberthal confronts Sarkareth once again in the Zaralek Caverns, who reveals his plan to subjugate all dracthyr that refuse to join him by reforging the Oathbinder, a titan artifact that Neltharion used to control the dracthyr before its destruction by Raszageth, an act that led to the dracthyr's imprisonment. Emberthal is forced to destroy the broken Oathbinder, causing Sarkareth and his forces to shift their focus to Aberrus while several dracthyr that had grown disillusioned with Sarkareth's leadership defect from the Sundered Flame. Wrathion and Sabellion follow Sarkareth into Aberrus, while Ebyssian and Emberthal hope to unite the scattered dracthyr and help steer them along a better path.

Within Aberrus, Wrathion, Sabellion, and their allies are guided through the facility by an echo of Neltharion and encounter a multitude of Neltharion's failed experiments, including those that led to the creation of the dracthyr. The echo divulges how he expects his offspring to withstand the onslaught of his creations and earn the right to become his heir. Wrathion and Sabellion become disgusted by Neltharion's actions and encounter Sarkareth within Neltharion's sanctum, who infuses himself with void magic but is soon defeated and with his final breath comes to the realization that pursuing Neltharion's legacy ultimately led to his downfall. Word of Sarkareth's defeat quickly reaches Ebyssian and Emberthal, who quickly join the others in Aberrus. Accepting that their father's legacy can lead to only destruction after witnessing the horrors of Aberrus, Wrathion and Sabellion put their differences aside and embrace their respective roles within the Black Dragonflight, electing Ebyssian to become their Aspect. They bring this news to Alexstrasza, who gladly welcomes Ebyssian and announces that for the first time since Neltharion's betrayal during the War of the Ancients, the five dragonflights are united once again.

Hoping to revive the lifeless body of Tyr, Koranos travels to Tyr's tomb in the Tirisfal Glades and works with Travard, the last remaining member of Tyr's Guard, to recover a titan disc that contains Tyr's memories. They soon witness the memory of Tyr's death during a battle with minions of the Old Gods and discover that Tyr's greatest fear was the eventual corruption of the Dragon Aspects, a prophecy that ultimately came true for Neltharion, Malygos (Note: During the events of the Wrath of the Lich King expansion) and Ysera (Note: During the events of the Legion expansion) while Nozdormu awaits his seemingly inevitable transformation into Murozond.

At the Veiled Ossuary, a memorial for deceased dragons, the elderly Senegos updates the gravestones of their fallen brethren and hopes to put to rest the spirits of Malygos and Sindragosa. Using the empowered Oathstone, Kalecgos calls for all blue dragons to gather at the Azure Archives and travels across Azeroth to bring a few scattered dragons home. With the combined magic of the reunited blue dragons, the spirits of Malygos and Sindragosa are finally put to rest. Upon their success, Kalecgos finally reforms the Blue Dragonflight and Senegos, eldest of all blue dragons, contently succumbs to his old age now that his people are united once again.

==== Fractures in Time ====
Seeking to travel into the past, Iridikron forms an alliance with the Infinite Dragonflight, led by Chrono-Lord Deios, who seeks to bring about the rise of Murozond. Together, they breach the Temporal Conflux, causing mass instability across the timeways resulting in time rifts opening into alternate versions of Azeroth. Soridormi, Nozdormu's prime consort, works to close these rifts by defeating the fractured causalities within, while Chromie deals with several alternate versions of herself, including one aligned with the Infinite Dragonflight, and returns her variants to their correct timelines.

The Temporal Conflux is soon overrun by the Infinite Dragonflight, and Chromie travels into the ancient past and arrives shortly after the death of the massive proto-dragon Galakrond at the hands of the future Dragon Aspects, still in their proto-dragon forms. Chromie and the future Aspects join forces and are able to stop Iridikron from acquiring Galakrond's essence but Deios is successful in corrupting the past Nozdormu into Murozond. Choosing to save her friend, Chromie reverses time and stops Deios from corrupting Nozdormu but this allows Iridikron to use his mysterious relic to absorb Galakrond's essence, transforming it into the "Dark Heart", before leaving through a void gate to deliver it his ally, "the Harbinger". Returning to the present, Nozdormu thanks Chromie for her efforts and now believes that his transformation into Murozond is no longer inevitable. Nozdormu then perceives a vision of the growing world tree Amirdrassil, located within the Emerald Dream, burning at the hands of the Primalists. While Iridikron's schemes remained a concern, Alexstrasza urges that they must prepare for Fyrakk and Vyranoth's impending assault.

Sometime later, Alexstrasza meets with Vyranoth in secret and attempts to dissuade her from continuing to aid Iridikron and Fyrakk. However, Vyranoth remained unmoved due to the Aspects having previously allowed the Titans to force their will onto dragon whelplings still within their eggs instead of allowing them to choose for themselves.

=== Guardians of the Dream campaign ===
==== Fury Incarnate ====
Seeking access to the Emerald Dream, Fyrakk abducts Gerithus but while interrogating him he is interrupted by Vyranoth who claims that his methods are too similar to the Titan's forced will over dragonkind. Slowly succumbing to the shadowflames corruption, Fyrakk attacks his sister but quickly comes to his senses and leaves. Planning to launch a full-scale assault on Amirdrassil, Fyrakk bolsters his army of Primalists and djaradin by recruiting the Druids of the Flame, a group of night elves twisted by fire who were previously defeated in the Firelands, and promises to restore their immortality. Seeing that her brother only seeks more power for himself, Vyranoth travels to Valdrakken and warns Alexstrasza of Fyrakk's true goal, not to burn down Amirdrassil, but to twist it to his whim. Before she can depart, Alexstrasza requests that Vyranoth join her and stand against Fyrakk. While initially hesitant, Vyranoth ultimately accepts.

In the Azure Span, the remaining members of the Sundered Flame continue their wayward goals, even after Sarkareth's defeat. Hoping to finally unite the dracthyr, Emberthal unsuccessfully attempts to communicate with them until Dezran, Sarkareth's former second-in-command, arrives and convinces the dracthyr to mend their differences. Finally united, the dracthyr meet in Valdrakken and the Sundered Flame becomes the Ebon Scales once again with Emberthal as their new leader.

Concerned that the Infinite Dragonflight will continue their attempts to bring about the rise of Murozond, Chromie convinces Eternus to meet with Nozdormu. Eternus explains that the death of her sister, and the Bronze Dragonflight's refusal to reverse time and save her, led to Eternus joining the Infinite Dragonflight. Nozdormu takes Eternus back in time and allows her to attempt to save her sister multiple times, only to discover that her death allowed a hidden clutch of bronze dragon eggs to remain safe. Returning to the present, Nozdormu and Eternus come to an understanding and agree to work together. They soon travel to Tyrhold, and Eternus agrees to help locate a titan disc containing Tyr's memories that were previously stolen by Deios from Uldaman, a titan-keeper vault. In order to protect Tyr's body, Travard rebuilds the Tyr's Guard by recruiting paladins dedicated to representing Tyr's core values. Eternus soon locates the titan disc, discovering that Deios had traveled into the past and given it to Elisande, the since-deposed ruler of Suramar City.

==== Assault on Amirdrassil ====
With the aid of the Druids of the Flame, led by Ashendir Hartwood, Fyrakk tears his way into the Emerald Dream using Fyr'alath, an enchanted axe imbued with shadowflame, and begins his assault while corrupting many denizens of the Dream to forcefully aid him. Merithra gathers the Green Dragonflight and the night elves of Darnassus led by Tyrande Whisperwind who enter the Dream to stop Fyrakk's invasion. Seeking allies to help defend Amirdrassil, Vyranoth attempts to recruit her former lieutenants, the Claws of Vyranoth, who were forced to join Fyrakk after their leader seemingly abandoned them when she allied with Alexstrasza. She and Wrathion then seek out the Netherwing Dragonflight of Outland and the Thorignir storm dragons sworn to the titan-keeper Odyn, successfully recruiting them to their cause and introducing the wayward dragonflights to the Dragon Isles for the first time.

At the Eye of Ysera, where the Green Dragonflight focuses its efforts watching over the Emerald Dream, Merithra defends it against an assault from Igira and the djaradin. As Amirdrassil begins to bloom by drawing power from the Wellspring Temple, Fyrakk begins his final assault with the intent to use the temple's power and the world tree's connection with Azeroth to consume the planet in flames. Merithra and Tyrande's forces suffer heavy losses while engaging the Primalists, djaradin and Druids of the Flame but Alexstrasza helps summon reinforcements into the Emerald Dream, rallying the combined dragonflights, denizens of the dragon isles and the heroes of Azeroth together to stand against Fyrakk. Together they defeat Ashendir but Fyrakk breaches the temple's barrier and enters with the remainder of his forces while Merithra, Tyrande and their allies follow him inside.

Within the Wellspring Temple, the Druids of the Flame summon their master, Smolderon the Firelord, who wishes to expand his influence into the Emerald Dream. Fyrakk's dwindling forces are ultimately defeated and both Igira and Smolderon are killed, with Fyrakk absorbing the essence of the latter, empowering himself further. Fyrakk is soon confronted at Amirdrassil, but is killed by the Dragon Aspects and Vyranoth before he can enact the final step of his plan. With Fyrakk's death, Amirdrassil blooms and crosses over into the physical world, while Azeroth herself empowers the Aspects with new aspectral powers, who pledge to protect the planet from future threats, with Vyranoth joining them as the new sixth Aspect.

Soon after, Travard and the Tyr's Guard are sent back in time by Nozdormu to undertake their mission to retrieve the titan disc containing Tyr's memories from Suramar. They confront Elisande, who willingly gives up the disc after revealing that she has obtained the knowledge she sought before departing. After returning to the present, the disc is combined with Tyr's reforged body and he is successfully revived. Reuniting with Alexstrasza and Nozdormu, they reveal to Tyr how Azeroth has changed in the thousands of years since his death. Hoping that Tyr will act as a symbol to unite all paladins, the Tyr's Guard agrees to help Tyr learn more about the modern world and find a new purpose.

The dragonflights and the heroes of Azeroth later gather beneath Amirdrassil and celebrate their victory over the Primalists. While Tyrande plans to settle her displaced people at the new world tree, both Jaina Proudmoore and Thrall claim to have experienced strange visions since Amirdrassil bloomed and Khadgar expresses concern after hearing reports of the mysterious Harbinger. With her vow to protect Amirdrassil now fulfilled, Ysera departs and returns to the Shadowlands.

==== Seeds of Renewal ====
With the Dragon Isles finally safe from the Primalist threat, the Aspects gather at Valdrakken once more and thank their mortal allies for helping to reclaim their home. Kalecgos informs Khadgar that he intends to step down from his position at the Council of Six, the ruling body of the Kirin Tor, to focus on leading the Blue Dragonflight and Wrathion discusses with Sabellian his plans to depart the Dragon Isles and hunt down Iridikron. Vyranoth, who now represents both the Netherwing Dragonflight and Thorignir as the Aspect of Storms, reveals that she was contacted by Iridikron and decided to meet with him alone. He informed Vyranoth of his intentions to defeat the Titans with his ally the Harbinger, and warned her not to interfere before departing.

At Amirdrassil, the Night Elves begin to settle in their new capital city, Bel'ameth. Tyrande is soon reunited with Malfurion now that Ysera has returned to the Shadowlands, and together they encourage their daughter Shandris Feathermoon to lead their people now that they finally have a new home.

Meanwhile, Genn Greymane, the ruler of the human kingdom of Gilneas, leads his people to reclaim their ruined home after they were previously forced to evacuate due to an invasion by the Forsaken. Now settled by the fanatical Scarlet Crusade, Genn reluctantly allies with the Forsaken, who wish to atone for their past, and defeat their shared enemy. They successfully infiltrate Gilneas City, defeat the leader of the Crusade's forces and the Forsaken then leave Gilnean lands for good. Now that his people have finally reclaimed their home after many years away, the aging Genn abdicates the Gilnean throne to his daughter Tess Greymane, while lamenting his past mistakes.

==== Dark Heart ====
Concerned by the growing reports of individuals across Azeroth receiving strange visions known as the Radiant Song, Khadgar requests his old friend Alleria Windrunner, the first void elf, to investigate the Harbinger and learn the purpose of the Dark Heart. She first travels to Telogrus Rift, home of the void elves, and discovers reports of void activity across Azeroth. While attempting to track down a missing void elf scout, the Harbinger whispers to Alleria and taunts her with visions of the past. She then returns to Telogrus Rift to discover it under attack from creatures of the void, but Locus-Walker, her ethereal mentor, soon banishes them. Locus-Walker reveals that the Harbinger's identity is Xal'atath, an ancient void entity previously allied with the Old Gods who was trapped within a dagger before her release. He theorizes that the Radiant Song is a warning from Azeroth herself and that Xal'atath seeks to summon the Void Lords to consume Azeroth, much like they had previously done to K'aresh, the ethereal homeworld.

== Setting ==
The game is set three years after the events of Shadowlands, and largely takes place on the Dragon Isles, the ancestral homeland of the dragons. Over 20,000 years before World of Warcraft, the ancient ancestors of modern dragons, known simply as "proto-dragons", made a deal with a race of godlike beings known as the Titans, who empowered them with magic to transform them into the modern dragons. The dragons are divided into five dragonflights, distinct organizations each led by a powerful Dragon lord known as the Aspects, and include many dragon offshoots. These offshoots are called dragonkin, and include the Dracthyr, who can alternate between draconic and humanoid forms.

In the game's lore, the Dracthyr were created by Neltharion, an ancient dragon and the former Aspect of the Black dragonflight, who later became a villain known as Deathwing. Neltharion combined the resourcefulness of mortal races and the power of all five dragonflights in order to form the ideal soldier. While the Evoker was the only playable Dracthyr class upon their introduction, Blizzard expressed an interest in adding more classes to the race over time. Associate game director Morgan Day stated that while the Dracthyr were just waking up and discovering their abilities, in the future they might learn skills from the other denizens of Azeroth, enabling different combat styles.

In the time after the rise of the Dragonflights, the remaining proto-dragons fell under the leadership of the Primalists, traditionalists who rejected the power of the Titans and sought to become the dominant power in Azeroth. The leaders of the Primalists, the Primal Incarnates, were sealed away by the Aspects. The ancient feud between the Aspects and the Primalists serves as the primary focus of the expansion's plot.

== Reception ==
Reception

Aggregate score
Aggregator	Score
Metacritic	82/100

Review score
Publication	Score
PC Gamer (US)	80/100

Dragonflight received "generally favorable" reviews with a score of 82 on Metacritic. PC Gamer scored the expansion 80/100, claiming that while the expansion wasn't "thrilling", it did feel like a "fresh start for a 20-year old videogame". Screen Rant described Dragonflight as "compelling" and "fantastic", scoring the game 9/10, though they noted that "for all the new...innovations, it's ultimately the same game underneath, for better or worse." Destructoid scored it 85/100, claiming that "As Legion took players out of the dour Warlords of Draenor, WoW has risen from the ashes once more", which has been sentiment shared by many outlets and fans alike compared to Shadowlands.

During the 26th Annual D.I.C.E. Awards, the Academy of Interactive Arts & Sciences nominated Dragonflight for "Role-Playing Game of the Year".

=== Dracthyrs ===
Scalecommander Emberthal, an NPC and example of the new dracthyr race that was introduced in the expansion.

The new abilities manifested by the Dracthyr were generally praised and seen as modernizing the game. John Carson of Game Informer lauded the empowerment mechanic as adding elements of more modern MMOs like Lost Ark, further stating that "the fantasy of becoming a dragon race and having a class built around the skills and abilities inherent to the species is unique within World of Warcraft and is flavorfully magnificent". Ryan Gilliam of Polygon called the class "impressively modern", describing the Dracthyr as "surprisingly mobile" and "flashy". He summed up the experience of playing the class as "exciting" and "uniquely Warcraft". Len Hafer of PC Gamer said that the Dracthyr made World of Warcraft feel like a different game, calling their aerial maneuvers "completely bonkers" and saying that they made "Azeroth feel new again". He described the race as "almost the culmination of what the ideal Warcraft experience is meant to be: It's fun, it's flashy, it's excessive, and it's kinda silly". While noting that the lore behind the race was "muddled", he nevertheless stated that their new mechanical elements made up for it, and that their ability design made him feel like he was "playing a much snappier action game than WoW truly is under the hood". Claire Tabari of Laptop Mag described the Dracthyr as "all of our hopes and dreams come true", calling their dragon forms "awesome" and also praising the fact that they can function as a healer.

One criticized aspect of the Dracthyr was their lack of customization compared to other characters. Fraser Brown of PC Gamer recommended that players use the "Chosen Identity" skill to maintain human form outside battle, saying that it made existing armor sets work better and reminded players that they were a shapeshifter. Their human form having unique gameplay benefits was also controversial, with Lauren Bergin of PCGamesN stating that she was "a little deflated" that it offered an extra healing buff, as she preferred the dragon form. She noted that many fans continued to play permanently as a dragon regardless, calling it "part of the class fantasy to be a dragon". Tabari noted that players were unhappy with the lack of other classes besides Evoker, agreeing that they may become overabundant, but noted that new classes may be introduced in the future. In contrast, Michael Kelly of Dot Esports described the necessity to play in dragon form while in combat as "one of the biggest turn-offs" for players, even causing players who wished to remain in human form to resort to temporarily changing their character's race using an in-game item, and praised the removal of the requirement in War Within. He noted that fans had trepidation about the similarity of Dracthyr visages to Blood Elves.

Oli Welsh of Polygon, while still believing the race was fun to play as, nevertheless called the Dracthyr an "afterthought", saying that they were "clearly invented to fill a hole", in contrast to other races, and noting that "their introductory story bends over backwards to explain why they have never been mentioned before". Also calling their appearance "conventional" and "somewhat anodyne", he described it as "cosplay-ready" and "with a hint of the furry about it", expressing his wish that it had been more "genre-bending" and "distinctive" like the draenei or worgen. Similarly, he described the class's skills as lacking the same uniqueness as other races in the game, saying that "you could easily imagine it popping up in any other fantasy game".
