= Rock n' Roll Racing =

1993 video game

- North American SNES cover art
- Developer: Silicon & Synapse (Note: Additional work by Software Creations)
- Publisher: Interplay Productions: JP: Namco; Blizzard Entertainment (GBA, Definitive Edition)
- Designer: Alan Pavlish
- Programmers: Bob Fitch; Patrick Wyatt; Ayman Adham
- Artists: Samwise Didier; Ronald Millar Sr. Joeyray Hall
- Composers: Tim Follin; Geoff Follin; Matthew Cannon
- Platforms: Super Nintendo Entertainment System, Mega Drive/Genesis, Game Boy Advance; Definitive Edition; Nintendo Switch, PlayStation 4, Windows, Xbox One
- Release: SNES: NA: June 4, 1993; EU: March 31, 1994; Mega Drive/Genesis: NA: November 1994; EU: December 2, 1994; GBA: NA: June 23, 2003; EU: August 15, 2003; Definitive Edition; February 19, 2021
- Genre: Racing
- Modes: Single-player, multiplayer

Rock n' Roll Racing is a vehicular combat-based racing video game developed by Silicon & Synapse and published by Interplay Productions for the Super Nintendo Entertainment System in 1993 and the Mega Drive/Genesis in 1994. The game prominently features a number of popular heavy metal and rock songs in its soundtrack, hence the game's title. After Silicon & Synapse rebranded into Blizzard Entertainment, a port to the Game Boy Advance was released in 2003. In celebration of the company's 30th anniversary, a new version titled Definitive Edition alongside emulated re-releases of the original game were re-released for Nintendo Switch, PlayStation 4, Windows, and Xbox One as part of the Blizzard Arcade Collection in February 2021.

Rock n' Roll Racing was initially developed as RPMII, a sequel to the company's previous game RPM Racing. At the end of the project, Interplay marketing added licensed music and changed the name to Rock n' Roll Racing. It is also similar in gameplay to Racing Destruction Set where it got its logic/AI engine and Rare's 1988 NES game R.C. Pro-Am.

== Gameplay ==
The game pits four racers against each other, with up to two of them being player-controlled from a colourful collection of comic-book-inspired humans and aliens, and the rest being AI opponents; "Rip" and "Shred", who appear in all races, plus a third character unique to each planet/level in one-player mode. Each race consists of four laps around tracks viewed from an isometric perspective, which enables players to discern the presence of frequent sloping sections spread throughout the game's various tracks. In addition to navigating the turns, racers must also maneuver hills and dips without falling or jumping over the guard rail at the track's edge.

A race on the SNES version

While it is a racing game, there is heavy emphasis on attacking competitor's vehicles; since the cars always reappear with full health just a few seconds after blowing up, the only "harm" done is falling behind in the race. Players are rewarded with a monetary "attack bonus" each time they provide the finishing blow against another car using their forward or rear weapons (and a similar "lapping bonus" when they gain a full one-lap lead on an opponent during the race). In accordance with the continual destruction and restoration of the racing vehicles, the tracks are littered with mines and health power-ups, as well as money power-ups. Other hazards include oil slicks, snow drifts, and lava, depending on the planet hosting the race.

Players are updated on the race by commentator "Loudmouth Larry" (Larry "Supermouth" Huffman), who makes enthusiastic comments like "The stage is set, the green flag drops!" (or "Let the carnage begin!"), and "[player name] is about to blow!" at appropriate moments during the race.

Between races, players can spend the money they have earned on more advanced equipment for their vehicle (engines, tires, shocks, and shielding) or on increasing their capacity for the frontal weapon (energy blasts or missiles), rear weapon (slip sauce or mines), and turbo boost (jump jets or nitro boosts), each of which can max out at seven. Despite their limited capacity, every vehicle will have its weapon and boost charges replenished at the completion of each lap in a race. Racers can also buy more advanced vehicle models; however, all equipment and weapons upgrades are lost when a new vehicle is purchased.

The first three drivers to complete a race are awarded both money and points according to the final standings. Points are required for advancement to the next racing division or the next planet, with two divisions on each planet. A player who has not obtained enough points during a division's racing season must repeat the division, again starting with zero points, but all changes to the player's money and car remain in effect. In two-player mode, when only one player has sufficient points, the character in charge of advancement asks "Leave your loser friend behind?", allowing the leading player to continue alone by removing the other player from the game. The dropped player can continue from that point later by using their most recent password, once the game is reset.

=== Music ===
Rock n' Roll Racing is widely known for its soundtrack. Originally, Silicon & Synapse wanted to use songs by ZZ Top but the fee was too high. They instead enlisted a company that provided low-cost licensed music in public settings.

The songs were uncredited but included:

- "Bad to the Bone" by George Thorogood and the Destroyers
- "Highway Star" by Deep Purple
- "Paranoid" by Black Sabbath (Note: This song was not included in the Blizzard Arcade Collection due to licensing issues.)
- "Peter Gunn" by Henry Mancini (Note: The Definitive Edition included a cover version by Gary Hoey.)
- "Born to Be Wild" by Steppenwolf
- "Radar Love" by Golden Earring (Sega Genesis and Definitive Edition only)
- "Breaking the Law" by Judas Priest (Definitive Edition only)
- "Red Barchetta" by Rush (Definitive Edition only)
- "Power of the Horde" by Elite Tauren Chieftain (Definitive Edition only)

=== Passwords ===
Passwords are given out at the beginning of each new "racing season" (each planet has its own definition of how many races make up a season, but early advancement will automatically start a new season), and they are located at the bottom of the F/X screen (accessible from the menu between races). These passwords are a complex code, consisting of three 4-digit sections, and they dictate everything about the players' progress: the character used, the vehicle type and color, weapons and parts upgrades, racing planet and division, difficulty setting, and money. The Game Boy Advance version of the game uses an EEPROM chip to save the player's progress instead of the password system.

The password codes only allow the player to save a maximum of $999,990 (six digits); if there are more than six figures in the bank account, the password truncates the leftmost digits over six (e.g. if there's $1,002,000 when the player quits, there will be only $2,000 when using the password to continue later). Due to the two-player password function, it's possible to "cheat" by entering the same password for both players or by entering passwords for players who were at entirely different points in the game. The password with the lowest difficulty setting and on the earliest planet and racing division will be used as the basis for play from then on, which allows a Warrior-skill character with a maxed-out vehicle to race against Rookie-class AIs in the Rookie skill mode.

Though a password-generator QBASIC program exists, the passwords it creates often result in a glitch, causing the player to race on glitchy planets—that exist only as a bug and can crash the game—after racing on Inferno. In the Rookie skill mode, however, they work perfectly, as long as one doesn't try to take the character beyond the third planet using the password.

A second password generator has been written in JavaScript and limits the available planets to reflect the chosen skill mode while retaining the ability to customize any other aspect of the data stored in the password.

== Release ==
A 3DO Interactive Multiplayer version of Rock n' Roll Racing was announced to be in development and slated to be published by Interplay during E3 1995, but this version was never released for unknown reasons.

In 2003, Blizzard released an Adobe Shockwave-based demo version of the Game Boy Advance port featuring one track on its website.

In 2014, a demo version of the game featuring three tracks was added to Battle.net, emulated through ZSNES. This version has all rock music tracks changed to simple MIDI music, because the music license expired.

=== Blizzard Arcade Collection ===
In celebration of the company's 30th anniversary, Blizzard Entertainment and Digital Eclipse released a compilation called Blizzard Arcade Collection in February 2021, for Nintendo Switch, PlayStation 4, Windows, and Xbox One. The collection includes three Blizzard's classic video games: The Lost Vikings, Blackthorne and Rock n' Roll Racing, with two additional games: The Lost Vikings 2 and RPM Racing. Some of the modern features for the Definitive Edition include 16:9 resolution, 4-player split-screen, rewinding and saving of game progress, watching replays, and adding graphic filters to change the look of player's game in the SNES and Genesis versions, as well as a togglable option between the SNES and Genesis soundtracks, with new instrumental chiptune versions of songs found in the Definitive Edition, inspired by the SNES and Genesis versions, and the master recordings of the soundtrack in CD quality. Larry "Supermouth" Huffman re-recorded lines from the original game, as well as recording brand new lines, for this release in the Definitive Edition.

== Reception ==
Reception

Aggregate score
Aggregator	Score
GameRankings	82.67% (SNES); 82.29% (GBA)

Review scores
Publication	Score
Game Informer	9/10, 8.5/10, 8.25/10
Nintendo Power	3.775/5 (Note: Nintendo Power scored Rock n' Roll Racing 4.3/5 for graphics/sound, 3.6/5 for play control, 3.5/5 for challenge, and 3.7/5 for theme/fun.)
Official Nintendo Magazine	SNES: 88/100

The game's rock soundtrack was one of its most acclaimed aspects; Andy of Game Informer claimed it was one of the best on the SNES. GamePro gave the Genesis version a mixed review. They praised the Vs. mode and "rockin'" soundtrack with driving-appropriate tunes, but criticized the weak sound effects and remarked that the graphics and digitized voice are noticeably worse than in the Super NES version.

Super Gamer reviewed the SNES version and gave an overall score of 90% writing: "Awesome rock soundtracks, plus plenty of vehicles, firepower, tracks and planets. A bit repetitive in one-player though."

=== Accolades ===
Rock N' Roll Racing was awarded Best Driving Game of 1993 by Electronic Gaming Monthly.

GameSpot named Rock n' Roll Racing the best Game Boy Advance game of July 2003.

IGN placed Rock n' Roll Racing 72nd on their Top 100 SNES Games of All Time. In 2018, Complex placed Rock n' Roll Racing 84th on their "The Best Super Nintendo Games of All Time". In 1996, GamesMaster rated the SNES version #96 in its "Top 100 Games of All Time".

== Legacy ==
A sequel to the original Rock n' Roll Racing was made for PlayStation console by Interplay in 1997. The game was sold in Europe as Rock & Roll Racing 2: Red Asphalt and in the United States as just Red Asphalt. It has a comic book art style in the character's profiles and ending videos and an RPG-like system to upgrade each character's driving/combat skills.

In December 2013, Motor Rock, an unauthorized 3D remake of Rock n' Roll Racing, was released on Steam by Yard Team. A week after release, the game was removed from Steam.
