= RPM Racing =

1991 video game

- North American cover art
- Developer: Silicon & Synapse
- Publishers: NA: Interplay Productions; JP: Victor Musical Industries
- Producer: Michael Quarles
- Programmer: Allen Adham
- Artist: Rob Nesler
- Composer: George "The Fat Man" Sanger
- Engine: Ported from Racing Destruction Set
- Platform: Super Nintendo Entertainment System
- Release: NA: November 1991; JP: March 19, 1992
- Genre: Racing
- Modes: Single-player, multiplayer

RPM Racing (short for Radical Psycho Machine Racing) is an isometric racing video game developed by Silicon & Synapse and published by Interplay Productions for the Super Nintendo Entertainment System (SNES). It was released in November 1991, as the first game from Silicon & Synapse, the company that became Blizzard Entertainment. It is one of the first American-developed games for the SNES.

RPM Racing is a remake of the 1985 Electronic Arts game Racing Destruction Set. The core logic engine and track editor were ported from the original game. Development was completed in approximately four to six months. A spiritual successor, Rock n' Roll Racing, appeared in 1993. The game's reviews were mixed, with critics noting its functional but uninspired gameplay and bland graphics, a result of using a high-resolution graphics mode that severely limited its color palette. In 2021, Blizzard Entertainment re-released RPM Racing as part of the Blizzard Arcade Collection for modern platforms.

== Gameplay ==
RPM Racing is an isometric racing game where players compete to earn prize money. The game includes single-player and multiplayer modes. Players can enter a single race, begin a career mode, or use a track editor to create a custom course. Three vehicle types are available—a truck, a sports car, and a formula car—though the differences between them are purely cosmetic. A mandatory split-screen display is used even in single-player mode; the second screen shows an AI opponent's view.

The career progression is structured around advancing through tiers of races, each with an entry fee. Winning a race awards prize money that can be used to purchase upgrades for the car's engine, tires, shocks, and armor. Players can also buy limited-use items like oil slicks and mines to use against opponents. To advance to a higher and more lucrative tier of races, the player must pay a significant fee, which creates a risk-versus-reward choice between upgrading a vehicle or saving to advance with an under-equipped one. The track editor is a feature inherited from Racing Destruction Set, allowing players to design, build, and save their own race courses. Courses can be straight ovals or feature complex hills and curves.

== Development ==
Silicon & Synapse was founded in February 1991 by Allen Adham, Michael Morhaime, and Frank Pearce, three recent UCLA graduates. The studio began with US$10,000 from Adham and an interest-free $10,000 loan Morhaime secured from his grandmother, for a total of $20,000 (equivalent to $47,000 in 2025) in seed money. Adham leveraged a prior working relationship with Interplay Productions founder Brian Fargo to secure contract work for the new studio, porting existing Interplay games to other platforms. For their first original project, they targeted the upcoming Super Nintendo Entertainment System console, undeterred by the fact that the technical documentation for the hardware was provided only in Japanese.

The development of RPM Racing was a pragmatic decision to mitigate the risks of developing on a new platform. Instead of creating a game from scratch, the team remade Racing Destruction Set. The core of the game, including its logic engine, AI, and track editor, was ported directly from the original. The 8-bit 65C816 assembly language code was adapted for the SNES's 16-bit system but was otherwise largely unchanged. The project was completed in a four-to-six-month sprint.

The rapid development was made possible by the Sluggo III system, a hardware ROM emulator created by Interplay programmer Rebecca Heineman. The Sluggo connects a standard IBM PC to a retail SNES console, allowing the developers to program and instantly upload the compiled files for fast testing. This eliminates the slow and costly process of burning code onto physical EPROM chips for each test iteration, dramatically accelerating the development cycle. Heineman had programmed the Atari 8-bit computer port of the predecessor Racing Destruction Set, and provided a direct continuity of technical experience for the project.

A key technical decision was the use of the SNES's high-resolution graphics mode, which has sharper detail but drastically restricts the number of on-screen colors. The resulting visual style was widely described as bland and washed-out, with sparse backgrounds and a dithering effect to simulate more colors. The chiptune soundtrack was composed by George "The Fat Man" Sanger but is considered unmemorable.

== Reception ==
Reception

Review scores
Publication	Score
Electronic Gaming Monthly	6/10, 7/10, 4/10, 4/10
Game Informer	6/10
Joystick (FR)	87%
Total!! (UK)	46%
ACE (UK)	40%

RPM Racing received mixed to poor reviews. Game Informer rated it a 6 out of 10 in its second-quarter 1992 issue. Reception in Europe was more varied; France's Joystick magazine gave it a high score of 87%, and UK-based magazines like Total!! and ACE gave it low scores of 46% and 40%, respectively. Scores from other publications include 83% from Consolemania, 75% from Joypad, 71% from N-Force, 68% from Super Action, 67% from Mean Machines, 63% from Ação Games, and 40% from Super Power.

The third issue of Game Informer has three reviews of the game with mixed results. The first reviewer gave the game a 6.25 out of 10, praising its concept as a "two-player version of R.C. Pro-Am" with "very good" graphics and a good track designer, but found it difficult to play and ultimately not entertaining. The second reviewer scored it a 6 out of 10, calling the graphics "brilliant and detailed" but the backgrounds "flatter than I expected", concluding that for players who just want to race, "this game isn't for you". The third reviewer gave the lowest score of 5.25 out of 10, describing the trucks as "very difficult to move and control" and that he "got bored with this game quickly", calling the two-player mode its only redeeming factor.

== Legacy ==
RPM Racing has a 1993 spiritual successor, Rock n' Roll Racing, which began development as a direct sequel titled RPMII, but a late-stage marketing decision by Interplay to license a hard rock soundtrack and rebrand the game transformed its identity. Rock n' Roll Racing is widely seen as the game RPM Racing should have been, as it directly addressed nearly all of the original's flaws. The Silicon & Synapse team abandoned the high-resolution graphics, opting for a lower-resolution mode that allows a much richer color palette. The gameplay was tuned to be faster and more responsive, the single-player split-screen was removed, and the experience was enhanced with a cast of charismatic characters and an energetic announcer.

In April 2021, Blizzard Entertainment added RPM Racing to the Blizzard Arcade Collection, a compilation celebrating the company's 30th anniversary. Other games in the collection, including Rock n' Roll Racing, received "Definitive Edition" updates with widescreen support, but RPM Racing was included as the original SNES version, preserving its flaws.
