= Death Knight (Warcraft) =

Character type in Warcraft

- Warcraft character class
- Concept art of a human male Death Knight player character for World of Warcraft.

Publication history
- Introduction: Warcraft II: Tides of Darkness (1995)

The Death Knight is a recurring undead character archetype and playable character class in Blizzard Entertainment's Warcraft franchise. Death Knights debuted in the 1995 real-time strategy game Warcraft II: Tides of Darkness as spellcaster units belonging to the Horde faction. Blizzard substantially reinterpreted the concept in the 2002 video game Warcraft III: Reign of Chaos, in which Death Knights are mounted warriors associated with the Undead Scourge and the fall of the paladin Arthas Menethil.

A further version became the first playable “hero class” in the massively multiplayer online role-playing game World of Warcraft, introduced with its 2008 expansion Wrath of the Lich King. This iteration combines melee combat with magical abilities and uses a resource system based on runes and runic power. Blizzard intended the Death Knight hero class to feel more immediately powerful than an ordinary newly created character while remaining balanced against the game's existing classes. The original class design allowed all three talent trees to support both tanking and damage-dealing roles, which created substantial balancing and class-identity problems. Blizzard later abandoned that structure and made one talent tree as the class's dedicated tanking specialisation.

The introductory campaign for the Death Knight class in Wrath of the Lich King was praised for integrating storytelling, environmental changes and class mechanics, and was subsequently identified as an influence on later starting areas.

== Concept and development ==
=== Origins and reinvention ===
Death Knights first appeared as late-game spellcaster units for the Horde in Warcraft II: Tides of Darkness. Blizzard designed much of the game's technology trees around broadly corresponding units, with the Human Mage serving as the Death Knight's counterpart. While the Mage and Death Knight had identical health and resource costs, their later abilities differentiated the two factions. In a retrospective published by Game Developer based on interviews with the game's developers, programmer and producer Patrick Wyatt explained that Blizzard deliberately placed greater faction asymmetry later in a match, where differences were less likely to destabilise the game's early balance.

During the development of Warcraft III, Blizzard renamed an Undead hero known as the anti-paladin as the Death Knight and removed a separate unit known by the same name. GameSpot's Greg Kasavin subsequently described the resulting hero as "essentially an anti-paladin", a mounted close-combat warrior whose abilities included Death Coil, Death Pact and Animate Dead.

=== Introduction to World of Warcraft ===
According to game director Tom Chilton, when Blizzard decided on Northrend as the setting for the next expansion of World of Warcraft, it considered the Death Knight, necromancer and runemaster as possible new classes. The Death Knight was selected because it fitted the narrative of the Lich King, the expansion's central antagonist, more closely and could increase the number of characters capable of serving as tanks. Blizzard announced the playable Death Knight at BlizzCon in August 2007 as a major feature of Wrath of the Lich King. It was described as World of Warcraft's first hero class: a class beginning at an advanced level and intended to have a more elaborate introduction than an ordinary character. Early plans required players to complete an unlocking process before creating one.

The released class began at level 55 and entered a dedicated introductory campaign rather than the starting area used by the player's chosen race. Its attacks were governed by six regenerating runes; spending those runes generated runic power, which could then be used for additional abilities. Lead producer J. Allen Brack said that Blizzard wanted the class to be capable of both tanking and inflicting damage, reducing the need for groups to depend on rigid class compositions. He distinguished the term “hero class” from greater combat power: the class was intended to look and feel exceptional while remaining equivalent to the game's other classes at comparable levels. Brack agreed that adding a class required substantially more balancing than adding a playable race.

At launch, the Death Knight class had three talent trees: Blood, Frost and Unholy. Blizzard initially allowed each tree to support either tanking or damage-dealing builds. Individual players could therefore construct substantially different tanking builds rather than being directed to a single defensive specialisation. The class received repeated balance changes during Wrath of the Lich King. Blizzard eventually concluded that maintaining three potential tanking trees diluted their identities and greatly increased the difficulty of balancing them. For the 2010 expansion Cataclysm, Blood became the dedicated tanking specialisation, while Frost and Unholy were oriented toward damage dealing.

=== Adaptation for Hearthstone ===
For the adaptation of the Death Knight into Hearthstone, the visual-effects team developed a distinct palette for the class, including frost effects differentiated from those of existing classes, blood effects and a new animation for unusable corpses. The designers also introduced corpses as a secondary resource generated when minions died. Rune restrictions prevented players from combining the strongest Blood, Frost and Unholy cards in a single deck, while the corpse system translated the class's necromantic identity into a separate gameplay mechanic.

== Depiction ==
The original Death Knights introduced in Warcraft II are spellcaster units who attack from a distance using shadow magic. They are originally slain orc magicians whose souls were placed by the orc warlock Gul'dan in the desecrated corpses of human knights during the Second War. Teron Gorefiend was the first of these Death Knights and became their leader.

The later Death Knights in Warcraft III: Reign of Chaos are depicted as mounted undead martial heroes serving the Lich King. The transformation of Arthas from a paladin into a Death Knight is an important theme for its Alliance and Undead campaigns. Unlike Gul'dan's original Death Knights, which combined the souls of slain orc magicians with human corpses, the Lich King created his champions directly. These two versions are connected through Ner’zhul, an orc shaman who had known Teron Gorefiend before he was transformed into the Lich King by the events of Warcraft III.

In World of Warcraft: The Burning Crusade, Gorefiend returns during a quest line in Shadowmoon Valley. Posing as an imprisoned spirit, he persuades the player character to recover his cloak, truncheon, and armor. Once the relics are returned, Gorefiend reveals his identity, possesses the player character, and uses their body to kill the draenei paladin guarding his prison before escaping. He later appears as a raid boss in the Black Temple, where he is ultimately defeated and destroyed by adventurers.

In Wrath of the Lich King, a newly created Death Knight begins at level 55 as a fallen champion compelled to serve the Lich King. Its dedicated introductory campaign teaches the class by awarding equipment, abilities, talent points and a mount while requiring the player to attack the Scarlet Enclave and participate in atrocities, including confronting a person connected to the character's former life. The campaign culminates at Light's Hope Chapel, where the Death Knights break free of the Lich King's control and form the Knights of the Ebon Blade before the player character rejoins the Horde or Alliance. Following the Lich King's defeat, the Ebon Blade's original purpose of obtaining revenge was fulfilled. Its surviving members attempt to reintegrate into their previous factions while remaining separated from their former lives due to their undead nature.

Death Knights have appeared in licensed fiction and other games derived from the Warcraft franchise. The 2009 manga World of Warcraft: Death Knight, written by Dan Jolley and illustrated by Rocio Zucchi, centres on Thassarian, a character introduced in Wrath of the Lich King. It depicts his transformation into a Death Knight.

A playable Death Knight class was added to Blizzard's digital card game Hearthstone in the 2022 expansion March of the Lich King. It was the game's second class added after launch, following Demon Hunter. Its cards were divided among Blood, Frost and Unholy rune categories, adapting the specialisation identities used in World of Warcraft into deck-building restrictions.

== Critical reception ==
Contemporary coverage treated the Death Knight as one of the expansion's principal attractions. Before release, Earnest Cavalli of Wired called it the expansion's “most heralded addition” and highlighted the combination of an advanced starting level, a dedicated introduction and abilities drawn from several conventional character roles. Scott F. Andrews of Blizzard Watch described the Death Knight's talent tree system as one of Blizzard's most ambitious class-design experiments, but argued that its breadth made the class excessively versatile and left all three trees without sufficiently distinct identities. Torres considered the class mechanically distinctive but questioned whether its apparent power and flexibility could disrupt fundamental aspects of the game.

The starting campaign received particularly strong praise. Zach Yonzon of Engadget described it as the most immersive role-playing experience then available in World of Warcraft. He praised its gradual environmental changes, music, spectacle and integration of the player's abilities into the narrative. Yonzon also noted the contrast between the character's early participation in atrocities and the eventual rejection of the Lich King. Cody Bye of Ten Ton Hammer similarly praised the introductory campaign, the class's visual presentation and the immediate sense of power created by its self-healing and offensive abilities. He considered it one of the game's most entertaining classes but criticised the abrupt return to older The Burning Crusade areas after the bespoke introduction, as well as a bug preventing some players from seeing the final climactic quest at launch.

Zach Yonzon of Engadget praised the manga as a self-contained account of Thassarian’s life that added depth to a comparatively underdeveloped in-game character without changing the game’s major events.

Later coverage continued to evaluate how effectively Blizzard preserved the class's identity. In 2024, Fraser Brown of PC Gamer praised the Rider of the Apocalypse hero talents introduced in The War Within for emphasizing the Death Knight's mounted-warrior identity through combat from a deathcharger and the summoning of the Four Horsemen.

=== Influence and analysis ===
The starting campaign for the Death Knight class made extensive use of phasing, a technology that allowed the same physical location to appear differently to players according to their progress. Buildings, characters and battlefield conditions changed as quests were completed, giving the impression that the player was affecting the surrounding world without moving into a conventional private instance. Yonzon argued that the technology gave the campaign a greater sense of consequence than earlier quest areas. Mike Fahey of Kotaku later identified the Death Knight starting area as the standard against which the Goblin and Worgen starting experiences in Cataclysm were developed. He credited it with introducing a more prominent narrative role for newly created characters, environmental phasing and mini-games into Blizzard's starting-zone design.

The progression of the Wrath of the Lich King campaign for Death Knight player characters, in which players are forced to perform violent actions before their characters are permitted to renounce the Lich King, attracted commentary. Andrews reported that some players objected to having no meaningful alternative to completing those quests, especially when confronting characters connected to the player character's former life. Sociologist William Sims Bainbridge examined this conflict in his book The Warcraft Civilization. While playing an undead Death Knight named Annihila, Bainbridge attempted to refuse an order to execute a prisoner from the character's past and then tried to leave the starting area. Progress was impossible without completing the prescribed campaign. Bainbridge used the episode to discuss the difference between apparent moral choice in a virtual world and the limited actions permitted by its designers.

Philosopher Luke Cuddy examined the relationship between the Death Knight and its player in a section titled “Death Knight as Overman?” in World of Warcraft and Philosophy. Cuddy used a maximum-level Death Knight as his example of constructing an avatar as a work of art. He argued that this could affirm a player’s in-game identity, but would not resemble Nietzsche’s Overman if it displaced self-creation in the player’s life outside the game.
