= Racing Destruction Set =

1985 video game

- Developers: Electronic Arts; Atari 8-bit Interplay Productions
- Publishers: NA: Electronic Arts; EU: Ariolasoft
- Designers: Rick Koenig; Connie Goldman; David Warhol
- Programmers: Commodore 64; Rick Koenig; Atari 8-bit Rebecca Heineman
- Artist: Connie Goldman
- Composer: David Warhol
- Series: Construction Set
- Platforms: Commodore 64, Atari 8-bit
- Release: C64: NA: April 1985; UK: August 1985; Atari 8-bit: NA/EU: May 1986
- Genre: Racing
- Modes: Single-player, multiplayer

Racing Destruction Set is a 1985 racing video game developed and published by Electronic Arts for the Commodore 64. It was advertised as being Commodore 128 compatible. A version for Atari 8-bit computers, programmed by Rebecca Heineman of Interplay, was released in 1986 in the United States, United Kingdom, and Germany. The game allows players to design and race on tracks with a variety of vehicles. It is part of the Construction Set series along with Pinball Construction Set, Music Construction Set, and Adventure Construction Set.

== Gameplay ==
Gameplay screenshot (Atari 8-bit)

The game is a one or two-player game played with joysticks.

The player can create different race tracks using a variety of templates. The player can create ramps and elevation changes in the layout of the track as well. The builder also has the options to change the type of terrain - laying slippery ice stretches of track, normal track, or difficult sandy sections of track.

For a particular race, the player can change a variety of features. The player can alter the gravity to reflect gravity on different planets or the moon. The player has the option of changing which vehicle they want to race in and make customized changes to the tires, engine and other aspects of the vehicle. The vehicles available are a Can-Am sports car, a Jeep, a lunar rover, a dirt bike, a baja buggy, a pickup, a Chevrolet Corvette C2 Stingray, a stock car, a street bike, and an Indy/GP car.

The racing uses split-screen. Player 1 controls the red car on the top screen, and player 2 controls the yellow car on the bottom screen. The races have an option for racing mode or destruction mode. In racing mode, a number of laps are chosen and the quickest to complete them is the winner. In destruction mode, each player has access to oil slicks and landmines which can be ejected from the back of the vehicles.

== Development ==
The game was written by Rick Koenig, with art by Connie Goldman and music by David Warhol. Koenig, Goldman and Warhol had all worked for the Intellivision game design team at Mattel during the early 1980s, where Koenig had programmed the Intellivision Motocross game. When Intellivision Director of Game Development Don Daglow left Mattel and joined Electronic Arts as a Producer in late 1983, he reunited Koenig, Goldman and Warhol on Racing Destruction Set at EA.

Racing Destruction Set was supplied on either floppy disk or two double-sided cassette tapes. Side 1 of the cassette had the game files and sides 2, 3, and 4 had track files. The cassette conversion of this game was done by Ariolasoft.

== Port ==
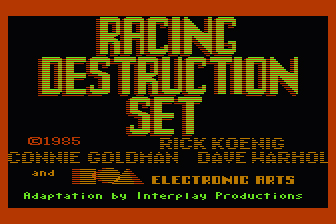
Atari 8-bit conversion credited to Interplay Productions

A port to Atari 8-bit computers was coded in 1985 by Rebecca Heineman of Interplay Entertainment and published in 1986 in the United States by Electronic Arts and in Europe by Ariolasoft.

== Reception ==
Racing Destruction Set was Electronic Arts' third best-selling Commodore game as of late 1987. In the UK, issue 6 of Zzap!64 magazine awarded the game a "Sizzler", giving it a rating of 95%.

== Legacy ==
In 1991, RDS was remade on the Super NES and released as RPM Racing. This was followed up by Rock N' Roll Racing, also on the SNES, in 1993.

== See also ==
- Fast Tracks: The Computer Slot Car Construction Kit, similar concept from Activision
- Rally Speedway, racing game with track editor
