= Pax Imperia =

1992 video game

- Developer: Changeling Software
- Publisher: Changeling Software
- Designers: Andrew and Peter Sispoidis
- Platform: Apple Macintosh
- Release: 1992
- Genre: Turn-based strategy or Real-time strategy (user selectable)
- Mode: Single player or Multiplayer

Pax Imperia is a 4X game for the Apple Macintosh, released in 1992. The game won praise for its complex gameplay, real-time mode and ability for up to 16 players to join a single game using AppleTalk.

Pax Imperia: Eminent Domain was released in 1997 as a sequel, for both the Mac and PC.

Pax Imperia is a Latin term, meaning "peace of the empires".

== Gameplay ==
The Pax Imperia Universe window, at the start of a game. The player has started with their home world in Cygnus, the star with the crown. In the Beginner skill level, the player also starts with several ships, visible in the system.

Like most 4X games, Pax Imperia's basic gameplay involved building spaceships and flying to other worlds in order to take them over. Once captured, the worlds could be upgraded to provide materials, ships, and improve their defensive capabilities. Unlike most other 4X games, Pax had much more complex solar systems, including moving planets, their moons, and a habitable temperature zone that varied depending on the star and the race's preferences.

Races could be customized by players at the start of the game. Options included which atmosphere type they breathed (oxygen, nitrogen, carbon, or hydrogen), temperature range and tolerance, and four percentile-rated attributes: curiosity, efficiency, reproduction, and aggression. These attributes impacted the race's rate of scientific discoveries, building speed, population growth, and on-planet combat effectiveness, respectively.

Larger planets and moons had multiple "territories" in the higher skill level settings. Territories had a natural population limit based on their ecological fitness for the player's species. As the population grew and started to reach the maximum for any one territory, they would naturally migrate out of a territory into surrounding ones. Over time a single colonization attempt would take over an entire planet. This also allowed a player to take over a single territory on an enemy-colonized planet and attempt to build it up. As the population of that territory rose, the inhabitants would naturally try to emigrate to surrounding territories, fighting "migration wars" if they were already inhabited by the enemy player.

The economy in Pax was based on the mining of five commodities, and the taxation of the population. Taxation only occurred on territories that were not colonies; the conversion from colony to taxable "home planet" occurred when the user built a spaceship port in the territory. Each type of infrastructure required a minimum population to be operated - ports required 2,500 people for instance. Adding infrastructure thus increased the maximum population in the territory, and the tax base. The "city" infrastructure was used solely to build up the population, adding 5,000 people to the maximum.

In most 4X games, the space between systems did not exist - ships could fly only from system to system and combat takes place only within them. This was not true in Pax, where ships could be flown to any point on the game map. The flexible design allowed for a number of different strategies. For instance, inexpensive spy ships consisting of sensors and little else could be left in the outskirts of enemy solar systems to allow the player to examine what was going on in that system. On the other end of the spectrum, ships equipped only with shields and weapons, and no drive, could be used as defensive satellites.

Pax included design systems for both ships and the technologies that would be installed on them. The ship design was based around a fixed selection of "hulls" which differed primarily in mass, materials cost and the number of attachment points for technologies. The technology design system was quite complex, allowing the player to select tradeoffs on range/power of the weapons, speed/cost of the engines and so forth. Players could design the technologies, and then attach those technologies to one of the ship classes. Alternately they could leave the tech design to the computer, which would generate new technologies over time, and then manually select those technologies to design ships. In the extreme, all of this could be left to the computer, which would periodically generate new ship classes automatically.

== Development ==
Pax Imperia was released for Mac computers on December 21, 1992.

== Reception ==
Reception

Review scores
Publication	Score
Computer Gaming World	4/5
Dragon	4/5

The game was reviewed in 1993 in Dragon #196 by Hartley, Patricia, and Kirk Lesser in "The Role of Computers" column. The reviewers gave the game 4 out of 5 stars. Computer Gaming World stated in August 1993 that Pax Imperia innovated on previous 4X games like Reach for the Stars and Spaceward Ho!. While calling it "a work in progress", the magazine concluded that "the quality of Pax Imperia more than outweighs its blemishes ... a pleasing and challenging addition to its genre". A 1994 survey of strategic space games set in the year 2000 and later gave the game four stars out of five, stating that it "rivals Reach for the Stars in scope". The magazine praised its detail but wished for faster play and "a good tutorial".

In 1994, Pax Imperia was inducted into Macworld's 1993 Game Hall of Fame in the "Best Strategy Game" category. Macworld called it "lavishly presented" and "a superb exploitation of the Mac interface", concluding that it is "a space odyssey with truly operatic grandeur." It was also noted for its "absurd complexity".
