= Pax Imperia: Eminent Domain =

1997 video game

- Developer: Heliotrope Studios
- Publishers: Atari, THQ
- Platforms: Windows, Apple Macintosh
- Release: Windows: NA: November 3, 1997; EU: 1997; Macintosh: NA: 1998
- Genres: 4X, RTS
- Modes: Single-player, multiplayer

Pax Imperia: Eminent Domain is a real-time strategy video game. The game emphasizes empire building and customization. Pax Imperia is a Latin term, meaning "peace from empire". It is the sequel to the 1992 video game Pax Imperia.

== Gameplay ==
Instead of using a single large map as do most real-time strategy games, the game revolves around star systems connected by wormholes or jump points, which connect a system of star systems in a large web. The game allows the player to customise the species that they are to play to a high degree. Players can focus on construction, reproduction, research, espionage, or the acquisition of money. Players can select special qualities, such as having psychic powers or an aquatic physiology, and can tailor their species to be better at peaceful colonisation or conquest. Finally, the player can customise a galaxy size and characteristics, customise a race of species and customise a ship of original design.

Different planets have different types of atmosphere, so that certain species can more easily colonise some than others, and each planet has different quantities of natural resources, similar to the Space Empires series of games.

Unlike the Master of Orion series of games, Pax Imperia: Eminent Domain is not a turn based strategy game, but is instead real time. The game speed can be adjusted during the game, to speed up moments and slow down important parts in which a lot of interaction is needed.

== Development ==
In 1995, Blizzard Entertainment, in association with Changeling Software, announced the development of the sequel to Pax Imperia, Pax Imperia 2, for release upon both the Macintosh and PC platforms for Christmas 1995. The release date was later pushed back to March 1996.

In August 1996, Blizzard Entertainment announced the sale of the game rights to THQ, and Heliotrope Studios continued to finish its development. Discussing the decision to cancel Blizzard's involvement with the project, Blizzard's Allen Adham said in 1996:

"Since we're a small company, we don't have the resources to generate a dozen titles a year, and because of that, we're not prepared to release a title that's not an A+ title[. ...] We spent a lot of time going over Pax Imperia II, and even though it's a cool concept and has lots of potential, we just didn't feel it was progressing as well or as quickly as we'd hoped."

In 1997, Pax Imperia 2 was released under the name of Pax Imperia: Eminent Domain, exclusively on the PC and Macintosh platforms.

== Reception ==
Reception

Review scores
Publication	Score	
Publication	Macintosh	PC
AllGame	1.5/5	3.5/5
Computer Games Strategy Plus	N/A	2.5/5
Computer Gaming World	N/A	2.5/5
Edge	N/A	6/10
Game Informer	N/A	7.75/10
GameSpot	N/A	6.5/10
MacLife	"Spiffy"	N/A
Macworld	2/5	N/A
Next Generation	N/A	2/5
PC Gamer (US)	N/A	60%

The game received mixed reviews. Next Generation said, "The original Pax Imperia offered complexity and elegance, but this one is too arbitrary and confusing." In a negative review, Macworld's Michael Gowan wrote, "This space-age strategy game tries to turn a slow-moving genre into a real-time experience, but lackluster graphics and long waits cause it to fall flat."
