= The Lost Vikings 2 =

1997 video game

Lost Vikings 2
- North American SNES box art
- Developers: Blizzard Entertainment (SNES); Beam Software (Saturn, PS, Windows)
- Publisher: Interplay Productions
- Producer: Feargus Urquhart
- Designer: Ron Millar
- Programmer: James Phinney
- Artist: Samwise Didier
- Composer: Glenn Stafford
- Platforms: Super NES, Sega Saturn, MS-DOS, Windows, PlayStation, Nintendo Switch, PlayStation 4, Xbox One
- Release: May 1997: Super NES; EU: 1997; NA: May 1997 Saturn; NA: 1997; EU: May 26, 1997 MS-DOS, Windows; NA: April 30, 1997; EU: 1997 PlayStation; EU: May 1997; NA: November 17, 1997 Windows, Switch, PlayStation 4, Xbox One; WW: April 13, 2021
- Genre: Puzzle-platform
- Modes: Single-player, multiplayer

Lost Vikings 2 is a 1997 puzzle-platform game developed by Blizzard Entertainment and Beam Software, and published by Interplay. All versions of the game, except the SNES release, were titled Lost Vikings 2: Norse by Norsewest (Norse by Norse West: The Return of The Lost Vikings in the U.S.). The sequel to The Lost Vikings, it features the original three Viking characters plus two new playable characters: Fang the werewolf and Scorch the dragon. The gameplay remains largely the same, though the three Viking characters all have new or modified abilities.

The releases for MS-DOS, Microsoft Windows, PlayStation, and Saturn feature pre-rendered 3D graphics, CD music and extensive voice acting provided by Rob Paulsen (Erik), Jeff Bennett (Baleog and Fang), Jim Cummings (Olaf, Tomator), Frank Welker (Scorch), Tress MacNeille, and Kath Soucie.

The SNES version by Blizzard Entertainment, which was developed in 1995 but kept shelved until 1997 so it could be released together with the next generation versions by Beam Software, is the original version of the game and continued the use of the more cartoony graphics style seen in the first game. It is also the last Blizzard development on the SNES console.

In celebration of the company's 30th anniversary, the SNES version of The Lost Vikings 2 was re-released for Microsoft Windows, Nintendo Switch, PlayStation 4 and Xbox One as part of the Blizzard Arcade Collection on April 13, 2021.

== Plot ==
After escaping from the alien Tomator in The Lost Vikings, Erik the Swift, Olaf the Stout, and Baleog the Fierce lived joyous and fruitful Viking lives. Then one day, while returning home from a fishing trip, the Vikings are captured by Tomator again and warped to his lair. Tomator then calls upon a robotic guard to send them into the Arena, but during the alien's celebration of capturing the Vikings, he causes a system failure and a blackout. Before the lights come back on, the three Vikings ambush and dismantle the robot, wearing its parts as armor which grants them new abilities. Before the trio can plan a proper escape, Olaf accidentally pulls a lever on a time machine, sending the three Vikings through time once again. Equipped with new robotic gear, Erik, Olaf, and Baleog must journey through different time periods to find their way back home. Along the way, the Vikings befriend a werewolf named Fang (who is constantly mistaken for other animals by them) and a dragon named Scorch, both of whom assist them in their quest.

The Vikings are first sent to Transylvania (1437 A.D.), and make it their mission to relocate the time machine in order to be sent back to their ship. However, due to the time machine misinterpreting their banter, they are always warped to another time period instead upon finding it. After finding the time machine in Transylvania, the Vikings are sent to the Dark Ages (700 A.D.), then a pirate ship in "Smugglers Cove" (1789), and the Amazon Jungle (200 B.C.), before arriving at the final location of the adventure: a post-apocalyptic setting where Tomator has confiscated the time machine.

Once the group defeats Tomator, he is revealed to be Tommy, a bratty child that inconspicuously appeared in previous locations of the game. He explains that the entire journey was set up by him disrupting the fabric of time and space as something to keep him more entertained than video games. His parents then appear as voices, scolding him for this action before sending the Vikings back to their ship along with Fang and Scorch.

== Gameplay ==
Lost Vikings 2 is a side-scrolling platform adventure in which the player alternates control of three of the five playable characters, guiding each of them one at a time from a designated start point in each level to the exit, collecting three specific items along the way. The game predetermines which characters are available in any specific level. Control may be swapped from character to character at any point. In the two-player cooperative mode, each player simultaneously controls one character and is allowed to change control to the third, unused character at any point. Every level is designed such that each character must contribute his unique skills to help the other two through to the end. Similarly, to finish the level, all three characters must reach the exit point with the three items in possession. The characters each have three health points which they can lose by getting hurt by enemies or by falling from great heights. Should any character run out of health points, he dies; gameplay will then continue with any remaining characters, but the level becomes unwinnable, and the player will eventually have to restart the level and try again (the game offers unlimited continues).

Each character has the ability to carry and use items — mainly keys, bombs, and food (which restore health points) — as well as a unique set of skills:

- Erik now has turbo boots which allow him to jump much higher than before and can smash certain overhead walls with his turbo jump. The helmet also allows him to swim.
- Baleog has a bionic arm which can smash enemies from a distance. The range is somewhat limited compared to his arrows from the first game, but the bionic arm also allows Baleog to swing in the air using special hooks and to grab some items inaccessible to others.
- Olaf can release a fart that propels him upward, giving him limited aerial range as well as the power to destroy certain floors. In addition to his hang-gliding abilities, he can also shrink and squeeze through tiny gaps.
- Fang can jump, climb walls by clinging to them with his claws, and slash enemies from close range.
- Scorch has a fireball attack which damages enemies and can trigger certain switches. He can also fly until he gets exhausted, at which point he can glide softly down, like Olaf.

== Release ==
A 3DO Interactive Multiplayer version of The Lost Vikings 2 was announced to be in development and slated to be published by Interplay during E3 1995. This version was never released.

== Reception ==
Reception

Review scores
Publication	Score
Electronic Gaming Monthly	7.375/10 (SAT); 7.625/10 (SNES)
GameSpot	8.4/10 (PS1); 8.3/10 (PC)
Next Generation	3/5 (SAT)
PC PowerPlay	72% (PC)
Sega Saturn Magazine	89% (SAT)

The Saturn and PlayStation versions were met with generally positive reviews. While most critics remarked that the graphics are subpar for their generation, they praised the humorous voice clips and, while noting that the challenge level is extremely high and would be frustrating for some players, they also felt it to be entirely fair and intellectually stimulating. For instance, Dan Hsu of Electronic Gaming Monthly opined that having to start levels over if even one of the Vikings dies is "unforgiving, but necessary", and his co-reviewer Crispin Boyer remarked, "The later levels are especially tough, but they're also rewarding if you can figure them out (don't be a quitter!)." Next Generation said the game had retained the original's strong puzzles: "The levels are still nicely designed and have a reasonable learning curve." GamePro was less certain, remarking that though the gameplay and puzzles are deep and fun, they could not wholly recommend the game due to its graphical mediocrity. Trent Ward of GameSpot, however, disagreed with the majority assessment of the graphics, stating that "Although it's no visual feast, Norse by NorseWest still looks pretty good for what is, at its heart, a puzzle game." Lee Nutter of Sega Saturn Magazine called the game "excellent fodder for platform/puzzle enthusiasts, with plenty of lastability."

The four reviewers of EGM noted that the only difference between the SNES version and the earlier Saturn and PlayStation versions are the graphics and the lack of voices, leaving the gameplay and personality intact. They commented that this means SNES loyalists lose nothing important by getting the game for SNES instead of a current generation console, but also that those who had already bought the game for another system had no reason to get it again, since the puzzles are all the same and can only be completed in one way. GamePro was dissatisfied with the graphics and sound effects, saying they are unimproved from the original The Lost Vikings and thus don't hold up to SNES games released in recent years. However, the reviewer praised the implementation of the characters' abilities and the humor.
