= World of Warcraft: Wrath of the Lich King =

2008 expansion set for World of Warcraft

- Developer: Blizzard Entertainment
- Publisher: Blizzard Entertainment
- Designers: Tom Chilton, Jeff Kaplan
- Composers: Russell Brower, Derek Duke, Glenn Stafford
- Series: Warcraft
- Platforms: Microsoft Windows, OS X
- Release: EU/NA: November 13, 2008; AU: November 14, 2008
- Genre: MMORPG
- Mode: Multiplayer

World of Warcraft: Wrath of the Lich King is the second expansion set for the massively multiplayer online role-playing game (MMORPG) World of Warcraft, following The Burning Crusade. It launched on November 13, 2008 and sold 2.8 million copies within the first day, making it the fastest selling computer game of all time released at that point. The game added a substantial amount of new content to the game world, including the new continent of Northrend, home of The Lich King Arthas and his undead minions. In order to advance through Northrend, players were required to reach at least level 68, with the level cap for the expansion being 80. The first hero class was introduced, the Death Knight, that starts at level 55.

== Gameplay ==
=== Level increase ===
The first expansion pack, World of Warcraft: The Burning Crusade, raised the maximum level from 60 to 70 and the Wrath of the Lich King raised the level cap from 70 to 80.

After reaching level 80, players were able to ride flying mounts in Northrend. Eastern Kingdoms and Kalimdor remained "no fly zones".

=== Death Knights ===
The death knight is the first "hero class" introduced in World of Warcraft, and would be the only one available until the introduction of the demon hunter in Legion. Hero classes are those that start the game at a higher level than the regular level 1. Originally, a death knight could only be created if the player previously had a level 55 on that realm but that requirement was removed in late 2014.

Death knights are fallen heroes of the Alliance and the Horde, raised by the Lich King to serve as champions of the undead Scourge. They are able to fill the tank and damage dealer roles. The three death knight specializations are blood, frost and unholy. The blood specialization focuses on the manipulation of blood, using an enemy's blood against them while using the death knights' blood to benefit themselves. Frost specializes in control, counters and combination strikes using frost related abilities. Unholy specialization focuses on poisoning your opponent and sending the player's permanent, controllable pet ghoul to attack the enemy. Death knights wear plate armor and wield weapons with rune engravings (permanent weapon enhancements), which are achieved through the death knight profession called runeforging by utilizing the runeforge in Acherus.

Newly created death knights begin with a larger set of spells and abilities than new characters of other classes. The class starts without any talent points and must unlock available talent tiers for their level by completing quests in the death knight starting area in Eastern Plaguelands. Players must complete all the starting area quests in order to join the rest of Azeroth. The death knight class is available to all in-game races.

Instead of utilizing rage, energy or mana for combat resources, a death knight uses a system of runes and runic power (both displayed under the player portrait), which is generated by using runes. The death knight originally had two of each type of rune - blood, frost and unholy - available for use. After a rune is used, it enters a ten-second 'cooldown' period before it can be used again and runic power decays over time when out of combat. With specific talents, the death knight can also turn their runes into death runes, which can be used as any type of rune. The death knight has the option of three presences: blood, frost and unholy. In Wrath of the Lich King, frost presence increased threat generated, increased health and lowered damage taken; blood presence increased damage done and restored a portion of damage dealt as healing; unholy presence increased attack speed, increased movement speed and reduced the global cooldown on all abilities.

In the following expansion, Cataclysm, with a desire to clearly designate specializations as damage dealing or tank, Blood became the designated tanking spec and blood presence's effects were changed so that blood presence had threat and damage mitigation and frost presence was changed to increasing all runic power generation. In the Legion expansion, death knights have six death runes instead of three types of runes and presences were removed; each specific presence's effect is included in its related specialization automatically.

=== Northrend ===
Northrend is a crescent-shaped continent in northern Azeroth. The continent is roughly half the size of the Eastern Kingdoms, but matches Outland in length and width. Although Northrend is known for its snow and ice, only parts of the continent are frozen over. Northrend features eight zones with content designed for players beginning at level 68, although players may travel to Northrend at any level. Players arrive by boat (Alliance) or zeppelin (Horde) either at the Howling Fjord or the Borean Tundra zones, each located at opposite ends of the continent. Howling Fjord is home to evil half-giants called the Vrykul, who reside in Utgarde Keep, the first dungeon in the expansion. The Dragonblight and Grizzly Hills zones are located in the south-central and southeast parts of the continent respectively. The Ursine Furbolgs reside in the forested Grizzly Hills. Dragonblight features the gravesites of dragons who came to the region to die. Wintergrasp is the first zone in World of Warcraft designed specifically for Player versus Player (PVP) activities, even on Player versus Environment (PvE) servers.

The forces of the Alliance, unified under King Varian Wrynn, have brought its armies to Northrend with the goal of avenging the Alliance Kingdom of Lordaeron, whose betrayal and destruction at the hands of Prince Arthas Menethil was engineered by the Lich King. The Alliance controls Valiance Keep and Valgarde in the Borean Tundra and Howling Fjord respectively, as well as Wintergarde Keep in Dragonblight.

The Forsaken and their Banshee Queen, Sylvanas Windrunner, have also arrived with a new contagion that they hope will prove to be effective against the undead minions of the Lich King. The Forsaken are seeking vengeance for being subjected to Arthas's magic. They have set up a military base of operations called "Vengeance Landing" and have created a settlement called "New Agamand," both in the Howling Fjord. The magi of Dalaran have also relocated, along with their city, to Northrend in order to deal with the rising threat of the Blue Dragonflight, led by Malygos the Spell-Weaver, and the Lich King. The city of Dalaran functions as the neutral sanctuary city for the continent, analogous to Shattrath City in Outland. Dalaran is levitating at a great height above the Crystalsong Forest zone but can be accessed by either the ground or by flying mount. The expansion also features more creatures and other enemies, such as the four new spirit beasts: Loque'nahak, Gondria, Skoll and Arcturis. It also introduces the vicious dragons called Proto-Drakes (dragons with short arms, huge teeth and large wings) and the gigantic dinosaur named King Krush, who stalks the jungles of Sholazar Basin. Arthas Menethil, the Lich King, is the primary antagonist of the expansion.

== Plot ==
In the wake of the Sunwell's purification, a period of suspicious silence swept over the world. As if on cue, the undead Scourge launched a massive assault against the cities and towns of Azeroth, this time extending its reach far beyond the Eastern Kingdoms. Under pressure to respond with a full army, Warchief Thrall deployed an expedition force to Northrend led by Overlord Garrosh Hellscream. Meanwhile, the missing human king Varian Wrynn at last returned to Stormwind City and reclaimed his crown. He sent an equally powerful Alliance army, commanded by Bolvar Fordragon, to defeat the Lich King—and any Horde forces who would stand in their way.

The Alliance and Horde (led by Dranosh Saurfang) eventually led a combined offensive on the Wrathgate, the entrance to the Lich King's fortress of Icecrown Citadel. Before they could succeed, however, Grand Apothecary Putress and his Royal Apothecary Society followers (renegade Forsaken) unleashed a new plague that killed friend and foe alike, while his traitorous counterpart, the dreadlord Varimathras, seized the Undercity in a coup that nearly killed Sylvanas. The usurpers were slain for their vile deeds by armies of the Alliance and Horde and the Forsaken capital was restored. The debacle, however, created suspicion among the Horde regarding Sylvanas's loyalties. At the Wrathgate, many brave Alliance soldiers died at the hands of the Forsaken's Royal Apothecary Society; including King Varian's dear friend Bolvar Fordragon. Varian, who had always been wary of the orcs, discovered that the Royal Apothecary Society had been developing the new plague for years. The events that transpired during the battle for the Undercity convinced the human king that the Horde had been left unchecked for too long and he becomes hostile to the Horde for the rest of the campaign in Northrend.

In order to diminish the leadership of the Scourge, forces of Azeroth take on the newly rebuilt necropolis Naxxramas that floats in the eastern portion of the Dragonblight region. Much like its predecessor in the Eastern Plaguelands of the Eastern Kingdoms, battles wage all throughout the dread citadel, before taking the fight to Kel'Thuzad himself and putting an end to his and the Lich King's partnership once and for all. At the same time, Malygos, Aspect of the Blue Dragonflight, has been twisted and gone mad, convinced the mortal magic wielders are tainting Azeroth and begins a campaign to purge them. Hidden in the void of the Eye of Eternity, he channels leylines of arcane magic to fuel his army and empower his abilities. At the saddened behest of his sister, Alextrasza, Queen of the Dragons and Aspect of the Red Dragonflight, champions of Azeroth end his crusade and pave the way for a brighter future for the Blue Flight.

=== Secrets of Ulduar ===
The march of Horde and Alliance armies through Northrend led to a number of victories, but these successes paled before a discovery made by the explorer Brann Bronzebeard within the ancient titan complex of Ulduar. This mysterious fortress had long served as the prison of the Old God Yogg-Saron, a being of unfathomable evil whose influence had spread into the continent of Northrend itself. However, the safeguards keeping Yogg-Saron imprisoned began to fail, and the Old God's influence corrupted Ulduar's guardians. With Brann's assistance, small bands of Alliance and Horde champions infiltrated Ulduar to confront Yogg-Saron, who blasted the invaders with cryptic visions: the millennia-old creation of an artifact known as the Dragon Soul, the assassination of Stormwind's King Llane, and a glimpse of the Lich King's future. However, the heroes manage to prevail and destroy Yogg-Saron.

=== Call of the Crusade ===
In preparation for the final offensive against the Lich King, the Argent Crusade (a union of holy warriors from the Order of the Silver Hand and the Argent Dawn) assembled a base near Icecrown Citadel to gather resources and identify the champions who would serve at the vanguard of their army. Highlord Tirion Fordring organized a tournament to test potential heroes of the Horde and the Alliance, but agents of the Scourge quickly emerged to sabotage the event. The undead attack culminated with the appearance of the monstrous crypt lord Anub'arak, who attempted to exterminate Tirion's elite force before it could be assembled. Fortunately, the gathered heroes prove to be too much for Anub'arak to handle and he is defeated.

=== Fall of the Lich King ===
As the final battle against the Lich King approached, the human sorceress Jaina Proudmoore and the Banshee Queen Sylvanas Windrunner journeyed to the icy heart of Northrend. Both had come for different reasons: Jaina hoped to discover whether a part of her former friend and lover, Arthas Menethil, still lived; Sylvanas longed to take revenge on her old enemy. With the aid of these two heroes, Azeroth's champions stormed Icecrown Citadel and vanquished the Lich King's minions. Their confrontation with the Lich King involved thousands of souls consumed by Arthas's blade, Frostmourne. Ultimately, Arthas was slain with the aid of Tirion Fordring, and the heroes who triumphed over him learned a chilling truth about the existence of the undead Scourge. Without a Lich King, the leaderless undead would go on an unstoppable rampage across Azeroth. Bolvar (revealed to have been altered by the red dragons' flame), steps forward and voluntarily becomes the new Lich King, promising to keep the Scourge contained in Northrend as its eternal jailer.

After the Lich King's defeat, the champions of Azeroth now have to face a new threat in form of the Twilight dragon Halion. Halion, the herald of Deathwing, has assembled a war party of Black dragons and attacked the Ruby Dragonflight sanctum in Wyrmrest Temple, in order to facilitate Deathwing's re-emergence into Azeroth and the adventurers must stop him.

== Development and release ==
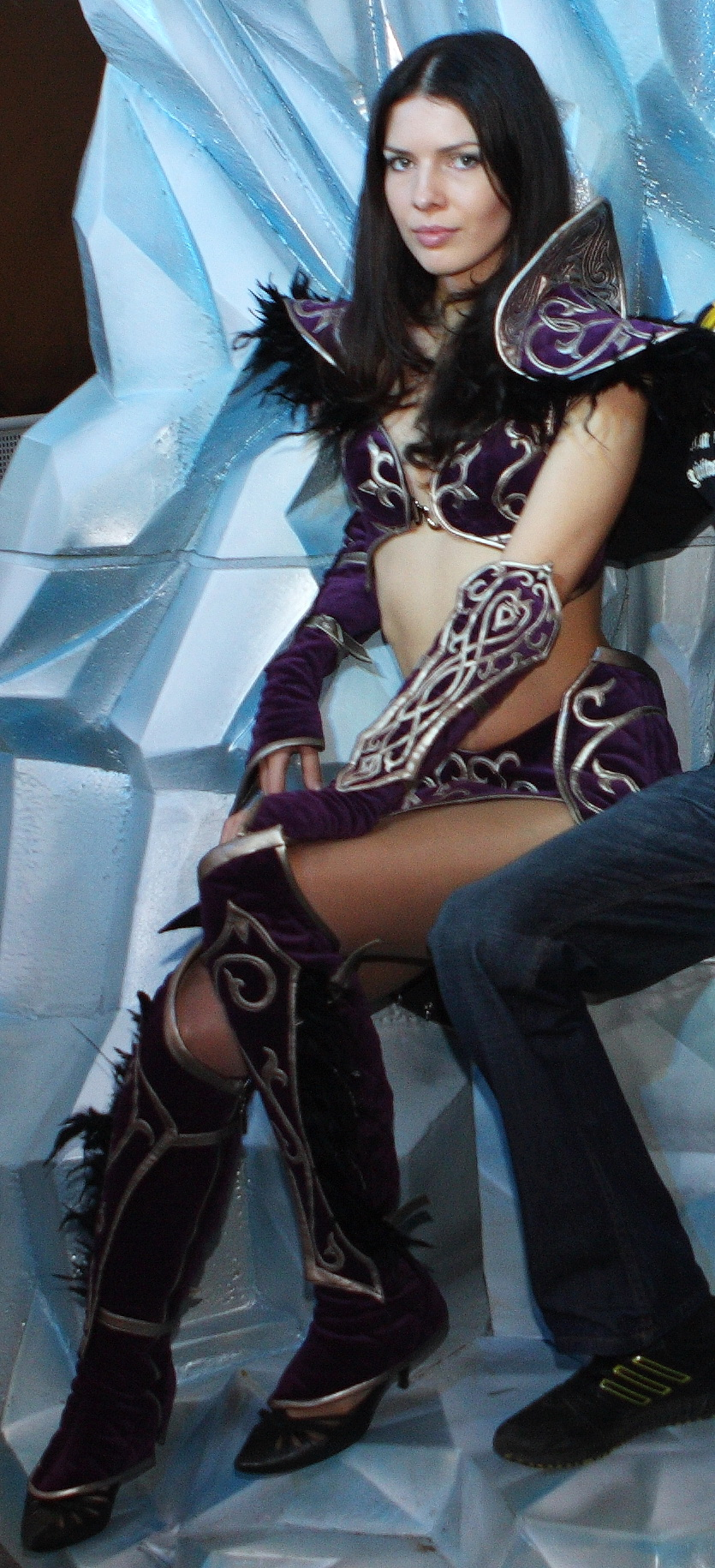
Promotion at IgroMir 2012

World of Warcraft: Wrath of the Lich King was announced on August 3, 2007, on the first day of BlizzCon 2007. Several enhancements to World of Warcraft's graphics engine were added with the release of Wrath of the Lich King. These include the use of a new shader in areas containing ice, new fire effects, more realistic shadows, and the option to turn down character texture resolution to improve performance.

On October 15, 2008, Patch 3.0.2, titled 'Wrath of the Lich King', was released to pave the way for the upcoming expansion, bringing many of the expansion's updated systems to the game pre-release. Several new features were added including an all new class called the Death Knight. Classes received new spells and abilities. A harbor was added to Stormwind and new Zeppelin towers outside Orgrimmar and Tirisfal Glades. Wrath of the Lich King was released on November 13, 2008.

The release of the expansion in China was delayed by eighteen months. Prior to release, the Ministry of Culture required visual design changes, including replacing undead creatures with living ones, removing imagery of skulls and skeletons, and changing the color of blood to green.

Patch 3.1.0, 'Secrets of Ulduar', was released April 15, 2009. Players discovered the titan city of Ulduar to learn it was a prison keeping the Old God of Death, Yogg-Saron inside. New content along with the new raid, Ulduar, was added including the new Argent Tournament Grounds. The dual talent specialization and the equipment manager were added to the UI. Patch 3.2, 'Call of the Crusade', was released August 5, 2009. Since release of Argent Tournament in patch 3.1.0, players have been fighting champions of each faction. Patch 3.2.0 added the Crusader's Coliseum raid, a PvP season 7, a new Battleground, Isle of Conquest and some Argent Tournament quests. The final major patch for the expansion, Patch 3.3, 'Fall of the Lich King', was released on December 9, 2009. It added the Icecrown Citadel raid, where players would fight the Lich King and the main storyline came to a conclusion. Other new content included the Kalu’ak Fishing Derby. Cross server LFG (looking for group), which allowed players from different servers to play together in a dungeon. Patch 3.3.5, released on June 22, 2010, was a minor content patch that released the Ruby Sanctum raid and added cross-game chat using Battle.net. The raid features fighting against the black dragonflight that is attempting to destroy the Sanctum to facilitate Deathwing's reemergence.

On September 19, 2012, the Wrath of the Lich King expansion was completely merged with the original World of Warcraft game, just as the Burning Crusade expansion was the previous year. Now all players who purchase the original game automatically receive The Burning Crusade and Wrath of the Lich King at no additional cost. This merging of the expansions with the original game is called a "Battle Chest".

In April 2022, Blizzard announced the expansion was coming to World of Warcraft Classic. Wrath of the Lich King Classic was released on September 26, 2022.

== Reception ==
Reception

Aggregate score
Aggregator	Score
Metacritic	91/100

Review scores
Publication	Score
1Up.com	A−
Eurogamer	10/10
G4	5/5
GameSpot	9.0/10
GameSpy	4.5/5
GameTrailers	92/100
GameZone	9.5/10
IGN	9.0/10
PC Zone	8.6/10
VideoGamer.com	9/10

Wrath of the Lich King was critically acclaimed, scoring a 91 out of 100 on Metacritic. Since its release, this expansion has often been recognized as World of Warcraft's best expansion by critics and fans. The game reached its peak in October 2010 with over 12 million subscribers.

During the 12th Annual Interactive Achievement Awards, the Academy of Interactive Arts & Sciences awarded Wrath of the Lich King with "Massively Multiplayer Game of the Year", along with receiving nominations for "Computer Game of the Year" and "Outstanding Achievement in Original Music Composition".

=== Sales ===
The set sold 2.8 million copies within the first 24 hours of availability. This had made it the fastest selling computer game of all time, beating the record set by the previous World of Warcraft expansion The Burning Crusade, which had sold 2.4 million within its first 24 hours. It received a "Gold" sales award from the Entertainment and Leisure Software Publishers Association (ELSPA), indicating sales of at least 200,000 copies in the United Kingdom. It later lost its rank as number one after Blizzard released Diablo III, which sold over 3.5 million copies within its first 24 hours on the market.
