= World of Warcraft: The War Within =

2024 expansion set for World of Warcraft

- Cover art of World of Warcraft: The War Within
- Developer: Blizzard Entertainment (Note: Additional work by Blizzard Boston)
- Publisher: Blizzard Entertainment
- Director: Ion Hazzikostas
- Producer: Holly Longdale
- Designers: Chris Metzen; Ely Cannon; Toby Ragaini; Evan Lee; Raphael Ahad; Dani Merrithew
- Composers: Leo Kaliski; Neal Acree; David Arkenstone; Grant Kirkhope; Glenn Stafford
- Series: Warcraft
- Platforms: Windows; macOS
- Release: August 26, 2024
- Genre: Massively multiplayer online role-playing game
- Mode: Multiplayer

World of Warcraft: The War Within is the tenth expansion pack for the massively multiplayer online role-playing game (MMORPG) World of Warcraft, following Dragonflight. It was announced in November 2023, and released on August 26, 2024. It acts as the first part of the Worldsoul Saga trilogy of expansions, led by Chris Metzen, the executive creative director of the Warcraft franchise.

== Gameplay ==
The primary setting for The War Within is the subterranean continent of Khaz Algar, divided into four distinct zones: the Isle of Dorn, the Ringing Deeps, Hallowfall, and Azj-Kahet while the capital city of Dornogal serves as a central hub for players. The primary narrative revolves around the Harbinger of the Void, Xal'atath, who mobilizes her forces to pose a threat to both Khaz Algar and Azeroth as a whole. Following the completion of the main campaign, players can unlock a new playable race, the earthen, which are available to both the Horde and the Alliance. Dungeons and raids continue to play a key role, with eight new dungeons and a raid added as end-game content.

The level cap in The War Within has been raised to 80, allowing players to further develop their characters with new abilities and talents. Starting at level 71, players can unlock new Hero Talents for every class and specialization, providing more depth to character customization and combat strategies. The Skyriding feature, initially introduced in Dragonflight as Dragonriding, allows players to explore the new zones at a fast pace while using various in-game mounts. The Delves feature has players tackle instanced content alongside a dedicated NPC companion and provides solo or cooperative play for up to five players to defeat bosses and obtain end-game loot. The Warbands feature acts as an account-wide system, allowing players to progress reputations and achievements across multiple characters.

== Plot ==
=== The War Within campaign ===
==== Visions of Azeroth ====
As numerous individuals across Azeroth experience strange visions known as the Radiant Song, Thrall, Lady Jaina Proudmoore and the former High King of the Alliance Anduin Wrynn seek out the diamond-bodied Magni Bronzebeard who had previously been able to communicate with the Azeroth's Worldsoul (Note: During the events of the Battle for Azeroth expansion) that had now been silent for several years. After Magni is injured attempting to commune with Azeroth, they relocate to the floating city of Dalaran, home of the Kirin Tor mages, along with Magni's daughter, Moira Thaurissan, and her son, Dagran Thaurissan II. They consult Archmage Khadgar and Alleria Windrunner on how to proceed, and Magni awakens to explain that Azeroth warned him of dark forces on the subterranean continent of Khaz Algar, so Dalaran is teleported above it to investigate the undiscovered land. Alleria, who had been hunting the mysterious Void entity known as Xal'atath, (Note: During the events of the Dragonflight expansion.) discovers that her target had managed to infiltrate Dalaran and launches a full-scale assault on the city with an army of nerubians, an ancient race of intelligent spiders previously thought to be near extinct, (Note: During the events of the Wrath of the Lich King expansion.) who begin kidnapping civilians. After Alleria and Anduin evacuate Dalaran's remaining citizens, Khadgar confronts Xal'atath and witnesses her absorbing the arcane energies of Dalaran into the Dark Heart relic before she obliterates the city, seemingly killing the archmage along with it.

==== Into the Deeps ====
The survivors of Dalaran's destruction find themselves on the Isle of Dorn and hold off another nerubian assault while rescuing survivors from the rubble. They soon run into Stormward Baelgrim, leader of the Stormriders earthen, who details how his people have been isolated on the island for millennia and that they strictly follow a set of edicts issued by the Titans. He reluctantly agrees to work with the outsiders, and they attempt to defend the earthen capital of Dornogal from the nerubians, but they succeed in damaging the Coreway, a large access tunnel that connects the surface to the rest of Khaz Algar underground. Upon meeting Councilward Merrix, leader of the Oathsworn earthen, he accepts the outsider's aid while Thrall and Jaina leave the island to gather Horde and Alliance reinforcements. Baelgrim then seeks out Stoneward Adelgonn, the estranged leader of the Unbound earthen. Despite her history of rejecting the Titan's edicts, Baelgrim recruits her to repair the Coreway. He then attempts to rally the Stormriders together, only to discover that the vast majority had been killed in his absence. With the lack of an earthen military force, Adelgonn lays a trap to fend off the nerubians. Baelgrim sacrifices himself to defeat the nerubian commander, saving Dornogal from further incursions. Inspired by Baelgrim's sacrifice, Merrix and Adelgonn reform the Council of Dornogal, and the Coreway is soon repaired. Alleria, who is being taunted by visions of Xal'atath, quickly heads underground to pursue her target, seeking vengeance for Dalaran's destruction.

Now able to access the Coreway, Brinthe, a representative of the Machine Speakers earthen, travels to the settlement of Gundargaz in the Ringing Deeps. She finds that her people are in disarray as the Awakening Machine, a facility used to recharge the earthen, remained in a state of disrepair, meaning the earthen would eventually all shut down. Brinthe is soon joined by Magni, Moira, and Dagran, who together meet with High Speaker Eirich, leader of the Machine Speakers, who dismisses Brinthe's concerns and the numerous problems his people face, seeking only to reactivate the Awakening Machine. Deciding to solve the issues herself, Brinthe allies with a group of rebellious kobolds and helps depose their tyrannical leader, ending kobold attacks on earthen settlements. Magni and Dagran investigate an abandoned mine only to discover it overrun with skardyn, earthen corrupted with void magic, and soon learn that Eirich allowed Xal'atath to help repair the Awakening Machine, but that anyone who uses it becomes skardyn. Brinthe then confronts Eirich, who finishes corrupting the Awakening Machine out of self-preservation. Magni manages to call upon Azeroth's Worldsoul to help purify the machine, shattering his diamond form and returning him to his original dwarven body. With the Awakening Machine reactivated, the earthen could now be recharged and no longer faced extinction, and dormant earthen could be reawakened. Brinthe takes Eirich's place as High Speaker and unites the Machine Speakers and kobolds to defeat Eirich and his skardyn forces before returning to the surface to join the Council of Dornogal.

After Anduin learns from the earthen that they previously traded with a race known as the Arathi, mixed-race descendants of humans and high elves from the ancient Empire of Arathor, he travels to the expansive cavern known as Hallowfall. He quickly discovers Beledar, an immense crystal embedded in the cavern's ceiling that acts as an inner sun, and meets Faerin Lothar, a hopeful Arathi Lamplighter, who protects the Arathi from threats by lighting Dawntowers that radiate holy light. She explains that the Arathi were part of an expedition sent by the Arathi Empire's prophetic emperor fifteen years prior, but became stranded in Hallowfall. Anduin and Faerin then arrive at Hallowfall's border wall, where they hold off a nerubian attack. Alleria soon joins them, and they witness Beledar shift into a temporary Void state. The trio then meets with General Vaelisia Steelstrike, who commands the Arathi military, and they fend off a raid by the monstrous kobyss who attack whenever Beledar shifts. They soon discover that the Order of Night, a group of void cultists allied with Xal'atath, were attempting to corrupt the area. Anduin then struggles to purify a Dawntower corrupted by the cultist's leader Aelric Leid after previously losing access to his Light abilities, (Note: During the events of the Shadowlands expansion.) but is aided by Faerin. Anduin and Alleria soon join the combined Arathi forces led by Steelstrike in defending the city of Mereldar from a joint invasion of the Order of Night and the kobyss, where they defeat Aelric before he can corrupt the Arathi's sacred Eternal Flame. The nerubians soon launch another offensive on the border, and after fending them off as long as they can, Alleria and Faerin board an airship to escape. Anduin stays behind to protect the others and is quickly overwhelmed.

Seeking to rescue Anduin from his captors, Alleria and Faerin descend into the nerubian kingdom of Azj-Kahet, where their airship quickly becomes ensnared in its webbed defenses. Before they can be overwhelmed, the mysterious druid Orweyna comes to their aid. She reveals herself to be a haranir, a reclusive subterranean race who came to Azj-Kahet to protect the great roots throughout the region from the corruptive Black Blood of the deceased Old Gods that permeate the area, but is forced to leave due to her people's isolationist traditions. Widow Arak'nai, a nerubian spymaster known as "the Weaver", contacts Faerin seeking allies to stand against Queen Ansurek, the ruler of Azj-Kahet and Xal'atath's closest ally, who usurped her own mother, Queen Neferess, to whom the Weaver was deeply loyal. After Ansurek made a bargain with Xal'atath to restore her struggling kingdom's former glory, many nerubians in positions of authority were replaced by the Ascended, nerubians transformed by the Black Blood. This angered the traditionalist Anub'azal, the former commander of the nerubian military known as "the General". To undermine Ansurek's authority, the General works with the goblin Monte Gazlowe, Trade Prince of the Bilgewater Cartel, to free numerous prisoners who were captured during the assault on Dalaran and were brought to Azj-Kahet to be experimented on. After receiving an invitation to visit the nerubian capital, the City of Threads, Alleria meets with Executor Nizrek, one of Ansurek's advisors known as "the Vizier", who had become horrified by the queen's actions and secretly rescued Anduin. They then observe one of Ansurek's speeches and witness Xal'atath by her side. Alleria impulsively attempts to assassinate Xal'atath, who easily avoids the attack, and Ansurek sends guards to apprehend them, forcing Anduin and Alleria to flee. They inform the Weaver of what transpired in the city, and she contacts the General and the Vizier, who together decide to form the Severed Threads conspiracy to launch an insurrection against Ansurek.

==== Algari Offensive ====
After returning to the surface, Anduin and Alleria inform their allies of the danger they face if Xal'atath is allowed to proceed with her plans. Thrall and Jaina soon reach the Isle of Dorn with a large fleet of Horde and Alliance ships and begin training the earthen for war. With the combined might of the earthen, Arathi, Horde, and Alliance, they form the Algari Offensive to protect Khaz Algar and stop Xal'atath. While the Council of Dornogal had been restored with Merrix, Adelgonn, and Brinthe among its members, they still sought to reform the Stormriders and find a new Stormward to lead them. Thrall seeks out Lufsela, who tends to the elemental stormrooks that the Stormriders use as mounts, and together they recruit new riders and manage to summon forth new stormrooks to use in battle. The council soon decides to renounce the Titan's edicts for good, giving the earthen the freedom of choice and to assist their new allies better. For her help in restoring the Stormriders to their former glory, Lufsela is made the new Stormward, making the Council of Dornogal whole for the first time in thousands of years.

Wanting to assist with the war effort, Brinthe and Dagran travel to the Deepforge Golemworks, an abandoned facility that once produced war golems, only to find it overrun by the Darkfuse Enforcement, a goblin mercenary company. They work together to restore a hydropower plant and restart a mining operation, allowing them to reanimate dormant war golems that quickly disperse the goblins, and the facility is reactivated. Seeking to uncover intel that would benefit their cause, the Weaver has her quartermaster, Y'tekhi, undergo ascension to infiltrate the City of Threads. After seeking assistance from the surface, Y'tekhi is joined by the forsaken Lillian Voss, and they sneak into the Transformatory, where the Ascended were created. They soon discover that the deposed nerubian queen Neferess was still alive but had been turned into a monstrous abomination as part of a failed experiment. Y'tekhi is then possessed by Xal'atath, forcing Voss to subdue them and flee the area, only to discover a vast operation where nerubians were transporting Black Blood to Hallowfall.

With the reformed Stormriders and newly constructed war golems, the earthen join the Arathi in Hallowfall to defend against an impending invasion of nerubians led by Xal'atath. The Algari Offensive defeats the invading nerubians, only for Alleria to discover that Black Blood was being channeled through Hallowfall toward the Priory of the Sacred Flame, where the Arathi worship Beledar, which had shifted into its Void state. Alleria, Anduin, and Faerin reach the priory where Neferess is compelled to attack them, but after she fights against Xal'atath's control, they spare her. Alleria then confronts Xal'atath, who had begun channeling energy from Beledar into the Dark Heart. She fires an arrow that strikes and cracks open the Dark Heart, angering Xal'atath, who hastily retreats. As Xal'atath portals away, Khadgar emerges from the portal and collapses, having been trapped inside the Dark Heart since Dalaran's destruction. As Beledar shifts back into its Light state, Anduin rekindles his Light abilities and heals the archmage. Alleria and Anduin then bring Khadgar to Dornogal to recover, and Neferess is brought to the Weaver in Azj-Kahet.

With Ansurek's forces weakened, many citizens in the City of Threads are abducted and forced into becoming Ascended. Horrified by these actions, the Severed Threads conspirators, the Weaver, General, and Vizier, then launch a joint assault on Nerub-ar Palace, Ansurek's seat of power. They defeat the queen's monstrous experiments and army of Ascended while Ansurek becomes paranoid and begins executing many of her subjects, suspecting them all to be traitors. The conspirators soon engage Ansurek herself, who, in a final desperate move, attempts to undergo ascension but is defeated. Xal'atath then appears before the dying queen and informs her that their cooperation was only a means to an end before departing. Victorious in their campaign, the conspirators gather around Ansurek's corpse and plan for their kingdom's future.

=== Undermine(d) campaign ===
==== Lingering Shadows ====
With Xal'atath having retreated following the disruption of her plans, Orweyna and her fellow haranir investigate the remaining Black Blood in Hallowfall. The other haranir in Orweyna's group become frustrated with her for ignoring their people's isolationist traditions before leaving her alone to return to their homeland. Orweyna then receives a vision from Azeroth's Worldsoul that leads her to the Ringing Deeps, where Gazlowe is investigating the large goblin presence at the newly established Opportunity Point and is joined by the spy Renzik "The Shiv", who shares his concerns. Orweyna scouts the goblin operation and learns that Jastor Gallywix, the former Trade Prince of the Bilgewater Cartel who previously abandoned the Horde, was responsible and had been making illicit deals to expand his influence.

Meanwhile, Gazlowe sends an expeditionary crew of goblins to investigate the mysterious Siren Isle after it was discovered when they were drawn to a singing crystal at its center. Intrigued by the discovery, the earthen and Arathi send their own expeditions to the storm-lashed island, with the latter coming to revere the crystal. They soon investigate a titan-forged vault on the island and learn about its history and the fate of the previous inhabitants. Despite their differences, the goblins, earthen, and Arathi agree to collaborate and share resources to uncover Siren Isle's secrets.

Still reeling from Dalaran's destruction, Archmage Aethas Sunreaver, one of the Kirin Tor's highest-ranking members, sends missives from Dalaran's crash site to rally the few remaining survivors and help decide the Kirin Tor's future. Kalecgos, Aspect of the Blue Dragonflight, is the first to respond and recovers magical artifacts stolen from the ruins, including a necklace that once belonged to the disgraced Archmage Kel'Thuzad, who was exiled from the Kirin Tor for practicing necromancy. (Note: During the events of Warcraft III: Reign of Chaos.) Jaina then helps dispose of a dangerous mana bomb that had been preserved by the Kirin Tor, despite one having previously destroyed the human city of Theramore. (Note: During the events of the Mists of Pandaria expansion.) Joined by the now wheelchair-using Khadgar, together they hold a memorial at the crash site. Eager to put the Kirin Tor's past mistakes behind them, Khadgar proposes they restart the Kirin Tor by not rebuilding Dalaran and disbanding its ruling Council of Six, while Jaina and Aethas work to bring the scattered mages back together.

==== Liberation of Undermine ====
After being alerted to a new cavern having been blown open at Opportunity Point, Gazlowe, Renzik, and Orweyna investigate. They find that the Venture Company cartel had begun harvesting vast amounts of Black Blood and shipping it to the goblin capital of Undermine. The engineer Pamsy is revealed to have blown open the cavern as a cry for help after her crew was killed, and together they thwart the mining operation. Pamsy then helps Gazlowe and his allies get transportation to Undermine, only to find that Gallywix had assumed control of the city using his personal army of mercenaries, the Darkfuse Enforcement cartel. Gazlowe discovers that his own people, the Bilgewater Cartel, were being openly harassed by the Darkfuse after Gallywix killed the goblin that Gazlowe had left in charge. Seeking allies, Pamsy takes them to the Incontinental Hotel and introduces them to Grimla Fizzlecrank, a high-ranking member of the Venture Co. who opposes their chairwoman, Nikki the Fixer, who had willingly sided with Gallywix, along with most of her cartel.

Gazlowe and Renzik learn from Grimla that the Blackwater Cartel, led by Trade Prince Revilgaz, had been smuggling Black Blood through Undermine. After confronting Revilgaz, he informs them that he was being coerced into helping Gallywix and that the Steamweedle Cartel, led by Trade Prince Marin Noggenfogger, was also involved. Alleria arrives in the city and joins Gazlowe and Renzik in confronting Marin, who was also being forced to aid Gallywix against his will. He tells them of another mining operation on the subcontinent of Zandalar, where the valuable ore kaja'mite was being harvested as it could stabilize the Black Blood and create dangerous weapons. Gazlowe and Renzik take transportation to Zandalar to investigate and learn that Gallywix was using the stabilized Black Blood to repair the Dark Heart for Xal'atath. They then return to Undermine, a group of Shadowguard void ethereals led by Phase-Thief Azir launch an assault, seeking the Dark Heart, but are repelled. Marin reveals to the others that high-value hostages were being used to control him and Revilgaz from a secret warehouse. Gazlowe and Renzik quickly free the hostages and Azir steals the Dark Heart from Gallywix before departing. Now that Gallywix no longer has leverage over them, Marin and Revilgaz join forces with Gazlowe, Renzik, and Grimla, while Alleria leaves Undermine to continue hunting for Xal'atath.

As Gazlowe plans his next move, Nikki attempts to assassinate him with a Black Blood-infused rifle, but Renzik dives in front of Gazlowe and is killed. Renzik's sacrifice makes him a martyr, and Gazlowe leads a revolution against Gallywix, liberating each district of Undermine from the Darkfuse and cutting off their supply of Black Blood weapons. Gallywix retreats to his personal casino, the Gallagio, and the citizens of Undermine march upon it, demanding his removal. Gazlowe avenges Renzik by killing Nikki while Gallywix begs Xal'atath for help, who instead abandons him after learning that the Shadowguard had taken the Dark Heart. Gazlowe and the revolutionaries then storm the Gallagio, defeat the Darkfuse, and engage Gallywix, who is crushed to death by his own damaged mech, ending his reign over Undermine. In the aftermath of the revolution, Grimla assumes control of the Venture Co., while the remaining Darkfuse rebrand their cartel and plan to make amends. Gazlowe sends word to Renzik's closest friend, the Alliance spymaster Mathias Shaw, and together they spread Renzik's ashes. With Undermine finally freed, Gazlowe, Marin, Revilgaz, and Grimla plan for the future of their city and its people. Meanwhile, with the Dark Heart in hand, Azir returns to the shattered ethereal homeworld of K'aresh.

==== Legacy of Arathor ====
Having received reports of unrest in the human kingdom of Stromgarde, Faerin volunteers to visit her people's ancestral home and joins its ruler, Lord Danath Trollbane, and the leader of the Mag'har orcs, Overlord Geya'rah, in traveling to the Arathi Highlands. They discover a settlement under attack by the Defias Brotherhood bandit organization, who had been recruited into the human supremacist faction, the Red Dawn. Danath informs Faerin of his incarcerated niece, Lady Marran Trollbane, who previously attempted to reignite a war with the Horde and evict them from the highlands in the name of human superiority. (Note: During the events of the Heartlands novella) Faerin and Danath then visit the city of Stromgarde, where they find its citizens starving and lacking resources as Danath has committed his kingdom's troops to the campaign in Khaz Algar. Faerin works with Danath's second-in-command, Veronica Nials, to dispel Marran's loyalists who were harassing non-humans and seeking support from disgruntled human sympathizers. Faerin then visits Marran in her cell and learns that she is the leader of the Red Dawn, and leaves to warn Danath.

After being informed by Nials that Danath had been called to the orcish stronghold of Hammerfall, Faerin stops at a human settlement along the way and finds its people massacred by the fanatical Scarlet Crusade cult, who had allied with the Red Dawn. She then meets with the aging orc Eitrigg in Hammerfall, who had begun sheltering human refugees, but discovers that Danath is missing. The human refugees are revealed to be spies from the Syndicate, a criminal organization that had also aligned with the Red Dawn. After liberating Hammerfall, Faerin, Geya'rah, and Eitrigg find evidence of an ambush where Danath had been abducted and discover that orcish weapons had been planted at the scene so they would take the blame, potentially inciting a war. Hoping to prevent further conflict, Geya'rah and Eitrigg head to the Red Dawn's base of operations and rescue the captured Danath. Faerin seeks help in Stromgarde, but is quickly captured when she discovers that Nials had been working for Marran and released her as part of a coup to take control of the city. While Danath's forces battle the Red Dawn in the city streets, Faerin escapes confinement and defeats Marran in a duel. Instead of making Marran a martyr, Danath banishes her from his kingdom, along with Nials and the loyalists. While remaining disappointed at seeing her ancestral home reduced to civil war, Faerin agrees to help Danath and Eitrigg rebuild and ensure Stromgarde's future.

=== Ghosts of K'aresh campaign ===
==== A Knife's Edge ====
Still hunting for Xal'atath, Alleria meets with her ethereal mentor, Locus-Walker, who requests that she abandon her search and travel with him to the remnants of K'aresh, the destroyed homeworld of the ethereals and the brokers. He explains that the Shadowguard are planning to use the Dark Heart to revive Dimensius the All-Devouring, a powerful Void Lord that was responsible for K'aresh's destruction. They arrive in Tazavesh, the broker capital previously located in the Shadowlands, and ally with the K'aresh Trust, a coalition of ethereals and brokers seeking to reclaim the remaining fragment of their world. The Shadowguard soon assaults the city, but they are repelled with the help of Locus-Walker's mysterious ally, whom Alleria is surprised to learn is Xal'atath. She reveals to Alleria that thousands of years prior, she served as the Harbinger of Dimensius and betrayed him to free herself from his service. Xal'atath then allied with the Ravel, a secret collective that included Locus-Walker, and together they used powerful artifacts known as the Reshii Ribbons to survive K'aresh's destruction. Despite feeling betrayed that her mentor would keep this knowledge from her, Alleria reluctantly agrees to work with her sworn enemy temporarily.

To stop Dimensius from being revived, Alleria, Locus-Walker, and Xal'atath set out to collect each of the Reshii Ribbons from the remaining members of the Ravel. With Locus-Walker already in possession of one, they visit the broker Ve'nari, leader of the K'aresh Trust, to retrieve another. They aid Ve'nari by defending her eco-dome from a Shadowguard incursion, and in return, she gives them her Reshii Ribbon. To further incite distrust between Alleria and Locus-Walker, Xal'atath informs Alleria that the Ravel willingly destroyed their already doomed world using the combined power of the Reshii Ribbons in an attempt to kill Dimensius and preserve their species, causing a frustrated Alleria to leave. Locus-Walker and Xal'atath then head to another eco-dome only to find a member of the Ravel dead, their Reshii Ribbon stolen, and the eco-dome destroyed. They quickly discover that the Wastelanders, a faction of ethereals who previously worshipped K'aresh's Worldsoul and now oppose the Ravel, were responsible for taking the Reshii Ribbon. Xal'atath meets with their leader, Soul-Scribe, and convinces her to join them by showing the Wastelanders an echo of K'aresh's Worldsoul.

With three Reshii Ribbons obtained and an army of Wastelanders to aid them, Locus-Walker and Xal'atath are rejoined by Alleria, who had brought her own people, the void elves, as reinforcements. Together, they assault several Shadowguard garrisons to find the final Reshii Ribbon, which they obtain after killing Azir, but learn that he no longer has the Dark Heart. Before the group can continue, they are confronted by Nexus-King Salhadaar, leader of the Shadowguard and former ruler of K'aresh, who had been remade in the Void following his death during his previous attempt to revive Dimensius. (Note: During the events of The Burning Crusade expansion.) Salhadaar demands that the Wastelanders uphold their sacred oaths to serve him, and Soul-Scribe reluctantly betrays her new allies but flees after Alleria swiftly kills her guards. Xal'atath then assembles the collected Reshii Ribbons, and they enter the Shadowguard's base of operations at Manaforge Omega, where Salhadaar prepares to revive Dimensius using the Dark Heart.

The combined forces of the K'aresh Trust and the void elves invade the manaforge, vanquish the Shadowguard's forces, and confront Salhadaar. They defeat the Nexus-King, and Xal'atath absorbs his power before she, Alleria, and Locus-Walker engage Dimensius' weakened physical form. Dimensius soon pulls them into the Dark Heart, but they defeat the Void Lord, recover a shard of K'aresh's Worldsoul, and Xal'atath helps Alleria and Locus-Walker escape. With both Dimensius' essence and Xal'atath contained within the Dark Heart, Locus-Walker retrieves the artifact, only for Xal'atath to emerge from within and kill Locus-Walker in the process. With the fully empowered Dark Heart in hand, Xal'atath leaves to enact her long-delayed plans while Alleria mourns her deceased mentor. Seeking to avenge Locus-Walker and her goal to stop Xal'atath renewed, Alleria makes an oath to hunt the Harbinger down, and Ve'nari warns her that Xal'atath's next target will likely be Azeroth. After receiving the shard of K'aresh's Worldsoul, Ve'nari learns that the remaining Wastelanders have assaulted one of her eco-domes to fulfill their oath to Salhadaar, but they are swiftly defeated. Ve'nari offers Soul-Scribe a way to save K'aresh's Worldsoul and performs a ritual where Soul-Scribe sacrifices herself to strengthen the fragile Worldsoul, giving it a chance to survive.

==== The Warning ====
Troubled by strange visions, Vereesa Windrunner, Alleria's younger sister, and Arator, Alleria's son, travel to the Isle of Dorn seeking answers. While paying their respects to those killed in Dalaran's destruction, Vereesa experiences an intense vision of Silvermoon City, capital of the blood elves, being overrun by the forces of the Void. After surviving an assassination attempt by void cultists, Arator travels to K'aresh seeking his mother's advice. He discovers Alleria hunting a Shadowguard lieutenant and helps capture them so she can extract information. Alleria learns that Xal'atath has formed the Devouring Host, a vast army of void creatures. Arator asks his mother to join him and Vereesa in defending Silvermoon from future invasion, but Alleria remains committed to her hunt. With Ve'nari's assistance, Arator then uses a gateway to enter the Shadowlands, where his aunt, Sylvanas Windrunner, had been sentenced to freeing souls from the Maw as penance for her past actions. Arator finds that the Devouring Host had followed him into the Maw and helps Sylvanas remove them. He also aids his aunt in gathering lost souls and tries to convince her to return to Azeroth, but Sylvanas insists that her duty is to remain among the dead. Arator then returns to Vereesa and informs her of what transpired before they set off for Silvermoon. Meanwhile, Alleria manages to locate Xal'atath and witnesses her unleash the energy from the Dark Heart to create the Voidstorm.

== Development ==
World of Warcraft: The War Within was announced at BlizzCon on November 3, 2023 as the first entry in the Worldsoul Saga trilogy, led by Chris Metzen. Alongside The War Within Blizzard Entertainment also announced a further two expansions: Midnight, and The Last Titan with plans to release new expansions and patches faster than before.

== Reception ==
Reception

Aggregate scores
Aggregator	Score
Metacritic	85/100
OpenCritic	97% recommend

The War Within received "generally favorable" reviews with a score of 85 on the review aggregation website Metacritic, based on 35 critic reviews. Fellow review aggregator OpenCritic assessed that the game received "mighty" approval, being recommended by 97% of critics. Leana Hafer from IGN praised the expansion, stating that it represents "the best it's ever been" for the game, highlighting the story, environments, music, and new features. Robin Baird from MMORPG.com noted that the expansion sets a strong precedent for future content. Alex Avard from GamesRadar+ mentioned that while the expansion isn't groundbreaking, it does a great job of setting the stage for the Worldsoul Saga.
