= World of Warcraft: Shadowlands =

2020 expansion set for World of Warcraft

- Collector's Edition cover art
- Developer: Blizzard Entertainment
- Publisher: Blizzard Entertainment
- Director: Ion Hazzikostas
- Producer: John Hight
- Series: Warcraft
- Platforms: Windows, macOS
- Release: November 23, 2020
- Genre: Massively multiplayer online role-playing game
- Mode: Multiplayer

World of Warcraft: Shadowlands is the eighth expansion pack for the massively multiplayer online role-playing game (MMORPG) World of Warcraft, following Battle for Azeroth. It was announced and made available for preorder at BlizzCon on November 1, 2019. Originally scheduled for release on October 27, 2020, its release was delayed until November 23, the sixteenth anniversary of the original game's release.

The expansion opens up the Shadowlands, the realm of the dead in Warcraft lore. It features the game's first "level squish" and a completely overhauled leveling system, access to the Death Knight class for the races that did not previously have access to it, Covenants in the new zones, and new dungeons and raids.

On February 20, 2021, Chains of Domination (Patch 9.1) was announced. A new location, Korthia, was added to the Shadowlands. Chains of Domination also released a new raid called "Sanctum of Domination" which features iconic World of Warcraft character Sylvanas Windrunner as the final boss. The patch went live on June 29, 2021, for the US region, and on June 30 for EU.

On February 22, 2022, Eternity's End (Patch 9.2) was released, including a new zone known as Zereth Mortis, home of the originators of all reality. A new raid, "The Sepulcher of the First Ones", concluded the story of Shadowlands by having the expansion's main antagonist, Zovaal the Jailer, as its final boss.

== Gameplay ==
Shadowlands involves a level reduction ("level squish") with player characters at level 120 (the level cap in Battle for Azeroth) are reduced to level 50 and with level 60 being the new level cap (as it had been in the original game). In what Blizzard has called a "New Game+ experience", newly created characters have an updated starting experience on an island called "Exile's Reach", which introduces them to the game and its systems. For players new to World of Warcraft, characters who finish the starting experience on Exile's Reach proceed to Battle for Azeroth content, while veteran players who create new characters can choose the expansion experience they wish to play through to level 50, at which point they proceed to the Shadowlands.

Shadowlands features four leveling zones – Bastion, Ardenweald, Revendreth, and Maldraxxus – and an endgame zone called the Maw. In the center is the city of Oribos, which functions as the main player hub, similar to Shattrath City in Outland in The Burning Crusade or Dalaran in Wrath of the Lich King and Legion. There are four new dungeons for leveling, four more at maximum level, and a new raid. In addition, a new roguelike "endless dungeon" called Torghast, Tower of the Damned, was introduced for both solo and group play.

All playable core races (not allied races) received new customization options (for example, humans are able to customize their ethnicities, dwarves and trolls gain tattoos, and undead are able to show varying degrees of decay). The Death Knight class (added in Wrath of the Lich King) was opened up to pandaren (added in Mists of Pandaria) and to all allied races (added in Legion and Battle for Azeroth); players who pre-ordered Shadowlands received access to death knights for these races with the release of Patch 8.3.0, Battle for Azeroth's last major content patch, on January 14, 2020.

=== Covenants ===
The four leveling zones that comprise the Shadowlands are ruled by "Covenants", similar to the Class Orders introduced in Legion. Each Covenant has its own campaign, similar to the War Campaign in Battle for Azeroth, with gear specific to the faction and abilities both universal and determined by class. The four covenants are the Kyrian of Bastion, the Night Fae of Ardenweald, the Venthyr of Revendreth, and the Necrolords of Maldraxxus. Players experiencing the Shadowlands content for the first time are required to reach level 60 before they can choose to pledge themselves to a Covenant, while alternative characters are able to do so at the start of the Shadowlands content.

Throughout the Covenant campaigns, players are able to insert conduits into the "Forge of Bonds," a system which increases a player's stats and abilities. The Covenant campaigns also introduced a progression system known as Renown, which when raised gives the players rewards. Players can raise their Renown by completing dungeons, raids, or certain quests for their Covenant. The maximum Renown a player could have at the launch of the game was 40, though this was increased to 80 with the Chains of Domination update.

=== Torghast, Tower of the Damned ===
Shadowlands introduced a rogue-like dungeon at launch called Torghast, Tower of the Damned. Parts of the Shadowlands campaign are centered in Torghast. The tower introduced a non-player character called the Runecarver, who can add certain powers to pieces of armour when players return his Memories to him. In order to make these legendary items one needs an armour or jewelry piece that coincides with their class's preferred armour type, as well as Soul Ash, a currency found while progressing through Torghast. Players wishing to create the highest power legendary items must embark on difficult challenges on the highest levels of Torghast to obtain a second currency, Soul Cinders.

== Plot ==
=== Death Rising ===
After murdering High Overlord Saurfang using otherworldly powers (at the end of Battle for Azeroth), Sylvanas Windrunner travels to Icecrown Citadel, where she takes the Lich King's Helm of Domination from its current wearer Bolvar Fordragon and destroys it, tearing a rift in the sky above Icecrown leading to the Shadowlands, realm of the dead. Dark angelic figures kidnap King Anduin Wrynn, former Warchief Thrall, tauren chieftain Baine Bloodhoof, and Lady Jaina Proudmoore and hold them in Torghast, the maze-like Tower of the Damned within the Maw. Tyrande Whisperwind—empowered by the moon goddess Elune as the "Night Warrior" after the burning of the World Tree Teldrassil, and aided by Azeroth's champions—confronts and kills Sylvanas' consort, Nathanos Blightcaller, outside his former homestead in the Eastern Plaguelands.

=== Into the Shadowlands ===
The Knights of the Ebon Blade (the order of Death Knights who had broken from the Scourge in Wrath of the Lich King) use the fragments of the Helm of Domination to teleport into the Shadowlands with the heroes of Azeroth. They arrive in the Maw, a place of eternal damnation, and make their way through the armies of Zovaal the Jailer, the "Banished One" who rules the Maw; it is revealed that Sylvanas has made a pact with the Jailer. Upon finding a waystone placed by the enigmatic "First Ones", the champions escape the Maw and arrive in Oribos, the Eternal City at the center of the Shadowlands. There, they learn that the Arbiter, who judges the souls of the dead, has gone dormant, condemning all incoming souls to the Maw. Because of this, the realms of the Shadowlands are suffering from a drought of Anima, the essence of souls. In order to discover the cause of the disruption, the attendants send the champions to the four realms of the Shadowlands: Bastion, home of the angelic Kyrian; Maldraxxus, home of the undead Necrolords; Ardenweald, home of the enchanted Night Fae; and Revendreth, home to the vampiric and demonic Venthyr.

In Bastion, the heroes discover that the spirit of Uther the Lightbringer, the first Paladin, has joined with a group of renegade Kyrian known as the Forsworn, who seek to overthrow Kyrestia the Firstborne, the Archon of Bastion. Unbeknownst to Uther, they are in the service of the Jailer. An attack by Necrolord forces leads the heroes to Maldraxxus, which is in the throes of civil war; they are joined by Draka, Thrall's mother and member of the House of the Chosen, in collecting the regalia of the Primus, the missing ruler of Maldraxxus. In Ardenweald, the heroes discover the contained spirit of Ysera, the Aspect of the green dragonflight who had been killed in Legion. Ardenweald's ruler, the Winter Queen, is reluctant to deal with Ysera due to lingering enmity with Elune, but she ultimately awakens Ysera as a spirit bound to Ardenweald. In Revendreth, the heroes discover that its ruler, Sire Denathrius, is in league with the Jailer; the heroes besiege Denathrius' stronghold of Castle Nathria and defeat him.

All the while, Baine, Thrall, and Jaina are recovered from Torghast thanks to the insight of Bolvar, but Anduin is kept hidden.

=== Chains of Domination ===
The Jailer needs sigils held by the rulers of each realm. Having already acquired the sigils of Denathrius and the Primus, the Jailer and Sylvanas force Anduin to become an agent of the Maw, and they use him to seize the sigils of the Archon and Winter Queen.

The heroes of Azeroth discover that the Primus has been imprisoned in Torghast under the guise of the "Runecarver", forced to craft armaments for the Jailer's Mawsworn army, as well as the Helm of Domination and Frostmourne, the regalia of the Lich King. After the heroes free him, the Primus reveals that Zovaal was the original Arbiter before the rulers of the Shadowlands banished him to the Maw for attempting to dominate all of creation, and that the dormant Arbiter now in Oribos had been created to replace him. The combined Covenant forces discover that they have been infiltrated by the Nathrezim, formerly thought to be demons serving the Burning Legion but actually agents of Denathrius. It is revealed that the Nathrezim have been behind nearly every major antagonist in Warcraft lore, including the Legion and the Scourge, as part of the Jailer's plan; they are also responsible for the Anima drought, having disabled the Arbiter with the corrupted spirit of the fallen Titan Argus (killed in Legion).

The heroes are also sent to aid Uther, who has repented for his part in the Forsworn rebellion and seeks to understand the fracturing of his soul by Frostmourne. After the heroes discover the fragment taken by Frostmourne in Torghast, they return to Bastion, where Uther relives his memories, ending with his death at the hands of Arthas Menethil. His choice to keep his memories as a lesson inspire the Kyrian, who believed that purging all memories was part of their duty, to change their methods. The heroes also seek the spirits of other Night Warriors to help save Tyrande, who is being torn apart by the Night Warrior's power. During the ritual to remove the Night Warrior's power, the Winter Queen is forced to intervene, and Tyrande is briefly possessed by the spirit of Elune. Elune and the Winter Queen reconcile, and Tyrande is restored to normal.

The Jailer prepares to attack Oribos to claim the dormant Arbiter's sigil. Azeroth's champions band together with Jaina, Thrall, and Bolvar to stop the invasion by breaching the Jailer's personal fortress, the Sanctum of Domination. The incursion ends for naught as the Jailer successfully acquires the Arbiter's sigil, transforming himself into an armored behemoth. The Jailer reveals his goal of forging his own reality where all serve him, going against Sylvanas's previous desire of breaking the cycle of death. Seeing the parallels between the Jailer and Arthas, who had forced her to serve him (in Warcraft III: Reign of Chaos), Sylvanas cuts ties with the Jailer. For her aid in his cause, the Jailer "rewards" Sylvanas with the fragment of her soul that was taken by Frostmourne, which causes her to pass out at the mercy of Azeroth's leaders, as the Jailer and Anduin escape.

=== Eternity's End ===
In order to pursue the Jailer, the Primus creates new sigils to open the gateway to the mystical realm of Zereth Mortis, where the First Ones created the Shadowlands. With the aid of Uther, Sylvanas' soul is restored, and she offers to help defeat the Jailer. With her help, champions discover a waystone that opens a doorway into the Sepulcher of the First Ones, where the Jailer has begun his redesign of the universe.

Azeroth's champions battle their way through the Sepulcher. Eventually, Anduin is sent to annihilate the invaders, but he is able to free himself from the Jailer's domination after recalling the spirits of Varok Saurfang and Varian Wrynn, Anduin's father. Anduin and Sylvanas then encounter and release the spirit of Arthas Menethil from within Anduin's broken Domination armor. With all their allies regrouped, the heroes of Azeroth finally defeat the Jailer. As he dies, he claims that his plan to unify the cosmos was meant as a preventative measure against something later to come.

With Zovaal defeated, Pelagos, an aspiring Kyrian who aided Uther in his journey, volunteers to become the new Arbiter and fill the vacancy left by its demise. Sylvanas is confronted over her actions during the War of the Thorns and the Jailer's rise to power, though Pelagos gives the final verdict to her long-time nemesis, Tyrande. Tyrande decides that Sylvanas' words of contrition, although genuine, are not enough to pay for what she did. Tyrande punishes Sylvanas by sending her to the Maw to retrieve lost souls that perished during the conflicts she orchestrated.

=== Balance Restored ===
As everything across the realms returns to normal, some leaders of Azeroth are met with conflicting decisions about their future. Anduin visits Sylvanas as she searches for souls within the Maw, where he reveals his uncertainty about being a leader after the actions he was forced to commit while under the Jailer's influence. In Ardenweald, the Winter Queen thanks Tyrande for helping her and Elune resolve their differences, and she gives Tyrande the seed of a world tree imbued with the souls of Night Elves who died in Teldrassil. In the ruins of Lordaeron, Calia Menethil confesses to Lilian Voss her wariness about being accepted anywhere due to being the last member of the Menethil line, but Voss reassures her that she is at home and is needed among the Forsaken.

== Reception ==
Reception

Aggregate score
Aggregator	Score
Metacritic	83/100

Review scores
Publication	Score
Game Informer	8.75
IGN	8/10
PC Gamer (US)	80/100

Shadowlands received "generally favorable" reviews with a score of 83 on Metacritic and an 8 out of 10 from IGN. PC Gamer gave the expansion an 80/100 in their review, describing Shadowlands as "[a]mbitious but uneven" and "an exciting evolution of World of Warcraft". Screen Rant claims that Shadowlands is "immensely fun", deserving of an "excellent" 4/5 score. The expansion "recaptures the allure of Wrath of the Lich King while preserving the accessibility of Battle for Azeroth". PCMag rated the expansion as excellent with a 4/5, writing that "[w]hile its endgame suffers a few stumbles, Shadowlands ... [has] meaningful narrative choices … [and] new gameplay elements that combine to make an excellent experience". Game Informer ranked the expansion with a score of 8.75/10. They argue that "Shadowlands plays it safe with numerous takes on established systems and structures, but … also takes chances with a deadly zone ..." called The Maw, "alongside a fantastic roguelike run tower" that is known as Torghast and is "full of surprises. As a result, Shadowlands is a satisfying addition to … World of Warcraft."

=== Sales ===
On launch day, following a four-week delay, World of Warcraft: Shadowlands sold 3.7 million copies, breaking the expansion sales records tied by Legion and Cataclysm, and even selling more on launch day than any PC game before it, a record previously held by Diablo III.

=== Player reception ===
While the players' initial reaction to the launch and first weeks of Shadowlands' late-game progression was positive, the overall sentiment went down considerably by the time the expansion's first major patch, Chains of Domination, came out. The majority of complaints pertained to several of the game's late-game systems, the developer's tendency to artificially extend game time by time-gating important gameplay and story milestones, and an unusually long delay between the expansion's release and the launch of its following patches.

The story also garnered significant criticism, particularly in relation to Sylvanas.
