= Anduin Wrynn =

Warcraft character

- Warcraft character
- Wrynn as he appears in World of Warcraft: Battle for Azeroth
- First appearance: World of Warcraft (2004)
- Created by: Blizzard Entertainment
- Voiced by: Josh Keaton

In-universe information
- Affiliation: Alliance
- Family: Varian Wrynn (father); Llane Wrynn (grandfather)
- Home: Stormwind, Eastern Kingdoms
- Class: Priest

Anduin Llane Wrynn is a fictional character in Blizzard Entertainment's Warcraft media franchise. He first appeared as a non-player character in the original release of World of Warcraft in 2004. The son of Tiffin and Varian Wrynn, Anduin is initially depicted as the child ruler of the human kingdom of Stormwind during his father's disappearance. Following Varian's return, he develops into a priest and diplomat whose preference for reconciliation frequently places him at odds with his father's militarism. After Varian's death in World of Warcraft: Legion, Anduin succeeds him as king of Stormwind and assumes leadership of the Alliance.

Anduin subsequently becomes a central character in World of Warcraft: Mists of Pandaria, World of Warcraft: Battle for Azeroth, World of Warcraft: Shadowlands and World of Warcraft: The War Within. Outside the main game, he appears as the default Priest hero in Hearthstone and as a playable healer in Heroes of the Storm. He is voiced by Josh Keaton.

Critical commentary has focused on Anduin's empathy, religious vocation and commitment to peace, particularly as a contrast to Varian's warrior identity. Later coverage has examined his suitability as a political leader, his vulnerability to manipulation, and the treatment of his psychological trauma following Shadowlands.

== Development ==
Anduin is named after two figures from Stormwind's history: his grandfather, King Llane Wrynn, and the military leader Anduin Lothar. Much of Anduin's early characterization was developed outside the game itself. His transformation from a largely passive child ruler into an independent character occurred principally through the Warcraft comic series and Christie Golden's novel World of Warcraft: The Shattering.

In a 2017 interview concerning World of Warcraft: Battle for Azeroth, designers Alex Afrasiabi and Shani Edwards discussed the decision to give Anduin a more active battlefield role. They said that he had not suddenly become an exceptional warrior, but had received training in weapons, martial skills and priestly abilities, including instruction from Varian. They regarded Anduin's visit to the Broken Shore and his acceptance of his father's sword as a significant stage in his transition into adulthood. The designers also clarified that Anduin remained a priest rather than becoming a paladin, explaining that his priestly identity permitted him to understand both Light and Shadow.

Keaton, who had previously played World of Warcraft as a member of the Horde, found it surreal to voice a character he had originally encountered as an unattackable child in Stormwind. He viewed Anduin as a moral compass whose education and royal upbringing gave him an unusually broad perspective for a young character. Keaton attempted to convey a regal bearing in his performance while distinguishing Anduin's confidence from the arrogance of his contemporary, Wrathion.

== Appearances ==
=== World of Warcraft ===
Anduin first appears in World of Warcraft as the young crown prince of Stormwind. During Varian's unexplained absence, Anduin is crowned king, although his age prevents him from governing independently. Highlord Bolvar Fordragon serves as regent while the disguised black dragon Onyxia, operating as Lady Katrana Prestor, manipulates Stormwind's government. Bolvar becomes Anduin's guardian and an acting father figure during Varian's absence.

The Warcraft comic series expands the circumstances surrounding Varian's disappearance and return. Anduin recognises that the compliant version of Varian returned to Stormwind does not behave like his father and alerts Bolvar to the discrepancy. Onyxia subsequently abducts Anduin, prompting the two magically separated versions of Varian to suspend their conflict and cooperate in rescuing him. Anduin assists during the confrontation with Onyxia before the two versions of his father are reunited.

After Varian resumes the throne, Anduin increasingly rejects the expectation that he should emulate his father as a warrior. He instead develops an affinity with the Holy Light and decides to train as a priest. This causes conflict with Varian, who attempts to prevent him from leaving to study under the draenei leader Velen.

In The Shattering, Anduin is present in Ironforge when Moira Thaurissan and the Dark Iron dwarves seize control of the city. Varian prepares to kill Moira, but Anduin intervenes and persuades his father to spare her, preventing a possible civil war and contributing to the creation of the Council of Three Hammers. During the same period, he concludes that his calling lies with the Light rather than martial leadership.

In World of Warcraft: Mists of Pandaria, Anduin travels to the newly discovered continent of Pandaria and attempts to prevent its peoples from being consumed by the renewed conflict between the Alliance and Horde. He opposes Horde warchief Garrosh Hellscream's efforts to weaponise the Divine Bell and is severely injured when Garrosh destroys it. Anduin also develops a complicated friendship with the black dragon Wrathion, who shares his desire to protect Azeroth but favours more ruthless methods. Stickney regarded Anduin's sustained commitment to peace as remarkable given the violence and political manipulation that had shaped his childhood.

In World of Warcraft: Legion, Varian is killed during the Alliance's assault on the Broken Shore. Anduin succeeds him as king but initially doubts his capacity to fulfil his father's political and military role. He later visits the site of Varian's death, where Genn Greymane gives him his father's sword. Anduin accepts the weapon and resolves to lead the Alliance against the Burning Legion.

Anduin serves as the principal Alliance leader in Battle for Azeroth. He directs the campaign against Horde warchief Sylvanas Windrunner while continuing to distinguish between the Horde as a people and Sylvanas's regime. During the later conflict with the Old God N'Zoth, Anduin reunites with Wrathion, whom he strikes in anger over Wrathion's earlier role in events that led to the Burning Legion's invasion.

In World of Warcraft: Shadowlands, Anduin is abducted by Sylvanas and taken into the realm of the dead. Zovaal, the Jailer, uses domination magic to control him and compels him to attack several of the covenants governing the Shadowlands. Anduin eventually breaks the Jailer's control but is psychologically affected by his actions and by his uncertainty over the extent to which the domination exploited impulses already within him. After Zovaal's defeat, he leaves Stormwind and spends the events of Dragonflight travelling alone.

Anduin returns in World of Warcraft: The War Within. Thrall locates him in Silithus after both characters begin experiencing visions connected to Azeroth. Still unwilling to resume his former title and struggling to call upon the Light, Anduin joins the expedition to Khaz Algar. His relationship with the Arathi paladin Faerin Lothar becomes part of his gradual attempt to recover his sense of purpose and reconcile his experiences under the Jailer's control.

=== Other appearances ===
Anduin appears as the default playable hero for the Priest class in Blizzard's digital card game Hearthstone. His hero power restores health, reflecting his established role as a priest and healer.

Anduin was added to Heroes of the Storm as a playable character in April 2019. He is classified as a ranged healer whose abilities allow him to heal allies, immobilise opponents and pull endangered teammates to his position. His heroic ability Holy Word: Salvation recreates the mass-healing scene associated with him in the cinematic trailer for Battle for Azeroth.

== Reception ==
Commentary on Anduin has frequently defined him through his contrast with Varian. Matthew McCurley described Anduin as his father's spiritual opposite: cautious but more open-minded, forgiving and willing to compromise. He considered the character's development in The Shattering evidence that Anduin could become a strong and compassionate human leader, but also as part of a deliberate effort by Blizzard to advance Anduin's story against the background of the changes introduced in World of Warcraft: Cataclysm. Dawn Moore of Engadget similarly characterised him as gentle but tenacious, patient and unusually wise, while observing that he shared Varian's force of will.

Anne Stickney observed that Anduin is named after two characters who represent different models of leadership: Lothar's martial heroism and Llane's benevolent rule. Stickney regarded Anduin's optimism as both his defining virtue and a potential weakness. She noted that his faith in diplomacy persisted despite the death of his mother, his father's instability, Bolvar's apparent death, repeated Horde aggression and his upbringing under Onyxia's manipulation. Stickney argued that his benevolence made him a source of hope but also left him naïve and vulnerable to exploitation, particularly by figures such as Wrathion.

The conflict between Anduin and his father also attracted criticism. Stickney observed that Varian's anger extended to Anduin primarily because his son chose the path of a priest rather than a warrior, culminating in an incident in which Varian nearly broke his arm while attempting to prevent him from leaving to study with Velen. Alex Ziebart praised Anduin's decision to remove himself from that situation, describing him as courageous for leaving Stormwind and condemning Varian's treatment of him as abusive.

Anduin's political role has received a more sceptical response. Cass Marshall of Polygon argued that Blizzard presented him as the figurehead of the supposedly virtuous faction during Battle for Azeroth, while giving insufficient attention to whether a young hereditary monarch was qualified to govern Stormwind and lead a coalition of several autonomous peoples. Marshall also questioned the assumptions underlying the Alliance's presentation as politically benevolent and drew attention to Anduin's dependence on older advisers such as Genn Greymane.

Marshall described Anduin's abduction before Shadowlands as the latest misfortune inflicted upon a character who had repeatedly been kidnapped, injured or burdened with political responsibility, finding the escalation simultaneously tragic and darkly comic.

Harvey Randall of PC Gamer considered Anduin's later development in The War Within compelling despite its dependence on the poorly received narrative of Shadowlands. He described Anduin as a traumatised king who had withdrawn from his former position and identified Faerin's optimism as an example of the qualities he wished to regain. Randall praised the expansion's optional conversations for allowing Anduin's recovery to form part of a broader character-focused narrative rather than treating it solely as exposition for the principal conflict.
