= Jesse Cox (YouTuber) =

American YouTube gaming personality (born 1981)

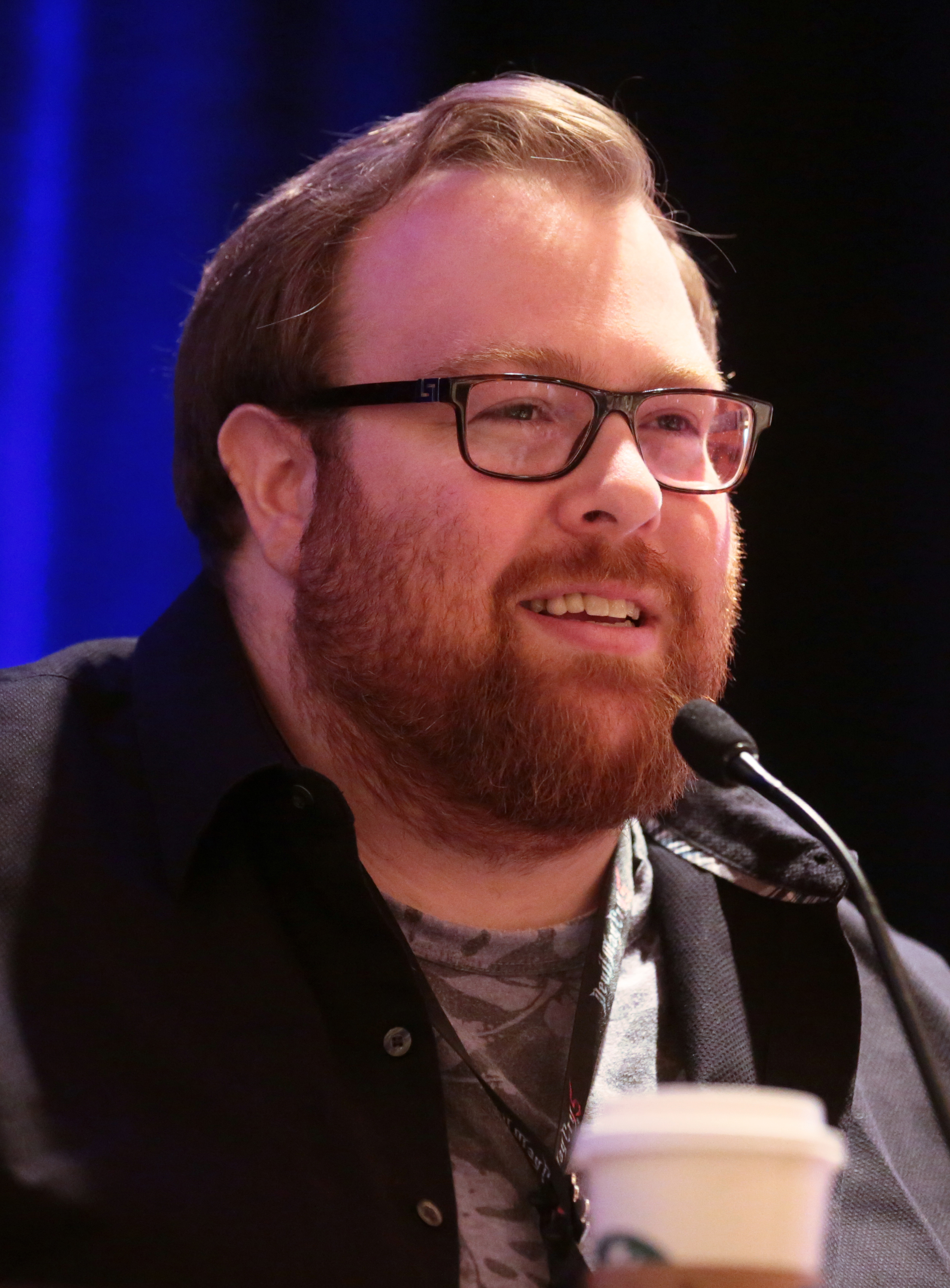
- Cox in 2018
- Other name: OMFGcata
- Occupations: YouTuber, entertainer, comedian, producer, video game commentator
- Years active: 2011–present
- Awards: "YouTube - Upcoming Personality of the Year", Golden Joystick Awards, 2016.

Jesse Cox is an American YouTube gaming personality, comedian, voice actor, media commentator and video game producer. He is the owner of the YouTube channel previously named OMFGcata, a gaming channel on which Cox posts most of his content. As of February 2024, the channel has over 1,000,000 subscribers.

== Biography ==
Cox is named after his great-grandfather Jesse.

== Career ==
=== YouTube ===
Jesse Cox's YouTube channel (formerly known as "OMFGCata") serves as his primary content platform. The original name of the channel was inspired by the Cataclysm expansion of World of Warcraft, the coverage of which was one of Cox's first major video series. After the initial release of Cataclysm, Jesse expanded his coverage into "Let's Play" style gaming videos and eventually into a weekly "show" format featuring friends and colleagues. In 2016, he won a Golden Joystick Award for upcoming YouTube personality. The gaming convention Coxcon was named after Cox.

In 2016, it was announced that Cox and Michele Morrow were co-creating in a YouTube Red series, Good Game, about a fledgling eSports team starring Cox. It aired in 2017, and was generally praised by critics, but was cancelled in 2018 after one season due to low viewership. Cox was signed to Creative Artists Agency in 2020.

=== Web series ===
From 2019-2020, Jesse Cox hosted the comedy web series The Gentlemen's Hentai Club alongside Michael Santell. The series was a parody commentary show which reviewed different Japanese hentai anime series in a comedic manner, beginning with La Blue Girl. The series ran for two seasons before ending. Originally hosted on Vimeo and Fakku, the series was removed from Vimeo and dropped by Fakku in 2021, leading a fan to upload the entire series to Archive.org.

=== Voice acting ===
Cox has voiced several video game characters such as Spriticus in Heroes of Newerth, Genji in Awesomenauts, and an ice troll named Jesse in The Witcher 3: Wild Hunt, Doug Campbell (a dungeon slime-inspired dateable character) in Monster Prom 4: Monster Con, as well as a quest-giving character in Cyberpunk 2077, named Jesse Johnson, also known as "Flaming Crotch Man."

=== Podcasts ===
Cox co-hosted the Co-Optional Podcast alongside his friends Brooke "Dodger" Thorne and John "TotalBiscuit" Bain (prior to his passing in 2018). After Bain's death, the podcast was hosted by his wife, Genna Bain. The last episode of the podcast, Episode 257, aired on Genna Bain's YouTube channel in October 2019. The gaming Podcast was hosted every week, usually with a fourth special guest, or their friend Eric "Crendor" Hraab in a heavily recurring role. While the podcast's main focus was about video games, they commonly derail and discuss other topics of the day, giving way to the joke "We do occasionally talk about video games".

In November 2012, Cox and Hraab launched the "Cox 'n' Crendor Podcast", an initially daily, and later weekly, series that serves as a parody of a daily news show. Cox and Hraab discuss one another's personal and professional lives, poke fun at entertaining news stories, and do humorous reports on traffic, sports, and weather, the latter of which utilizes the hometowns of viewers. As of February 2024, the Cox'n'Crendor Podcast YouTube channel has more than 77,000 subscribers.

Jesse is also a part of the "Chilluminati Podcast" a podcast about paranormal happenings and true crime, which he hosts alongside friends and fellow YouTubers Alex Faciane and Mike 'Mathis'.

In November 2023, Cox and Thorne launched a new podcast, The Geekenders, which follows a format similar to that of the Co-Optional Podcast. The show features Cox, Thorne, and usually a guest or two, or Hraab in another heavily recurring role, engaging in discussions about game news, sharing personal stories, and exploring general topics.

=== Video game development ===
Cox also works in game development primarily as a producer, with his first project being the dating sim, Monster Prom, that was released in 2018. In 2023, together with Airdorf Games and starring TikToker Molly Moonn, he announced the point-and-click adventure game, Excuse Me Sir, alongside a demo. His next project called, Gestalt: Steam & Cinder, is a side-scrolling action RPG which he worked on as an executive producer alongside his The Geekenders Podcast co-host, Dodger. The game was initially set for release on May 21, 2024. It subsequently got delayed to July 16, 2024, and released on that day.

== CoxCon ==
CoxCon was a video game and content creator convention, hosted by Cox and held annually in Telford, United Kingdom from 2015 to 2019. The convention featured game exhibitors, vendors, board gaming, and most prominently internet celebrity guests in various panels over the course of two days. Most of the artwork featured in Coxcon's promotional material was created by Daniel "Supardanil" Tan, animator of "Cox n' Crendor Animated!".

Year	Guests
2015	Brooke "Dodger" Thorne, Sam "Strippin" Thorne, Eric "Crendor" Hraab, John "TotalBiscuit" Bain, Genna Bain
2016	John "TotalBiscuit" Bain, Genna Bain, Jirard "The Completionist" Khalil, Alex Faciane, Michael Davis, Eric "Crendor" Hraab
2017	Brooke "Dodger" Thorne, Sam "Strippin" Thorne, Angi Viper, John "TotalBiscuit" Bain, Genna Bain, Jirard "The Completionist" Khalil, Alex Faciane, Michael Davis, Kellie "PokeKellz", Daniel "Nerd³" Hardcastle, Chris "Sips" Lovasz
2018	Jirard "The Completionist" Khalil, Alex Faciane, Michael Davis, David "Lasercorn" Moss, Matthew Sohinki, Pamela Horton, Amie "misshabit" Lynn, Paul Ritchey, Josh Henderson, Nick Murphy, Jared "ProJared" Knabenbauer, Heidi O'Ferrall, Shane Gill, Satchell Drakes, Daniel "Supardanil" Tan
2019	Chris "Sips" Lovasz, Stuart Ashen, Mike "MathasGames" Martin, Jirard "The Completionist" Khalil, Alex Faciane, Michael Davis, Angi Viper, Daniel "Nerd³" Hardcastle, Steve "Dad³" Hardcastle, Rebecca Maughan, Daniel "Supardanil" Tan, Thomas "Tomska" Ridgewell
