= Alleria Windrunner =

- Warcraft character
- Concept artwork of Alleria Windrunner for World of Warcraft: The War Within.
- First game: Warcraft II: Beyond the Dark Portal (1996)
- Voiced by: Michele Morrow (Hearthstone, 2015); Mara Junot (World of Warcraft)

In-universe information
- Species: Void infused high elf
- Occupation: Ranger
- Affiliation: Alliance
- Significant other: Turalyon
- Children: Arator
- Relatives: Sylvanas Windrunner (sister); Vereesa Windrunner (sister); Lirath Windrunner (brother)

Alleria Windrunner is a fictional character in Blizzard Entertainment's Warcraft franchise. Introduced in the 1996 video game Warcraft II: Beyond the Dark Portal, she is a high elven ranger who fights for The Alliance and later acquires the powers of the Void, becoming the first void elf. She is the sister of Sylvanas and Vereesa Windrunner, the partner of the human paladin Turalyon, and the mother of their son Arator.

Alleria became an alternate playable hero in Hearthstone in 2015 and returned to the series narrative in World of Warcraft: Legion in 2017. She is a principal character in the 2024 expansion World of Warcraft: The War Within, in which she pursues the Void entity Xal'atath. Her relationship with her family is also addressed in the 2025 novel Blood Ties and the 2026 expansion World of Warcraft: Midnight. Michele Morrow voiced her 2015 Hearthstone appearance, and Mara Junot voices her in World of Warcraft. Critical commentary has addressed her redesigned appearance, the delivery of her dialogue, and romantic fan interpretations of her antagonistic relationship with Xal'atath.

== Concept and development ==
Alleria was introduced in the 1996 expansion Warcraft II: Beyond the Dark Portal. The game's manual presents her as an elven ranger who hates orcs after their devastation of Quel'Thalas, where she searched for her family's remains. She commands an elite group of rangers hunting survivors of the Bleeding Hollow clan.

Michele Morrow auditioned to voice Alleria in Hearthstone and said that Blizzard changed how it wanted the character to sound several times. Morrow described Alleria as rebellious, confident, hostile to orcs, and an expert archer. She sought to retain the regal bearing of a high elf but give the performance the grit she associated with Alleria's personality. Alleria's World of Warcraft voice is performed by Mara Junot.

Before reintroducing Alleria in Legion's patch 7.3, Blizzard's historians traced references to her in earlier games, novels, and short stories. Game director Ion Hazzikostas vited her return as an example of the team's work to keep new stories consistent with previously published material. Her storyline on Argus also contributed to the development of playable void elves. In a 2019 interview, senior narrative designer Steve Danuser explained that Blizzard wanted allied races to introduce unfamiliar ideas. The team regarded Alleria's story as an opportunity to develop another kind of elf.

Ahead of The War Within, Blizzard released Alleria: Light and Shadow in August 2024. The company's first fully 2D-animated short film recounts her decisions to leave her homeland, travel beyond the Dark Portal, and use the Void. Mike Tyler directed the film, which was produced by Sun Creature. Tyler described working with an international team on a short production schedule, with Blizzard helping to check the accuracy of its treatment of Warcraft history.

== Appearances ==
Within the series' fiction, Alleria is a high elven ranger from Quel'Thalas and the sister of Sylvanas and Vereesa Windrunner. She joins the Alliance during the Second War, develops a relationship with Turalyon, and gives birth to their son Arator. After orcs kill her brother Lirath and other relatives, she devotes herself to revenge. In Beyond the Dark Portal, she helps lead the Alliance Expedition to the orcs' world, Draenor. The expedition becomes stranded when Khadgar closes the portal to protect Azeroth from Draenor's destruction.

Alleria was absent from subsequent games for years, although World of Warcraft commemorated her with a statue and a settlement bearing her name. In 2015, Blizzard announced her as a purchasable alternate hero for the Hunter class in Hearthstone. She appears in World of Warcraft during Legion's patch 7.3 in 2017. During their absence, she and Turalyon have joined the Army of the Light in its war against the demonic Burning Legion. They experience a thousand years of warfare, although only decades pass on Azeroth. Alleria absorbs the power of the dark naaru L'ura and becomes the first void elf. Her new powers expose her to corruptive whispers.

In The War Within, Alleria pursues Xal'atath, a Void entity threatening Azeroth. Her use of the Void strains her relationship with Turalyon, who draws his powers from the opposing force, the Light. In Midnight, she accompanies Turalyon and Arator in an assault on Xal'atath's stronghold, the Voidspire. The expansion also explores Arator's relationships with his parents and the Light.

Alleria's history with Turalyon is recounted in 2017's A Thousand Years of War, a three-part audio drama written by Robert Brooks. Delilah S. Dawson wrote the 2024 short story "A Whisper of Warning", in which Alleria visits Arator before departing on a mission for Khadgar. Dawson also wrote Seasons, a 2024 comic drawn by Suheb Zako about Alleria's reunion with her former comrades during the Feast of Winter Veil. In Christie Golden's 2025 novel Blood Ties, Alleria and Turalyon accompany Arator to investigate activity at an abandoned Legion base and attempt to rebuild their relationship with him.

== Reception ==
Prior to Alleria's return to the series in 2017, Matthew Rossi of WoW Insider speculated that she could play a role in the future of the series by becoming either a peacemaker or an advocate for further war. Her appearance in promotional material for The War Within prompted a discussion of her redesign by Phil Xavier of Blizzard Watch. He identified three changes: the removal of her eye marking, the replacement of her green ranger clothing with white and grey, and a different hairstyle. Xavier considered the design acceptable in itself but argued that these changes together made her difficult to recognize. He wrote that some players had mistaken her for Vereesa and suggested that retaining green in her costume would have preserved more of her earlier appearance.

Harvey Randall of PC Gamer welcomed the conversation between Alleria and Khadgar in the Dark Heart cinematic released before The War Within. He contrasted its pauses, expressions, and conversational delivery with what he regarded as the slow, grandiose dialogue of earlier cinematics. Randall thought the scene made the characters sound more like people and conveyed their relationship through performance rather than exposition. Reviewing the expansion for GameSpot, Cameron Koch welcomed its attention to the personal journeys of Alleria, Anduin Wrynn, and Magni Bronzebeard. He singled out an optional reunion between Alleria and her partner as one of its memorable scenes. Koch wrote that these additional conversations encouraged him to listen to the characters and increased his investment in them.

Cass Marshall of Polygon described Alleria's antagonism with Xal'atath as "gay as hell" and discussed the desire from some quarters in the Warcraft fandom of a romantic pairing between them. Marshall considered Xal'atath's recruitment attempts unconvincing because Alleria had little reason to accept them. Marshall noted fans' interest in the characters' relationship but doubted that Blizzard would ever make such a pairing canonical.

Marshall also praised the visual style and clarity of Alleria: Light and Shadow as an introduction to the character's history. The film received a bronze award in the Games: Branded Entertainment & Content—Film category at the 2024 Clio Entertainment Awards.

Reviewing Blood Ties for The Cosmic Circus, Luna Gauthier described Alleria's alternation between affection and distance as unsettling for Arator. Gauthier regarded the novel as a family drama in which he must reconcile his image of his parents as heroes with their flaws. She enjoyed that story but thought its reliance on existing Warcraft lore made it less accessible to unfamiliar readers.
