= The Seer (film) =

- Directed by: Luigi Desole
- Written by: Luca Pesaro; Noelle Siri
- Starring: Michele Morrow; Bella Thorne; Alexander Fiske-Harrison; Katia Winter; Domiziano Arcangeli; Paul Marc Davis; Lisa Franks; Michael Graves
- Distributed by: Nuragic Films
- Release date: 6 September 2007
- Running time: 120 minutes
- Country: Italy
- Language: English
- Budget: $180.000

The Seer is an Italian thriller and horror film directed by Luigi Desole and written by Luca Pesaro and Noelle Siri. It stars Michele Morrow, Bella Thorne, Alexander Fiske-Harrison, Katia Winter, Domiziano Arcangeli, Paul Marc Davis, Lisa Franks and Michael Graves. The film was released on September 6, 2007. It was filmed in Sardinia, Italy.

== Synopsis ==
Claire Sue (Michele Morrow) travels to an island in the Mediterranean. The island is home by a bloodthirsty and a dangerous sect who prepare to wake an ancient power that threatens to destroy mankind. They begin a hunt to find the missing key that will awaken their God, the heiress and descendant of the immortal, Claire.

== Cast ==
- Michele Morrow as Claire Sue
  - Bella Thorne as Young Claire Sue
- Alexander Fiske-Harrison as Paolo Lazzari
- Katia Winter as Ada
- Domiziano Arcangeli as Lupo
- Paul Marc Davis as Adam
- Lisa Franks as Francesca Sue
- Michael Graves as Professor Giusti
- Ashlie Victoria Clark as Sheila
- Irena A. Hoffman as Agata
- Paul di Rollo as Luigi Bronzetti
- Amanda Fullerton as Magistrate Bianchi
- Richard Kinsey as Sergio Sue
- Emilio Roso as Michele Sue
- Marco Spiga as Bassano / Curator Soru
- Zondra Wilson as Dr. Blake
