= Good Game (2017 TV series) =

American YouTube Red series

- Genre: Comedy
- Created by: Jesse Cox; Michele Morrow
- Written by: Sarah Carbiener; Erica Rosbe
- Directed by: Danny Jelinek
- Starring: Dan Avidan; Arin Hanson; Michele Morrow; Jade Payton; Rahul Abburi; Michael Ornstein
- Composer: Ryan Elder
- Country of origin: United States
- Original language: English
- No. of episodes: 6

Production
- Executive producers: Arin Hanson; Brent Lilley; Steve Levy; Jen Roskind; Michael Waldron; Sarah Carbiener; Erica Rosbe; Jesse Cox; Michele Morrow; Dan Harmon
- Cinematography: Andrew Knapp
- Editors: Andy Maxwell; Chris Poole
- Running time: 25 minutes
- Production company: Starburns Industries

Original release
- Network: YouTube Red
- Release: August 30 – September 27, 2017

Good Game is an American comedy series, developed by Michele Morrow and Jesse Cox, that premiered on August 30, 2017, on YouTube Red.

In March 2018, it was announced that the show had been cancelled after one season due to low viewership, despite receiving mostly favorable reviews.

== Premise ==
Good Game follows "a newly formed team of eSports players trying to make it to the top in the cutthroat world of competitive gaming."

== Cast and characters ==
- Dan Avidan as Alex Taylor, the optimistic coach of the team and Ryland's roommate
- Arin Hanson as Ryland Tate, a former DotA legend who tries to hide his embarrassing past
- Michele Morrow as Ashley "Ash" Donovan, a video game reporter who relishes the chance to compete
- Jade Payton as Samantha "Sam" Kinsey, a former Olympic tennis hopeful who began playing Killcore during rehabilitation from an injury
- Rahul Abburi as Kamal Pasala, an obnoxious but vital part of the team.
- Michael Ornstein as Lorenzo Santella Jr., Alex and Ryland's landlord and source of the team's funding
- Oliver Cooper as "SteaminSemen", Ryland's adversary
- Jesse Cox as Jesse Newman, the mysterious creator of Killcore
- Terry Crews as himself
- Dan Harmon as The Suit
- Brian Wecht as Assassin / Mystery Man
- Josh Fadem as Panda
- Marion Van Cuyck as Katie
- Sky Elobar as Merle

== Production ==
=== Development ===
On June 22, 2017, it was announced during YouTube Red's presentation at VidCon that they had given the production a series order. The series was developed by Michele Morrow and Jesse Cox, executive produced by Dan Harmon, and expected to be showrun by Sarah Carbiener and Erica Rosbe. Production companies involved with the series were expected to consist of Starburns Industries.

=== Cancellation ===
On March 25, 2018, Morrow announced through her official Twitter account that the show had been cancelled after one season due to low viewership.

=== Casting ===
Alongside the initial series announcement, it was confirmed that the series would star Arin Hanson, Dan Avidan, and Michele Morrow.

== Release ==
On August 3, 2017, the official trailer for the series was released.

== Episodes ==
No.	Title	Directed by	Written by	Original release date
1	"The Return of Boogerboss"	Danny Jelinek	Sarah Carbiener & Erica Rosbe	August 30, 2017
2	"Everybody Calls Everybody a Nazi"	Danny Jelinek	Sarah Carbiener & Erica Rosbe	August 30, 2017
3	"Self Abuse (Not the Fun Kind)"	Danny Jelinek	Sarah Carbiener & Erica Rosbe	September 6, 2017
4	"Don't Cross the Streams"	Danny Jelinek	Sarah Carbiener & Erica Rosbe	September 13, 2017
5	"You Stab My Back I'll Stab Yours"	Danny Jelinek	Sarah Carbiener & Erica Rosbe	September 20, 2017
6	"Blood Match"	Danny Jelinek	Sarah Carbiener & Erica Rosbe	September 27, 2017

== Reception ==
In a positive review, Heavy's Jack Fennimore commended the series saying, "Good Game so far has me impressed. This was clearly a show made by game players, for game players, which is a rarity in most entertainment media. It also made me care about my YouTube Red subscription. And if you have a subscription, I definitely recommend checking the show out. It's going in a good direction and I can't wait to see what happens to eSports People." In another favorable critique, Fandom's Drew Dietsch praised the series saying, "The plot itself is a little threadbare, but it clearly gives Arin and Dan a chance to showcase their unique comedic chops. Game Grumps is known for its off-the-cuff ridiculousness, so it's great that energy has been channeled into something structured. Creators Jesse Cox and Michele Morrow have done an excellent job in having their stars fit the material." In a more mixed assessment, Cultured Vultures' Katrina Bertz described the series as "a poorly-crafted show with a profound message of individual happiness within. I would suggest watching this show with the knowledge that it won't be good, but its theme will tug at your heartstrings. Just try to overcome your initial confusion and discover something wonderful."
