= White Hot (film) =

- Directed by: Robby Benson
- Written by: Robert Madero
- Produced by: Fred Berner; Jubran Jubran
- Starring: Robby Benson; Tawny Kitaen; Danny Aiello
- Cinematography: Neil Smith
- Edited by: Craig McKay; Alan Miller
- Music by: Nile Rodgers
- Production companies: Rebo High Definition Studio; The Jubran Group
- Distributed by: Paul Entertainment
- Release dates: 13 May 1988 (Cannes Film Festival Market); 3 February 1989 (US)
- Running time: 95 minutes
- Country: United States
- Language: English

White Hot is a 1988 American crime drama film directed by Robby Benson, starring Benson and Tawny Kitaen.

== Plot ==
Scott, young man, short of money, is persuaded into looking after the business of a local drug dealer Butchie for a week or two. Up until then, the guy had been an honest and clean of drugs, but when he spends his days surrounded by riches and drugs, he cannot resist... and neither can his addict wife.

== Cast ==
- Robby Benson as Scott
- Tawny Kitaen as Vanessa
- Danny Aiello as Charlie Buick
- Kevin Gray as Butchie
- Cliff Bemis as Dwayne
- Tony Gillan as Angelo
- Paul Herman as Vinnie
- Tony Sirico as Luke
- Michael Marisi Ornstein as Carlos
- Anna Thomson as Heather
- Judy Tenuta as Singer 1
- Sally Kirkland as Harriet
- Mark Margolis as The Tin Man
- Terri Hawkes as Christine
- Joe Lisi as Broker 1
- Mike Starr as Chauffeur 1
- Antonia Rey as Market Woman

== Release ==
The film opened at a theatre in Nashville, Tennessee on 3 February 1989. It was released on video the following month.

== Reception ==
Mike Mayo of The Roanoke Times praised the "excellent" supporting cast and the "realistic" script. However, he criticised the ending, writing that it "undercuts the body of the film." Mike Pearson of the Scripps Howard News Service wrote that the film "covers such familiar terrain that it's scarcely satisfying."

The Video Librarian gave the film a negative review but praised Aiello's performance. Mike McInally of the Missoulian wrote a negative review of the film, calling it "dreary and chaotic". The New York Daily News wrote that "90 minutes of Robby B. ultimately adds up to a braincell-threatening video OD."
