= Michael Marisi Ornstein =

American actor and painter

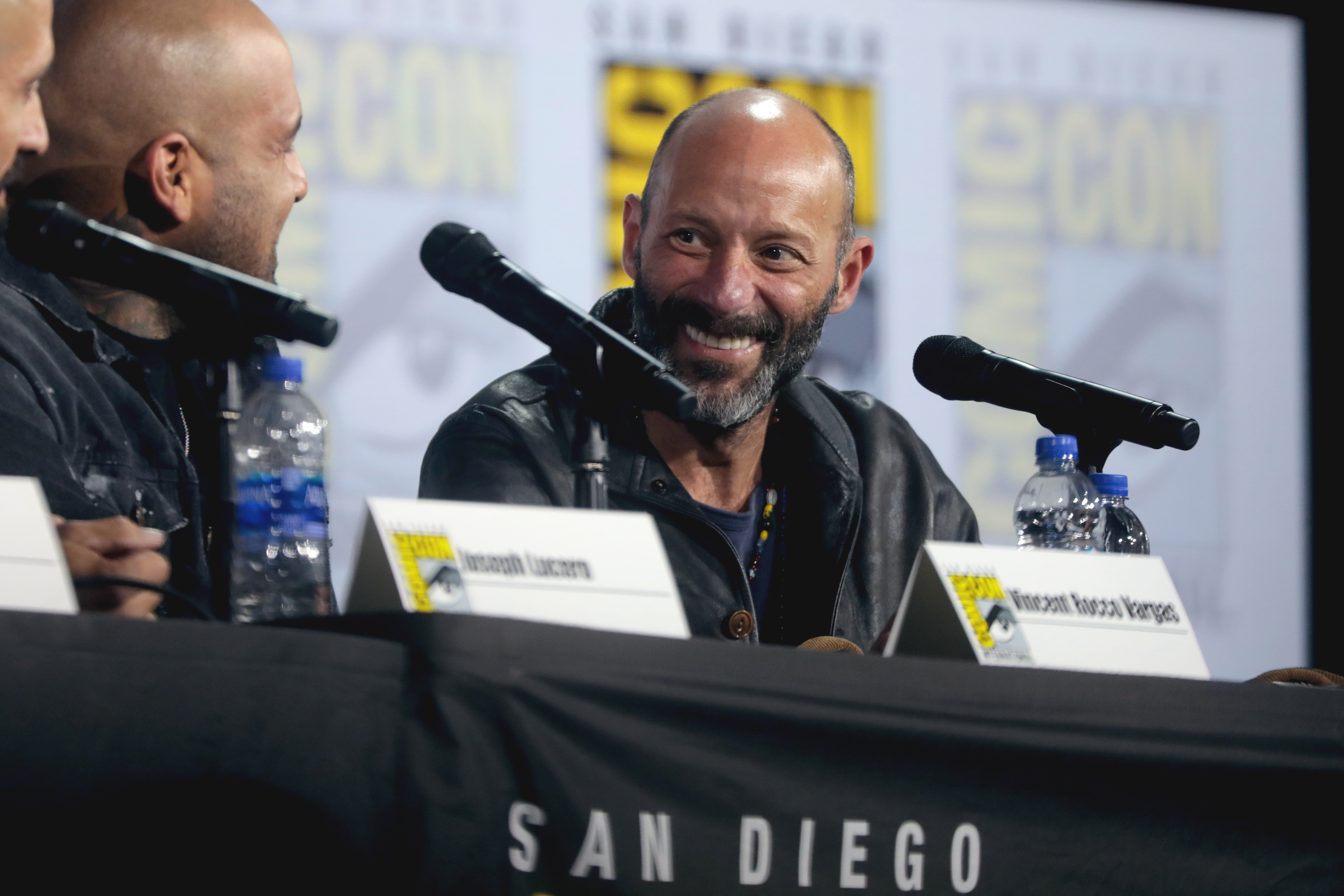
- Born: 1963 (age 62–63); Passaic, New Jersey, United States
- Spouse(s): Zoe (2005–present)
- Children: 2
- Website: http://www.michaelornstein.com/

Michael Marisi Ornstein (born 1963) is an American actor. He is best known for his recurring role as Chucky Marstein on Sons of Anarchy (2008–2014) and its spin-off Mayans M.C. (2019–2023).

== Early life ==
Ornstein studied acting as a child at the American Academy of Dramatic Arts in New York City, and later studied under Stella Adler. After high school, he enrolled in the Mason Gross School of the Arts. He quit after his first year and moved to New York City to begin working professionally.

== Career ==
Ornstein's first film credit was for Crossing Delancey, in which he played the minor character Mickey. Television credits include a recurring role as Detective Bonnaventura in Homicide: Life on the Street, and a two-episode arc in Third Watch, as well as parts in Seinfeld, Law & Order, Law & Order: Special Victims Unit, and Law & Order: Criminal Intent.

Ornstein's stage acting credits span twenty-five years' worth of new plays in New York City, in addition to creating the role of Louis Ironson in the 1991 World Premiere of Angels in America at the Eureka Theater in San Francisco.

Ornstein played Chuck "Chucky" Marstein on Sons of Anarchy (2008–2014) and played him on its spin-off Mayans M.C. (2018–2019).

== Credits ==
Key
†	Denotes works that have not yet been released

=== Film ===
Year	Title	Role	Notes
1988	White Hot	Carlos	
1988	Crossing Delancey	Mickey	
1995	Man of The Year	Mike Miller	
1996	Kansas City	Jackie Ciro	
1998	The Book of Life	Computer Wizard	
1999	Let It Snow	Lenny Ellis	
2022	Chickenhare and the Hamster of Darkness	Aide / Big Oxe	Voice role

=== Television ===
Year	Title	Role	Notes
1993	Blindsided	Det. Sartucci	TV movie
1993	Seinfeld	Waiter	Episode: "The Shoes"
1998	New York Undercover	Perkins	Episode: "Mob Street"
1998–1999	Homicide: Life on the Street	Det. Tommy Bonnaventura	2 episodes
2000	Law & Order: Special Victims Unit	Harvey Dennis	Episode: "Limitations"
2000–2005	Law & Order	Sklar / Eugene Miller	2 episodes
2001–2008	Law & Order: Criminal Intent	Florist / Phillip / Howard	3 episodes
2008–2014	Sons of Anarchy	Chuck "Chucky" Marstein	Recurring role; 46 episodes
2009	NCIS: Los Angeles	Frank Davis	Episode: "Killshot"
2013	Mob City	Ray Berman	2 episodes
2018–2019	Mayans M.C.	Chuck "Chucky" Marstein	Recurring role (seasons 1–2)
TBA	† The Abandons	TBA	In Production

=== Web series ===
Year	Title	Role	Notes
2017	Good Game	Lorenzo Santella Jr.	
2017	Guest Grumps	Himself	Episode: "Gauntlet II with Michael Ornstein"
