= Michele Morrow =

American television presenter and actress (born 1978)

- Born: March 19, 1978 (age 48); Spokane, Washington, U.S.
- Occupations: Television presenter, actress, writer, video game journalist and producer
- Years active: 2004–present
- Spouse: Michael Weitzman (m. 2017)
- Website: michelemorrow.com

Michele Morrow (born March 19, 1978) is an American television presenter, host, actress, writer, producer and video game personality. She is the co-creator, executive producer and lead actor of the single camera sitcom, Good Game, a YouTube Original with Dan Harmon's Starburns Industries and Game Grumps, and is the voice over artist for Alleria Windrunner in Hearthstone.

== Early life ==
Morrow was born in Spokane, Washington. In 1996, she attended Western Washington University before transferring to University of Washington where she obtained a Bachelor of Arts degree in Drama and minor in Speech Communication. After graduating college she moved to Los Angeles, California, where she continued to study acting at Howard Fine Acting Studio, Ivana Chubbuck Studio, Lesly Kahn and Co. and The Second City.

== Career ==
Performing first in independent films before making her television hosting debut on DirecTV for Blizzard Entertainment's BlizzCon in 2014, she has since appeared as host of ESPN2's live broadcast of Heroes of the Dorm, daily news host for Bleacher Report's esports show, and on the live broadcast team for ELEAGUE on TBS.

=== 2004–2018: Acting ===
Morrow made her film debut in the independent horror film Slaughterhouse of the Rising Sun (2005), based on the Manson Family. In 2005, Morrow made television guest appearances in The Young and the Restless and Alias. In 2007, Morrow starred in horror film The Seer (2007) shot on location in Sardinia, Italy co-starring Bella Thorne as young Claire. In 2009, Michele co-starred in vampire thriller Bled. She next starred as the final girl in horror slasher Basement Jack (2009), co-starring Billy Morrison and Lynn Lowry. In 2010, Morrow played a supporting role in Ashley's Ashes, starring Clint Howard, Willie Garson, and Daniel Baldwin. In 2014, she appeared as a guest star in the Syfy reality television series Heroes of Cosplay. In 2015, Morrow was cast as the voice actor for Alleria Windrunner in Hearthstone, and appeared as herself in video game documentary series Unlocked: The World of Games Revealed (2015) with Sean Astin.

In 2017, Morrow appeared as Ash in the 6-episode comedy series for YouTube Originals, Good Game.

=== 2012–2023: Esports and gaming ===
Since 2012, Morrow has attended the annual video game convention and trade fair E3 as a video game journalist and host. She has been a guest on Geoff Keighley's Live at E3 from 2015 through 2018, and appeared as panel moderator at the 2017 E3 Coliseum for God of War: Behind the Curtain where she interviewed the team from God of War.

From 2014 through 2016, Morrow appeared as host of DirecTV's coverage of Blizzard Entertainment's BlizzCon, and continued in the position through 2019 on Blizzard's All Access Channel. Morrow then served as stage host for ESPN's Heroes of the Dorm at the Shrine Auditorium in downtown Los Angeles in 2015, which aired live on ESPN2, marking the first-ever esport to be broadcast on a major American television network. ESPN sports journalist Colin Cowherd made defamatory remarks regarding competitive video games, causing controversy in sports and gaming.

In 2015, Morrow competed as a gamer for the first time at the Heroes of the Storm launch event, Mayhem Begins.

In 2016, Morrow joined Bleacher Report's daily esports news show, Estream, with co-host Malik Forté. Filming took place at the CNN building in Los Angeles where Morrow and Forté reported on all aspects of competitive gaming with pro gamers and professional athletes. That same year, Morrow served as executive producer and host of Endgame, a weekly video game culture show for Lionsgate in partnership with Comic-Con for subscription service CCHQ, with co-host Khail Anonymous and executive producers Adam Sessler and Neil Mandt. Later in 2016, Morrow appeared on HLN as a tech expert for MichaeLA hosted by Michaela Pereira, where they demonstrated the Oculus Rift. Morrow also appeared as a video game expert for Dr. Drew on Call hosted by Drew Pinsky, and in 2017 appeared as guest star for Geek & Sundry's Tabletop with Wil Wheaton.

In 2018, Morrow joined the broadcast team at TBS's ELEAGUE as sideline reporter for the four-part tournament miniseries Tekken Team Takedown. The show aired on TBS every Friday night, from March 16 through April 6. Later in 2018, Morrow returned to TBS and ELEAGUE as desk host for the ELEAGUE Street Fighter V Invitational 2018 which aired Fridays starting May 25 for six weeks.

In 2018 and 2019, Morrow hosted two seasons of weekly video game clip show Game Over with Bud Light for Amazon and Twitch. Morrow has appeared as guest host for AT&T's esports news show, The 9's Presented by AT&T (2019) with host Christopher "Monte Cristo" Mykles.

In 2020, Morrow launched video game podcast, The Game Diaries, with professional gamer Stephanie "missharvey" Harvey.

=== 2014–2019: BlizzCon ===
For six years, Morrow served as host and desk anchor of Blizzard Entertainment's annual video game convention BlizzCon (2014–2019). In 2014, Morrow hosted BlizzCon November 7 and 8 which appeared on DirectTV with co-host Geoff Keighley, musical act Metallica, and comedian Chris Hardwick. In 2015, during Blizzard Entertainment's 25th anniversary, Morrow returned to host BlizzCon on November 6 and 7 which appeared on DirectTV with co-host Alex Albrecht, musical act Linkin Park, and master of ceremonies Wil Wheaton. In 2016, Morrow again hosted BlizzCon with Albrecht on November 4 and 5 which appeared on DirectTV with musical act "Weird Al" Yankovic and master of ceremonies Thomas Middleditch. In 2017, Morrow and Albrecht returned as co-hosts for BlizzCon on November 3 and 4 which appeared on Blizzard's new All Access Channel with musical guest Muse and comedian Chris Hardwick. Morrow and Albrecht also served as stage hosts for closing ceremonies where they interviewed Blizzard Entertainment's three original co-founders, Mike Morhaime, Frank Pearce and Allen Adham. In 2018, Morrow and Albrecht returned as co-hosts for BlizzCon on November 2 and 3 which appeared on the BlizzCon All Access Channel with musical guests Train, Lindsey Stirling, and DJ Kristian Nairn. In 2019, Morrow returned to host BlizzCon on November 1 and 2 which appeared on the BlizzCon All Access Channel with co-host Malik Forté and musical guests Fitz and the Tantrums, The Glitch Mob, and Haywyre.

=== 2015–2018: Good Game ===
Morrow and Cox conceived of and wrote the treatment for Good Game in 2015. Spoofing MOBA genre games DOTA 2 and League of Legends, they designed and created Killcore, a comedic, fictional game featured in the series. Concept artist Mark Gibbons of Blizzard Entertainment, Games Workshop and Riot Games, illustrated Killcore's character design, environment, user interface and logo. In 2016, Morrow and Cox made a deal to develop and executive produce Good Game as a six-part series for YouTube Originals with Dan Harmon's Starburns Industries and YouTube channel Game Grumps. The project was announced at VidCon 2017 by YouTube CEO Susan Wojcicki. In 2017, filming took place in Los Angeles, California with an ensemble cast starring Arin Hanson, Dan Avidan, Michele Morrow, Jade Payton, Rahul Abburi and Michael Marisi Ornstein; co-starring Oliver Cooper, Terry Crews and Stephanie Harvey, who appeared as a cameo with the esports organization Counter Logic Gaming. Good Game premiered on YouTube Red August 30, 2017, in five countries (United States, Mexico, South Korea, Australia, and New Zealand), and on Google Play.

In 2018, Good Game was recognized as a finalist for "Best Esports-Themed Program" during the 1st annual Tempest Awards.

=== Web series & digital media ===
From 2009 to 2011, Morrow created and developed Foam Weapon League where she performed as team captain at three live events in Los Angeles.

Early in her career she was a freelance writer and columnist for HelloGiggles and Nerdist Industries, while also hosting various digital shows centered around video games and pop culture. From 2012 to 2015, Morrow hosted, wrote and produced several shows for digital network BiteSize TV.

From 2013 through 2017, Morrow was a writer and talent for Nerdist Industries including weekly shows The Doctor Who Companion and Massive. In 2014, Morrow made a guest appearance in Controller Freaks by co-presentation by Nerdist and Upright Citizen's Brigade. From 2014 to 2015, Morrow hosted a weekly show on Sling TV for Maker Studios called Multiplayer, and guest starred on Sling TV's tabletop gaming show Table Flip with Arin "Egoraptor" Hansen and Nathan Barnatt.

In 2015, Morrow appeared at San Diego Comic-Con for Legendary Entertainment where she interviewed the cast and director of the Warcraft movie, later hosting the red carpet premiere of Warcraft by Universal Pictures at Grauman's Chinese Theatre in Hollywood, California. Later that same year, Morrow presented the award for best short film with Dante Bosco at the Geekie Awards.

In 2016, Morrow hosted Super-Fan Builds for Defy Media with co-hosts Sandeep Parikh and Leah Kilpatrick, appearing on Verizon Go90 and Netflix.

== Personal life ==
Morrow currently lives in Los Angeles, California with her husband, Michael Weitzman, and their cats Samus, Zeus and Neptune. Morrow is an accomplished artist, who has created original works of multimedia art under the name "Recycled Rock". Her commissioned pieces have been featured inside the offices of Ryan Seacrest in Los Angeles and Billboard New York City. Morrow's favorite games include Myst, The Legend of Zelda, Hearthstone, God of War II, World of Warcraft, Portal 2, Overwatch and Borderlands 2. Morrow created Moon Time Planner during the pandemic in 2021.

=== Charity work ===
Morrow served as spokesperson for GameChanger Charity in 2015 and led an event called "Raid Against Rare Diseases" which featured popular Twitch streamers and raised approximately $10,000. In 2015, Morrow played in a gaming tournament held in Orlando, Florida benefiting Extra Life United. She has also supported Child's Play and is an AnyKey Affiliate.
