= Sylvanas Windrunner =

Character in Warcraft series of video games

- Warcraft character
- Sylvanas from Heroes of the Storm
- First appearance: Warcraft III: Reign of Chaos (2002)
- Voiced by: Piera Coppola (WC3); Patty Mattson (WoW and Heroes of the Storm)

In-universe information
- Race: High Elf (later Forsaken)
- Affiliation: The Horde
- Relatives: Alleria Windrunner (sister); Vereesa Windrunner (sister); Lirath Windrunner (brother); Turalyon (brother-in-law); Arator (nephew)

Sylvanas Windrunner is a fictional character who appears in the Warcraft series of video games by Blizzard Entertainment. Originally introduced in Warcraft III: Reign of Chaos, she received a dramatic redesign in World of Warcraft: Wrath of the Lich King, followed by a minor redesign in World of Warcraft: Legion. Once a high elf ranger-general of Silvermoon, Sylvanas was murdered by Arthas Menethil when she led a doomed resistance against his invasion. In one climactic battle, that left the capital city of Silvermoon in ruins, he managed to finally beat the elven general, ripping her soul out and transforming her into a banshee.

Sylvanas also appears as a playable character in the crossover multiplayer online battle arena game Heroes of the Storm. The character has been voiced by Patty Mattson since World of Warcraft patch 3.2 but prior to that she was voiced by Piera Coppola.

Sylvanas has become one of the most iconic and noted characters in Warcraft lore, and received generally positive critical reception from players and journalists alike before World of Warcraft: Legion, after which her character development was increasingly criticized. Before that, she was often praised for being a capable military leader and at the same time a sympathetic figure in the game's narrative arcs.

== Conception and development ==
Sylvanas' character model in World of Warcraft was originally a light-skinned Night Elf. This was changed as the character was to feature in a major role in World of Warcraft: Wrath of the Lich King. Blizzard felt the need to revamp her character model, as "players [were] worried that they would have to look at the old night elf model through all her lore moments in Wrath [of the Lich King]." An initial redesign featuring a more accurate blood or high elf model was released to the Wrath of the Lich King beta in August 2008, before her final "fantastic model" was introduced a month later. In an interview with World of Warcraft developer Ion Hazzikostas, Sylvanas was referred to as a "very cool character" who isn't "out of the picture by any means." Christie Golden, writer of the Warcraft novel War Crimes, remembers that "I was thrilled when they OK'd [the Sylvanas subplot in the novel], I was like "This is going to be a blast, this is just going to be all kinds of fun to write." She also said that "I like her, I love Sylvanas, I think she is wonderfully ... she's like chocolate, dark and bittersweet." In an interview with World of Warcraft Trading Card Game developer Cryptozoic, Head Creative Designer Drew Walker stated that "MMO fans are immediately drawn to iconic figures like Tirion Fordring, Jaina Proudmoore, and Sylvanas Windrunner", which contributes to the popularity of the game.

In August 2015, Blizzard updated the website for World of Warcraft: Legion with a profile of Sylvanas featuring another redesign. The new model utilized updated textures, and most notably included a redesign to her armor which covered her midriff. A later cinematic featured the new Sylvanas. This cinematic marked her first appearance in a pre-rendered scene, an opportunity which allowed the team to "go back to [their] direction and really talk" about the character. The team focused on representing the features associated with her undead high elf appearance, highlighting her "slightly wide set of eyes, high cheekbones, and a very pointy chin," as well as adding "a little bit of chisel on her face." In addition, they also used the opportunity to redesign her classic armor in order to create "a more fitting attire" for the undead ranger, nicknaming it her "battle armor." Sylvanas' updated look sparked conversation online, with many fans debating the choice to cover her midriff, and discussing the portrayal of female characters in modern video games.

== Appearances ==
Sylvanas Windrunner is the founder and leader of the Forsaken faction. Originally a high elf of Quel'thalas, at a young age Sylvanas displayed exceptional skills at being a ranger, advancing in the ranks until eventually earning the position of Ranger-General. When the Scourge invaded Quel'thalas during the events of Warcraft III: Reign of Chaos, Sylvanas valiantly defended her homeland, delaying the Scourge while the high elves attempted to create a defense. The Scourge however eventually overwhelmed her forces, and Prince Arthas Menethil (now a death knight) killed Sylvanas himself and raised her as an incorporeal banshee in his service as punishment for hindering his invasion. Prince Arthas' master, the Lich King, gradually lost control over the undead, a result of an attack by Illidan Stormrage and his forces on the Lich King's fortress, the Frozen Throne in Northrend. Thanks to this loss of control, Sylvanas regained her free will and physical body before launching an attack on Prince Arthas. Arthas fled to Northrend, but Sylvanas chose not to pursue him just yet, instead recruiting the majority of free-willed undead under her service and renaming themselves the 'Forsaken'. She led the Forsaken to consolidate their hold over the ruins of Lordaeron by defeating the dread lords of the Burning Legion and eventually betraying the Alliance remnants within the region (whom she manipulated to help her destroy her enemies). Under their new queen's guidance, the Forsaken established the Undercity beneath the ruins of Lordaeron's capital. While some Forsaken feared Sylvanas, others valued the security she provided. Many of the free-willed undead, however, found a purpose to their cursed existence through the banshee queen's burning desire to destroy the Lich King.

Sylvanas and the Forsaken hold a tense relationship with the Horde. After fighting for their right to join the Horde, Sylvanas led her "people" to the continent of Northrend to destroy the Lich King. Before they could succeed, an uprising among the Forsaken killed members of the Horde and Alliance, casting a shadow of mistrust over Sylvanas. She came to dwell on the Forsaken's dim prospects for the future; they were despised and unable to procreate. Ultimately, the Banshee Queen made a pact with the Val'kyr, nightmarish creatures capable of creating more undead, to give the Forsaken a chance to persist on Azeroth. Although having a respect and loyalty for the founding Warchief Thrall, Sylvanas despised his successor, Garrosh Hellscream—openly supporting and obeying Hellscream in his presence, yet plotting and scheming behind his back. Her brethren ultimately joined the Horde's rebellion against Garrosh, helping to bring an end to his tyrannical rule.

After Warchief Vol'jin was mortally wounded in the invasion of the Broken Isles, Vol'jin himself named Sylvanas Windrunner as his successor as Warchief of the Horde. Sylvanas then spearheaded the Horde's assault on The Broken Isles where she traveled to Stormheim in search of an artifact that would bind the remaining Val'kyr there to her will, thus allowing her once again to create more Forsaken. However, this plan was foiled when Genn Greymane attacked her and destroyed the artifact, creating more tension between the two factions.

Sylvanas Windrunner appears as a playable character in the crossover video game Heroes of the Storm, having been introduced in a March 2015 patch during the game's closed beta. She is a ranged assassin, which trait "black arrows" can enable basic attacks and abilities to stun minions, mercenaries and towers alike. Her basic abilities include a powerful volley of arrows with charges refreshed by kills, a dagger strike that does damage over time and spreads to nearby enemies, and a cone-based area-of-effect damage spell, called "haunting wave", that also allows her to teleport. Furthermore, both her heroic abilities provide her team with sufficient crowd control either through "Mind Control", or an AoE silence by shooting the "Wailing Arrow". Talent upgrades can cause minions that die under the effects of her trait to explode, as well as to force an enemy minion to fight for Sylvanas' team using "possession" talent, or to enable Sylvanas to teleport multiple times during the short period of time using "windrunner" talent. In Heroes of the Storm, Sylvanas primarily functions as a fast-paced marksman from behind the front lines but can also initiate tactical maneuvers to "gank" the enemy or make an easy getaway, and generally focuses on pushing lanes and dominating team fights with quick thinking. Furthermore, successful execution of her skills not only provides your team with a huge killing score but makes it very difficult to counter her deceptive split pushing capabilities.

Like several Warcraft characters, Sylvanas features as a collectible card in the Warcraft spin-off game Hearthstone: Heroes of Warcraft, where she is regularly ranked as one of the most powerful cards in the game, with Engadget's Matt Low writing that "Sylvanas Windrunner is a legendary rarity card [...] her bang for the mana buck is pretty darned good." She also appears in the World of Warcraft Trading Card Game, also as a collectible card.

== Promotion and reception ==
Sylvanas has been featured in Warcraft-related merchandise. "The most powerful dead female in Azeroth" is featured on a custom Warcraft Monopoly $50 note, along with other notable Warcraft characters. A Sylvanas figurine was featured at Comic-Con 2013, with Kotaku's Mike Fahey joking that "Mini Sylvanas is the most adorable queen of the undead ever. I love her. More than you." Other Sylvanas figurines can be found too. Sylvanas is also a popular character for cosplay. Sylvanas appears as a Widowmaker skin in Overwatch 2 as part of a celebration for World of Warcraft's 20th anniversary.

The character has received mostly positive reception. Sylvanas was listed #2 on 2p.com's list of the "5 most influential female characters in World of Warcraft", where she was summed up as "one of the most tragic and legendary heroes in World of Warcraft. However, she never gave up to destiny. Sylvanas strived to get out of predicaments and became a leader of the Forsaken. She was tough, firm, valiant, and brave enough to face her own destiny." IGN editor Dana praised the story around Sylvanas, stating "I'm not ashamed to admit that I choked up more than once in the quest chain centered around Lady Sylvanas", referring to her appearance in World of Warcraft: Cataclysm. Engadget writer Zach Yonzon wrote that Sylvanas "look[ed] every bit as awesome as faction leaders should be." The character's new updated look was praised as being "more regal, more intimidating, and just more badass" as well, with plenty of admirers. Kotaku referred to her as a "crazy new character" and "rad hero" for her appearance in Heroes of the Storm; she was also later reviewed as "an absolute blast to play", with Kotaku's Mike Fahey writing "I love her, at least for now." She has also been referred to as "not your regular Heroes of the Storm character" by Nicole Arce of Tech Times.

Sylvanas was also listed #2 on Matthew Rossi of Engadget's "Top 10 magnificent bastards of Warcraft", as "Sylvanas Windrunner has clawed her way to the number two slot by basically becoming ever more ruthless and viciously pragmatic in every appearance. She's cultivated a personality that has, in turn, formed its own cult among her Forsaken followers." He also wrote that "Sylvanas is an interesting character because despite her often abominable actions, her actions make sense when related to her backstory. She's not an unknowable menace, and while you may not support what she does, you have to admit that it's hard to imagine not being as she is when she's experienced what she has." Actress Michele Morrow stated her desire to play as Sylvanas in the Warcraft film, stating "To be honest, I’d be happy to play any of the characters in the movie. But, Sylvanas… I love her because she's determined. She's insidious. She's arrogant and spiteful, but you can’t really blame her. She's very tortured. I love this imagination of her. She truly takes her own council" (sic); with an associated Facebook page receiving over 5,000 likes. However, Anne Stickney of Engadget reviewed Sylvanas more negatively, claiming "Sylvanas Windrunner? Technically dead. Obsessed with procreation. Sylvanas actually stands on her own two feet, but her story is leaning more and more away from a competent leader and more toward someone who may just be a little cuckoo for Cocoa Puffs, if you know what I mean."
