= World of Warcraft: Battle for Azeroth =

2018 expansion set for World of Warcraft

- Developer: Blizzard Entertainment
- Publisher: Blizzard Entertainment
- Directors: Ion Hazzikostas; Alex Afrasiabi; Chris Robinson
- Producers: Ray Cobo; Shani Edwards
- Designers: Matt Goss; Jeremy Feasel; Steve Burke
- Series: Warcraft
- Platforms: Microsoft Windows, macOS
- Release: August 14, 2018
- Genre: Massively multiplayer online role-playing game
- Mode: Multiplayer

World of Warcraft: Battle for Azeroth is the seventh expansion pack for the massively multiplayer online role-playing game (MMORPG) World of Warcraft, following Legion. It was announced at BlizzCon on November 3, 2017. In contrast to previous expansions, which went live at midnight in each time zone, Battle for Azeroth had a simultaneous release for all regions, corresponding to midnight Central European Summer Time on August 14, 2018.

In addition to raising the level cap from 110 to 120, the expansion introduces the Kul Tiras and Zandalar continents and four races for both the Alliance and the Horde, while also adding dungeons and raids, warfronts, and uncharted islands.

== Gameplay ==
The expansion allows players to level up to 120, an increase from the level cap of 110 in the previous expansion Legion. Initially, there will be ten dungeons included with 8.0 with Mythic Plus versions of the dungeons and the first raid, Uldir, being available soon after the game's release. Following the beginning of preorders and the release of four allied races in January 2018, the number of character slots per server was raised from 12 to 16; with the launch of the expansion in August, it was raised to 18, to make room for the two additional races unlocked with initial content. The number of available bag slots in the player's backpack, which has been fixed at 16 slots since the game's release in 2004, will also receive an increase if an authenticator is attached to an account.

=== Changes to gameplay ===
A "stat squish" and "item squish" were implemented to lower the numbers used in the game, e.g. a legendary item previously with a level of 1000 reduced to 265. Unique class-specific buffs were added back, i.e. mages' Arcane Brilliance and priests' Mark of Fortitude. Titanforging—a random event that raises the initial item level of an item gained via drops or rewards—is still in the game; however, if the item is one of those affected by the Heart of Azeroth, then that item cannot be titanforged.

Changes were also made to leveling in earlier content with Legion's 7.3.5 patch. The level-scaling tech introduced in Legion was not only be continued in the new continents of Kul Tiras and Zandalar, but was also applied to content from prior expansions, allowing larger level brackets for lower level zones. Further, as previous expansions are now included in the base game, the level ranges for those expansions are now broadened, allowing players to spend more time leveling in preferred expansions and avoid others entirely. Some examples include a zone like Westfall having its level bracket (at 10–15 as of Legion) increased to 10–60, whilst continents such as Outland and Northrend sharing a 60–80 level bracket. The aim of this change is to encourage more player choice whilst leveling and to allow players to experience the full story of a particular zone without overlevelling the relevant quests.

There were not as many class changes in Battle for Azeroth as there were for Legion, although Ion Hazzikostas noted, "Not all experiments were successful (i.e. Demonology Warlocks). Survival Hunter execution needs work but we're committed to the melee Hunter."

=== Heart of Azeroth ===
The Heart of Azeroth is an artifact given to the player character from the world soul via Magni Bronzebeard. It is a necklace that can use the power of Azerite, the lifeblood of the embryonic titan Azeroth (See Plot, below). Azerite is similar in function to Legion's artifact power, in that it is gathered normally from playing the game and is used to upgrade an artifact; likewise, the Heart is similar in function to Legion's artifact weapons by having the capacity to be constantly upgraded. Unlike artifact weapons, however, the Heart is shared with all of the player's specializations and can empower all eligible pieces worn simultaneously.

Valid pieces for Azerite empowerment are available for the chest, shoulder, and head slots of all classes. This equipment has multiple tiers of that can be unlocked, represented by a series of concentric wheels with icons representing individual powers; as individual powers are selected, they rotate into slots at the top of the interface, activating the selected benefit and locking out the others unless the player pays to reset their decision. Outer rings offer multiple choices, some based around the character's class and specification, others around the zone or circumstances in which the gear was acquired. The innermost circle offers no such options, instead of being a boost to the level of the item itself, and thus providing a flat all-around benefit.

=== Allied races ===
The allied races, who were formerly neutral factions or newly introduced, can be recruited by completing quest chains. Four of these races were unlocked when the expansion became available for preorder in January 2018, and four more will be added after the game's launch.

The Alliance are able to unlock the void elves (exiled blood elves who can tap into shadow magic, trained by Alleria Windrunner after her experiences on Argus), Lightforged draenei (veterans of the Army of the Light, who fought the Legion on Argus), Dark Iron dwarves (fire-blooded cousins of the dwarves of Ironforge), Kul Tiran humans (larger, more heavyset versions of the in-game humans of Stormwind), and mechagnomes (cyborg gnomes from the lost city of Mechagon).

The Horde has access to the Nightborne (former Night Elves from Suramar), the Highmountain tauren (moose-antlered cousins of the tauren of Mulgore), the Mag'har orcs (survivors of the Iron Horde from Warlords of Draenor), the Zandalari (progenitors of all of the trolls of Azeroth), and the Vulpera (diminutive fox-like people from the deserts of Vol'dun).

When an allied race has been unlocked for a player, new characters from that race will start at level 20. If a player levels an Allied race from 10 to level 50 without using character boosts, they will be rewarded with a unique "Heritage Armor" for transmogrification that reflects the unique lore behind the race but is limited for use to that race. Doing the quests to unlock the allied races will also unlock the races' unique mounts for use by the characters of their faction. The void elves, Lightforged draenei, Highmountain tauren, and Nightborne, as races tied to the storyline for Legion, were made available with the preorder on January 30, 2018. The Dark Iron dwarves and the Mag'har orcs are made available upon completing the "War Campaign" in Kul Tiras and Zandalar and reaching exalted with one faction's War Campaign reputation (7th Legion and The Honorbound, respectively). The Kul Tiran humans and Zandalari were made available in patch 8.2, unlockable by completing the story quests in all three zones of their respective home continents and exalted reputation with their faction (Proudmoore Admiralty and Zandalari Empire, respectively). The mechagnomes and the vulpera were introduced in patch 8.3, unlockable by completing the story quests in their home zones (Mechagon and Vol'dun, respectively) and reaching exalted with their factions (Rustbolt Resistance and Voldunai, respectively).

=== Warfronts ===
Warfronts will be a new form of 20-player PvE content. They will function similarly to battlegrounds but with more focus on base building, capture and control of territory and resource control to focus on Warcraft's RTS roots. The warfronts will not always be active on a regular basis since there will be a build up to each one. Heroic warfronts (a more difficult version of a normal warfront) will be released in Patch 8.2: Rise of Azshara.

=== Island expeditions ===
Similar to the 3-player scenarios in Mists of Pandaria, island expeditions are a new form of 3-player content that will provide dynamic challenges that involve battling against a group of either advanced AI NPCs or players in order to gather Azerite for their faction's war effort.

=== PvP ruleset ===
The expansion brings a major change to the PvP ruleset on each realm. Every realm by default only allows players to attack NPCs in the open world; players who wish to engage in world PvP now have a setting called "War Mode" that can only be toggled on or off in their faction's capital city (i.e. Stormwind for the Alliance and Orgrimmar for the Horde). While in War Mode, players have access to new talents and abilities, as well as a slightly accelerated rate of XP gain. Characters with War Mode activated are only able to see other players with War Mode, unless in their own capital cities.

Players who engage in War Mode and are successful at killing multiple enemy PC's without dying in exchange receive an "Assassin" buff that increases their damage and healing. Eventually, such a character gains a bounty on their head, giving other players a reward for killing them.

Roleplaying (RP) servers do not behave the same way as the regular servers. The game director said, "The default behavior for RP servers in Battle for Azeroth will be that PvP flagging people would see other flagged players on that same server. We don't want to split up RP communities."

A new battleground called Seething Shore was previewed in Legion's patch 7.3.5. It is located in Silithus and set after the events of the Antorus raid; it involves players battling to take control of Azerite resources in randomized locations. It was the first battleground added to the game since 2012's Mists of Pandaria.

=== Art ===
Warlocks have received new spell effects; all the other classes received new effects in Legion. Male orcs are now able to toggle between the initial hunched posture and standing upright by using a barbershop, but the other races are not able to toggle between two postures. There are new druid forms for the allied races, i.e., Zandalari troll forms are all dinosaur-based, while the Kul Tiran humans take forms made of wood and bone as their teachings come from the Drust people who populated the land before them rather than the Cenarion Circle.

== Plot ==
=== War of the Thorns ===
At the end of Legion, the mad titan Sargeras was imprisoned, but not before he plunged his sword into the planet Azeroth. This not only devastated a massive area (much of the desert zone of Silithus is now cracked and scorched), but badly wounded the gestating titan inside. While the heroes managed to ablate the worst of the damage (at the cost of the majority of their artifact weapons' mythic power), the world is still wounded and bleeding a substance called "Azerite," which has great magical potential. The Horde Warchief, Sylvanas Windrunner, attempts to consolidate Horde power on Kalimdor and gain a monopoly on Azerite (which is primarily found at the southern end of the continent). Her campaign to do so formed a pre-launch event for the expansion and ends with the major Night Elf holdings on the continent seized or destroyed, including the Night Elf player starting zones of Teldrassil and Darnassus. Two supporting tie-in novellas were published by Blizzard, both in hardcover and on the World of Warcraft website: Elegy, by Christie Golden, tells the story from the Alliance perspective; and A Good War, by Robert Brooks, tells the story from the Horde perspective.

Horde and Alliance players were given different quest chains during this pre-launch event, each showing the in-game story from that faction's perspective. The final section of the event featured the Warbringers: Sylvanas cinematic for both Horde and Alliance players. For Alliance players, the cinematic was followed by a quest in Darnassus which gave them a little over three minutes to put out fires and rescue Night Elf citizens, with a counter starting at 982 citizens to be rescued. Unlike some quests in which party members' contributions apply to all party members, these rescues were not cumulative, but the quest succeeded automatically regardless of the number of citizens rescued, or not rescued. After this quest chain, Teldrassil was shown to high level players only as a charred ruin off the coast of Darkshore and they could no longer access the zone except by visiting the past via interaction with an NPC. It was, however, still the Night Elf starting zone and was not removed from the game.

=== Battle for Lordaeron ===
The Alliance makes a retaliatory strike against her home base, the Undercity, which was formerly the human capital of Lordaeron. After a long, drawn-out battle, which includes Sylvanas revealing a powerful Azerite weapon and High Overlord Varok Saurfang being captured by Alliance champions, the Horde is pushed back to the throne room and is eventually driven out entirely. As a parting gift, however, Sylvanas saturates the area with disease and toxins that render the kingdom uninhabitable. With this tit-for-tat military exchange, the Horde has almost complete control over Kalimdor, while the Alliance has near-total dominion over the Eastern Kingdoms. With further conflict inevitable, Battle for Azeroth takes the two factions to the continents of Kul Tiras and Zandalar where they attempt to recruit new allies in order to turn the tides of war.

=== Return of the Lord Admiral ===
In Kul Tiras, the Alliance's initial attempt to gain the nation's assistance ends disastrously when Katherine Proudmoore, Lord Admiral of Kul Tiras and mother to Archmage Jaina Proudmoore, not only refuses the Alliance's request for aid but also orders Jaina arrested and exiled for her role in the death of her father, Daelin Proudmoore, in the aftermath of the Third War. It quickly becomes apparent that Kul Tiras has become mired in corruption and outside threats, so Anduin and Genn Greymane send Alliance Champions to aid the Kul Tirans and earn their trust. Aiding them in this quest are Flynn Fairwind, a "retired" privateer, and Taelia Fordragon, the idealistic daughter of Bolvar Fordragon, former High Lord of Stormwind and current Lich King of the Undead Scourge. The Alliance is successfully able to earn the trust of Kul Tiras by combating the pirates of the traitorous Ashvane Trading Company in Tiragarde Sound, the Naga and corrupted agents of Queen Azshara in Stormsong Valley, and the occult forces of the ancient, ghostly warlord Gorak Tul in Drustvar. After these threats are defeated, Katherine is left despondent at her inability to lead her people, and resolves to help the Alliance find Jaina and reconcile with her.

The Alliance eventually track Jaina to the prison island of Fate's End, where Gorak Tul, having survived the events of Drustvar, has kidnapped her and is tormenting her with visions of her past failures. The Alliance champions and Katherine destroy Gorak Tul once and for all and rescue Jaina, who is finally able to let go of the hate, anger and obsession with the past that defined her ever since the destruction of Theramore. The Alliance and Proudmoores then unite to defend the capital city of Boralus from a massive pirate siege, after which Jaina is named Lord Admiral and pledges Kul Tiras' navy to the Alliance.

=== Battle of Dazar'alor ===
Meanwhile, in Zandalar, the Horde seeks to earn the trust of King Rastakhan so they can use his legendary Golden Fleet against the Alliance. To this end, they assist Rastakhan and his court in dealing with local threats in Zuldazar, fight maniacal Blood Trolls in Nazmir, and face off with serpentine Old God cultists in Vol'dun. Throughout their journey, the Horde gradually learns about an eldritch being known as G'huun, an artificial Old God accidentally created by the Titans and the patron deity of the Blood Trolls. The Blood Trolls and the Faithless Sethekk seek to free G'huun from his prison of Uldir so they can use him to rule Azeroth, and to this end they resurrect G'huun's champion, the C'thrax Mythrax, to destroy Uldir's seal. Rastakhan's own chief adviser, the prophet Zul, is revealed to be the Blood Trolls' secret leader and launches an armed revolt against Rastakhan. With the Horde champions' help, Rastakhan is able to defeat Zul and his forces, but not before Mythrax destroys Uldir's seal. With the seal broken, G'huun's full power begins to manifest. Champions of both the Horde and the Alliance venture deep within Uldir and face G'huun's champions, including Mythrax and a resurrected Zul, before finally slaying the Blood God himself.

With G'huun's threat eliminated, the Horde and Alliance return their focus to the war. While the Horde procures the Scepter of the Tides, a legendary artifact capable of controlling the seas, the Alliance dismantles a potential alliance between Sylvanas and the vampiric San'layn Elves. The Alliance begins to gear up for a preemptive strike against Zandalar, with the goal of crippling the Golden Fleet before it can be used against the Alliance and driving a wedge between the Zandalari and the Horde. Eventually, the Alliance finishes its preparations and launches an attack on the Zandalari capital of Dazar'alor, attempting to capture Rastakhan alive. Despite Anduin and Jaina's desire to do so, Rastakhan is overwhelmed by the power of his pact with the loa Bwonsamdi, and the Alliance champions are forced to slay him. Enraged by Rastakhan's death, Horde champions launch a vicious counterattack on the withdrawing Alliance forces, which ends with both Jaina and High Tinkerer Mekkatorque gravely wounded.

=== Battle for Darkshore ===
Meanwhile, Tyrande Whisperwind and Malfurion Stormrage grow impatient regarding liberating Darkshore from the Horde's control, ultimately choosing to begin the offensive on their own, against Anduin's advice. In order to maximize their chances, Tyrande undergoes a ritual to turn herself into the Night Warrior, the avatar of Elune's most wrathful and warlike aspects. To counter this, Sylvanas orders several Night Elven heroes who fell in the Burning of Teldrassil to be raised as Dark Rangers to bolster her forces.

As the battle for Darkshore begins, both the Alliance and Horde are blindsided by a new development: High Overlord Varok Saurfang, who had been defeated and captured in the Battle of Lordearon, has suddenly escaped Alliance captivity and is on the run. Sylvanas sends Horde Champions to track Saurfang down, ostensibly to extract him. However, it quickly becomes apparent that the search party is in fact an assassination squad, as Sylvanas suspects Saurfang of colluding with the Alliance in an attempt to dethrone her. While some Horde champions choose to side with Saurfang and help him escape the assassins, other champions remain loyal to Sylvanas and report Saurfang's and the dissenting champions' treachery to her.

=== Dissension within the Horde ===
As the Alliance leadership debates their next move, Sylvanas, infuriated by the Horde's defeat, resurrects Jaina's long dead older brother Derek Proudmoore as a Forsaken, an act that horrifies the surviving Horde leaders, with the intent to use him as a sleeper agent to destroy the Proudmoore family from within. Unable to tolerate Sylvanas' dishonorable tactics, Baine Bloodhoof turns against her and, with the help of Forsaken priest Thomas Zelling, smuggles Derek out of Horde territory with the intent of returning him to Jaina. While Derek is successfully returned to the Alliance, Baine's "treachery" is discovered by Sylvanas and her loyalists, resulting in Zelling being executed and Baine imprisoned. After escaping from Stormwind prison with Anduin's help, Saurfang travels to Nagrand in Outland to seek out the aid of Thrall, who went into hiding during the last invasion of the Burning Legion. After initially refusing to aid the Horde and remain in hiding with his family, Thrall is eventually convinced to fight after he and Saurfang are attacked by two Forsaken assassins sent by Sylvanas.

Sometime later, Lor'themar Theron, Regent Lord of the Blood Elves, learns that Baine will soon be put to death for his actions against Sylvanas. Unwilling to allow this, Lor'themar enlists Horde champions to find Baine and save him from execution. As the loyalist Horde champions rush to report Lor'themar's "treason" to Nathanos Blightcaller, the rebel Horde champions meet up with Saurfang and Thrall to rescue Baine, who is being held in Garrosh Hellscream's former Underhold. As they arrive, they receive unexpected backup from Jaina, Spymaster Mathias Shaw, and Alliance champions, who also seek to rescue Baine as Anduin believes his survival to be critical to eventual peace between the Horde and the Alliance. Their combined might fight their way through Sylvanas' forces and successfully extract Baine to Thunder Bluff. In the aftermath, as Thrall bitterly notes how every attempted reconciliation between the Alliance and the Horde ultimately ended in complete failure, Jaina assures him that this time, there is hope for true peace after how much they have all changed.

=== Rise of Azshara ===
Meanwhile, the Shrine of Storms in Stormsong Valley, which had laid dormant after Alliance champions had routed Queen Azshara's forces there, suddenly begins brimming with new activity. Xal'atath, an Old God-touched dagger that had played a role in the war against the Burning Legion, is found by the champions of Alliance and Horde. Xal'atath compels them to deliver powerful relics to N'Zoth, the last Old God and patron of Queen Azshara, who challenges the champions to test their mettle against his champions in the deepest parts of the Shrine. The champions reluctantly accept N'Zoth's challenge and reclaim the relics to defeat his champions. In the aftermath of the battle, to the champions' shock, the spirit that had once inhabited Xal'atath is gone, having been freed by N'Zoth. Horde Champions decide to bring the now inert dagger to Sylvanas, much to the Alliance's concern.

Later, Sylvanas sends Nathanos Blightcaller, Lor'themar Theron, and Thalyssra out to sea with the remnants of the Horde fleet for unknown purposes. Hearing of this, the Alliance sends its own fleet led by Jaina and Genn Greymane to pursue them. However, in the middle of the pursuit, Queen Azshara uses the Tidestone to reveal the underwater Naga capital Nazjatar, trapping both the Horde and Alliance fleets and forcing them to work together to survive against the Naga onslaught. Working with Alliance and Horde Champions, they are able to retake the Tidestone and use it to open the way to Azshara's palace.

Under the leadership of Lor'themar and Jaina, Horde and Alliance champions breach Azshara's palace, fighting their way through her strongest servants before finally confronting the Naga Queen herself, who suddenly steals the Heart of Azeroth, an artifact Horde and Alliance champions have been using in an attempt to heal Azeroth after Sargeras had plunged his sword into the planet, and uses its accumulated power to break N'Zoth's seal. After a titanic battle, Azshara is defeated, but before the champions can finish her off, N'Zoth breaks free of his prison and pulls Azshara into the Void, ominously declaring that "all eyes shall be opened". Realizing that the war between the Alliance and the Horde has all along been a distraction from N'Zoth's master plan, Jaina and Lor'themar resolve to overthrow Sylvanas, then unite their forces for a final stand against the Old God.

=== Heroes of Azeroth ===
With their numbers dwindling, the remaining Horde and Alliance leaders decide to regroup in Dustwallow Marsh. Anduin, Saurfang, Jaina, Thrall, the Horde champion Rexxar, Lor'themar, Mayla Highmountain, and Zekhan rally their remaining soldiers for one final stand against Sylvanas. Though Saurfang is hesitant, the Alliance king assures him that their fight isn't just to protect themselves, but also to protect Azeroth. The combined forces march upon the gates of Orgrimmar, the Horde capital. When they arrive, they are met with dozens of Forsaken guards ready to defend their queen. Saurfang calls out Sylvanas in a challenge of Mak'gora, a fight to the death for the leadership of the Horde. With Thrall's blessing and Anduin's legendary blade Shalamayne, Saurfang fights one on one against Sylvanas but is hopelessly outmatched. As she prepares to finish him, Sylvanas mocks the old soldier, claiming that all hope dies with him. Saurfang retorts that while she destroyed many things, she never destroyed hope. He manages to land a single blow before an enraged Sylvanas kills him with a blast of unknown dark magic. Before she escapes alone, she declares that she never truly cared for the Horde and saw them all as pawns to her own personal gains, losing the trust of her soldiers.

While a memorial is held in Saurfang's honor, Sylvanas regroups with her remaining loyalist champions at Windrunner Spire and prepares for her bargains with Azshara, N'Zoth, and Death to bear fruit.

=== Visions of N'Zoth ===
As the Alliance and the Horde both prepare for N'Zoth's invasion, they agree to an armistice, officially bringing their war to an end. Tyrande, however, refuses to be satisfied until Sylvanas is dead, which worries Anduin and Shandris Feathermoon, despite Jaina's reassurance that she has the Kul Tiran fleet scouring the seas, and Shaw sending spies to every dark corner of Azeroth. Meanwhile, the Horde leaders agree to retire the title of Warchief in favor of a council filled with representatives of each Horde race. For his role in starting the war and for his continued black market dealings in Azerite, Jastor Gallywix is ousted as Trade Prince of the Bilgewater Cartel Goblins and replaced with Gazlowe of Ratchet.

Sometime later, Wrathion, grandson of Deathwing, arrives in Stormwind, offering to help against N'Zoth as an advisor. Despite his fury over how Wrathion began the chain of events that led to the Burning Legion's Third Invasion and subsequently Varian's death, Anduin agrees to accept his aid. Wrathion explains that N'zoth, after being freed during the battle against Azshara, has taken refuge in his otherworldly city Ny'alotha, corrupted Neltharion into Deathwing and now seeks to forcibly merge it and Azeroth in order to recreate the Black Empire. To stop him, Wrathion proposes to create a magical cloak for champions of the Horde and Alliance that will allow them to enter Ny'alotha and defeat N'Zoth without the risk of corruption. As the champions of the Alliance and Horde work to both complete the cloak and prepare for the final battle, N'Zoth's forces begin launching raids across Azeroth, seeking to bring all that they can under their master's thrall.

Eventually, the Alliance and Horde champions lay siege of Ny'alotha, defeating N'Zoth's mightiest servants before confronting the Old God himself. Despite a titanic battle, N'Zoth's corruption proves too powerful and is on the verge of taking full control over the Champions. However, at the last moment, Azeroth's Titan Soul herself intervenes and grants the champions a surge of power, allowing them to overcome N'Zoth's corruption and destroy him and Ny'alotha once and for all.

As Azeroth returns to a period of relative peace, in Icecrown, Bolvar realizes that the final battle against Sylvanas is close at hand, and so begins raising a new generation of Death Knights to serve as his vanguard against the Banshee Queen.

=== Enter the Shadowlands ===
With her pieces in place, Sylvanas travels to Northrend and confronts the Lich King, Bolvar Fordragon, atop Icecrown Citadel. She easily disposes of the Scourge forces and takes charge against the Lich King. With her newfound dark magic, she binds him in chains and takes off the crown, claiming Fordragon to be unfit to wear it. Bolvar warns her that putting on the crown will imprison her forever, but she retorts that simply existing in this world is her prison. Instead of placing the crown on her head, she pulls it apart and snaps it in two, causing the sky to shatter above the Citadel, revealing a portal to the Shadowlands, the land of the dead.

== Setting ==
The expansion is set immediately after the events of Legion. Two continents have been added within the Great Sea between the Eastern Kingdoms and Kalimdor: Kul Tiras, one of the major human kingdoms, and Zandalar, the homeland of Azeroth's trolls. While the Alliance and Horde will initially travel to one continent respectively, both continents will be available to both factions at level 120.

=== Kul Tiras ===
The human nation of Kul Tiras is the primary location for Alliance characters in the expansion. It is divided into three zones: Tiragarde Sound (which houses the Alliance capital of Boralus), Drustvar, and Stormsong Valley.

=== Zandalar ===
The troll empire of Zandalar is the primary location for Horde characters in the expansion. Like Kul Tiras, it is also divided into three zones: Zuldazar (which houses the Horde capital of Dazar'alor), Nazmir, and Vol'dun.

== Development ==
The expansion was announced at BlizzCon 2017 on November 3, 2017. Battle for Azeroth started restricted alpha testing in early February 2018. Public beta testing began in late April 2018. Blizzard revealed the release date on April 5, 2018 alongside a collector's edition.

== Reception ==
Reception

Aggregate score
Aggregator	Score
Metacritic	79/100

Review scores
Publication	Score
Destructoid	8/10
Game Informer	8.75/10
GameSpot	7/10
IGN	8/10
PC Gamer (UK)	86/100
Digital Trends	86/100
PC World	4/5
The Escapist	8/10
Softpedia	8.5/10
PCGamesN	8/10

Battle for Azeroth received "generally favorable" reviews according to Metacritic. IGN praised the expansion stating that, "The zones themselves are wonderfully diverse." While GameSpot praised the addition of Allied Races to the Alliance & Hordes stating, "Allied Races themselves are so well-crafted that it's almost worth it for lore aficionados alone". Despite all the positive reviews, Polygon questions the longevity of the game, "laundry list of glaring systematic issues." PCWorld ranked it 4 out of 5 Stars stating "complications with the Azerite gear and the occasional tedious dungeons prove it's not perfect, but there's such a wealth of things to do here that the rough spots never detract from the whole."

=== Sales ===
The expansion sold more than 3.4 million units on its first day of release according to Blizzard, making it the fastest-selling World of Warcraft expansion.

=== Accolades ===
Year	Award	Category	Result	Ref.
2018	9th Hollywood Music in Media Awards	Original Score	Nominated	
2018	9th Hollywood Music in Media Awards	Original Song ("Warbringers: Jaina")	Nominated	
2018	Gamers' Choice Awards	Fan Favorite Multiplayer Game	Nominated	
2018	Gamers' Choice Awards	Fan Favorite MMORPG	Won	
2019	National Academy of Video Game Trade Reviewers Awards	Game, Franchise Role Playing	Nominated	
2019	2019 G.A.N.G. Awards	Best Dialogue	Nominated	
2020	2020 G.A.N.G. Awards	Best Cinematic Cutscene Audio (Patch 8.25)	Nominated	
