= World of Warcraft: Legion =

2016 expansion set for World of Warcraft

- Developer: Blizzard Entertainment
- Publisher: Blizzard Entertainment
- Directors: Tom Chilton; Ion Hazzikostas; Alex Afrasiabi
- Designers: Cory Stockton; Jonathan LeCraft; Jeremy Feasel; Brian Holinka; Chadd Nervig
- Composers: Russell Brower; Neal Acree; Clint Bajakian
- Series: Warcraft
- Platforms: OS X, Windows
- Release: August 30, 2016
- Genre: Massively multiplayer online role-playing game
- Mode: Multiplayer

World of Warcraft: Legion is the sixth expansion set in the massively multiplayer online role-playing game (MMORPG) World of Warcraft, following Warlords of Draenor. It was announced on August 6, 2015 at Gamescom 2015. The expansion was released on August 30, 2016.

The expansion raised the existing level cap from 100 to 110, features artifact weapons for each class's specializations, includes a new area on Azeroth called the Broken Isles and introduces the demon hunter hero class that started at level 98. It initially included ten 5-man dungeons and two raids.

== Gameplay ==
At release, the expansion allowed players to level up to 110 in the Broken Isles, an increase from the cap of 100 in the previous expansion Warlords of Draenor. Initially, there were ten dungeons in 7.0 with patch 7.1 adding the revamped Karazhan dungeon, patch 7.2 adding Cathedral of the Eternal Night and patch 7.3 adding the Seat of the Triumvirate on the planet Argus - the headquarters of the Burning Legion and the former home of the Draenei. There are four raid tiers in Legion, with the first tier being The Emerald Nightmare that opened three weeks after Legion's release along with the small raid Trial of Valor that opened in patch 7.1, the second raid tier The Nighthold in patch 7.1.5, the third raid tier Tomb of Sargeras in patch 7.2.5 and the final raid tier is Antorus, the Burning Throne on Argus in patch 7.3.2. After Emerald Nightmare was opened, Mythic Plus dungeons and Legion's first player versus player (PvP) season began. PvP seasons usually follow raid tiers or major patches, with Season 6 beginning after Antorus opened.

The development team made a number of changes to the PvP aspects of the game. There is a PvP honor system that unlocks PvP honor talents, and separate abilities for use only in PvP. Honor talents are abilities earned through increased PvP levels and activated during PvP. Once players hit maximum honor level, they can choose to earn a prestige level that resets the honor talents earned and gives cosmetic bonuses. In PvP combat, gear will be nullified and all bonuses related to gear will be deactivated, with the exception of artifact weapons and their related powers. Instead, the game will predetermine a set of stats configured to a player's specialization that can be modified for class balance purposes. However, a player's average item level will still factor in PvP; every point above item level 800 results in a 0.1% increase to a player's PvP stats.

=== Artifact Weapons ===
Artifact weapons are powerful items that were wielded by legends of the Warcraft universe, and only available to player characters in Legion. There are 36 unique weapons specific for every class and specialization combination, which include the Ashbringer (the sword wielded by the Mograine family, and later Tirion Fordring) for retribution paladins, the Doomhammer (the warhammer wielded by Thrall) for enhancement shamans, the Icebringer and Frostreaper (twin blades together known as the 'Blades of the Fallen Prince' that are forged from the Frostmourne wielded by the Lich King) for frost Death Knights, and other powerful weapons from the Warcraft lore. In addition, there is a fishing artifact called the Underlight Angler for those dedicated to fishing. Players complete quests to obtain these weapons, and the weapons will gain power alongside the player as they level in the Broken Isles, complete world quests, and defeat bosses. The appearance of each artifact can be customized and artifact-specific appearances are unlocked after completing certain tasks. At level 102, quests are available to acquire the other artifact weapons from a player's class that were not initially earned at level 100.

=== Demon Hunters ===
Demon hunters are the second "hero class" in World of Warcraft, joining death knights that were introduced in Wrath of the Lich King. Demon hunters begin as members of the Illidari, the elite guard of Illidan Stormrage during his rule of Outland in The Burning Crusade. Demon hunters operate on the concept of "fighting fire with fire", wielding demonic fel magic to fuel their attacks and harnessing the powers of demons they kill to fight against the Burning Legion. To become demon hunters, an initiate must consume the heart of a demon that results in most initiates dying due to being overwhelmed by the demonic energy or going insane; the survivors become part demon, taking on demonic aspects including horns, wings, claws and hooves. Demon hunters ritually blind themselves to gain 'spectral sight', allowing them to detect demonic energy from demons and to see stealthed enemies, but losing their eyes in the process.

Similar to death knights, demon hunters are able to fill the tank or damage dealer (DPS) role, but only have two specializations: Vengeance for tanking and Havoc for DPS. They wear leather armor and wield a pair of warglaives: curved, two-bladed short sword similar to the Blades of Azzinoth wielded by Illidan. Unlike death knights, which are available to all races, demon hunters are only playable by the two elvish races: Night Elves and Blood Elves. While any race has the potential to become a demon hunter, Illidan only trained elves in the Black Temple.

As a hero class, a demon hunters started at level 98 rather than level 1. Demon hunters have a unique starting experience, similar to death knights; their story begins ten years before Legion (shortly before Illidan's death in the Black Temple raid, as depicted in The Burning Crusade) on the shattered Burning Legion world of Mardum, where they have been sent by Illidan to obtain a demonic artifact, the Sargerite Keystone, used to gain access to the Legion-controlled planets. Upon returning to Outland, the demon hunters find Illidan slain by the Wardens, and are captured and imprisoned in the Vault of the Wardens on Azeroth. Ten years later, demon hunters are freed in order to fight against the Burning Legion after the Horde and Alliance losses at the Broken Shore. As a base of operations, the class's order hall is the captured Legion ship Fel Hammer located on Mardum.

=== Mythic Plus ===
The expansion added a new dungeon difficult: Mythic Plus (stylized as Mythic+ or M+), activated by a keystone. Completing a dungeon that has been activated with a keystone within the time limit awards a higher level keystone, and a chance to receive character items proportionate to the difficulty.

=== Order Halls ===
Each class has an "order hall" - a place of great power linked closely to a character's class, such as Acherus (the hub for death knights introduced in Wrath of the Lich King) or the Temple of Five Dawns (the hub for monks introduced in Mists of Pandaria), where only members of that class can congregate. Player characters can upgrade the look and abilities of their artifact weapons in their class's order hall and engage in missions in the Broken Isles. The player character, for lore purposes, is the leader of the class's organization in question (e.g. a paladin character is the Highlord of the Order of the Silver Hand), similar to being the commander of Alliance or Horde forces in Warlords of Draenor. The order hall locations include the sanctuary beneath Light's Hope Chapel for paladins, a cave overlooking the Maelstrom for shamans, and an enclave on the Burning Legion portal world of Dreadscar Rift for warlocks. The order halls do not include access to the auction house or banks and only the druid and mage order halls include a mailbox. Notably, members of both the Horde and Alliance are seen in the membership of these Order Halls, showcasing the unity of the rival factions in the wake of the Legion's invasion.

=== Changes to existing classes ===
Some existing classes experienced major changes. For example, hunters, who are predominantly ranged and rely on pet damage, had their three specializations changed: Survival allows them to wield melee weapons while fighting alongside their pet, Beastmaster can use multiple pets at once and Marksmanship has the option to forgo their pet in exchange for stronger ranged abilities. Warlocks' demonology specialization no longer has the metamorphosis ability because the ability was given to demon hunters; this warlock specialization is refocused around using multiple summoned demon minions at once, fundamentally changing the specialization. Other removals from the game included the Gladiator Stance talent for Protection Warriors, which helped that specialization do more damage at the expense of tanking ability, and the Fistweaving talent that allowed Mistweaver Monks to heal allies by dealing melee damage. All of the class changes are explained in each of Blizzard's "Legion Class Preview Series".

=== Transmogrify 2.0 ===
The transmogrification system, which allows players to remodel their items' appearances, was expanded with Transmogrify 2.0. All soulbound item appearances players have in their inventory and bank were added to the wardrobe's user interface, similar to the transmogrification system used in Diablo III: Reaper of Souls. Additionally, all applicable gear rewards from every quest completed and treasure found were also added to the player's wardrobe. The wardrobe can be used to create outfits that can be saved to a list and set to change automatically with specialization changes. After items have been added to the wardrobe, the player does not need to keep them in their bank or inventory in order to retain the appearances in the wardrobe.

In addition to the existing options to hide helms and cloaks from appearing on a player character, an option to hide shoulder armor was added to the transmogrify system in patch 7.0. In patch 7.1, options to hide belts, tabards and shirts were added.

== Plot ==
Following the defeat of Archimonde at Hellfire Citadel in an alternate timeline Draenor, the orc warlock Gul'dan was transported to the main timeline Azeroth. Gul'dan invaded the Vault of the Wardens, a prison used to contain dangerous beings from across Azeroth, with the help of the traitorous former Watcher Cordana Felsong, whom he had successfully corrupted to his side back on Draenor. In desperation, the wardens released the "Illidari," demon hunters that use fel power, to help fight against the Burning Legion. Despite this, Gul'dan was successfully able to steal the body of Illidan Stormrage and traveled to the nearby Tomb of Sargeras and opened a massive portal, thereby allowing the Burning Legion to invade Azeroth.

In a pre-expansion event, demonic invasions spawned throughout Azeroth, with both the Alliance and Horde fighting to defend their lands. Khadgar begins researching ways to sever the Legion from their source of power at the Tomb of Sargeras, consulting with the newly awoken Magni Bronzebeard. Magni declares that his innate connection with the land during his slumber has allowed him to communicate with the nascent Titan slumbering within Azeroth. Only by using the five Pillars of Creation, incredibly powerful Titan artifacts, can the forces of Azeroth drive back the Legion. Khadgar teleports the Kirin Tor capital city of Dalaran to the tower of Karazhan to further his research.

Faced with an increasing number of demonic attacks, the Alliance, Horde, and Argent Crusade prepare to launch an invasion with naval, air, and ground forces to the Tomb of Sargeras on the Broken Isles. The demons mislead the Alliance and Horde as to the size of the demonic army present at the Tomb, manipulating them into far underestimating the size of the demonic host. Although they make initial headway against the demons, the heroes of Azeroth are unable to prevail: the majority of the Argent Crusade is destroyed before the Horde and Alliance arrive, and both factions lose their primary leaders in the process. Anduin Wrynn becomes king in his father's place, and Vol'jin's last command is for Sylvanas to lead the Horde. Even worse, miscommunication leads to many within the Alliance believing that the Horde intentionally abandoned them during the battle, inflaming tensions between the two factions to the boiling point once again.

With both the Alliance and Horde devastated by the battle at the Broken Shore, a new source of power is required to defeat the Legion. The players—including the newly introduced demon hunters—must acquire and master artifact weapons and find the Pillars of Creation that hold the power to stop the Legion's invasion. While the Legion remains a focus of the Broken Isles as a whole, it only takes center stage in one (Stormheim). In the other three, primary opposition comes from the Naga of Azshara (in Azsuna), the Old Gods and the Emerald Nightmare (in Val'sharah), and a race of subterranean rock-creatures called Drogbar (in Highmountain). During this time, the players find a powerful Light-infused object, revealed to be the sentience core of the prime Naaru Xe'ra who, following a prophecy about Illidan being a champion against the Legion, guides the heroes on a mission which leads to the successful rescue of Illidan's soul.

After locating the first four Pillars, the heroes receive a distress call from exiled Nightborne from Suramar, where Gul'dan has besieged their home and seized control. With the help of both Horde and Alliance, the players and their allies liberate the Nightborne and their home, defeat Gul'dan and restore Illidan to life, who kills Gul'dan. With his assistance, the class hall orders establish a foothold on the Broken Shore while facing heavy resistance. After fighting back the invasion forces, the players enter the Tomb of Sargeras to end the Legion's presence on Azeroth. The players find and kill Kil'jaeden, but Illidan uses the opportunity to open a rift between Argus and Azeroth, setting the stage for the players to invade Argus. Meanwhile, Anduin Wrynn, plagued with doubt regarding his ability to be a worthy successor to his father, reclaims Varian's compass with the help of Alliance champions. Venturing to the entrance of the Tomb, where Varian fell, Anduin recovers Varian's sword Shalamayne and, with the help of Genn, Velen and even Varian's spirit, finds within himself the confidence and determination to serve the Alliance as its High King.

Velen summons the Alliance and Horde to travel aboard the newly constructed vessel, The Vindicaar. The players travel to the surface and quickly meet the Krokuun, the surviving Broken Draenei that were left on Argus. Shortly thereafter, they encounter the surviving members of the Army of the Light, including Turalyon and Alleria. The player gains ground on Argus and reaches the downed Army of the Light vessel to rescue a dormant Xe'ra. However she is destroyed by Illidan after she attempts to remake him as her prophesied chosen one. Magni arrives and is able to communicate with the world soul of Argus: through it, he learns that Sargeras has captured the essences of his fellow titans, and seeks to revive them under his control.

The players invade Antorus and free the remaining Titans, though Sargeras forces the world soul of Argus to manifest. Thoroughly corrupted and suffering, the players and the Titans are forced to kill it. The players see that Sargeras is at Azeroth and prepared to take it for himself. Sargeras is pulled away by the Titans, but stabs his sword deep into Azeroth as a final act of spite. The players and their allies return home, save Illidan, who stays behind to face Sargeras inside his prison.

While Sargeras is defeated, his giant sword remains; players absorb its corrupting poison into their artifacts, which greatly weakens them but buys the world of Azeroth time. However, the titan's blood has been erupting to the surface in the form of a crystalline substance called Azerite, which has tremendous magical potential. Both factions, still honoring their heroes and mourning their dead, are unwilling to let the other faction have sole access to this miracle substance, and prepare for war again...

== Setting ==
The expansion begins approximately two years after the events of Warlords of Draenor and takes place in the Broken Isles, an island chain near the Maelstrom in the middle of the Great Sea. Originally part of the former supercontinent of Kalimdor, the isles were sent to the bottom of the Great Sea after the Sundering ten thousand years earlier, and used by Aegwynn, the Guardian of Tirisfal, to imprison the corpse of the avatar of Sargeras, the dark titan and leader of the Burning Legion. During the events of Warcraft II: Tides of Darkness, the warlock Gul'dan raised the islands from the sea floor in search of the tomb; Illidan later explored the tomb in Warcraft III: The Frozen Throne. The Demon Hunter's first experiences are portrayed in the novel World of Warcraft: Illidan.

=== Broken Isles ===
There are six zones in the Broken Isles: Azsuna, the Broken Shore, Highmountain, Stormheim, Suramar and Val'sharah. The city of Dalaran, which served as the neutral capital city in Northrend during Wrath of the Lich King, is relocated to the southern part of the Broken Isles to provide a base for the Alliance and Horde forces to fight against the Legion and its other enemies.

=== Argus ===
In patch 7.3, the players invade Argus, the homeworld of the Burning Legion. It has three zones: Krokuun, Antoran Wastes and Eredath (Eredath was originally named Mac'aree in the game's release for developer Jesse Mc'cree, but was renamed following the 2021 lawsuit and Mc'cree's departure). Antorus, the Burning Throne is the fifth Legion raid that was added in patch 7.3.2 and it is located in the Antoran Wastes of Argus.

== Development ==
Legion entered alpha testing in late November 2015. The beta test for the game began on May 12, 2016. The game was released for OS X and Windows on August 30, 2016. Legion has the most voice acting of any Warcraft expansion to date.

Players who purchase the game will receive one level 100 boost to apply to a character and players who pre-ordered the game receive early access starting on August 9 to the demon hunter class before the official release. On July 19, 2016, patch 7.0.3 introduced all the game system changes, which included the class, transmogrify and item stat changes.

On August 9, 2016 (August 10 in the EU) in the weeks before Legion's release, the Burning Legion began its invasion of Azeroth, allowing all player adventurers to defend their world and includes the Broken Shore event—the epicenter of the demonic invasion.

== Reception ==
Reception

Aggregate score
Aggregator	Score
Metacritic	88/100

Review scores
Publication	Score
GameSpot	9/10
IGN	9.1/10
PC Gamer (US)	90/100
Polygon	9.5/10

Legion was acclaimed, scoring an 88 on Metacritic. During the first week of the game's launch, the number of concurrent players reached its highest point since the 2010 launch of the Cataclysm expansion. IGN praised the expansion stating that, "Legion shows World of Warcraft finding its footing again and asserting its relevance after more than a decade." GameSpot praised the new zones, world quests, dungeon design, and closed by stating, "Blizzard has proven it can still craft an MMO experience as well as--if not better--than anyone else." Polygon praised the quality of life enhancements the expansion brought to the game, as well as stating that the classic questing and raiding system "is as good as it's ever been."

=== Sales ===
The expansion set sold 3.3 million copies by its official release date of August 30, 2016, matching the previous expansion sales record held by Cataclysm.

=== Accolades ===
Year	Award	Category	Result	Ref
2016	The Game Awards 2016	Best Role Playing Game	Nominated	
2016	Game Informer Best of 2016 Awards	Best PC Exclusive	Won	
2016	Game Informer Best of 2016 Awards	Best MMO	Won	
2016	2016 Hollywood Music in Media Awards	Best Original Score - Video Game	Nominated	
2017	20th Annual D.I.C.E. Awards	Role-Playing/Massively Multiplayer Game of the Year	Nominated	
