= Cho'gall =

Warcraft character

- Warcraft character
- Concept art of Cho'gall by Chris Metzen.
- First appearance: Warcraft II: Tides of Darkness (1995)

In-universe information
- Species: Ogre
- Occupation: Chieftain of the Twilight's Hammer

Cho'gall is a character in Blizzard Entertainment's Warcraft franchise, introduced in the 1995 video game Warcraft II: Tides of Darkness. A two-headed ogre-mage, he leads the Twilight's Hammer, initially a clan within the Horde and later a cult devoted to the Old Gods. He is associated with the warlock Gul'dan and the Shadow Council. His later appearances include a boss role in World of Warcraft: Cataclysm, the franchise's comics, and Hearthstone.

In 2015, Cho'gall was added to Blizzard's multiplayer online battle arena game Heroes of the Storm as a character controlled simultaneously by two players. One player controls his movement and melee attacks, while the other casts spells. The developers tested several ways of dividing control and coordinating the two players' abilities. Reviews praised the cooperative design and its departure from conventional characters in the genre, but also discussed the difficulty of coordinating attacks and finding a partner.

== Development ==
Blizzard began developing Cho'gall for Heroes of the Storm in late 2012, but shelved him as the game underwent changes. For his visual design, the artists considered depictions from the earlier Warcraft strategy games, the comics, and World of Warcraft. According to senior game designer Matthew Cooper, an early playable version was a conventional tank character controlled by one player. As the team developed the game's talent system, it reconsidered Cho'gall's role and explored having two players control him.

Technical designer John Hodgson described the idea as an inversion of the game's Lost Vikings, three characters controlled by one player. Cho'gall's two heads made him a suitable character for the experiment. Designer Kent-Erik Hagman and game director Dustin Browder rejected having the players compete for movement control. To test whether the second player's role would be enjoyable, the developers attached the existing character Abathur permanently to Arthas, increased Abathur's damage, and disabled his independent abilities. This allowed them to try the arrangement before committing to a complete implementation.

The developers settled on a division resembling a driver and gunner, with Cho positioning the character and Gall concentrating on damage. Technically, Gall was implemented as an invisible unit attached to Cho; the team had to address situations that could separate them. The shared Rune Bomb attack also required revision. An early version placed bombs in orbit around Cho and required Gall to hit them with his Shadowflame spell. Testing found this difficult and frustrating, so Gall received a separate ability to detonate the bombs.

Hagman said that the team underestimated the coordination requirements and the work needed to test both heads' abilities and talents. It introduced formal assignments for playtests so that enough developers would try each head. In retrospect, he thought that more structured testing would have helped. Although Cho and Gall argue in the fiction, Hagman wanted their players to enjoy cooperating. Competition between the players was instead permitted over cosmetic choices, such as the character's appearance and mount.

At BlizzCon 2016, Blizzard staff discussed the difficulties of implementing Cho'gall's horse-carrying animation and identified Ragnaros's custom mount as an example of subsequent improvements to the mounting system. In 2026, Blizzard again cited Cho'gall among the game's early unconventional heroes when explaining its design priorities for newer characters like Xal’atath, including unusual abilities and cooperation between teammates.

== Appearances ==
=== Warcraft ===
Cho'gall is introduced in Warcraft II: Tides of Darkness, released in 1995. The manual describes him as an ogre-mage, a member of the Shadow Council, and the chieftain of the Twilight's Hammer clan. Gul'dan helped him develop his magical abilities, and Cho'gall supports his clan's ambition to bring destruction to other peoples. He accompanies Gul'dan's expedition to the Tomb of Sargeras but manages to survives the destruction of their forces.

In the series' subsequent history, Cho'gall becomes a follower of the Old Gods, powerful eldritch beings imprisoned on Azeroth. Following the whispers of the Old God C'Thun, he travels to Kalimdor and develops the Twilight's Hammer into a cult that recruits beyond its original orc membership. In the World of Warcraft comics, Med'an, the son of Garona and Medivh, defeats Cho'gall during an attempt to summon an Old God.

In World of Warcraft: Cataclysm, contact with the Old Gods has altered Cho'gall's body and mind, as the ogre-mage continues to lead the Twilight's Hammer in service to the Old Gods and the dragon Deathwing. Players confront him as a boss in the Bastion of Twilight, a raid dungeon in the Twilight Highlands that serves as the cult's headquarters. An alternate incarnation appears in Warlords of Draenor, where he betrays Gul'dan. In the Mythic difficulty of the Highmaul raid, Cho'gall interrupts the battle against Imperator Mar'gok, drains his power, and becomes the players' final opponent.

Cho'gall also appears as a Warlock minion card in Hearthstone, introduced in its Whispers of the Old Gods expansion.

=== Heroes of the Storm ===
Cho'gall was released for Heroes of the Storm on November 17, 2015. He was initially distributed to holders of a BlizzCon ticket or virtual ticket. During the accompanying promotion, other players could unlock him by winning two matches while playing him with someone who already owned the character. Technical director Alan Dabiri said that this method of distribution was chosen to complement the social experience of playing him.

Each player controls one head: Cho handles movement and melee combat, while Gall casts ranged spells. Their abilities can be combined, including an attack in which Cho throws a bomb that Gall detonates. The players share a health pool, and the character's death kills both of them. Cho'gall occupies two places on a five-player team, leaving it with four bodies on the battlefield. Hodgson described the resulting trade-off as greater individual strength at the cost of being able to cover less ground.

== Reception ==
Reviewing Cho'gall at BlizzCon 2015, Daniel Tack of Game Informer considered him the standout among the three newly demonstrated Heroes of the Storm characters. He enjoyed the cooperation between the players and welcomed Blizzard's willingness to depart from established character designs in the genre. Tack also noted the risks of concentrating two players in one body: effects that disabled a character could deprive the team of both players at once. He thought an uncooperative partner could make the experience frustrating, although visual cues helped players coordinate without voice communication.

Tom Marks of PC Gamer described controlling Cho'gall with another person as an unusually intimate experience for the genre. His early matches exposed the difficulty of coordinating the shared bomb attack, which became easier when his partner announced when he was throwing it. Marks particularly enjoyed choosing upgrades that benefited the other player's abilities and required him to trust that player to use them. He praised the experiment with shared control in a genre that usually emphasized individual skill, while expecting a player's enjoyment to depend heavily on the choice of partner. Alex Wawro of Gamasutra compared the division of control to playing MechWarrior with a friend on one keyboard, with one person operating the legs and the other the torso.

A GamesBeat reviewer found that many of the abilities could be coordinated with little verbal communication because their visual cues and delays gave the other player time to respond. The reviewer praised the originality behind the gameplay design, and Gall's concentration on spellcasting without responsibility for positioning. However, the reviewer noted that the requirement to arrange a partner before entering matchmaking made the character inconvenient for someone who usually played alone, and argued that this additional effort could discourage players from selecting the character.
