= Warcraft (film) =

2016 film by Duncan Jones

- Theatrical release poster
- Directed by: Duncan Jones
- Written by: Charles Leavitt; Duncan Jones
- Based on: Warcraft by Blizzard Entertainment (Note: Warcraft: Orcs & Humans was developed by Blizzard Entertainment, published by Blizzard Entertainment and Interplay Productions, directed by Patrick Wyatt, produced by Bill Roper and Wyatt, and programmed by Bob Fitch, Jesse McReynolds, Michael Morhaime, and Wyatt.)
- Produced by: Charles Roven; Alex Gartner; Thomas Tull; Jon Jashni; Stuart Fenegan
- Starring: Travis Fimmel; Paula Patton; Ben Foster; Dominic Cooper; Toby Kebbell; Ben Schnetzer; Robert Kazinsky; Daniel Wu
- Cinematography: Simon Duggan
- Edited by: Paul Hirsch
- Music by: Ramin Djawadi
- Production companies: Legendary Pictures; Blizzard Entertainment; Atlas Entertainment
- Distributed by: Universal Pictures
- Release dates: May 24, 2016 (Le Grand Rex); June 10, 2016 (United States)
- Running time: 123 minutes
- Country: United States
- Language: English
- Budget: $160 million
- Box office: $439.1 million

Warcraft (alternatively known as Warcraft: The Beginning) is a 2016 American action fantasy film based on the video game series of the same name. Directed by Duncan Jones, who co-wrote with Charles Leavitt, it stars Travis Fimmel, Paula Patton, Ben Foster, Dominic Cooper, Toby Kebbell, Ben Schnetzer, Robert Kazinsky, and Daniel Wu. The film follows Anduin Lothar of Stormwind and Durotan of the Frostwolf clan as heroes set on opposite sides of a growing war, as the warlock Gul'dan leads the Horde to invade Azeroth using a magic portal. Together, a few human heroes and dissenting orcs must attempt to stop the true evil behind this war and restore peace.

The film was first announced in 2006 as a project partnership between Legendary Pictures and the game's developer, Blizzard Entertainment. Warcraft premiered in Paris on May 24, 2016, and was released by Universal Pictures in the United States on June 10, 2016. The film grossed $439 million worldwide against a production budget of $160 million, becoming the highest-grossing film based on a video game at the time. However, it failed to reach its break-even point of $450–500 million after global marketing and distribution. The film received generally negative reviews from critics, though fans of the Warcraft franchise were kinder to it.

== Plot ==
Draenor, homeworld to the orcs, is being torn apart by a force known as fel magic. Orc warlock Gul'dan unites the orc clans into the Horde, and creates a portal to another world, Azeroth, by using fel magic to drain the life out of captive draenei. Gul'dan leads a small warband through the portal to capture and sacrifice prisoners on Azeroth to bring the Horde. Durotan, chieftain of the Frostwolf Clan, his pregnant mate Draka, and his friend Orgrim Doomhammer join this initial warband. On Azeroth, Draka goes into labor, and Gul'dan rescues Go'el, the dying baby, by draining the life out of a deer to revive and infuse him with fel magic. The orcs raid settlements throughout Azeroth. Anduin Lothar, commander of the human forces of Stormwind Kingdom, finds trespassing mage Khadgar investigating the bodies of the slain men. Khadgar notices the bodies contain traces of fel magic. Stormwind's king, Llane Wrynn, sends them to the stronghold Karazhan to inform Medivh, the Guardian of Tirisfal, of the fel magic's presence on Azeroth.

Lothar, Khadgar, and Medivh join a scouting team following traces of fel magic, but are ambushed by orcs. Medivh uses a spell to kill the fel-corrupted orcs, leaving the Horde's warchief, Blackhand, to flee along with Durotan and Orgrim. The team takes a half-orc slave, Garona, as prisoner, but Llane releases her in exchange for loyalty to Stormwind. Garona leads the humans to spy on the orc camp, where they learn of Gul'dan's plan to bring the Horde to Azeroth. While studying a book found in Medivh's library, Khadgar realizes that Gul'dan had help from someone in Azeroth opening the portal. Despite Orgrim's objections, Durotan meets with Llane secretly to unite the Frostwolf Clan and the humans against Gul'dan, but the group is ambushed by Blackhand. Medivh forms a magical barrier to protect the humans' retreat, but Lothar's son Callan is separated from the group and killed by Blackhand. Medivh is weakened, and Garona and Khadgar take him back to Karazhan to recover. Khadgar eventually realizes that Medivh is the one who helped Gul'dan, having been corrupted by fel magic. At the orc camp, Blackhand purges the Frostwolf Clan. Orgrim helps Draka to escape. After sending Go'el down a river in a basket, Draka is found and killed.

Durotan challenges Gul'dan to Mak'gora, a duel to the death for leadership of the orcs. During the fight, Gul'dan violates the honorable combat rules by draining the life out of Durotan with magic, killing him and earning the disapproval of the orcs watching. He then empowers Blackhand with the same magic. Medivh, now in a half-demonic state, starts to open the portal to Draenor, and Gul'dan begins sacrificing the captured humans to allow the rest of the Horde to enter Azeroth. Llane leads the human army in an assault on the orc camp, while Lothar and Khadgar fight Medivh and destroy the demon that began to manifest on the outside. Medivh is mortally wounded, and uses the last of his strength to close the portal to Draenor. He then opens a portal to Stormwind, allowing Llane to evacuate most of the freed prisoners. Medivh dies and the portal closes, leaving Llane, Garona, and a small number of human soldiers to fight the orcs. Llane secretly orders Garona to kill him, bringing her honor among the orcs and putting her in a position of power to bring peace between the two races. Garona reluctantly does so and is welcomed into the Horde by Gul'dan. Lothar arrives to retrieve King Llane's body, but is confronted by Blackhand, who challenges Lothar to Mak'gora, with Lothar defeating and killing him, avenging Callan's death. Against Gul'dan's demands, the orcs, bound by tradition, allow Lothar to depart with Llane's body.

During Llane's funeral, the leaders of the other human nations, along with the high elves and dwarves, proclaim an alliance against the orcs and support Lothar as the leader of the Alliance. Elsewhere, Orgrim takes one of Durotan's tusks to one day give to Go'el. The basket containing Go'el is found by a human.

== Cast ==
- Travis Fimmel as Anduin Lothar, the military commander of the human forces at Stormwind Kingdom in Azeroth. Steadfast and charismatic, Lothar is a knight who has sacrificed everything to keep the king and his people safe.
- Paula Patton as Garona, a strong-willed half-orc caught between the war of orcs and humans.
- Ben Foster as Medivh, the Guardian of Azeroth and a mysterious and reclusive protector who wields formidable magical power.
- Dominic Cooper as King Llane Wrynn, the ruler of the Stormwind Kingdom in Azeroth and a beacon of hope for his people in times of darkness, and Lothar's brother-in-law.
- Toby Kebbell as Durotan, a noble orc chieftain of the Frostwolf Clan and the father of Go'el. He fights to save his clan and the rest of the renegade orcs from Gul'dan and the destruction of their world. Kebbell also portrays the Archmage Antonidas, leader of the Kirin Tor, the mage council of Dalaran.
- Ben Schnetzer as Khadgar, a gifted young mage who was trained at a young age by the Kirin Tor to succeed Medivh as Guardian, but left and eventually found his place in the Stormwind Kingdom.
- Robert Kazinsky as Orgrim Doomhammer, Durotan's best friend and second-in-command of the Frostwolf Clan.
- Daniel Wu as Gul'dan, a sinister orc warlock who is the founder and leader of the Horde, wielding powerful fel magic and driven by his ravenous desire for power.
- Ruth Negga as Queen Taria, Queen of Stormwind, King Llane's wife and Anduin's sister.
- Anna Galvin as Draka, Durotan's mate and the mother of Go'el.
- Callum Keith Rennie as Moroes, the caretaker of Karazhan and Medivh's assistant.
- Burkely Duffield as Callan, Lothar's son
- Ryan Robbins as Karos
- Dean Redman as Varis/caged Frostwolf
- Clancy Brown as Blackhand, the fearsome orc chieftain of the Blackrock Clan and puppet of Gul'dan.

In addition, Terry Notary provides the voice and motion-capture for Grommash Hellscream, the orc chieftain of the Warsong Clan, though the part is listed in the credits as Peon. Notary also served as stunt coordinator and movement coach for the film, working with cast members Kebbell, Kazinsky, Brown, Wu and Galvin on their portrayals of the orcs, and with Foster on his portrayals of magic. Michael Adamthwaite appears as King Magni Bronzebeard, the dwarf ruler of Ironforge.

Glenn Close makes an uncredited appearance as Alodi, an ancient mage locked in an artifact within Dalaran, described as "the Guardian before there was a Guardian". In the comics, Alodi was the first Guardian of Tirisfal and a male half-elf, while the character in the film is closer to that of Aegwynn, Medivh's mother. Chris Metzen, who served as a co-producer and uncredited story writer for the film, and is the Senior Vice-president of Story and Franchise Development at Blizzard Entertainment and the voice of Thrall in the Warcraft franchise, makes an uncredited cameo appearance as a turbaned perfume vendor on the streets of Stormwind Kingdom.

== Production ==
=== Development and pre-production ===
The project was officially announced in May 2006 with Blizzard initially wanting it to be set in the universe of the real-time strategy Warcraft: Orcs and Humans video game from 1994. This setting was later dropped because Blizzard decided that it would be too similar to The Lord of the Rings. Initially scheduled for a 2009 release, the film would not see a release in that year. By Comic-Con 2011, the film was announced to still only be in the development stage.

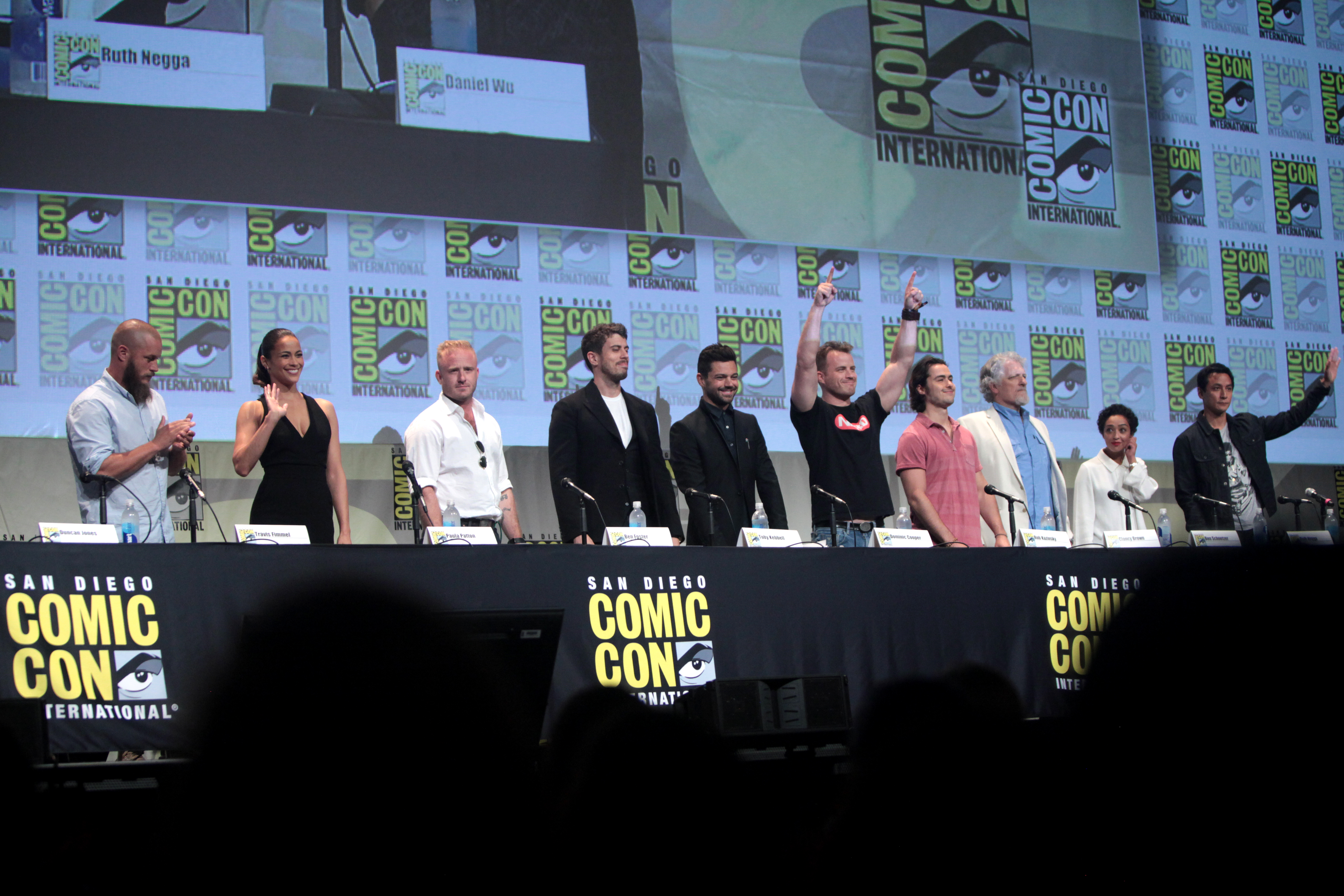
The cast of Warcraft at the 2015 San Diego Comic-Con to promote the film

Uwe Boll made a bid to direct, but was turned away by Blizzard, who he claims to have said, "We will not sell the movie rights, not to you… especially not to you. Because it's such a big online game success, maybe a bad movie would destroy that ongoing income, what the company has with it." Sam Raimi was initially attached to direct, but was replaced by Duncan Jones in January 2013. Upon coming aboard, Jones immediately voiced his displeasure at the script, which he stated "was the stale fantasy trope of, humans are the good guys, monsters are the bad guys". With Blizzard's approval (who had also been looking to change the story), Jones altered the story so that "It's 50-50." Jones also faced personal struggles during filming, as his wife was diagnosed with breast cancer soon after Jones took over, and his father, David Bowie, died from cancer late in production. Jones thus summed up the challenge by telling The New York Times, "My film started and ended with cancer." At San Diego Comic-Con in July 2013, a concept trailer was presented, featuring a battle between a human and an orc.

Paul Dano, Travis Fimmel, Anson Mount, and Anton Yelchin emerged as the front-runners for the lead role, with Fimmel winning the role in October 2013. On December 4, 2013, the main cast of the film, consisting of Fimmel, Ben Foster, Paula Patton, Dominic Cooper, Toby Kebbell and Robert Kazinsky, was announced. Idina Menzel, Debbie Gibson, Julie Delpy, Alison Eastwood and Leighton Meester were also considered for the role of Garona Halforcen. On December 14, 2013, Universal added Daniel Wu and Clancy Brown to the cast. In early March 2014, newcomer Burkely Duffield joined the cast.

=== Filming ===
Principal photography began on January 13, 2014, and lasted for four months, finishing on May 23, 2014. Filming took place primarily in Vancouver, among other locations. Post-production lasted twenty months. Regarding the use of computer-generated imagery, Jones said, "It's a tool like any other. It can be done well and it can be done shit. The best CGI has you forgetting [that] it's CGI, and accepting the visual as whatever it is supposed to be—like props. No one has an issue with props in film, do they?" Cinematographer Simon Duggan stated the film had a long prep of about 12 weeks, in addition to the 18 weeks of shooting.

=== Music ===
Warcraft: Original Motion Picture Soundtrack is the soundtrack. This music was composed by Ramin Djawadi and released on June 10, 2016. Djawadi was hired by Jones and Legendary Pictures in October 2014. The vinyl version of the soundtrack was released on September 5, 2016.

== Release ==
=== Theatrical ===
Warcraft was set to be released on December 18, 2015, but following the announcement of the coinciding release of Star Wars: The Force Awakens, the release was pushed back to the following year. The film premiered at the Le Grand Rex in Paris on May 24, 2016. It was released in the United Kingdom on May 30, 2016, in the United States on June 10, 2016 and in Australia on June 16, 2016.

=== Home media ===
Warcraft was released on digital download on September 13, 2016, and on Blu-ray, Ultra HD Blu-ray, Blu-ray 3D and DVD on September 27 in the United States and Canada. Select editions of the physical release include a digital copy of World of Warcraft along with digital bonus codes for other Blizzard games to tie in with the film.

== Reception ==
=== Box office ===
Warcraft grossed $47.4 million in the United States, and $391.7 million in other countries (including $225.5 million in China), for a worldwide total of $439.1 million. Given its $160 million production budget and additional $110 million spent on promotions, the film needed to earn $450–500 million in order to break even. In July 2016, The Hollywood Reporter said the film lost the studio around $15 million, although noted several executives put the losses in the $30–40 million range. Worldwide, it became the highest-grossing film based on a video game until it was surpassed by The Super Mario Bros. Movie in 2023. It was the first video game film to cross $400 million in ticket sales globally, and was also only the second Hollywood release (after Terminator Genisys) to earn $100 million in China without making $100 million in the United States.

In the United States and Canada, Warcraft opened on June 10, 2016, alongside The Conjuring 2 and Now You See Me 2, and was projected to gross around $25 million in its opening weekend from 3,400 theaters. Variety reported that the film was generating only moderate interest among U.S. moviegoers, which could possibly hurt its box office performance stateside, with poor reviews and competition from the aforementioned films and Teenage Mutant Ninja Turtles: Out of the Shadows (released the week prior) also affecting its performance. The film grossed $3.1 million in its Thursday night previews and $10.7 million on its first day. It went on to gross $24.2 million, finishing second at the box office behind The Conjuring 2 ($40.4 million). It fell by 70% on its second weekend, earning $7.2 million.

=== Critical response ===
On Rotten Tomatoes the film has an approval rating of 29% based on 233 reviews with an average rating of 4.4/10. The website's critical consensus reads, "Warcraft has visual thrills to spare, but they – and director Duncan Jones' distinctive gifts – are wasted on a sluggish and derivative adaptation of a bestselling game with little evident cinematic value." On Metacritic, the film has a score of 32 out of 100 based on 40 critics, indicating "generally unfavorable reviews". Audiences polled by CinemaScore gave the film an average grade of "B+" on an A+ to F scale.

Geoff Berkshire of Variety criticized the film's attempts at adapting a source material with "inherent ridiculousness" with regard to how the original game series was not meant to have a very deep narrative: "[I]t's an unwaveringly earnest film that never owns up to exactly how campy every character, every conflict and every new realm truly is." A.A. Dowd of The A.V. Club wrote that, "To watch Warcraft is never to be transported, but to wade through a thick morass of mythology, exposition, gaudy light-show effects, half-assed character development, and formulaic franchise groundwork," while describing director/cowriter Duncan Jones as "a talented sci-fi fabulist who's fallen screaming into the same CGI abyss that consumed Peter Jackson during his unfortunate Hobbit cycle." Helen O'Hara, reviewing for British GQ, stated that although the film itself is a "strong adaptation" of Warcraft, the script diminishes the film's impact: "The problem is that it just can't escape those cod-fantasy roots. There are too many mysterious proper nouns being thrown into conversation and at least 12 major characters competing for space … [W]e're zipping from one to another here so quickly that they only have time for the most portentous, and sometimes clichéd, dialogue."

Sheri Linden of The Hollywood Reporter gave the film a positive review, citing the performances and story as highlights. Brian Truitt of USA Today also praised the acting, particularly Kebbell's performance as Durotan. "Kebbell's performance showcases the nuances of a father gripped by the no-win situation of having no home and his family in constant danger." Truitt also stated that he found it was not necessary for viewers of the film to have prior knowledge of the Warcraft series to enjoy the film.

Stephanie Zacharek of Time singled out Patton's performance as Garona as one of the film's stronger elements, writing that Patton had one of the film's largest roles and gave a more nuanced performance than the surrounding spectacle allowed, although she also noted that the character's prosthetic fangs affected Patton's line delivery. Richard Lawson of Vanity Fair, by contrast, argued that the film's large cast and shifting plotlines left characters such as Garona underdeveloped, saying that the actors were forced to build characters from scattered material.

=== Accolades ===
Award	Date of ceremony	Category	Recipients	Result	Ref.
Annie Award	February 4, 2017	Outstanding Achievement, Animated Effects in a Live Action Production	John Hansen, George Kuruvilla, Alexis Hall, Gordon Chapman and Ben O’Brien	Nominated	
Annie Award	February 4, 2017	Outstanding Achievement, Character Animation in a Live Action Production	Orcs - Hal Hickel, Jee Young Park, Kai-Hua Lan, Cedric Lo and KimHuat Ooi	Nominated	
Visual Effects Society Awards	February 7, 2017	Outstanding Animated Performance in a Photoreal Feature	Durotan – Sunny Wei, Brian Cantwell, Brian Paik, Jee Young Park	Nominated	

== Future ==
With the film's storyline leaving Warcraft open to possible sequels, Jones has expressed interest in a sequel to the film, likely to be adapted from Warcraft II: Tides of Darkness, the second video game in the Warcraft franchise. On June 18, 2018, Jones tweeted that the chance of Warcraft getting a sequel "doesn't look good". In September 2020, it was reported that Legendary is developing a new Warcraft film, though it was unclear if this is a planned reboot or a sequel to Jones' film, or if it will continue to be distributed by Universal Pictures or transferred to Legendary's current release partners Paramount Pictures, Warner Bros. or Netflix.

== See also ==
- List of films based on video games
