= Medivh =

Fictional character in the Warcraft franchise

- Warcraft character
- Concept art of Medivh's appearance in Warcraft III: Reign of Chaos, by Samwise Didier
- First appearance: Warcraft: Orcs & Humans (1994)
- Created by: Blizzard Entertainment
- Portrayed by: Ben Foster (Warcraft)
- Voiced by: Michael Bell; Cam Clarke

In-universe information
- Title: Guardian of Tirisfal
- Weapon: Atiesh, Greatstaff of the Guardian
- Family: Aegwynn (mother); Med'an (son)
- Significant other: Garona

Medivh is a fictional character in Blizzard Entertainment's Warcraft media franchise. Medivh was introduced in Warcraft: Orcs & Humans by Blizzard Entertainment as a powerful human sorcerer whose corruption allowed a horde of orcs from the world of Draenor to invade Azeroth.

The character's background was later expanded in Jeff Grubb's novel Warcraft: The Last Guardian, which presents Medivh through the perspective of his apprentice Khadgar; he is revealed as the last Guardian of Tirisfal, a line of magically empowered protectors charged with defending the world of Azeroth from demonic threats. Medivh's redemptive arc was developed in Warcraft III: Reign of Chaos, where he appears as a wandering prophet seeking redemption for his past actions rather than as a treacherous villain. He guides the humans, orcs, and night elves into an alliance against the Burning Legion. His playable iteration in Heroes of the Storm attracted particular attention as a niche specialist character whose value depended heavily on coordination with teammates. Medivh's other appearances include World of Warcraft and Hearthstone. The character was portrayed by Ben Foster in the 2016 live-action film Warcraft.

Critical commentary on Medivh has focused on his role as a corrupted guardian of humanity, his connection to the franchise's origin story, and his unusual implementation as a utility-focused playable character in Heroes of the Storm.

== Concept and development ==
In Medivh's original presentation in Warcraft: Orcs & Humans, his background differed substantially from the mythology developed in later works. The game's manual describes him as the son of the royal court's Conjurer and a mysterious traveller. Upon reaching adulthood, Medivh suffers an uncontrolled eruption of magical power that kills his father and leaves him in a prolonged sleep at Northshire Abbey. After awakening, he initially claims to have mastered his abilities, but the traveller later warns King Llane that Medivh's growing power has driven him insane. In this version of the story, the gateway through which the orcs entered Azeroth was opened inadvertently during Medivh's childhood magical outburst; although responsible for their arrival, he is described as being unable to control them.

For the 2016 film adaptation, Ben Foster was cast as Medivh. In an interview with IGN, Foster identified his character as Medivh and described him as a mage who had protected an area through magic before being drawn back into conflict. Former Blizzard artist Wei Wang published concept illustrations for the film version of Medivh on ArtStation, describing them as concept and illustration work for the Warcraft film made between 2013 and 2015.

Blizzard returned to Medivh's tower Karazhan in World of Warcraft: Legion with the 2016 dungeon "Return to Karazhan". In an official dungeon preview, Blizzard said the development team had long discussed revisiting the location as a legacy dungeon. The preview framed the update as a natural fit for Legion because of the tower's connection to the Guardians and the Burning Legion, and said the team wanted the dungeon to combine nostalgia with surprise while preserving parts of the original tower and altering later areas with less predictable magical spaces.

Blizzard adapted Medivh into Heroes of the Storm as a playable character. This version is described as a ranged Specialist who could manipulate the battlefield with portals and become an invulnerable raven. The company said that the positional information gained from Raven Form could help allied characters attack enemies hidden behind terrain or structures. Blizzard later reworked Medivh in 2018, describing him as a challenging hero who excelled "in the right hands" and saying that the update was intended to create more opportunities for skilled play while reducing frustration for opponents. The rework changed Force of Will, made Master's Touch a baseline quest, and altered several of his talents.

== Appearances ==
=== Warcraft video games ===
Medivh first appears in Warcraft: Orcs & Humans, where he is central to the conflict between humans and orcs known as the First War. In the Human campaign's eighth mission, the player is ordered to lead a party into Medivh's tower Karazhan and kill him. The mission briefing portrays Medivh as an evil warlock who has begun draining power from the land to strengthen himself, and warns that he is capable of summoning demons. Later works substantially expanded the circumstances surrounding his corruption and death, identifying him as the Guardian of Tirisfal who is expected to protect Azeroth, but his possession by Sargeras causes him to assist the warlock Gul'dan in opening the Dark Portal to Draenor. This allows the Horde to invade Azeroth and sets the wider conflict of the Warcraft series in motion.

Medivh returns in Warcraft III: Reign of Chaos as a mysterious prophet-like figure who conceals his true identity and demonstrates the ability to shapeshift into a raven. He warns King Terenas Menethil and the human kingdoms of Azeroth about the coming demonic invasion, but his warnings are routinely dismissed. He later convinces Thrall and Jaina Proudmoore, leaders of their respective orc and human factions, to travel to Kalimdor where they eventually join with the native night elves to resist the Legion at Mount Hyjal. After the Legion's defeat, Medivh departs, stating that the world no longer needs guardianship in the same form.

Karazhan appears in World of Warcraft: The Burning Crusade as a raid location. Medivh reemerges in World of Warcraft: Legion, where he appears to Khadgar during the Legion's attempt to use Karazhan. Medivh assists Khadgar in stopping the incursion but refuses to take the role of Guardian back for himself, instead implying that Khadgar already has the qualities needed to defend Azeroth.

=== Other appearances ===
In Warcraft: The Last Guardian Medivh is shown living in the tower of Karazhan, where Khadgar is sent to become his apprentice. The novel expands upon Medivh's lore as the son of Aegwynn, the previous Guardian of Tirisfal who fought and seemingly defeated Sargeras; unbeknownst to her, Sargeras used the opportunity to corrupt an unborn Medivh. Khadgar eventually discovers Medivh's role in opening the Dark Portal, and that Medivh is under an evil influence. Khadgar allies with Anduin Lothar to confront him, and Medivh is killed.

Medivh appears in Hearthstone, including through cards and content connected to the Karazhan setting. Medivh was central to the 2016 adventure One Night in Karazhan, which framed him as the host of a magical party in Karazhan and introduced him through the adventure's free prologue mission.

Medivh appears as a playable hero in Heroes of the Storm. He is a utility-focused Specialist whose main role is to support teammates through scouting, shielding, and portals. Unlike most heroes in the game, Medivh does not use a conventional mount; his Raven Form lets him fly over terrain while invulnerable and scout the fog of war, reinforcing his role as a character built around information and team movement.

Medivh appears in the 2016 film Warcraft, where he is portrayed by Ben Foster. In the film, he is the Guardian of Azeroth and a powerful but reclusive mage based in Karazhan. The human characters initially seek his help after detecting fel magic, but Khadgar later discovers that Medivh has been corrupted and helped the orcs enter Azeroth.

Med'an, Medivh's son with his lover Garona, appears as a major character in the later run of the monthly World of Warcraft comic series published by WildStorm/DC Comics.

== Reception ==
Medivh's implementation as a playable character in Heroes of the Storm attracted attention because of his unusual design. In a preview of the character, Tom Marks of PC Gamer described him as an unusual addition to the game because his abilities focused on shields, portals, and team coordination rather than direct damage, making his effectiveness depend heavily on organised team play. Mark argued that Medivh's unlimited raven scouting and Portal ability could make him disruptive to the game's metagame, because coordinated teams could use him for map awareness, movement, and protection rather than conventional damage output. Hannah Dwan of PC Gamer wrote that Medivh was almost entirely focused on utility and had very little direct damage, making him difficult to balance and more effective for organised teams than for casual play. Dwan described him as a "fascinating" example of how Heroes of the Storm experimented with MOBA character design, but argued that his reliance on teamwork made him alienating for casual players. In a later guide, Dwan reiterated that Medivh's value as a Specialist is to provide utility for teammates rather than carry games himself, writing that choosing him required trust in the rest of the player's team.

Medivh's film adaptation received a mixed-to-negative response from film critics. In a review for RogerEbert.com, Christy Lemire argued that the film was overwhelmed by spectacle and exposition. Richard Lawson of Vanity Fair was more critical of Foster's performance, writing that he suffered the most among the cast and describing his portrayal of Medivh as an odd performance as a tormented wizard. Angela Watercutter of Wired wrote that Foster's Medivh, like Paula Patton's Garona, showed effort from the actor, but argued that the film's visual spectacle and lack of character depth overwhelmed the performances.

=== Analysis ===
Retrospective commentary has treated Medivh as a foundational figure in the history of Azeroth because of his role in opening the Dark Portal and later helping to unite the world's defenders against the Burning Legion. In Engadget, Matthew Rossi summarized Medivh as both the corrupted Guardian whose fall enabled the First War and the redeemed prophet whose later actions helped defeat the Legion.

William Sims Bainbridge discussed Medivh in The Warcraft Civilization, using the character's dialogue with Khadgar in The Last Guardian as part of an analysis of how World of Warcraft rationalizes magic through quasi-natural laws. In World of Warcraft and Philosophy, Phil Serchuk used Medivh's opening of the Dark Portal as a case study in utilitarian ethics, arguing that the resulting First War created far more suffering than happiness and therefore would be immoral under act utilitarian reasoning. A theological study of religious themes in World of Warcraft used Medivh's possession by Sargeras as an example of the game's body-and-soul dualism, describing the narrative as one in which an evil spirit survives bodily death, possesses Medivh, and twists his thoughts and emotions toward invasion.
