= Garona =

Fictional character in the Warcraft franchise

- Warcraft character
- Artwork of Garona by Chris Metzen
- First appearance: Warcraft: Orcs & Humans (1994)
- Portrayed by: Paula Patton

In-universe information
- Species: Half-orc and half-draenei Half-orc and half-human (film)
- Gender: Female
- Title: Halforcen
- Occupation: Spy

Garona Halforcen, or simply Garona, is a fictional character in Blizzard Entertainment's Warcraft media franchise. Introduced in the 1994 video game Warcraft: Orcs & Humans, she is a spy of mixed orc ancestry from the world of Draenor. Originally described as half-human and half-orc, her background was repeatedly revised in later works, which included her ancestry being changed to the daughter of an orc and another native species of Draenor known as the draenei. Garona was enslaved and mentally conditioned by the orc warlock Gul'dan, who used her as an instrument of the Shadow Council and compelled her to infiltrate human society and assassinate the human ruler King Llane Wrynn.

Garona's story has been developed across video games, novels and comics. Her characterization centres on her uncertain ancestry, divided cultural identity and inability to trust her own body after years of coercion. Commentators have interpreted her as a victim who nevertheless assumes responsibility for actions imposed upon her and isolates herself from other people out of fear that she may again be controlled.

A separate version of Garona, portrayed by Paula Patton, appears in the 2016 film adaptation Warcraft. The film changes her ancestry to her original presentation as a half-human and half-orc individual, which positions her between the human and orc societies. Patton's performance was frequently identified as one of the film's strengths, although critics disagreed over whether Garona received meaningful development or was instead sexualized and inadequately explored. Her appearance also prompted discussion of the casting of women of colour as visually non-human characters in fantasy films.

== Concept and development ==
=== Original introduction and revisions ===
Garona was introduced in Warcraft: Orcs & Humans, whose manual gives her a prominent role in presenting the setting's early history. Its section "The Destiny of the Orcish Hordes" is framed as an account written by "Garona of the Shadow Council". In its introduction, Garona contrasts her history with the crude records left by earlier orc chieftains, describes herself as being of both orc and human lineage, and states that the skills and schooling acquired during her travels elevated her to the position of chief interpreter to the Shadow Council. She subsequently narrates the Horde's conquests, internal conflicts and preparations for the invasion of the human lands in the first person.

During early development of Warcraft III: Reign of Chaos, producer Rob Pardo identified Garona and Thrall as examples of named heroes who would persist throughout the game and be controlled by the player. Garona was not included in the released version. At BlizzCon 2007, Blizzard creative director Chris Metzen said that he wanted to make Garona relevant to the Warcraft universe again. He proposed that she might become a senior maternal figure within orc society or a partner for Thrall, but emphasized that these were personal ideas that had not been approved for development. Neither proposal was used.

Blizzard subsequently returned to the character through the World of Warcraft comic series. In 2009, Blizzard writer Micky Neilson said that the comic's second story arc had been designed to answer questions about Garona's background and explain why she had committed certain acts. Metzen described Blizzard as having only recently begun to use the character again and said there was continued interest in developing her.

The comic revised Garona's non-orc ancestry from human to draenei, a species of extraterrestrial origin that lived in peace with the orcs of the world of Draenor for generations, and depicted her as the result of an experiment arranged by Gul'dan. It established that she had been magically aged, tortured and conditioned to obey the Shadow Council. World of Warcraft: Chronicle Volume 2 revised this account again. In the later version, Garona was naturally born to a captive draenei woman and an orc warrior and encountered Gul'dan only after surviving the destruction of her clan. Gul'dan then bound her mind, trained her as an assassin and used magic to accelerate her maturation.

=== Film adaptation ===
Director Duncan Jones sought to tell the film's conflict from both human and orc perspectives rather than depict either population as uniformly good or evil. He described the principal figures on each side as noble and empathetic, with their own cultures and understandable motivations. Garona's divided loyalties were made an important connection between the two narratives.

Patton accepted the part after reading the screenplay and meeting Jones. She had not played the Warcraft games and instead researched the character through books and other background material before creating her own interpretation. Patton said that she was drawn to Garona's position as a survivor who belonged fully to neither the human nor orc society.

For the film's separate continuity, Garona was changed from half-orc and half-draenei to half-orc and half-human. Patton said that Blizzard approved the change because it made sense for the film's treatment of her relationship with the human characters. She interpreted Garona's progression from Gul'dan's slave to a person able to determine her own allegiance as the character's central development. Patton also connected Garona's uncertainty about her identity with her own evolving understanding of being biracial and believed that the character could speak to people who felt that they did not belong within a single community.

Patton trained for approximately two and a half hours a day, six days a week, to acquire the physique requested by Jones. Her preparation included sword and knife fighting, boxing, horse riding and stunt work. She said that completing the physical training helped her understand Garona as a warrior rather than merely imitate one during filming.

Several shades of green, hairstyles and wigs were tested during pre-production. The filmmakers ultimately decided not to cover Patton with green makeup and instead altered her skin digitally so that details such as pores, perspiration and facial movement remained visible. Patton wore practical prosthetic tusks and contact lenses. Although the lenses restricted her vision, she retained them because the resulting disorientation helped her feel less human while performing. Visual-effects artists isolated and recoloured Patton's exposed skin in each shot, adjusting the result to surrounding light and environmental conditions.

== Appearances ==
=== Main continuity ===
In Warcraft: Orcs & Humans, Garona serves as the chief interpreter of the Shadow Council and an emissary between the invading orcs and the humans of Azeroth. Although her position gives her access to the council's leadership, she remains an agent of Gul'dan and is treated with suspicion by other orcs because of her apparent human ancestry.

The novel The Last Guardian expands her role during the First War. Garona is sent to spy on the human mage Medivh at Karazhan, where she meets his apprentice Khadgar. Garona and Khadgar initially distrust one another but cooperate as Medivh's behaviour becomes increasingly unstable. Magical visions reveal Medivh's role in opening the Dark Portal and show Garona that she will eventually murder King Llane, despite the friendship she develops with him.

After Medivh's defeat, Garona is compelled by the Shadow Council to assassinate Llane. She is subsequently captured and tortured into revealing the council's location. The later comic series reveals that Medivh and Garona had a son, Med'an, whom Garona left in the care of the mage Meryl Winterstorm. She believed that remaining near her son would expose him to her enemies and create another opportunity for the Shadow Council to use her against someone she loved.

Garona later hunts the ogre mage Cho'gall, one of the surviving leaders of the Shadow Council. She joins Med'an and the reconstituted Council of Tirisfal in opposing Cho'gall and the Twilight's Hammer. She subsequently appears in World of Warcraft: Cataclysm, where she participates in the campaign against Cho'gall in the Twilight Highlands.

In World of Warcraft: Legion, Garona becomes a member of the Uncrowned, a secret organization of rogues, and can be recruited as a champion by rogue player characters. During World of Warcraft: Battle for Azeroth, Warchief Sylvanas Windrunner conscripts her to coordinate Horde intelligence operations. Garona privately states that she is complying to survive rather than from loyalty to Sylvanas.

=== Alternate Draenor ===
An alternate version of Garona appears in World of Warcraft: Warlords of Draenor, which takes place in a divergent version of Draenor's past. This incarnation remains under Gul'dan's mental control and is ordered to assassinate Khadgar. After Khadgar and the player break Gul'dan's influence, Garona assists them in pursuing the warlock and can be recruited as a follower.

=== Film ===
In Warcraft, Garona is an enslaved half-orc and half-human who accompanies Gul'dan's Horde through the portal to Azeroth. After being captured by human soldiers, she becomes an interpreter for King Llane, Anduin Lothar and Khadgar. Her knowledge of the orcs assists the humans, while learning of her human ancestry and receiving kindness from Llane's court cause her to reconsider her allegiance.

Garona develops a friendship with Queen Taria and an implied romantic attachment to Lothar. During the humans' defeat at the Dark Portal, Llane asks Garona to kill him. He reasons that the orcs will regard her as a hero for killing their enemy and that her resulting influence will allow her to oppose Gul'dan from within the Horde. Garona complies and is accepted by the witnessing orcs, although the film does not resolve how she uses her new position.

== Reception ==
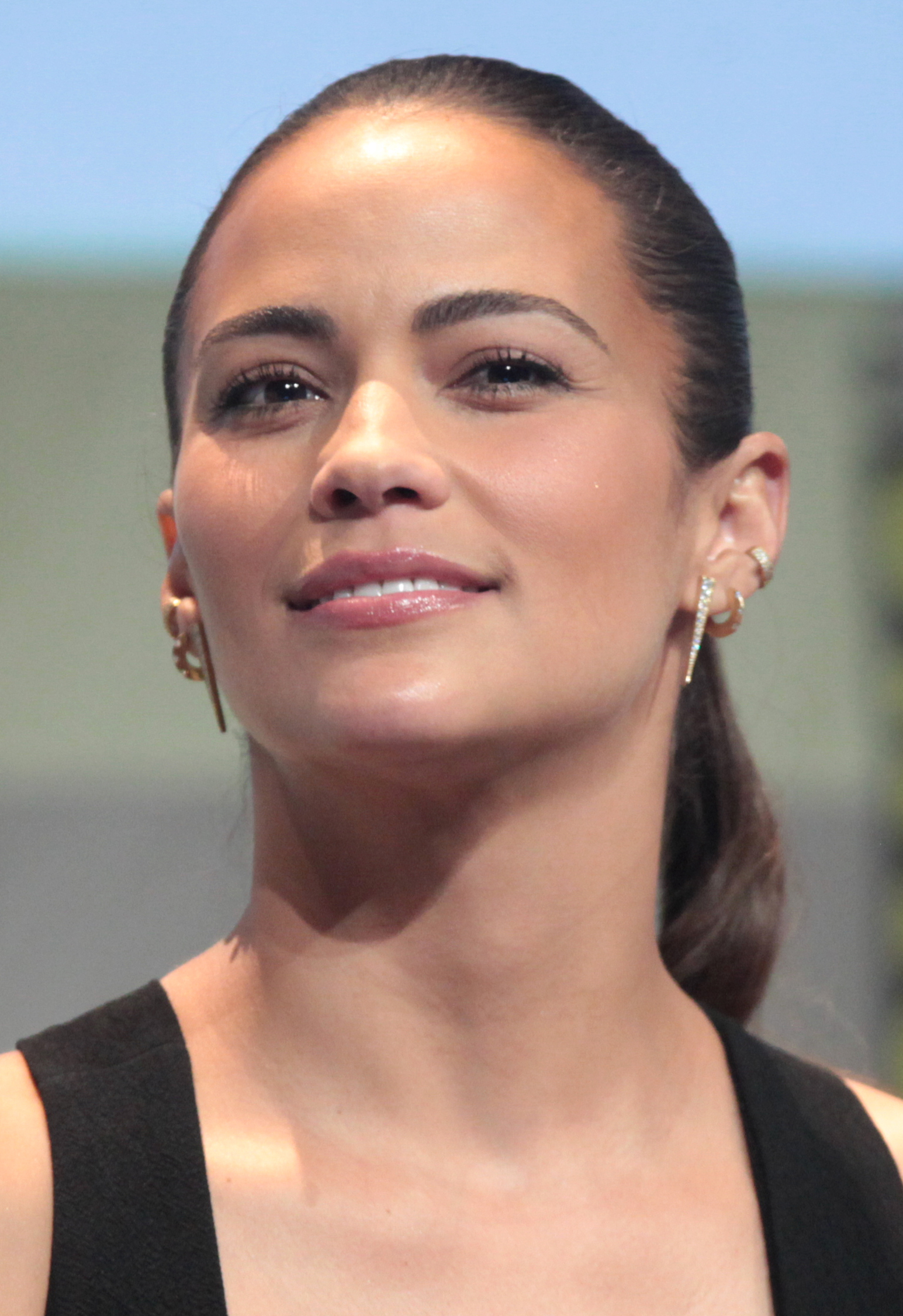
Paula Patton received a mostly positive reception for her portrayal of Garona

Critical responses to the film incarnation of Garona were generally more favourable than responses to the film as a whole. Stephanie Zacharek of Time called Patton the principal reason to watch the film and praised her for producing a nuanced performance from limited material. Zacharek considered Garona the only character whose future remained interesting at the film's conclusion, although she found that the prosthetic tusks interfered with Patton's delivery. In his review for The Guardian, Rose described Garona as one of the story's most intriguing characters and a warrior concealing a traumatic past. He nevertheless concluded that the number of competing plotlines prevented the film from developing her adequately and also criticized the effect of her prosthetic tusks on Patton's speech. Carrie Vaughn of Lightspeed Magazine considered Garona an interesting and comparatively developed character. Vaughn praised the film for referring to Garona's history of abuse without dwelling on it voyeuristically and for depicting Queen Taria responding to her with sympathy. She regarded the absence of a conventional rivalry between the two women as one of the film's more successful character choices.

Angela Watercutter of Wired singled out Patton and Ben Foster, who played Medivh, as performers who appeared to be trying to construct characters within an otherwise shallow film. She nevertheless considered Garona, like the rest of the cast, insufficiently developed beyond an archetype. Richard Lawson of Vanity Fair was similarly critical, arguing that the film divided its attention among so many characters that neither Garona nor any other member of the ensemble emerged as a convincing individual.

Christy Lemire of RogerEbert.com criticized the film's presentation of an enslaved woman in chains and revealing clothing. She argued that Garona was used for sexual appeal while the potentially meaningful implications of her mixed ancestry and marginal position within both societies were left largely unexplored.

== Analysis ==
=== Coercion and identity ===
Anne Stickney of Engadget identified coercion and loss of bodily autonomy as the central elements of Garona's characterization. Stickney described her as someone deliberately reduced to an instrument by the Shadow Council: her age, education, loyalties and understanding of her ancestry were manipulated to produce an effective assassin. Garona's intelligence and ability to move between cultures give her apparent independence, but her conditioning allows the council to override her conscious decisions.

Stickney interpreted Llane's assassination as the point at which Garona realizes that she cannot rely on her own body. Although Garona knows that the killing was imposed upon her, she continues to regard herself as responsible. Her fear of again losing control informs her decision to leave Med'an with others: isolation becomes both a punishment she imposes on herself and a method of protecting her son.

The revisions to Garona's ancestry reinforce this instability. Stickney argued that learning the Shadow Council had constructed much of her personal history deprived Garona even of a secure account of who she was. The conflict between imposed identity and self-determination consequently continues after her direct conditioning is removed. Stickney also regarded Garona's disappearance before the principal confrontation with Cho'gall as a conspicuous failure to resolve an arc built around her efforts to confront those responsible for her abuse.

=== Race and gender ===
Before the film's release, Steve Rose of The Guardian described Garona as its prospective bridge between two cultures but placed Patton's casting within a recurring pattern in fantasy and science-fiction films. He compared Garona with Zoe Saldaña's performances as Neytiri and Gamora, observing that prominent Black or mixed-race actresses were repeatedly transformed into blue- or green-skinned non-human characters through makeup, prosthetics or digital effects. Rose argued that the device allowed blockbusters to depict an ostensibly interracial relationship while displacing visible racial difference into fantasy biology.

Justin Chang of the Los Angeles Times similarly compared Patton's appearance with Gamora and connected it with the film's uncertain racial politics. Chang regarded Garona as the film's most conflicted major character, moving from contempt for the humans toward recognition of their vulnerability, but questioned the continuing practice of placing Black actresses beneath green makeup.
