= The Do-Over =

- Promotional poster
- Directed by: Steven Brill
- Written by: Kevin Barnett; Chris Pappas
- Produced by: Adam Sandler; Allen Covert; Kevin Grady; Ted Sarandos
- Starring: Adam Sandler; David Spade; Paula Patton; Kathryn Hahn; Luis Guzmán
- Cinematography: Dean Semler
- Edited by: Tom Costain
- Music by: Rupert Gregson-Williams
- Production company: Happy Madison Productions
- Distributed by: Netflix
- Release dates: May 16, 2016 (Los Angeles); May 27, 2016 (United States)
- Running time: 108 minutes
- Country: United States
- Language: English
- Budget: $40 million

The Do-Over is a 2016 American buddy action comedy film directed by Steven Brill, and written by Kevin Barnett and Chris Pappas. The movie follows Charlie (David Spade) and Max (Adam Sandler) after Max fakes their deaths in order to start their lives anew. Things go awry when they discover that the dead men whose identities they have adopted were entangled in criminal activities. Paula Patton, Kathryn Hahn and Luis Guzmán also star.

The film is the second in a four-film deal between Sandler and Netflix. The film was released worldwide on Netflix on May 27, 2016.

== Plot ==
Charlie lives in Florida with his materialistic wife, Nikki and her two unpleasant twin sons from her ex husband, Ted-O. He is a bank manager in a supermarket and Nikki is cheating on him with Ted-O. Charlie reunites with his old high school buddy (an FBI agent) Max at a high school reunion. They spend a weekend on a yacht Max rented, and Charlie feels young again.

Max blows up the yacht to fake their deaths. When Charlie comes to, Max tells him they can now both start over. He says he is not an FBI agent, but actually a coroner. This allowed him to use two unclaimed cadavers in their place; Charlie is now Dr. Ronald P. Fishman, and Max is Butch Ryder.

Initially appalled, Charlie soon realises a do over is appealing after witnessing his lackluster funeral, Nikki reconciling with Ted-O and the bank has quickly replaced him. Max tells Charlie that he found a key in Butch's rectum, which Charlie determines belongs to a Puerto Rican safe deposit box.

Traveling to Puerto Rico, the duo access Butch's safe deposit box, which contains money and the keys to a mansion with a Ferrari. They relocate there, befriending and later having an orgy with neighbours Dawn and Joan during which Dawn reveals the original Butch and Ronald bought the mansion in a hurry, implying they were on the run.

They discover Ronald was married after seeing a picture of his wife on Butch's tablet. At the mansion, Max and Charlie are attacked by assassins led by The Gymnast. They escape, and Max admits he's not a coroner, but actually a guidance counselor.

They track down Ronald's widow Heather at her home in Savannah, Georgia. The duo explain that Ronald was murdered and believe Butch got him entangled in criminal activity. Heather discloses that Ronald's study was recently broken into.

The trio head to a biker bar where Ronald and Butch hung out. There, they learn from the biker Dakota, that Butch had stage four cancer. They had begun conducting secret, non-FDA approved clinical trials Ronald's "magic bullet" cancer treatment. Ronald's financier Shecky withdrew funding, so Butch started robbing banks, making him wanted by the FBI.

After Dakota reveals that Ronald and Butch had an affair, he is then shot by The Gymnast. The trio escape to Max's mother's where they are stalked by Max's ex, Becca, and Charlie ends up having sex with Heather.

The trio pay a visit to Shecky, who reveals that his house was also broken into recently. The trio leave, deducing the cancer treatment formula is why men tried to kill them and broke into their homes. Charlie says they should forfeit it when they find it, which angers Max. While hacking Ronald's computer, Charlie discovers Max was one of Ronald's cancer patients. He also learns that Max and Becca have a young son, and realizes Max needs the cure to save his own life.

Returning to Shecky's, Max thinks he is withholding the cure. Shecky has been shot, but before he dies, reveals the assassins were hired by Trojgaard, the world's largest chemotherapy company, to steal the cure and bury it. The Gymnast, still in the house, takes Max hostage.

Meanwhile, Charlie realises the Jenga app on Butch's tablet actually holds the cure. He attempts to call Max, but The Gymnast destroys his phone as he tortures him. Heather then arrives at Shecky's, telling Max that she not only accepted a fortune from Trojgaard to bury the formula when Ronald refused, but also killed Ronald and Butch.

Heather calls Charlie, who claims Max killed Shecky. They meet up and Charlie, realizing she's lying, punches her in the face. She then holds him at gunpoint but, before she can shoot, Max knocks her down. Heather then aims at them both, but Becca shows up, beats her unconscious, and recovers the tablet. The police arrive, and when they draw their weapons, Becca accidentally throws the tablet into the bay as she puts up her hands.

The tablet suffers irreparable damage, but Charlie backed up the formula on a USB, which he stored in his rectum. The men are pardoned for their crimes when they offer the cancer treatment as a bargaining chip. Charlie disguises himself with zombie makeup and gets revenge on Nikki, Ted-O and the twins. Charlie, Max, Becca, Max's son and mother returns to the mansion in Puerto Rico after Max is cured. The film ends with Charlie and Max jumping off a cliff into the sea.

== Cast ==
- Adam Sandler as Max
  - Ryder and Samuel Tardif as Young Max
- David Spade as Charlie
- Paula Patton as Heather
- Kathryn Hahn as Becca
- Nick Swardson as Bob
- Matt Walsh as Shecky
- Renée Taylor as Mrs. Kessler
- Sean Astin as Ted-O
- Natasha Leggero as Nikki
- Luis Guzmán as Jorge The Shooter Boy
- Catherine Bell as Dawn DeFazio
- Michael Chiklis as Carmine
- Torsten Voges as The Gymnast
- Stan Ellsworth as Dakota
- Dan Patrick as Auto Store Lou
- Jackie Sandler as Joan
- Jared Sandler as DJ
- Zakk and Xander Paradise as the twins

== Production ==
Principal photography on the film began in Savannah, Georgia on July 7, 2015, and it ended on August 21, 2015. Additional scenes were filmed in Puerto Rico.

== Release ==
The film was released worldwide on Netflix on May 27, 2016.

== Reception ==
On Rotten Tomatoes, the film holds an approval rating of 9% based on 23 reviews, with an average rating of 3.17/10. The website's critics consensus reads: "A dunderheaded story of mistaken identity, The Do-Over finds Adam Sandler and David Spade retreading old ground -- minus the comedic pep required to enliven the decidedly uninspired proceedings." On Metacritic, the film has a weighted average score of 22 out of 100, based on 11 critics, indicating "generally unfavorable reviews".

Keith Uhlich of The Hollywood Reporter panned the film, and wrote: "it's clear that every Adam Sandler movie is dada of the high-concept, low-hanging-fruit variety, in which the Happy Madison stock company uses filmmaking (loosely termed) as an excuse to take an extended tropical vacation." David Ehrlich of IndieWire gave the film a grade D− and called the film "atrocious in different ways than any of Adam Sandler's previous comedies". Ehrlich continued "more than two decades since Billy Madison minted Sandler as a leading man — this restless innovator is still finding new methods of making bad movies. For years, we’ve been asking Adam Sandler to try harder. We’ve been making a huge mistake."

Christian Holub of Entertainment Weekly gave the film a positive review: "The plot threads can be a little hard to follow, especially since most of them revolve around two unseen characters who are dead before the story even begins, but Sandler and Spade’s partnership gives the whole enterprise enough emotional grounding to make up for it."
