= Blackthorne =

1994 video game

- SNES box art
- Developer: Blizzard Entertainment (Note: Ported to 32X by Paradox Development)
- Publishers: Interplay Productions; Sega (32X)
- Producers: Ronald Millar Sr. Matthew Findley
- Designer: Ronald Millar Sr.
- Programmers: Frank Pearce Jr. Patrick Wyatt; Michael Morhaime (PC)
- Artists: Roman Kenney; Stuart Rose; Jason Magness; Ronald Millar Sr. Samwise Didier
- Writers: Micky Neilson; Ronald Millar Sr. Frank Pearce Jr.
- Composer: Glenn Stafford
- Platforms: Super NES, MS-DOS, 32X, Classic Mac OS, Game Boy Advance, Nintendo Switch, PlayStation 4, Windows, Xbox One
- Release: Super NES; September 1994; MS-DOS; December 19, 1994; 32X; September 1995; Mac; November 1996; Game Boy Advance; September 2003; Windows; November 2013; Switch, Windows, PS4, Xbox One; WW: February 20, 2021
- Genre: Platform
- Mode: Single-player

Blackthorne (released as Blackhawk in some European countries) is a cinematic platform game developed by Blizzard Entertainment. It was released for the Super NES and MS-DOS in 1994. The cover art for the SNES version was drawn by Jim Lee. The following year, Blackthorne was released for the 32X with additional content. In 2013, Blizzard released the game for free on their Battle.net PC client. In celebration of the company's 30th anniversary, Blackthorne was re-released for Nintendo Switch, PlayStation 4, Windows, and Xbox One as part of the Blizzard Arcade Collection in February 2021.

== Plot ==
Blackthorne is set on the planet Tuul, which has existed for centuries without human knowledge. All of this time, Tuul's people have been ruled over by a single shaman who "was blessed with all knowledge". Years before the game begins, Thoros, the latest ruler, finds it near impossible to choose between his two sons as the next ruler. Believing it will solve the dilemma, he leads them to the deserts and kills himself. His body becomes two stones, light and dark, and he gives one to each boy to rule their own kingdoms respectively. The people of the lightstone form the kingdom of Androth, and the people of the darkstone form Ka'dra'suul. But while Androth respects their stone, Ka'dra'suul reject theirs, and are eventually transformed into monsters by it. In this time, a ka'dra named Sarlac seizes power. He forms an army and leads them against Androth. Knowing of his people's doom, the ruler of Androth, King Vlaros, with the aid of the Androthi magician Galadril, sends his son Kyle to Earth to save his life. Vlaros also gives Kyle the lightstone for safe keeping.

Twenty years later, Kyle has become a renowned military captain and mercenary. After breaking out of prison facing court martial, Kyle begins having strange dreams, and is eventually confronted by Galadril. He is told that it is time to return to Tuul and save his people. The game begins here with Kyle setting out to kill Sarlac and reclaim his throne.

Kyle ventures through the land fighting his way to Sarlac's castle. He confronts Sarlac and threatens to keep his skull as a mounted trophy on his wall. The two battle and Kyle is the victor. He avenges his father, King Vlaros. Kyle then becomes king of Androth, where it is stated that he ruled justly, fairly and with honor for many years. The final shot of the game shows him sitting on the throne with a woman and Sarlac's former pet sitting next to him. Sarlac's skull is seen mounted on the wall as a trophy, just as Kyle had promised.

== Gameplay ==
The game focuses around protagonist Kyle "Blackthorne" Vlaros, out for revenge on Sarlac and his minions. The gameplay involves large platforming sequences, in which Kyle can run and climb around the environment, find keys and items and progress to the end of each maze-like level. Combat in Blackthorne takes the form of gunfights. Both Blackthorne and his enemies can press against walls to avoid incoming bullets. Blackthorne can also fire blindly behind himself. During the game, Kyle uses a pump-action shotgun as his primary weapon; notably, Blackthorne can fire backwards without turning around. As the game progresses, Androthi allies will help him upgrade the weapon, increasing its speed and power.

The game has seventeen levels within four areas—the mines of Androth, the Karrellian forests/swamps, the Wasteland desert and Shadow keep. The Sega 32X version includes a fifth area, the snowy mountains, which is not found in the other versions of the game. As the game progresses through these areas, Kyle becomes stronger and better armed, but so do the enemies.

== Development ==
The inspiration for Blackthorne came from Another World and Flashback. For the first versions, the sprites for game characters were done using rotoscoping techniques just like Prince of Persia, using over 1000 frames to get smooth, lifelike animation. The Macintosh version improved the quality by using prerendered, motion-captured sprites. Interplay had intended to port the game to Sega Genesis but instead did so for the Sega 32X. There were also plans to port the game to PlayStation and Sega Saturn, but those plans were cancelled. A 3DO version was showcased by Interplay at E3 1995, but the port was never released for unknown reasons.

The protagonist's name Kyle was inspired by Kyle Reese from the 1984 film The Terminator.

== Reception ==
Reception

Aggregate scores
Aggregator	Score
GameRankings	69% (GBA)
Metacritic	67/100 (GBA)

Review scores
Publication	Score
AllGame	4/5 (MAC)
Computer Gaming World	2/5 (DOS)
Electronic Gaming Monthly	8/10, 8/10, 8/10, 8/10 (SNES)
GameSpot	7/10 (GBA)
IGN	7.5/10 (GBA)
Next Generation	4/5 (DOS, MAC)

Electronic Gaming Monthly gave the SNES version their "Game of the Month" award, praising its dark tone, amazingly smooth animation, complex and intelligent gameplay, and the ability to kill prisoners after getting information from them. GamePro gave the SNES version a positive review, calling it "Flashback with an attitude". They particularly praised its detailed graphics and stronger emphasis on action over puzzle-solving as compared to similar games. Nintendo Power praised the game as "Total fun!" noting its animation and sound quality and stated that it had better play control than games like Out of This World, Prince of Persia and Flashback but was "still a bit slow".

They gave the 32X version a positive review as well, remarking that "with a solid graphical overhaul, Blackthorne delivers where many of the 16-bit conversions flounder in the 32X library".

A reviewer for Next Generation called Blackthorne "one of the best arcade-style games the [PC] has ever seen", citing the accessible and intelligent gameplay, smooth animation, and the "dark feel of the game". While noting that the game was over two years old by the time it was released for Macintosh, Next Generation gave this version a positive review as well, concluding that "at the very least, Blackthorne is one of the best—and only—action games to come out for the Macintosh in the last year".

IGN rated the game 90th on their "Top 100 SNES Games of All Time". In 2018, Complex placed Blackthorne at 96th in their "The Best Super Nintendo Games of All Time". In 1995, Total! ranked the game 49 on its Top 100 SNES Games, writing: "It's a bit like Flashback, only it's more action based. This lack of puzzling elements makes it slightly less intriguing, but it delivers a whole heap of atmosphere."
