= Kali (software) =

IPX network emulator for MS-DOS and Windows

- Type: IPX network emulator
- Website: sites.google.com/kali.net/kalinet

Kali is an IPX network emulator for MS-DOS and Windows, enabling legacy multiplayer games to work over a modern TCP/IP network such as the Internet. Later versions of the software also functioned as a server browser for games that natively supported TCP/IP. Versions were also created for OS2 and Mac, but neither version was well polished. Today, Kali's network is still operational but development has largely ceased.

Kali also includes an Internet Game Browser for TCP/IP native games, a buddy system, a chat system, and supports 400+ games including Doom 3, many of the Command & Conquer games, the Mechwarrior 2 series, Unreal Tournament 2004, Battlefield Vietnam, Counter-Strike: Condition Zero, and Master of Orion II.

The Kali software is free to download, and once had a time-based cap for unregistered versions. For a one-time $20 fee, the time restriction was removed. However, as of January 2023, Kali.net offers the download and a registration code generator on the website, so registration is currently free.

== History ==
The original MS-DOS version of Kali was created by Scott Coleman, Alex Markovich and Jay Cotton in the spring of 1995. It was the successor to a program called iDOOM (later Frag) that Cotton wrote so he could play id Software's DOS game DOOM over the Internet. After the release of Descent, Coleman, Markovich and Cotton wrote a new program to allow Descent, or any other game which supported LAN play using the IPX protocol, to be played over the Internet; this new program was named Kali. In the summer of 1995, Coleman went off to work for Interplay Productions, Markovich left the project and Cotton formed a new company, Kali Inc., to develop and market Kali. Cotton and his team developed the first Windows version (Kali95) and all subsequent versions.

Initially Kali appealed only to hardcore computer tinkerers, due to the difficulty of getting TCP/IP running on MS-DOS. Kali95 took advantage of the greater network support of Windows 95, allowing Kali to achieve mainstream popularity. In the mid-1990s, it was an extremely popular way to play Command & Conquer, Descent, Warcraft II: Tides of Darkness, Duke Nukem 3D, and other games over the Internet, with more than 50,000 users worldwide by the end of 1996. The fact that only a small one-time fee was charged for the service, rather than a monthly subscription, also contributed to its popularity. This was largely possible due to Kali's scaled-down services; it did not provide the contests and high-tech chat features offered by other leading online gaming services. Since it was the only way for Windows and DOS users to play Warcraft II: Tides of Darkness against people outside of a LAN or dial-up connection, Blizzard actually included a copy of the program on the CD, going so far as to also provide a customized executable (WAR2KALI.EXE) which optimized the game's network code to account for Internet latency and also allowed users to specify their own settings for packet transmission and handling.

During the height of IPX emulation's popularity, a competing product called "Kahn" was being sold by the now-defunct developer Stargate Networks for $15 ($5 cheaper than Kali at that time). However, Kali was already well-established by this point; existing users saw no reason to buy another piece of software, and new users were still attracted to Kali's larger user base, since the whole point of the software was to be able to play with other people. The minor cost savings proved largely ineffective against Kali, and Kahn never achieved much market share.

The market for Kali eventually dried up as games began to host their own online services, such as battle.net, MSN Gaming Zone, and also through direct TCP/IP connections, made easier by Microsoft's DirectPlay package. As IPX itself was phased out, Kali's unique emulation technology fell by the wayside and the software shifted its emphasis to becoming a game browser, a market where strong competitors such as GameSpy were already established.

In the early 2000s, Cotton decided to sell Kali to a company that would have the capital to expand the program. However, this move proved to be disastrous for Kali as the new company folded shortly after the purchase. A year later Cotton reacquired the rights to the Kali software and system. Since then he has resumed development and support of Kali.

As of 2009, the latest version of Kali is 2.613, which was released in February 2004. At present Kali works with over 400 games. Support has faded over the last years making usage of Kali harder and less effective.

Kali has gained new life, because the IPX protocol has been removed in all versions of Windows after XP.

As of 2014, the software has for the most part died. However, there is still a small, loyal following (largely residing in the Descent Channel) that uses the software as a chat room. Games, such as Descent, are still played among this group of gamers.

Currently (January 2023), the software and registration is offered on Kali.net at no cost.

== Reception ==
Kali won Computer Gaming World's 1996 "Special Award for Online-Enabling Technology". The editors called it "perhaps the most significant milestone so far in the nascent online gaming industry." It won Computer Games Strategy Plus's award for the best online service of 1996, beating Mpath and the T.E.N. service. Next Generation likewise named it number one on their "Top 10 Online Gaming Sites" in early 1997, citing the lack of subscription fees and the unsurpassed selection of games supported.
