= Paula Patton =

American actress (born 1975)

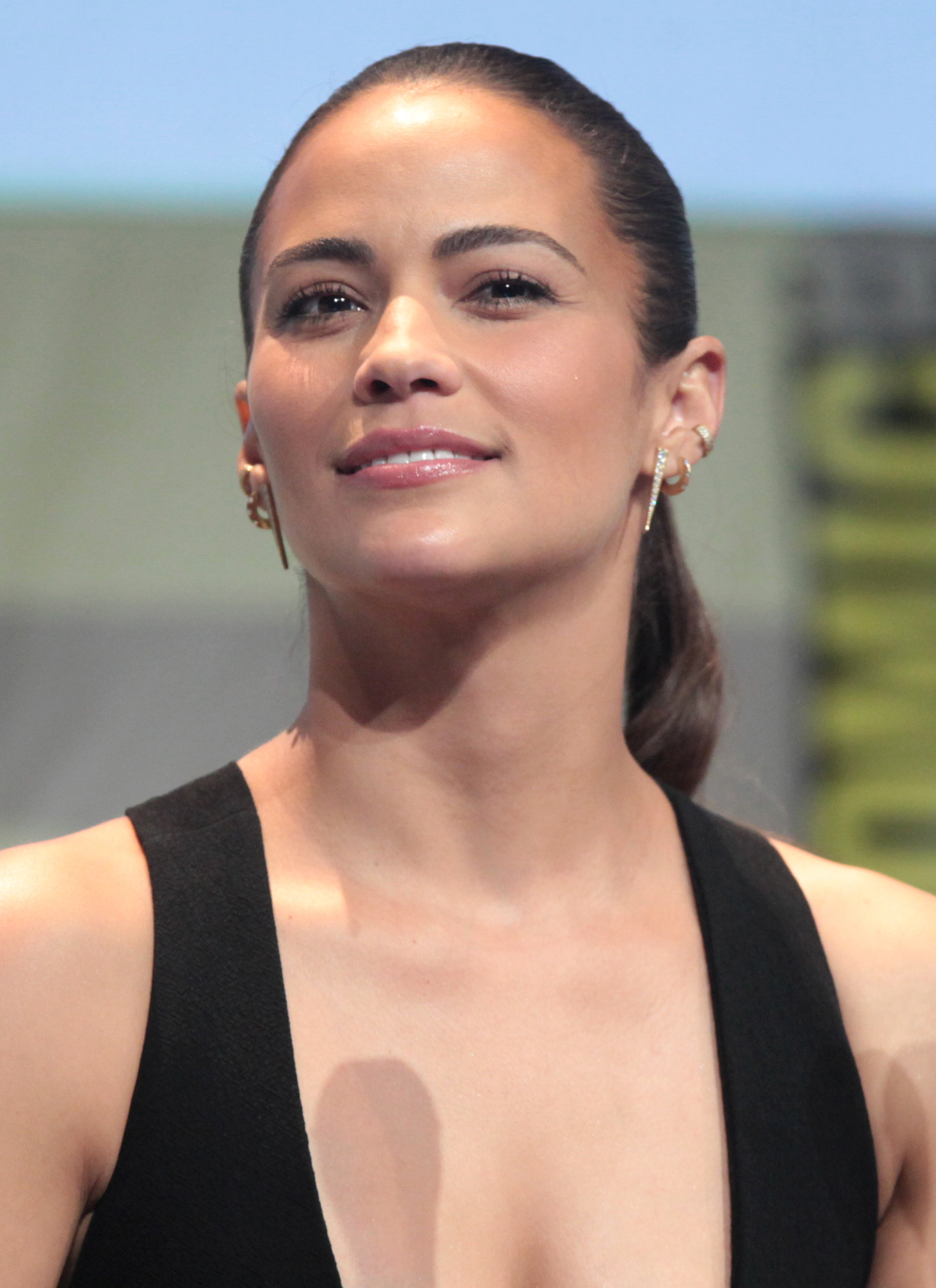
- Patton in 2015
- Born: Paula Maxine Patton; December 5, 1975 (age 50); Los Angeles, California, U.S.
- Other name: Max
- Education: University of Southern California (BFA)
- Occupations: Actress; producer
- Years active: 2005–present
- Spouse: Robin Thicke (m. 2005; div. 2015)
- Children: 1

Paula Maxine Patton (born December 5, 1975) is an American actress and producer. Patton has had starring and supporting roles in the films Déjà Vu (2006), Idlewild (2006), Precious (2009), Jumping the Broom (2011), Mission: Impossible – Ghost Protocol (2011), 2 Guns (2013), Warcraft (2016), and Sacrifice (2019).

== Early life and education ==
Patton was born on December 5, 1975, in Los Angeles, California, to Joyce (née Vanraden), a school teacher, and Charles Patton, a lawyer. Her mother is of German and Dutch descent, and her father is African-American. She graduated from Alexander Hamilton High School, and then started college at University of California, Berkeley, transferring to University of Southern California's Film School after her first year. Shortly after completing her studies, she won a three-month assignment making documentaries for PBS.

== Career ==
Patton provided additional vocals for Usher on his 2004 album Confessions. She provided the female vocal counterpart on the song "Can U Handle It?" which was co-written by Robin Thicke, whom she would later marry. Patton has song-writing credits on multiple Robin Thicke albums under the name "Max", derived from her middle name (Maxine).

Patton made her film debut with a small part in the 2005 romantic comedy film Hitch, alongside Will Smith. In the same year, she followed that with a small part in the drama film London. In 2006, she appeared alongside OutKast members Andre Benjamin and Big Boi in the musical film Idlewild written and directed by Bryan Barber.

Patton's big break came in 2006, when she landed the pivotal female lead role of Claire Kuchever in the science fiction thriller Déjà Vu alongside Denzel Washington. The film received mixed reviews from critics, but was a box office hit, grossing over US$180 million worldwide. She also appeared in her then-husband Robin Thicke's "Lost Without You" video in 2006. In an interview with Hot 97 Paula revealed on Ebro in the Morning that she ghostwrote with her ex-husband Robin Thicke under the name Max Haddington.

In 2008, Patton played television reporter Kate Madison in the comedy-drama Swing Vote alongside Kevin Costner. The same year, she played Amy Carson, the wife of Ben (Kiefer Sutherland), in the supernatural horror film Mirrors. In 2009, in Lee Daniels's critically acclaimed drama film Precious, she played Ms. Blu Rain, a teacher and mentor of disadvantaged students at an alternative high school in Harlem, New York, including the titular character, Claireece Precious Jones (Gabourey Sidibe). She later co-starred as Queen Latifah's character's god-sister in the romantic comedy Just Wright (2010).

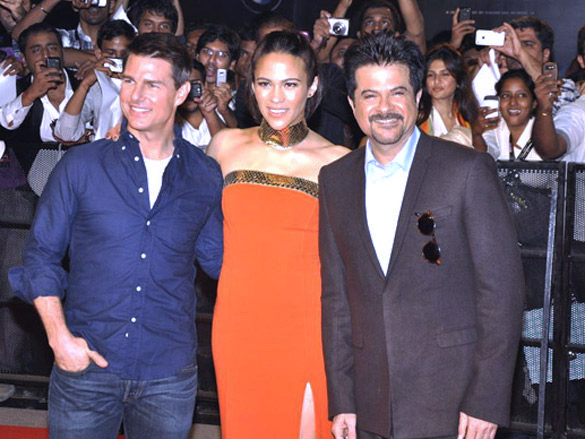
Patton with Tom Cruise and Anil Kapoor at the screening of Mission: Impossible – Ghost Protocol in 2011

In late 2010, it was announced that Patton would succeed Sharon Stone as the new full time assistant district attorney on the NBC crime drama series, Law & Order: Special Victims Unit. When Patton was cast in the lead female role in action film Mission: Impossible – Ghost Protocol, however, her role on Law & Order: Special Victims Unit was reduced to one episode. She was replaced by Melissa Sagemiller. Mission: Impossible was released on December 16, 2011, and was a critical and commercial success, grossing almost US$700 million worldwide. Also in 2011, Patton played the leading role in the comedy film Jumping the Broom.

In 2013, Patton co-starred alongside Denzel Washington and Mark Wahlberg in the action comedy film 2 Guns, and starred in the leading role in the romantic comedy film Baggage Claim. The latter film received negative reviews from numerous critics. On February 24, 2015, it was announced that Patton was cast as lead character in the ABC crime drama pilot Runner. It was not picked up to series.

In 2016, Patton starred in the romantic comedy film The Perfect Match, alongside Terrence Jenkins and Cassie Ventura, appeared alongside Adam Sandler and David Spade in direct-to-Netflix comedy film The Do-Over, and starred as Garona Halforcen in the Warcraft film adaptation, released in June.

In January 2017, Patton was cast in the lead role of the ABC drama series Somewhere Between, which premiered as a mid-season replacement on July 24, 2017, and was cancelled after one season. In 2019, she starred in the BET+ first original film, Sacrifice.

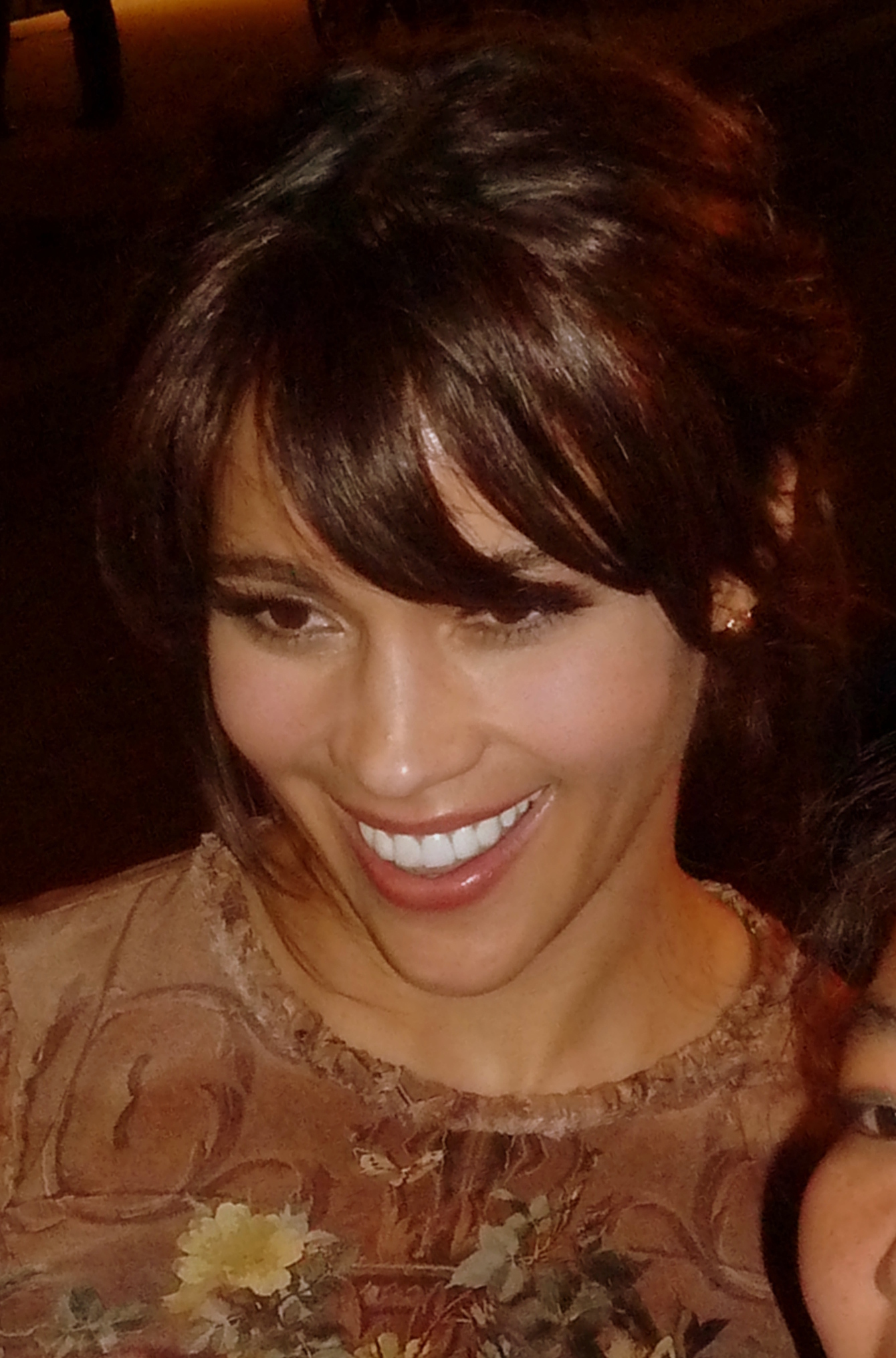
Patton at the InStyle Party at the 2012 Toronto International Film Festival.

In April 2025, she was announced to be planning to work with Joel McHale on the musical indie Reimagined.

== Personal life ==
In 1991, at age 15, Patton met recording artist Robin Thicke, who was then 14, at an under-21 hip-hop club called Balistyx (co-founded and co-hosted by David Faustino) on the Sunset Strip in Los Angeles, when Thicke asked her to dance. According to Thicke, he sang Stevie Wonder's "Jungle Fever" to her as they danced. The couple began dating in 1993 and married on June 11, 2005. Patton gave birth to their son on April 6, 2010. They announced their separation on February 24, 2014, after 21 years together and almost nine years of marriage. On October 8, 2014, Patton officially filed for divorce and joint custody of their son. The divorce was finalized on March 20, 2015.

In January 2017, a judge denied Patton's request to limit Thicke's custody after she accused him of child abuse. Later that month, Patton was granted sole custody and a restraining order that included their son and her mother against Thicke after she accused him of domestic violence, infidelity, and drug and alcohol addiction. Patton and Thicke reached a custody agreement in August 2017.

== Filmography ==
Film
Year	Title	Role	Notes
2005	Hitch	Mandy	
2005	London	Alex	
2006	Idlewild	Angel Davenport / Sally B. Shelly	
2006	Déjà Vu	Claire Kuchever	
2008	Mirrors	Amy Carson	
2008	Swing Vote	Kate Madison	
2009	Precious	Ms. Blu Rain	
2010	Just Wright	Morgan Alexander	
2011	Mission: Impossible – Ghost Protocol	Jane Carter	
2011	Jumping the Broom	Sabrina Watson	
2012	Disconnect	Cindy Hull	
2013	2 Guns	Deb	
2013	Mercy	Cynthia	Short film
2013	Baggage Claim	Montana Moore	
2014	About Last Night	Allison	
2016	Past Forward	Pursuing Photographer #2	Short film
2016	The Perfect Match	Sherry	Also producer
2016	The Do-Over	Heather Fishman	
2016	Warcraft	Garona Halforcen	
2018	Traffik	Brea	Also producer
2020	Four Kids and It	Alice	
2025	Finding Faith	Faith Mitchell	

Other credits
Year	Title	Role	Notes
1998	The Howie Mandel Show	Production Staff	Episode: "Episode dated 26 August 1998"
2000–2002	Medical Diaries	Segment producer / Producer	
2021–2023	Sacrifice	Executive producer / Co-executive producer	21 episodes

== Awards and nominations ==
Year	Award	Category	Nominated work	Result
2007	Black Reel Awards	Outstanding Breakthrough Performance	Déjà Vu	Nominated
2009	Boston Society of Film Critics	Best Ensemble Cast	Precious	Won
2010	Screen Actors Guild Awards	Outstanding Performance by a Cast in a Motion Picture	Precious	Nominated
2010	NAACP Image Awards	Outstanding Supporting Actress in a Motion Picture	Precious	Nominated
2010	Black Reel Awards	Outstanding Supporting Actress	Precious	Nominated
2012	Saturn Awards	Best Supporting Actress	Mission: Impossible – Ghost Protocol	Nominated
2012	Teen Choice Awards	Choice Movie Actress – Action	Mission: Impossible – Ghost Protocol	Nominated
2012	NAACP Image Awards	Outstanding Actress in a Motion Picture	Jumping the Broom	Nominated
