= Patrick Wyatt =

American video game programmer

- Employer: Amazon.com
- Title: Senior Principal Engineer at Amazon Games former: Vice President of Research and Development and Lead Programmer of Blizzard Entertainment, Co-Founder of ArenaNet, COO of En Masse Entertainment, and Company Advisor / Software Architect for Undead Labs

Patrick Wyatt is a game programmer and one of the three co-founders of ArenaNet. He was the leader of the Network and Technology teams and a programmer for Guild Wars. Before the founding of ArenaNet, he was working in Blizzard Entertainment where he was the Vice President of Research and Development and a senior programmer. Wyatt was the leader of Battle.net gaming network's programming and a major contributor on the multiplayer parts of Blizzard's popular games including StarCraft, Diablo and Warcraft II: Tides of Darkness. Having been in Blizzard for more than eight years, his work also includes earlier Blizzard games like Lost Vikings and Rock N' Roll Racing.

On February 24, 2010, he became the Chief Operations Officer for En Masse Entertainment, along with other industry veterans. The first official En Masse title, an MMORPG titled TERA, launched in 2011 in South Korea and 2012 in North America and Europe.

Patrick was employed by Undead Labs on January 30, 2014, where he worked with Jeff Strain, another co-founder of ArenaNet.

As of November 2015 he is now Senior Principal Engineer for Amazon Games.

== Games ==
Programmer of Game Ports

- The Lost Vikings (1992), Interplay Productions
- Battle Chess Enhanced CD-ROM (1992), Interplay Productions
- Rock 'n Roll Racing (1993), Interplay Productions
- The Death and Return of Superman (1994), Sun Corporation of America
- Blackthorne* (1994), Interplay Productions
- Justice League Task Force (1995), Acclaim Entertainment
- The Lost Vikings 2 (1997), Interplay Entertainment

Producer and Lead Programmer

- WarCraft: Orcs & Humans (1994), Blizzard Entertainment
- Warcraft II: Tides of Darkness (1995), Blizzard Entertainment
- StarCraft (1998), Blizzard Entertainment

Programmer

- Diablo (1996), Blizzard Entertainment
- Warcraft II: The Dark Saga (1997), Electronic Arts
- Warcraft II: Battle.net Edition (2000), Blizzard Entertainment
- Diablo II (2000), Blizzard Entertainment
- StarCraft: Brood War (1998), Blizzard Entertainment
- StarCraft 64 (2000), Nintendo of America
- Warcraft III: Reign of Chaos (2002), Blizzard Entertainment

Production/Business

- Guild Wars: Nightfall (2006), NCsoft Europe
- Guild Wars: Factions (2006), NCsoft Europe
- Guild Wars: Eye of the North (2007), NCsoft Europe
- Aion (2009), NCsoft West
- TERA (2011), NHN Games Corporation
