= Azeroth =

Fictional planet

- Azeroth as seen from space. The hurricane-like storm in the lower left is the Maelstrom, created when the Well of Eternity collapsed.
- First appearance: Warcraft: Orcs & Humans (1994)
- Created by: Blizzard Entertainment
- Genre: Fantasy

In-universe information
- Type: Terrestrial planet

Azeroth is a fictional planet that is the primary setting of the Warcraft franchise of fantasy video games, books and other media. While introduced as an overarching setting in 1994 with Warcraft: Orcs & Humans, its physical presence was more heavily developed in the 2004 MMORPG spin-off, World of Warcraft, which introduced players to microcosms of numerous locations on the planet.

== Creation and development ==
Azeroth is a terrestrial planet populated by numerous intelligent races, both humanoid and non-humanoid, of varying origins. In Warcraft's fictional mythos, Azeroth was initially created by godlike cosmic beings known as Titans, who also formed some of Azeroth's races in the ensuing eons, such as humans and dwarves, while other races, like the tauren and trolls, arose naturally. 10,000 years before the events of World of Warcraft, a catastrophic event known as the Sundering collapsed a reservoir of magic known as the Well of Eternity, shattering Azeroth's sole continent, Kalimdor, into numerous smaller continents. In the era World of Warcraft is set, there are two main competing factions on Azeroth, the Alliance and Horde.

Events in World of Warcraft: The War Within reveal that Azeroth also contains a female World Soul, or nascent Titan, at its core. Unable to defend herself, she relies on the inhabitants of Azeroth for protection, as many outside threats, including the malevolent Titan Sargeras, tried and failed to corrupt or kill her.

The name “Azeroth,” however, has been used to designate different territorial entities throughout the development of the Warcraft series. In Orcs & Humans, “Azeroth” was the name of the human kingdom attacked by the Horde; this nation was renamed the Kingdom of Stormwind in Of Blood and Honor (2001), although it retained its original name in subsequent material. However, the two names were used interchangeably until after the launch of World of Warcraft. In more recent material, the kingdom is referred to only as the “Kingdom of Stormwind,” while the name “Azeroth” has been used to designate the entire planet.

The world of Azeroth was praised for its expansive backstory and memorable locations and races, although its depiction in World of Warcraft drew criticism for its small size and theme park-like simplified design that is optimized for player fun at the expense of immersion in storytelling. The fact that players are forced into heroic roles and pitted against each other in opposing factions has been called indicative of a lack of player freedom, especially as the factions have ceased to have obvious distinctions in their roles.

== Setting ==
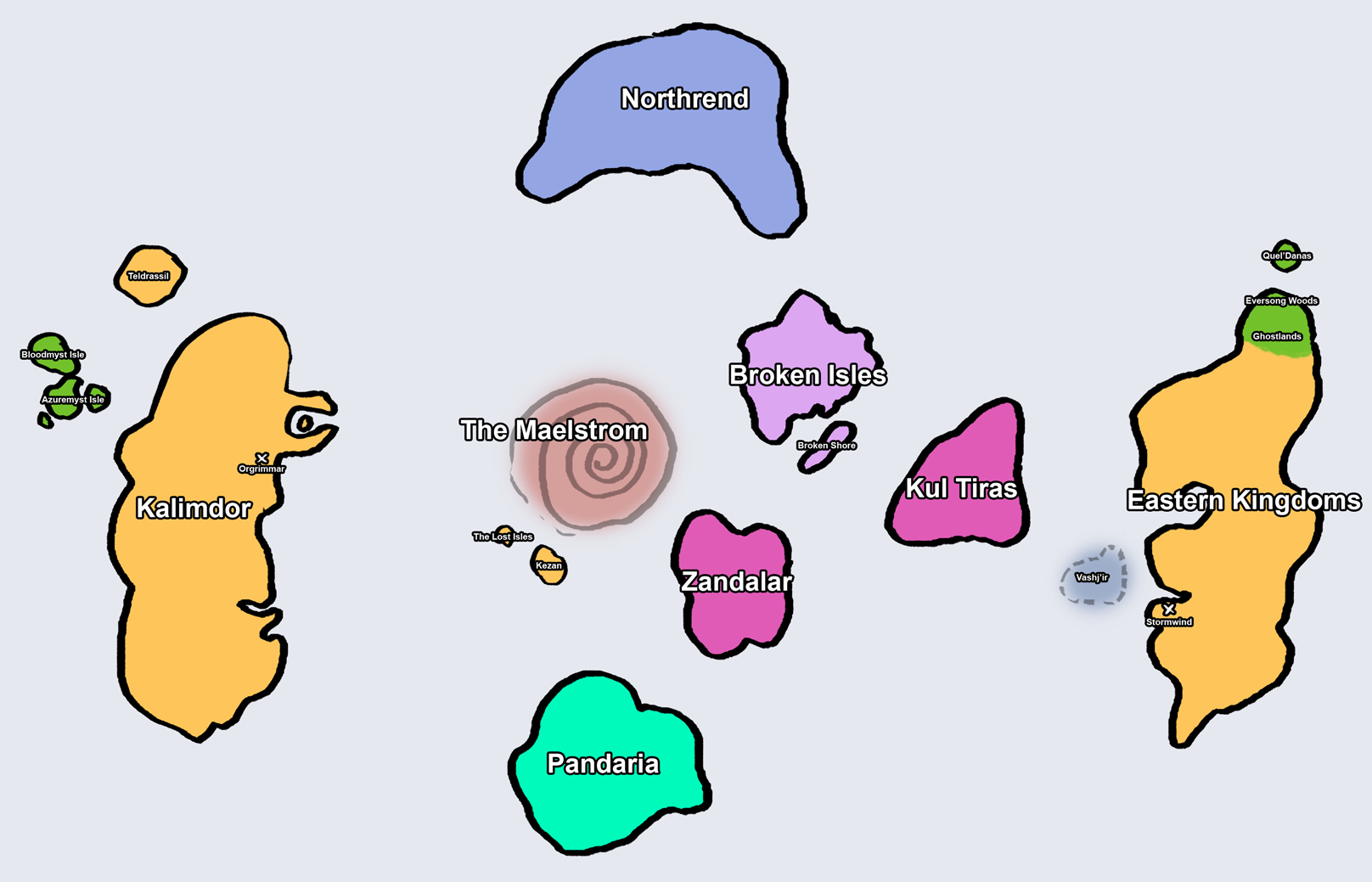
A simple map depicting the continents of the game world Azeroth

The world of Azeroth is divided into three main continents; Northrend, Kalimdor and the Eastern Kingdoms. In the center is the Maelstrom, a magic whirlpool created during the Sundering.

=== Eastern Kingdoms ===
The Eastern Kingdoms are the primary setting of the first two games (and their expansions) and the first half of Warcraft III: Reign of Chaos. It is made up of 22 areas or zones.

=== Stormwind ===
The kingdom of Stormwind lies at the south of the Eastern Kingdoms, south of the dwarven kingdom of Khaz Modan and north of the jungle known as Stranglethorn Vale. The capital city of Stormwind, Stormwind City, is nestled into the northwest of Elwynn Forest, a large forest at the center of the kingdom.

=== Khaz Modan ===
The Dwarven capital in Khaz Modan, called Ironforge, is located in Dun Morogh.

=== Lordaeron ===
The former human kingdom of Lordaeron, which successfully headed the human Alliance in Warcraft II: Tides of Darkness but later fell to the Scourge in Warcraft III: Reign of Chaos, is located north of the southern kingdoms. Underneath the ruined city of Lordaeron now lies the Undercity, capital of the Forsaken, a rebel band of the undead Scourge. The area is now known as Tirisfal Glades and is threatened by the Western Plaguelands held back at The Bulwark. Northeast of Lordaeron is the elven nation of Quel'Thalas and its capital city, Silvermoon, both of which were conquered by the Scourge in Warcraft III: Reign of Chaos.

=== Kalimdor ===
The continent of Kalimdor was introduced in Warcraft III: Reign of Chaos and is made up of 18 zones. Whereas the Eastern Kingdoms can be described as the equivalent of medieval Europe, with traditional kingdoms and advanced cities, Kalimdor can be compared to the Americas at the time of the first arrivals of Europeans, full of wild lands. The geography and topography of Kalimdor are similar to North America and Africa, with massive, ancient forests and mountains covering the North and vast deserts and savannahs in the South. The Night Elven kingdom is located in the northwest region of Kalimdor, also including the island Teldrassil (actually a giant tree, similar in lore and spelling to Yggdrasil) off the northwest coast, which contains the city of Darnassus.

=== Barrens ===
To the south, past the Ashenvale Forest, is a stretch of land known as The Barrens, situated between the grasslands of Mulgore to the west, and Durotar, the land settled by the Orcs, to the east. Mulgore is home to the Tauren capital of Thunder Bluff, a large city of tepees and lodges built on top of a conglomerate of high plateaus which are only accessible by air travel and a great series of lifts built down to the ground. In the north of Durotar is the fortress-city of Orgrimmar, the capital of the Orcs.

=== Northend ===
Northrend

The third continent, Northrend, is located in the northern polar region of Azeroth and is the primary stronghold of the malevolent Undead Scourge. Northrend is featured in Warcraft III: Reign of Chaos and its expansion set Warcraft III: The Frozen Throne, and is the main location featured in World of Warcraft: Wrath of the Lich King, the second expansion pack to World of Warcraft.

=== Expansions ===
In the expansion World of Warcraft: Cataclysm, Azeroth has been changed permanently in-game, even for players without the expansion set installed. The corrupted Black Dragon Aspect, Deathwing the Destroyer (formerly Neltharion, the Earth-Warder) has broken free from imprisonment in Deepholm, part of the Elemental Plane, and caused major changes and destruction in the land. In addition, many new parts of the continents of Azeroth that have previously been inaccessible have become key parts in the new world.

==== Sunderling ====
Lorewise, this is the second major change to the face of Azeroth, the first being the Sundering. The Sundering was caused as a result of the War of the Ancients where demons of the Burning Legion invaded the ancient Kalimdor. It caused a massive explosion that split the one continent into the four seen in-game and created the Maelstrom.

==== Pandaria ====
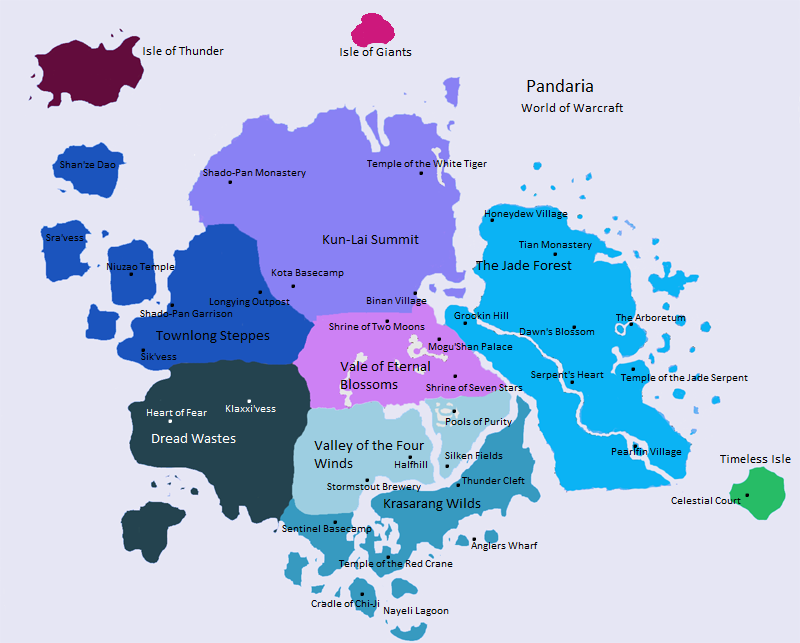
Pandaria

World of Warcraft: Mists of Pandaria was the fourth expansion released and it focuses on the mythical and long-forgotten lands of Pandaria, a continent far to the south that has until now been shrouded in magical mists. It has been inhabited by the Pandarens (a race of humanoid giant pandas). With both factions landing on Pandaria, adventurers rediscover the ancient Pandaren people, whose wisdom will help guide them to new destinies; the Pandaren Empire's ancient enemy, the Mantid; and their legendary oppressors, the enigmatic Mogu. The storyline for Mists of Pandaria is split into multiple chapters. The story arc that introduces Pandaria—where players discover the continent and level up, helping to solve problems and figure out what happened for the past 10,000 years and why—was included entirely within the initial expansion release. Later chapters in the storyline brought the war between the Horde and the Alliance back into focus, including changing parts of Pandaria (via phasing) to show additional settlements, and eventually returning the players back to Kalimdor for a final showdown, dethroning Warchief Garrosh Hellscream.

==== Broken Isles ====
World of Warcraft: Legion was the sixth expansion released and it focuses on the Broken Isles, a continent and group of islands located northeast of the Maelstrom in the middle of the Great Sea; one of the islands contains the Tomb of the Dark Titan, Sargeras. The Burning Legion has started an invasion of Azeroth and the player characters must find powerful artifacts to stop the invasion. Having thwarted the Burning Legion's attempts to invade Azeroth, the players and other significant lore characters traveled to Argus, the homeworld of the Burning Legion, in order to end its threat. While successful, they couldn't stop Sargeras entirely. Before being banished and imprisoned, he thrust a magical sword into the surface of Azeroth, leaving the planet wounded and bleeding a magical substance called "Azerite".

==== Kul Tiras and Zandalar ====
World of Warcraft: Battle for Azeroth was the seventh expansion released and it focuses on the islands of Kul Tiras and Zandalar, two islands which are home to their respective kingdoms. This is the first expansion that introduces two new continents on initial release. During this expansion, the Horde and Alliance seek the aid of the kingdoms of Zandalar and Kul Tiras, respectively, for the reignited war between the factions. Throughout campaigns on both continents, adventurers learn the history of both kingdoms and uncover plots involving the Old Gods. Events influenced by N'Zoth and his followers lead to the discovery of the continents of Nazjatar, the underwater kingdom of Azshara, and Mechagon, an island inhabited by the Mechagnomes. The final patch of Battle for Azeroth takes players back to the Vale of Eternal Blossoms and Uldum to cure them of the corruption of N'Zoth, and ultimately face the Old God himself in his empire of Ny'alotha. The story of Battle for Azeroth is also the first time players are given choices that can have a significant impact on their own adventures. One significant choice is whether to join the orc Varrok Saurfang in his rebellion against the Horde Warchief Sylvanas Windrunner. Another choice that players are given is whether to become a servant of N'Zoth. Both choices lead to unique dialogue, cinematics, and quests, depending on the choices made.

==== Dragon Isles ====
The ninth expansion, World of Warcraft: Dragonflight, centers around the reappearance of the Dragon Isles, home of the Dragons and their many aspects, including the humanoid Dracthyr. The various Dragon groups and subspecies are referred to as "Dragonflights", and are all descendants of the original proto-dragons who chose to become empowered by the magic of a race of god-like beings called the Titans. The plot of Dragonflight deals with the awakening of the Dracthyr after 20,000 years in response to the threat of Raszageth the Storm-Eater, a "Primalist" proto-dragon who seeks to separate the rest of her kind from the Dragonflights and retake Azeroth for themselves. The Dracthyr are divided into two groups, one that allies with the Alliance and one the Horde, to deal with this threat. Raszageth eventually falls to both groups, but not before she releases her three siblings: Fyrakk the Blazing, Vyranoth the Frozenheart, and Iridikron the Stoneheart.

==== Khaz Algar ====
The tenth expansion, World of Warcraft: The War Within, takes players beneath the surface of Azeroth into the subterranean kingdom of Khaz Algar, home of the Earthen, a new playable allied race. The expansion introduces Warbands, an account-wide system for sharing currencies, collections, and reputations across characters, as well as Delves, a new form of solo instanced content.

==== Quel'Thalas ====
The eleventh expansion, World of Warcraft: Midnight, returns to the elven kingdom of Quel'Thalas, introducing four new zones including Eversong and Zul'Aman. The expansion features three raids, eight new dungeons, and a player housing system — the first in the game's twenty-year history.

== Reception ==
In Digital Culture, Play, and Identity, Espen Aarseth describes Azeroth in World of Warcraft as "small, static, and quite phony" compared to the real world and even other massively-multiplayer games like Ultima Online, saying that the population of any one server "realm" is only in the thousands, and describing its "sharply distinguished zones" as more resembling a "quilt" than a realistic world. Other aspects were noted as undermining Azeroth's realism for the sake of gameplay, such as ingame chat, electronic auction houses, "mechanically accurate" beast mounts, and respawning enemies and NPCs. However, he also noted that these cartoonish aspects were part of the game's broad intercultural appeal. Characterizing Azeroth's design as "all about playability", he compares the ideal design for such places to real-world theme parks such as Disney World and Universal Studios, describing it as merely a virtual theme park version of the more in-depth and ever-changing mythos described in Warcraft I-III and the franchise's novels. Other aspects, such as the inclusion of meeting places for players, more resemble "planned urban spaces" than a living, breathing natural world.

In Battlefields of Negotiation, Rene Glas describes Azeroth in a similar fashion, saying its depiction in World of Warcraft was far removed from Azeroth as depicted in lore. As a model of the "real" Azeroth, it can be simplified and stylized with play in mind. One element of this simplification is forcing players to choose a player who is a heroic warrior and lacks physical defects, with non-heroic characters being limited to NPCs. While the quest system is rigid, with quests having only one story outcome, the order of quests performed can still create individualized stories for characters. They describe the faction division between Alliance and Horde as one of the most impactful simplifications of the lore, noting that while the game is clearly designed for inter-faction struggle between "good" and "evil" sides, the two sides have become increasingly equal in their actions over time to the point that neither has moral superiority, with the Alliance being seen as warmongering colonizers, while the Horde lives in harmony with nature. Responding to Aarseth's statement about the world resembling a theme park, he argues that the "real" Azeroth is as large as the world of Tolkien, but the Azeroth portrayed ingame is only a simplification by design. Glas criticizes the lack of player impact on the world as creating "situations that affect fictional coherency".
