= Warcraft II: Tides of Darkness =

1995 video game

- Developer: Blizzard Entertainment
- Publishers: NA: Davidson & Associates; EU: Zablac Entertainment
- Producers: Samwise Didier; Michael Morhaime; Patrick Wyatt
- Designer: Ron Millar
- Programmers: Bob Fitch; Jesse McReynolds; Michael Morhaime
- Writer: Chris Metzen
- Composer: Glenn Stafford
- Series: Warcraft
- Platforms: MS-DOS, Classic Mac OS, Saturn, PlayStation, Windows
- Release: MS-DOS, Mac OS: NA: December 5, 1995; AU: December 1995; EU: January 1996; Saturn, PlayStation: EU: July 1997; NA: August 20, 1997
- Genre: Real-time strategy
- Modes: Single-player, multiplayer

Warcraft II: Tides of Darkness is a fantasy real-time strategy (RTS) computer game developed by Blizzard Entertainment and released for MS-DOS and Microsoft Windows in 1995 and Mac OS in 1996 by Blizzard's parent, Davidson & Associates. A sequel to Warcraft: Orcs & Humans, the game was met with positive reviews and won most of the major PC gaming awards in 1996. In 1996, Blizzard released an expansion pack, Warcraft II: Beyond the Dark Portal, for DOS and Mac OS, and a compilation, Warcraft II: The Dark Saga, for the PlayStation and Sega Saturn. The Battle.net edition, released in 1999, included Warcraft II: Beyond the Dark Portal, provided Blizzard's online gaming service, and replaced the MS-DOS version with a Windows one.

In Warcraft II, as in many RTS games, players collect resources to produce buildings and units to defeat an opponent in combat. Players gain access to more advanced units upon construction of tech buildings and research. The majority of the display screen shows the part of the territory on which the player is currently operating, and, using the small mini-map, the player can select another location to view and operate on. The fog of war completely hides all territory (appears black) which the player has not explored: terrain that has been explored is always visible in gray tones, but enemy units remain visible only so long as they stay within a friendly unit's visual radius. Buildings remain displayed as the player last saw them, and do not register unobserved changes such as being built, damaged, or repaired, etc.

Warcraft II was a commercial hit, with global sales above 3 million units by 2001; roughly two-thirds were sold in the United States. The game strongly influenced the company's next successful RTS, the futuristic StarCraft (1998) in gameplay, and in attention to personality and storyline. In 1996, Blizzard announced Warcraft Adventures: Lord of the Clans, an adventure game in the Warcraft universe, but canceled the project in 1998. Warcraft III: Reign of Chaos, released in 2002, used parts of Warcraft Adventures' characters and storyline, but extended the gameplay used in Warcraft II.

== Gameplay ==
Warcraft II is a real-time strategy game. In Warcraft II one side represents the human inhabitants of Lordaeron and allied races, and the other controls the invading orcs and their allied races. Each side tries to destroy the other by collecting resources and creating an army. The game is played in a medieval setting with fantasy elements, where both sides have melee, ranged, naval and aerial units, and spellcasters.

=== Modes ===
Warcraft II allows players to play AI opponents in separate Human and Orc campaigns, and in stand-alone scenarios. Most of the campaign missions follow the pattern "collect resources, build buildings and units, destroy opponents". However, some have other objectives, such as rescuing troops or forts, or escorting important characters through enemy territory.

The game's map editor allows players to develop scenarios for use in multiplayer contests and against AI opponents. The editor runs under the Mac and also under either Windows 95 or, if the WinG library was installed, under Windows 3.0.

The scenarios can be played against the AI or in multiplayer games with up to eight players participating. The DOS version initially provided multiplayer games by null modem cable, modem or IPX, and Mac players could also play via TCP/IP or AppleTalk. Blizzard quickly released a facility to connect with Kali, which allows programs to access the Web by means of IPX.

=== Economy and war ===
Warcraft II requires players to collect resources and to produce buildings and units to defeat an opponent in combat. The Human Town Hall and Orc Great Hall produce basic workers that dig gold from mines and chop wood from forests and then deliver them to their halls. Both buildings can be upgraded twice, each increasing usable resources per load from the workers. Players can also construct shipyards, which can produce both combat ships and oil tankers. These tankers build construction offshore oil platforms and then deliver the oil to buildings on the shoreline. As all three resources are non-renewable, players must use them efficiently. This can lead to creative thinking regarding forests as both a source of lumber and a means of forcing the enemy to go around it.

Workers can also construct farms, each of which provides food for up to four units, and additional units cannot be produced until enough farms are built. Farms, being very tough for their cost, are also employed as defensive walls.

Humans and Orcs have sets of buildings with similar functions, but different names and graphics, for producing ground, naval, and air units. All but basic combat units require the assistance of other buildings or must be produced at buildings that have prerequisite buildings, or both. Many buildings can upgrade combat units. When advanced units appear, the Orcs have a strong advantage in ground combat, while the Humans have the more powerful fleet and spellcasters. The most advanced ground combatants on each side can be upgraded and taught some spells, which are different for the two sides. Some campaign missions feature hero units, which are more powerful than normal units of the same type, have unique pictures and names, and must not die, as that causes the failure of the mission.

=== User interface ===
In the largest area of the screen, to the right, the Orcs (the player's, in blue) attack a Human town and its defenders (red). The flaming buildings are close to collapse, and the burnt ground to their right is the remains of a razed building. This is a winter map, and the ice enables ground units to walk over the shallow part of the sea.

The main screen has five areas:

- Along the top are the menu button and counts of the player's resources: gold from gold mines, wood from trees, oil from oil patches and food from farms
- The largest area of the screen, to the right, shows the part of the territory on which the player is currently operating. This enables the player to select friendly units and buildings.
- The top left is the mini-map, which shows the whole territory at smaller scale and highlights the part on which the player is currently operating. By clicking or dragging in the mini-map, the player can select another location to appear in the larger display.
- The unit descriptions in the area in middle on the left shows the units and/or buildings. If units of the same type are selected, this area have an icon for each unit, showing the unit's vital statistics including the unit's health.
- If a single unit or building is selected, the area at the bottom left shows the actions the object can perform and all completed upgrades that apply to this type of unit or building.

Initially most of the main map and mini-map are blacked out, but the visible area expands as the player's units explore the map. The fog of war completely hides all territory which the player has not explored and shows only terrain but hides opponents units and buildings if none of the player's units are present there.

All functions can be invoked by both the mouse and shortcut keys, including game setup, the menu options and some gameplay functions, including scrolling and pausing the game. Units and buildings can be selected by clicking or bandboxing (i.e. using the mouse to draw a box around the units to be selected), and then their actions can be controlled by the mouse or keys.

== Storyline ==
=== The Second War ===
The First War brought the Fall of Azeroth, following the Orc campaign in Warcraft: Orcs & Humans. The survivors of Azeroth have fled by sea to the Human kingdom of Lordaeron, and the Orcs have decided to conquer Lordaeron, in what is known as the Second War. Both sides have acquired allies and new capabilities, including naval and air units, and more powerful spellcasters.

In the Second War, the Orcs are successful at first, but the Humans and their allies take the initiative, partly thanks to an Orc rebellion initiated by the warlock Gul'dan, who seeks to raise the sunken Tomb of Sargeras. Eventually, the Alliance forces push the Horde to Blackrock Spire, but Anduin Lothar, commander of the Alliance, is slain there. At the final battle around the Dark Portal in Azeroth, the Alliance exterminates one Orc clan and captures the Orc supreme commander and the remnants of his forces. Hoping to avoid further invasions, the Alliance destroys the Dark Portal.

The game's narrative is continued in the expansion pack Warcraft II: Beyond the Dark Portal.

== Development ==
After seeing the excellent response to Warcraft: Orcs & Humans, released in November 1994, Blizzard Entertainment started working on Warcraft II: Tides of Darkness. Development began in February 1995, and the game was released in North America and Australia on December 5, 1995, and by Zablac Entertainment in Europe in January 1996 for MS-DOS, with a port for Mac OS releasing in August 1996. Blizzard later explained that the small budgets of the time allowed short development times. The response to Warcraft: Orcs & Humans also allowed Blizzard to recruit additional top-class developers. The company's initial design combined modern and fantasy elements, such as fighter pilots ambushed by a fire-breathing dragon. However, they found that this was unsatisfactory, and that there was plenty of content for a fantasy RTS. The initial release of Warcraft II: Tides of Darkness ran over a local area network using IPX but not over the Internet communications protocol TCP/IP. Kali, which used the Internet as if it was a local area network, became very popular and Blizzard quickly provided to players a program that made it easy to set up multiplayer Warcraft II games using Kali.

In 1996 Blizzard published Warcraft II: Beyond the Dark Portal, an expansion pack initially contracted out to Cyberlore Studios. This contract was cancelled, as Blizzard, unhappy after a milestone check-in, moved development in-house. The expansion introduced new Human and Orc campaigns, featuring new and much more powerful heroes. Later that year the company released Warcraft II: Battle Chest, a compilation of Tides of Darkness and Beyond the Dark Portal, for DOS and Windows 3.

Several non-canon expansion packs were released; these expansion packs are not a part of the human and orc campaign story. In 1996 WizardWorks published W!Zone, an expansion pack developed by Sunstorm Interactive, Inc. and authorized by Blizzard Entertainment. It was followed by W!Zone II: Retribution, an expansion pack published by WizardWorks and authorized by Blizzard Entertainment. In 1997 Maverick Software published The Next 70 Levels, an expansion pack developed by Maverick Software and authorized by Blizzard Entertainment. It was followed by The Next 350 Levels, an expansion pack published by Maverick Software and authorized by Blizzard Entertainment

Blizzard sold exclusive worldwide rights to develop, publish, and distribute console versions of the game to Electronic Arts. In 1997 Electronic Arts published Warcraft II: The Dark Saga for the Sony PlayStation and Sega Saturn, which combined the campaigns of Warcraft II: Tides of Darkness and Warcraft II: Beyond the Dark Portal. This port was developed by Climax. The Dark Saga also allowed players to automate upgrade of buildings and production of units and to select more troops at once, facilities that were not extended to the DOS and Mac versions. Early betas of The Dark Saga included a working two-player mode, which used the consoles' respective link cable peripherals, but Electronic Arts eliminated this feature before the final release.

In 1999 Blizzard published the Warcraft II: Battle.net Edition for Windows and Mac, which combined the original game and the expansion pack, retained the Macintosh facilities and replaced the DOS version with a Windows version that included Blizzard's online service, Battle.net, for multiplayer games. After considering new content, Blizzard preferred to make it easy for new and older fans to play each other. Battle.net Edition included some user interface enhancements from StarCraft – a hot key to center on events, assigning numbers to groups of units, and double-clicking to select all units of a type. However, they excluded production queues and waypoints.

The game, including Beyond the Dark Portal, was remastered along with Warcraft: Orc and Humans in November 2024.

== Reception ==
=== Sales ===
Warcraft II debuted at No. 2 on PC Data's monthly computer game sales chart for December 1995, behind Myst. It held the spot in January 1996, but dropped to No. 3 in its third month. The game stayed in PC Data's top 3 from April through October, securing first place in April, August and September. After falling to No. 5 in November, it exited the top 10 the following month. Warcraft II achieved worldwide sales of 500,000 units within three months of release, and of over 1.2 million by November. This made it the world's most commercially successful computer game of the year as of November, according to PC Data. In the United States, it was the second-best-selling computer game of 1996, again behind Myst. The game sold 835,680 copies and earned $34.5 million in the region for the year. To capitalize on this success, Blizzard released the Warcraft Battlechest on November 11, which bundled Warcraft: Orcs & Humans with Warcraft II and the Beyond the Dark Portal add-on.

Warcraft II claimed position 13 in PC Data's monthly sales rankings for January 1997, while the Warcraft Battlechest SKU took sixth place. The original game exited the top 20 after a 16th-place finish in February. However, the Battlechest consistently continued to chart through May, peaking at ninth in February. After an absence in June, it returned to the top 10 for two months, before falling to No. 16 in September and exiting PC Data's top 20 in October. The Warcraft Battlechest was the United States' 17th-highest computer game seller of the year, with sales of 262,911 units.

By April 1998, Warcraft II's basic SKU had sold 1.02 million units and earned $39.8 million in revenue in the United States. This led PC Data to declare it the country's sixth-best-selling computer game for the period between January 1993 and April 1998. Warcraft II as a whole reached 2 million global sales by July 1998, and passed 2.5 million by year's end. By September 1999, it had sold 1,250,675 units in the United States alone, which led PC Data to declare it the country's sixth-best-selling computer game since January 1993. Sales continued the following month, when the Warcraft II Battle.net Edition SKU finished 20th for October in the country. As of 2001, worldwide sales of Warcraft II had surpassed 3 million units, with two-thirds derived from the United States.

=== Critical reviews ===
Warcraft II: Tides of Darkness (1995–96)

Aggregate score
Aggregator	Score
GameRankings	95%

Review scores
Publication	Score
Computer Gaming World	4.5/5
GameRevolution	91%
GameSpot	93%
Next Generation	5/5 (PC)
The Adrenaline Vault	91
Computer Games Magazine	4.5/5
Entertainment Weekly	A
Arcane	8/10
Macworld	4/5
MacUser	4.5/5

Warcraft II: Tides of Darkness earned enthusiastic reviews, elevating Blizzard to the elite along with Westwood Studios, id Software and LucasArts. The rivalry between Blizzard's series and Westwood Studios' Command & Conquer series fueled the RTS boom of the late 1990s.

In 1996 GameSpot, Next Generation, and Computer Games Magazine regarded the AI as better than in Warcraft: Orcs & Humans, and Computer Games Magazine also said that Warcraft II "surpasses the original game in almost every way". GameSpot approved how the innovative fog of war forced players to scout continuously, and IGN's retroview agreed. Next Generation said that the new units and resources open up a multitude of strategic possibilities, but that the game's greatest improvement over the original Warcraft is its intuitive new control system, which allows players to select multiple units at once and access command menus by right-clicking. The Adrenaline Vault noted that players must manage their resources, as all resources run out. GameSpot's retrospective review was enthusiastic about the variety of strategies that players with different styles can use, and The Adrenaline Vault noted that maps set in winter often allow ground units to walk on the ice. Macworld's Michael Gowen wrote: "This game set the standard for the genre and still represents one of the best titles available. If you haven't played it, you have missed something."

Andy Butcher reviewed Warcraft 2: Tides of Darkness for Arcane magazine, commenting that "Warcraft 2 is a great game. Despite its limitations, it's challenging, fun, easy to get into, and very addictive. The ability to play either side means that there are a vast number of missions on offer, and a level designer gives yet more longevity."

PC Gamer US named Warcraft II the best game of 1995. The editors called it an "easy" choice, and wrote that "Warcraft II stand[s] out — way out — as the most impressive, most entertaining, game of 1995". The magazine also presented Warcraft II with the award for 1995's "Best Multi-Player Game". The editors of Macworld gave the game their 1996 "Best Strategy Game" award. It also won Computer Game Review's 1995 "Military Sim of the Year" award, tied with Steel Panthers. The same year, Next Generation listed it as number 10 on their "Top 100 Games of All Time", explaining that "The strategy is complex, the classy SVGA graphics keep the player in touch with everything that's going on, and WarCraft II features the best use of sampled speech we've ever experienced." Warcraft II was a runner-up for Computer Gaming World's 1995 "Strategy Game of the Year" award, which ultimately went to Command & Conquer and Heroes of Might and Magic (tie). The editors wrote that Warcraft II "will keep you glued to the computer for hours on end" and noted that it "could have won had the competition not been so strong". MacUser declared Warcraft II one of 1996's top 50 CD-ROMs. In 1996, Computer Gaming World declared Warcraft II the 28th-best computer game ever released. In 1996, GamesMaster ranked the game 38th on their "Top 100 Games of All Time".

The IGN review considered WarCraft II in general a well-balanced game, but GameSpot's retrospective review regarded Ogre-Mages with the Bloodlust spell as too powerful. IGN found that searching for the survivors of a defeated opponent could be tedious, and that the first few missions were very easy, although the final ones were challenging.

In 1996 GameSpot, Computer Games Magazine and Entertainment Weekly praised the SVGA graphics. The retrospective reviews by IGN and GameSpot enjoyed smaller details, such as the increasingly humorous responses when a player's units were repeatedly clicked, the "critters" that wandered around, and the detonating of sappers/bombers. WarCraft II won most of the major PC gaming awards in 1996 and sold millions of copies. Players were still playing in 2002, on DOS or using the Battle.net edition.

Pyramid magazine reviewed Warcraft II: Tides of Darkness and stated that "In this real-time fantasy wargame, Orcs and humans vie for control over the land of Azeroth. This time the battle wages not only on the ground, but in the sea and air as well. The first Warcraft game was a great game in its own right, and the sequel is even better."

In 1998, PC Gamer declared it the 9th-best computer game ever released, and the editors called it "a sequel that isn't just more of the same; it's bigger and better in every way".

Retrospective reviews by IGN and GameSpot emphasized the ability to join multiplayer games on local networks or using Kali, and the simple but effective map editor, with which some users published maps on the Web. Another GameSpot review in 1996 commented that the campaigns are rather short, but the scenario builder and multiplayer options were ample compensation.

In 2006, Warcraft II was inducted into GameSpot's list of the greatest games of all time.

=== The Dark Saga ===
Warcraft II: The Dark Saga

Review scores
Publication	Score
Electronic Gaming Monthly	8.5/10 (SAT)
GameSpot	7/10 (PS1, SAT)
Sega Saturn Magazine	91% (SAT)

GameSpot described the ports of the consoles Sony PlayStation and Sega Saturn, combining Warcraft II: Tides of Darkness and Warcraft II: Beyond the Dark Portal, as practically identical to the PC version. Electronic Gaming Monthly and GamePro, however, asserted that the graphics are significantly downgraded, and the interface, though somewhat simplified with the additions of auto-upgrading, auto-building, and the ability to select more than nine units at once, is still more cumbersome and difficult to learn than the PC version's. Absolute PlayStation, in contrast, regarded the graphics as impressive and the console buttons as easy to use.

Absolute PlayStation, Sega Saturn Magazine, Electronic Gaming Monthly, and GamePro commented that the console versions have no multiplayer capability, but were impressed with the number of campaign and skirmish maps. Most reviews of the Saturn version criticized the lack of support for the Sega NetLink peripheral, which could have enabled online multiplayer. The two GameSpot reviews noted that, while most campaign missions follow the "resource, build, destroy" pattern, some have other objectives.

Most reviews for the PlayStation and Saturn versions suggested that players with PCs should not buy the console versions, but recommended the game to those who use only consoles. Electronic Gaming Monthly gave the Saturn version their "Game of the Month" award and later named both console versions a runner-up for "Strategy Game of the Year". Absolute PlayStation omitted comparisons with the PC and praised the console versions. Sega Saturn Magazine called it "a highly enjoyable and compelling strategy warfare game" and praised the Saturn version as superior to the PC original.

=== Battle.net Edition ===
GameSpot thought the AI was predictable but very efficient and the multiplayer facilities, while four years old, made it more enjoyable than at least half the new RTS games released in 1999. The Battle.net service was already reliable after being refined through experience on Diablo and StarCraft, and the fact that it was free would be attractive both to new users and those of earlier editions. While the production values were those of 1995, the cartoonish graphics and excellent sound effects and musical score were still enjoyable in 1999.
