= Afrogameuses =

Feminist gaming non-profit organization

- Formation: 14 July 2020
- Founders: Jennifer Lufau
- Founded at: Paris
- Legal status: Non-profit
- Location: Paris
- Website: www.afrogameuses.com

Afrogameuses is an international community, created in 2020, composed mainly of female gamers and streamers, both amateur and professional. This collective campaigns for a better representation and visibility of minorities in the world of video games and streaming in France, while focusing on Afro-descendant women, in order to promote diversity and inclusiveness in these environments.

The aim is to encourage a video game ecosystem that is more representative of ethnic minorities, on different levels: characters, streaming platforms, training, the e-sports and professional world, through the promotion of role models, awareness-raising, information, and education, in order to encourage equal opportunities and a better experience for invisibilised populations in the video game sector.

== Context ==
Video games experiment similar conflicts to those apparent in modern societies. Experiences of harassment, sexism and racism are commonly reported echoing the reality of societal environment. In 2019, the Chinese professional gamer Li Xiaomeng, known as Liooon and world champion of the game Hearthstone, denounced the sexist attacks she regularly suffers and declared her support for female gamers who are also victims of harassment.

Official figures show that only 14% of development studios staff in France are female and 2% are non-binary; 2% of game development professionals identify themselves as Black/African-American/African-Caribbean; and a 2014 US study highlights the absence of racialised characters, particularly racialised women, in fifty popular games, with 3% black characters and 8% female protagonists, while only two of them are a main character in the game (see relevant category: Black characters in video games).

=== "Are video games afraid of black people? " ===
This question was asked in 2015, as part of the round table organised by the media Arrêt sur images.

In France, ethnic statistics are forbidden. There are no figures to assess the place of racialised people in studios, which, for Jennifer Lufau, is a "fairly universal pattern: globally, few minorities work in tech", whereas there is a "real demand from racialised people for studios to put in place concrete measures to change this situation" About 15% of the jobs related to the video game industry are held by women. This lack of representation at the creative level result in stereotypical and hypersexualised portrayals of female characters (see relevant page: gender representation in video games)

Moreover, black heroines are exoticised, in the form of fetishised sex objects, and are dehumanised, presented as aggressive and devoid of feelings. Their physical representation remain superficial because the studios do not take the trouble to create a realistic representation of Afro-textured hair or skin colour. They are rarely cast in leading roles, as studios and investors see them as a risk. The creation of interesting and independent black female characters is a priority. Currently, young female gamers have difficulty identifying with the type of characters on offer. One of Afrogameuses missions is to contact game development studios to explain that these characters based on stereotypes of black women are not welcome (see also: misogynoir).

== Creation ==
At a young age, digital marketing expert Jennifer Lufau realised that, as a gamer, she saw few other women who looked like her and saw herself as a kind of anomaly: female and black. For her, being a black female geek, in the racist and sexist world of gaming, is in itself an activist gesture. It is often the cause of harassment, expressed through regular reception of hateful comments. To avoid this situation, many racialised women in the gaming world use male-sounding pseudonyms.

In 2020, Jennifer Lufau contacted other concerned women through feminist networks, such as Women in Games, and anti-racist groups, such as Black Geeks, in order to share their respective experiences. Together they created the Afrogameuses collective, which was born on Instagram on 14 July 2020, before officially becoming a non-profit association a few months later, thanks to a participatory funding campaign, which ended on 25 September 2020. At that time, similar initiatives were being proposed in English-speaking countries, particularly the United States, but no such structure existed in French.

On 24 October 2020, on the Twitch platform, the collective hosted a masterclass in partnership with the MadmoiZelle channel and, in January 2021, the association signed its first partnership with Maratus Game, an independent Belgian studio, notably the developer of Arisen, a narrative card game about slavery, based on a choice of female, male, binary or non-binary, homosexual, heterosexual and bisexual characters.

In March 2021, nine months after its creation, the Afrogameuses community had more than 3,000 followers on its Twitter account and, on 19 June 2021, the association organised a video game and esports meet-up in Paris, as part of the ParisENVIES project.

== Aim and objectives ==
Afrogameuses is an association that works for a better integration of minorities in the video game sector. Through its support, this inclusive community encourages Afro-descendant gamers and streamers to take their place in the industry. Female gamers and streamers, as well as professionals from the video game industry, are valued and invited to live sessions and masterclasses, to exchange and talk about their career, their profession and the diversity of the sector. Different actions are set up to support female gamers who face intersectional discrimination and to create a space for sharing and education. The association is committed to Afro-feminist action, which aims to defend people victims of both racism and sexism. According to founder Jennifer Lufau, "feminism was not originally conceived for racialised people, and therefore does not have the same objectives. Being black is a social marker in addition to being a woman, and it is something that makes a difference today, all over the world". The main objective is to meet and bring together Afro-descendant women players, with the aim of compensating for their absence in e-sports and streaming, particularly on the French-speaking scene.

The collective's aim is to make visible, in a positive way, different profiles of active Afro-descendant women gamers in France and abroad, in order to pave the way for others; to provide resources against harassment, as well as racist and sexist behaviour online; to point out and find solutions to the often stereotyped, secondary and non-playable black female characters in video games; to demonstrate that gaming is a viable and accessible sector for young black girls. Although the focus is more on Afro-descendant women, the association promotes diversity and inclusion of all genders to influence the video game industry on these issues, both in terms of representation and employment. As black, strong and female characters are scarce in the world of video games and gamers, the actions try to counter this invisibilisation and encourage women to denounce sexist and racist behaviour.

The Afrogameuses association articulates its interventions around four axes. First, it supports the improvement of the representation of racialised people in the world of video games, through the promotion of role models on the various gaming platforms and social networks, with the aim of developing the interest of black women in this field, both to work and to stream. Second, it reinforces the information and support network of the association's members in their projects, through the implementation of coaching workshops, which favour a better professional integration in the video game world. In addition, it offers a support space against harassment linked to the intersectionality of identities and discrimination, designed to receive people who are subject to toxic behaviour, such as racist comments or attacks online, in a framework of sympathetic listening. Finally, it promotes awareness-raising among the general public and support for players in the video game sector, through various events and partnerships, dealing with issues related to diversity and inclusion.

== Actions ==
=== Information and awareness-raising ===
Afrogameuses has a worldwide network of ambassadors who participate in events and engage with the medias on behalf of the association, in order to set up initiatives to promote diversity in video games at the international level.

In partnership with La Féministerie, Afrogameuses organises workshops focusing on the existing stereotypes of black women (see relevant category) and their invisibilisation in the video game industry, whether from the point of view of the players or the characters. Realising the reality of the situation is a first step in deconstructing the unconscious biases that influence sexism and racism.

The collective also organises events that are streamed live on the Twitch streaming platform.

=== Training and support ===
The association offers a mentoring programme between professionals in the video game sector and people from minority backgrounds who wish to enter this field. Since July 2021, the association has been developing a partnership with Gaming Campus and offers a course to discover video game programming, on Unreal Engine 4. The association also offers a partnership programme, which allows companies, schools and associations to take part in the evolution of the industry by participating in various networking events and information sessions. A community of game testers from diverse and mixed populations is available to test new games and exchange with developers. In addition, the association supports members looking for a job in the video game industry and regularly organises masterclasses and coaching workshops with professionals.

Afrogameuses also collaborates with studios in order to raise diversity issues, both in the recruitment process and in the awareness-raising of employees, and also offers its experience for the design of inclusive games.

=== Other actions ===
Afrogameuses relies on a role model system to celebrate black women - streamers, gamers, professionals -, notably through social networks, where a weekly post celebrates the "Afrogameuse of the week".

The association also provides a directory of non-binary women and people from ethnic minorities in the sector. This initiative, called #EllesFontLeGame, lists the affiliated female streamers and video game professionals, in order to give them more visibility.

The collective also contributes to raising the profile and value of African video games, for example by mentioning what they represent in terms of potential for the industry. However, the people able to quote an African video game remain too rare, even though they are often good games that correspond to a local vision.

=== Projects ===
The Afrogameuses association supports studies to measure toxicity targeting Afro-descendant women or people likely to be discriminated against in video games environments. This project, entitled Toxicity in Video Games, is being carried out in collaboration with university researchers, and will make it possible to quantify these behaviours and analyse them, with the aim of determining concrete actions to be taken to combat them.

The collective seeks to deal with the subject of playtesting, testing of a game in the development phase by professionals, with a view to its improvement and wishes to publish a reference guide intended for studio editors.
