= Hearthstone in esports =

Multiplayer video game

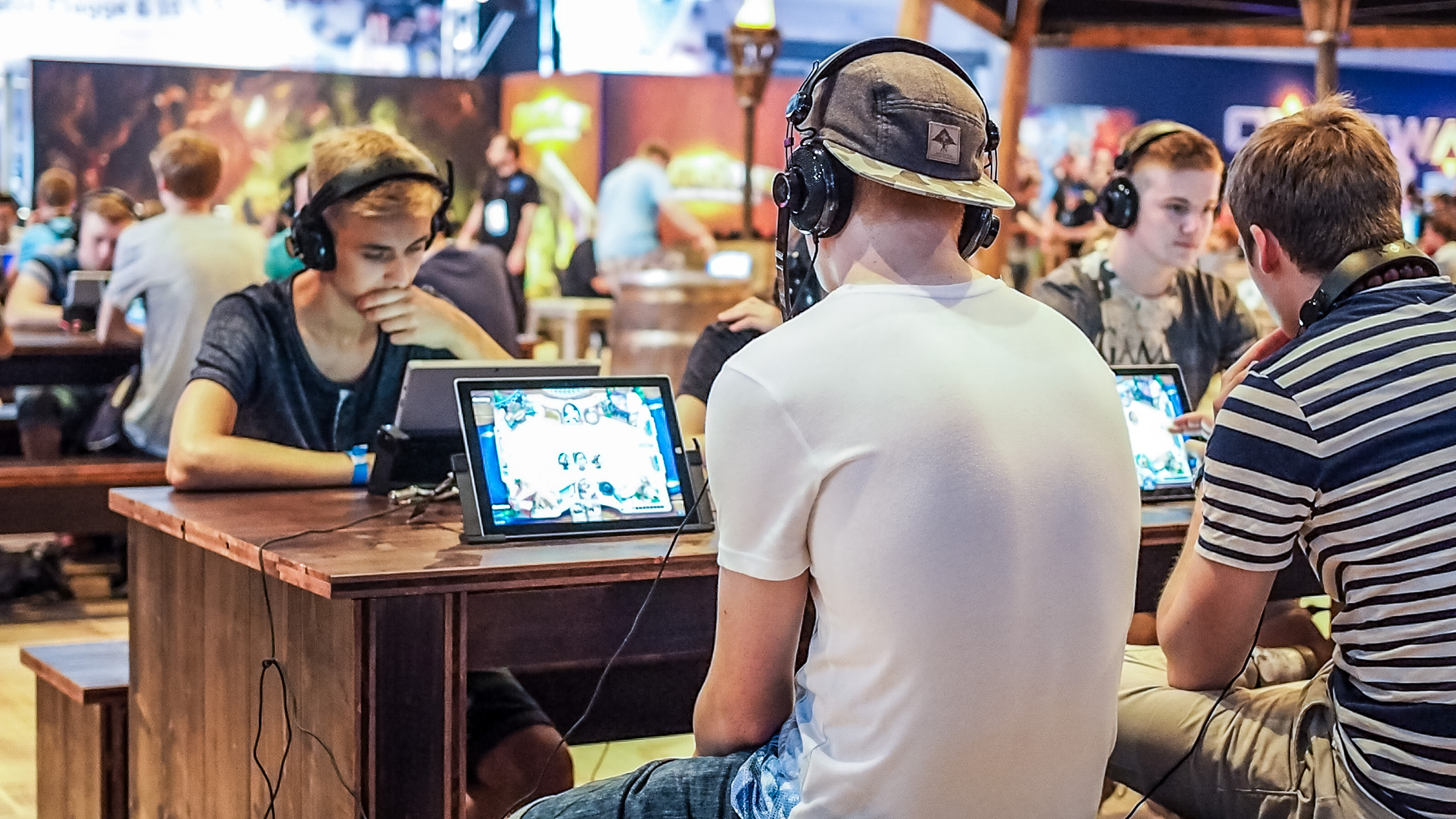
A Hearthstone competition at Gamescom 2015

Blizzard Entertainment's online collectible card game Hearthstone became played professionally quickly after its release in March 2014. The game is played as an esport, with high-level tournaments such as Blizzard's official World Championship featuring prize pool of up to $1 million, and livestreamers can earn money streaming gameplay on Twitch.

== History of Hearthstone competition ==
=== 2013 ===
The first Hearthstone tournament was held at BlizzCon on November 11, 2013, only a few months after the release of the game's closed beta and several months before the official release of the game in March 2014. Blizzard selected eight prominent Hearthstone players to compete at what they titled the "Hearthstone Innkeeper's Invitational". The tournament was won by Artosis, who was subsequently crowned the "Grandmaster of the Hearth".

=== 2014 ===
After the official release of the game in early 2014, more Hearthstone tournaments followed, including events at EGX Rezzed and DreamHack Bucharest. BlizzCon 2014 featured a Hearthstone tournament with a $250,000 USD prize pool, the largest up to that point, and players from the Americas, Europe, and Asia qualified for the event through winning regional tournaments.

In June 2014, the organization of Assembly Summer 2014, a Finnish qualifying tournament for the International e-Sports Federation's (IeSF) World Championship, sparked controversy when it was announced that tournament would be open for men only. The cause was that the World Championship was also slated to have an all-male line-up, and its qualifying events were subject to the same rules. According to the IeSF, the rule was set in place in order to "secure traditional sports status" for esports. The forced gender division was abolished a few days after it was announced for Assembly Summer when the IeSF switched to an "open for all" format.

June also saw a cheating scandal when Radu "Rdu" Dima won first prize and US$10,000 at DreamHack Summer. During Rdu's final match against AmazHS, he got a Battle.net message stating the content of AmazHS' hand. Though the information was no longer relevant in the game, Rdu was upset about the unsolicited help and tournament organizers called for a 20-minute break in which Rdu's "friend list" was deleted, though they decided the round was won fairly. Though AmazHS gave his support to Rdu afterward, he stated that DreamHack should have been better at organizing the tournament and implored Blizzard to implement game modes in which such forms of cheating are not possible.

In Hearthstone's first year, a total of 52 tournaments and series awarded US$1,000 or more to individual players. Over the year, over US$1,000,000 worth of prize money was awarded during 2014, large tournaments being the World Championships and the World Cyber Arena. James "Firebat" Kostesich was the most successful tournament player, winning a total of US$105,650. Fifteen players made above the United States federal minimum wage through tournaments alone in 2014, and many players make more through livestreaming their Hearthstone games.

Hearthstone's inaugural World Championship concluded at BlizzCon 2014 and featured a total prize pool of US$250,000 and the Last Hero Standing format. James "Firebat" Kostesich defeated Wang "Tiddler Celestial" Xieyu in the finals, becoming the first World Champion and earning US$100,000.

=== 2015 ===
In March 2015, Red Bull's Jon Partridge stated that Hearthstone was "emerging as one of the world's top esports." Technology company Nvidia held a professional Hearthstone tournament series that spanned eight weeks, from the end of March to the middle of May, with a total prize pool of US$25,000. The tournament, which was split up in Professional Division of 16 high-level players and an open worldwide Amateur Division, was a qualifying event of the 2015 World Championship.

Blizzard's official 2015 Hearthstone World Championship tournament concluded at BlizzCon 2015. Sixteen players qualified for the event by improving their rankings at Blizzard-sanctioned tournaments. Four players per region eventually qualified for the World Championship by improving their regional rankings in Europe, North and Latin America, China, and Asia-Pacific. This World Championship was the first to be held with the Conquest format with a ban. Swedish player Sebastian "Ostkaka" Engwall defeated Canadian player Dylan "Hotform" Mullins to earn US$100,000 and the title of World Champion.

=== 2016 ===
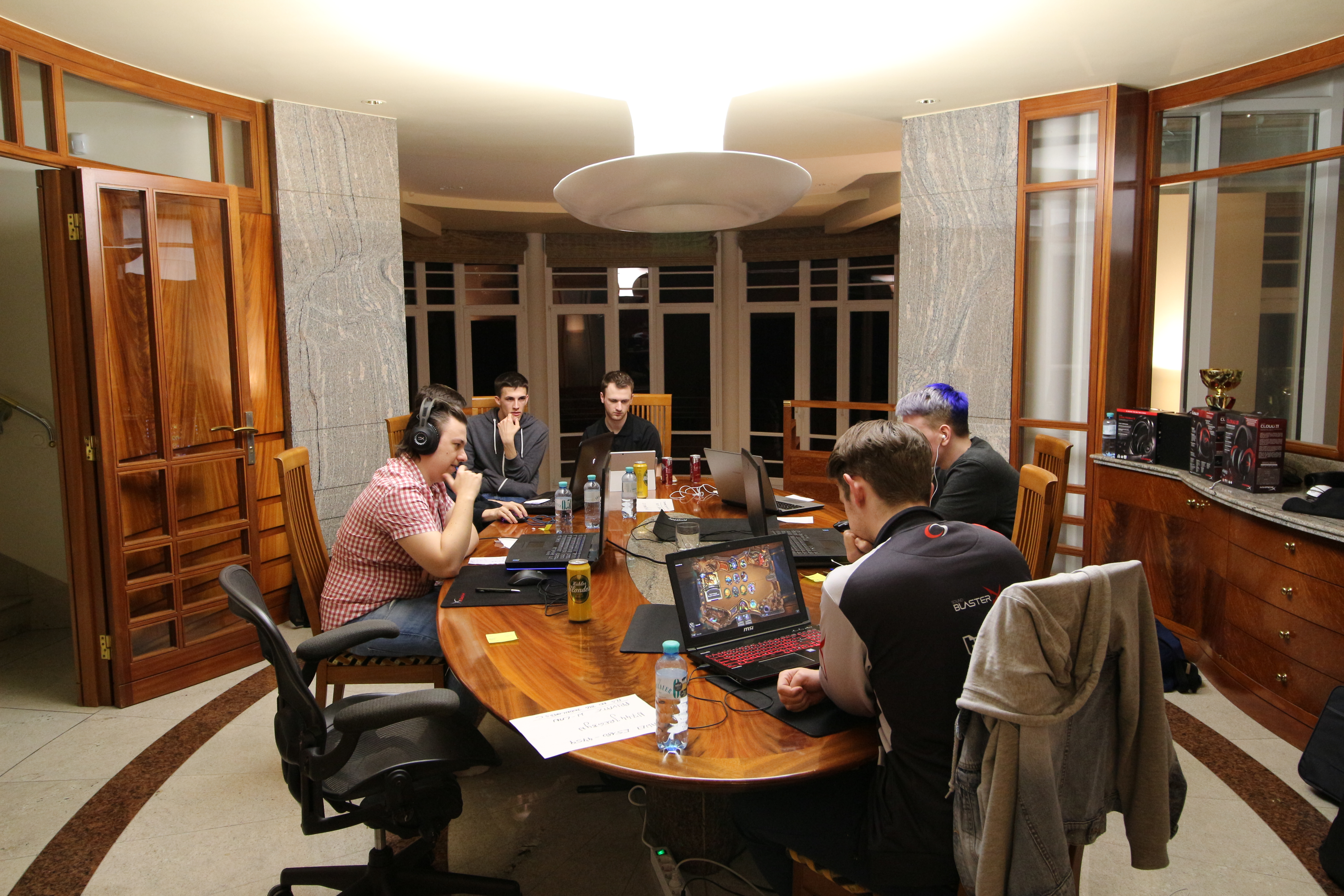
Hearthstone competition "Throne of Cards IV" in Vienna, Austria

In November 2015, Blizzard announced a change in the Hearthstone season structure, where the game's esports calendar would be split into Summer, Fall, Winter, and Spring seasons, each running for three months. Players have to earn enough HCT points in order to qualify for major tournaments at the end of each season which are held in three of the game's regions. Companies like Kyoto esports, StriveWire, and Zotac host tournaments that give players points to qualify for the seasonal major tournaments. The winners of each tournament qualified automatically for the World Championship. Through this setup, 12 players qualify for the event, while Blizzard appoints four players from China in some other manner. The 2016 Hearthstone World Tour featured over US$1,900,000 in prize money.

The third Hearthstone World Championship had two stages: group stage and playoffs. Playoffs was held at BlizzCon 2016 on November 5 while group stage, at which eight players moving on to playoffs were decided, was held one week earlier. Both stages of the tournament were with the Conquest format and a prize pool of US$1,000,000, four times as much as in 2015. Group stage was played in double-elimination format, and playoffs was played in single-elimination format.

This was the first and the only Hearthstone World Championship so far where every game was best-of-seven, which means players chose five classes prior to the tournament while one class would be banned from use by one's opponent every game. This was also the only Hearthstone World Championship that top eight players were permitted to change their lineups before playoffs. The eventual winner was Russian Pavel "Pavel" Beltiukov, who defeated Artem "DrHippi" Karevets to earn the top prize of US$250,000.

Pavel managed to pull two successive reverse sweeps in the last game of group stage and quarterfinal, denying both opponents from winning a single druid game out of eight. Pavel was also the only player who decided to keep the exactly same lineup from group stage to playoffs, while Hamster from China and Cydonia from Canada being the other two players who kept the same five classes from group stage, though they did make some small adjustments to their decks.

=== 2017 ===
The 2017 Hearthstone World Championship is the fourth year of the Hearthstone World Championship. Breaking from the tradition of previous years, the 2017 Hearthstone World Championship took place in January 2018 in Amsterdam, Netherlands, instead of during BlizzCon near the end of the year. The winner was Chen "Tom60229" WeiLin from Taiwan, who defeated Frank "Fr0zen" Zhang to earn the top prize of US$250,000.

=== 2018 ===
During the 2018 Hearthstone World Championship in Taipei, Taiwan it was announced that the 2019 World Championship would be held in April 2019 in the same city with a $1 million prize pool.

=== 2019 ===
Blizzard is replacing the previously used tour system with three variations of a single class deck called "Specialist". More than $4 million will be available in the prize pool. Blizzard will hold the first tournaments primarily online and will be region-locked. The winners will go on to compete in the live global tournaments throughout 2019. The fifth Hearthstone World Championship took place in April 2019 and was held in Taipei; the winner was Norwegian Casper "Hunterace" Notto that received $250,000.

Grandmasters Season 2 will remove the Specialist format used in Season 1. Instead, players will bring four decks, each from a different class. Before the match begins, each player chooses a deck to "shield", which means the other player cannot ban it. Then each player will ban one deck from the opponent. If a player wins with a deck, then the next match another deck must be played. If a player loses, then they can replay the deck.

In October 2019, Blizzard announced it would ban a player for one year from competing and forfeited all of his winnings earned during Season 2 because he spoke in support of the 2019–20 Hong Kong protests during a tournament interview, which violated the rule against promoting a political stance during a broadcast. A few days later, Blizzard revised its decision so it gave back the prize money and reduced the suspension to six months.

The sixth Hearthstone World Championship winner was Chinese Xiaomeng "VKLiooon" Li, who lives in China that received $200,000; VKLiooon was also the first woman to win a Hearthstone world championship and to win a BlizzCon tournament.

=== 2020 ===
The seventh Hearthstone World Championship winner was Japanese Kenta "Glory" Sato that received $200,000, beating Jaromír "Jarla" Vyskočil from Czech.

=== 2021 ===
The eighth Hearthstone World Championship winner was Japanese Wataru "Posesi" Ishibashi that received $200,000. He defeated the 2020 Hearthstone World Champion, Kenta "Glory" Sato, in the final round to win the title. This was also the first ever time that the defending champion qualified for the next World Championship tournament, but Kenta "Glory" Sato ended up just one series away from winning it back-to-back.

=== 2022 ===
The ninth Hearthstone World Championship winner was German Raphael "Bunnyhoppor" Peltzer that received $100,000. He defeated Jack "DeadDraw" Bancroft, who was his teammate in Team Liquid at the point, in the final.

The defending champion Wataru "Posesi" Ishibashi also qualified for the tournament and he ended up losing in the quarterfinal. Also, the 2020 World Championship final was replayed in the last game of group B, with Jaromír "Jarla" Vyskočil taking his revenge on Sato "Glory" Kenta this time.

=== 2023 ===
The tenth Hearthstone World Championship winner was British Thomas "PocketTrain" Swinton that received $100,000. He defeated "CJkaka" from Taiwan in the final. En route he defeated fellow countryman, practice partner and sometimes friend British Thomas "Meati" Wayland.

=== 2024 ===
The eleventh Hearthstone World Championship winner was Chinese player "mlYanming(陌路烟明)" who received $100,000.

== List of finals ==
Year	Champion	Score	Runner-up	Prize money		
Year	Champion	Score	Runner-up	Total	Champion	Runner-up
2013	(United States) Artosis	3-2	(United States) Kripparrian	-	-	-
2014	(United States) Firebat	3-0	(China) TiddlerCelestial	$250,000	$100,000	$50,000
2015	(Sweden) Ostkaka	3-0	(Canada) Hotform	$250,000	$100,000	$50,000
2016	(Russia) Pavel	4-2	(Ukraine) DrHippi	$1,000,000	$250,000	$150,000
2017	(Taiwan) Tom60229	3-2	(United States) Fr0zen	$1,000,000	$250,000	$150,000
2018	(Norway) Hunterace	3-2	(Germany) Viper	$1,000,000	$250,000	$150,000
2019	(China) Liooon	3-0	(United States) bloodyface	$500,000	$200,000	$100,000
2020	(Japan) glory	3-1	(Czech Republic) Jarla	$500,000	$200,000	$100,000
2021	(Japan) posesi	3-2	(Japan) glory	$500,000	$200,000	$100,000
2022	(Germany) Bunnyhoppor	3-1	(United Kingdom) DeadDraw	$500,000	$100,000	$70,000
2023	(United Kingdom) PocketTrain	3-0	(Taiwan) CJkaka	$350,000	$100,000	$50,000
2024	(China) mlYanming	3-2	(Denmark) Furyhunter	$500,000	$100,000	$60,000
2025	(China) XiaoT	3-1	(South Korea) Definition	$500,000	$100,000	$60,000
2026	(China) OTGxhh	3-1	(China) XiaoT	$500,000	$100,000	$60,000

== Streaming ==
For many professional Hearthstone players, rather than tournament earnings, livestreaming is their main source of income. In 2014, Kinguin project coordinator Giovanni Varriale stated that Hearthstone was one of the most popular games on Twitch, with "thousands of people spend[ing] hours watching the best players in action."

== Game design ==
Hearthstone is a digital and online card game, comparable to traditional collectible card games such as Magic: The Gathering.

=== Expansions ===
The game features a large amount of inherent randomness as calculated through a random number generator (a property referred to as "RNG"). Some cards may have excessively random effects and may be able to completely sway a game through RNG. Various fans are worried about the future of the game's competitive scene due to unbalanced cards being introduced in new expansions. In an interview with Polygon, Hearthstone associate designer Dean Ayala stated that newly introduced cards can add to the strategy of the game, and that expanding Hearthstone is "all about finding the balance with what is ok and what isn't ok." Ayala explained that a large part of adding new cards to the game is trying to view each card through the lens of each possible type of player and how the card may be used.

== Culture ==
The practice of "win trading", where players forfeit games in order to help other players gain in ranking, can be used to reach Legend ranking with less effort. However, win trading is considered cheating, and Blizzard gives out permanent bans for people who indulge in the practice.

In 2014, professional coaching services became popular, where high-level players discuss strategies with their clients and give tips for improvement.

In August 2014, competitive Hearthstone player Ryan "Realz" Masterson was hired by Blizzard in order to help with the balancing of the game.

== Controversy ==
During a GrandMasters Season 2 match on October 6, 2019, player Chung "Blitzchung" Ng Wai made statements in support of the ongoing protests in Hong Kong. During a post-match interview on the official Taiwanese broadcast, Blitzchung wore ski goggles and a respirator mask similarly to the protesters, and used the popular pro-democracy slogan "Liberate Hong Kong, revolution of our time". Blizzard considered the gesture to be a violation of rules forbidding players from engaging in conduct that "brings [the player] into public disrepute, offends a portion or group of the public or otherwise damages" the reputation of the company. As a result, Blizzard removed Blitzchung from the tournament, rescinded his Season 2 prize winnings, and banned him from Hearthstone competitions for one year. Blizzard also terminated its contract with the two casters involved in the broadcast. Blizzard stated that while it "[stands] by one's right to express individual thoughts and opinions", players were still subject to their official rules and regulations during competition.

The removal of Blitzchung led to criticism of Blizzard and calls for a boycott of the company. As coverage of the protests have been subject to censorship in mainland China, critics considered the decision to be an act of self-censorship intended to appease Chinese investors and stakeholders. Chinese conglomerate Tencent owns a minority stake in Activision Blizzard. Comparisons were also drawn with a recent controversy involving Daryl Morey, owner of the Houston Rockets basketball team, over a Twitter posting that similarly pledged support for the protests. The developers of the similar game Gods Unchained invited Blitzchung to its own tournament, offering to also repay the winnings that Blizzard had rescinded.
