= Tempo Storm =

Game developer and former esports team

AVY Entertainment, Inc.
- Trade name: Tempo
- Formerly: Tempo Storm
- Type: Private
- Industry: Video games
- Incorporated: 2018
- Founded: 2014
- Founder: Andrey "Reynad" Yanyuk
- Products: The Bazaar
- Revenue: ▼US$6.3 million (2025)
- Operating income: ▼US$−4.9 million (2025)
- Net income: ▼US$−3.6 million (2025)
- Owner: Andrey Yanyuk (49%); Galaxy Interactive (31%)
- Number of employees: 10 (2025)
- Website: tempogames.com

Tempo (formerly Tempo Storm) is an American game development studio, and former esports team and media company.

They have formerly held divisions in Age of Empires II, FIFA, Magic: The Gathering, fighting games, Shadowverse, Hearthstone, Heroes of the Storm, Fortnite, League of Legends, Counter-Strike: Global Offensive, Overwatch, Vainglory, Tom Clancy's Rainbow Six Siege, World of Warcraft, and PlayerUnknown's Battlegrounds.

The company is registered as AVY Entertainment, Inc, and does business as Tempo.

== Esports ==
=== History ===
Andrey "Reynad" Yanyuk began streaming in 2012, and by the end of 2013 had 20,000 concurrent viewers on Hearthstone beta content. Unhappy with payment offers and lack of marketing around players from esports teams, he founded Tempo Storm in May 2014 with the intent of focusing on individual players and entertainment. The team began with three players. Through the next four years, they provided guides from pro players and released power rankings on decks, something other esports organizations did not do.

In 2015, Tempo Storm parted ways with its player Hyerim "MagicAmy" Lee, following accusations of account boosting and win trading by disgraced former teammate Eric "Specialist" Lee and two pros from Team Dignitas, as well as accusations that she was not who she claimed to be. The investigation by Tempo Storm found "We believe that MagicAmy is one person and that Hyerim Lee is indeed who she claims to be." and that "win trading is an unlikely scenario considering how aggressively Blizzard banned notable win-traders, including Specialist, the spark of the entire controversy." The team then states they offered to fully support MagicAmy attempting to clear her name, but she decided to take a leave of absence from Hearthstone. Later that month, Reynad, speaking on stream, said "I've never actually been so embarrassed to be a Hearthstone player before last week. All of you should be fucking ashamed of yourselves and it's probably the biggest setback to getting women into esports that I can recall happening in the past year or two," and "We never even fired her, she just didn't want to play anymore because of all the shit that happened."

By 2016, the team fielded rosters on seven different esports.

In 2017, the company expanded into a full media company with a production team, doing live events, online productions, and game development. According to Reynad, "All of these things were really big steps for the company, and it's moving Tempo Storm to be more like Disney and less like a sports team. The idea is that we're a media company, and instead of movies being our flagship product it will be games. I think Tempo Storm is really far along in that model."

By December 2018, the team had around forty players.

On October 24, 2019, Tempo Storm announced they had signed banned Hearthstone player Wai Chung "blitzchung" Ng. Blitzchung had made international news earlier that month after Hearthstone developer Blizzard Entertainment banned him for twelve months (later shortened to six) for supporting the Hong Kong protests against the Chinese government, with an ensuing backlash against Blizzard from the community. Reynad told ESPN "Tempo is proud of the stance Blitzchung took, and of the courage needed to take it."

On July 4, 2020, Tempo posted a statement that it would cut ties with Super Smash Bros. player and streamer Gonzalo "ZeRo" Barrios following accusations of sexual misconduct towards minors, and ZeRo's confession to those allegations. The team promised to extend professional support to the victims and connect ZeRo with professional counsel and other rehabilitation resources.

In March 2022, Tempo Storm's Rainbow Six Siege Pro League slot was purchased by esports organization Beastcoast.

== Owner ==
Andrey "Reynad" Yanyuk is the owner and founder of Tempo Storm. Yanyuk has placed top 4 in Dreamhack and won multiple online tournaments such as Battle of the Best.

== Former divisions ==
=== Fighting games ===
Tempo Storm expanded into the FGC on March 9, 2015, beginning with the sponsorship of Christopher "NYChrisG" Gonzalez. On July 2, 2015, Weston "Westballz" Dennis and Jeffrey "Axe" Williamson joined Tempo Storm. On March 1, 2016, NYChrisG was released from Tempo Storm as his contract expired. Westballz left Tempo Storm to join G2 Esports on July 11, 2016. On July 14, 2016, Tempo Storm announced the signing of Johnny "S2J" Kim. On November 7, 2018, Tempo Storm announced the signing of Gonzalo "ZeRo" Barrios. The organization would later drop ZeRo on July 20, 2020, following sexual assault claims made against him, which he subsequently admitted to.

=== Shadowverse ===
Tempo Amon is a part of the organization and plays Shadowverse for them. He placed top 96 in SVO 2025.

=== Age of Empires ===
Tempo Storm formerly sponsored two players, Hamzah El-Baher and Kai Kallinger, who were better known as Hera and Liereyy respectively.

Hera's biggest achievements in 2020 include winning Battle of Africa 2, and placing 2nd in Hidden Cup 3, Nili's Apartment Cup 3, Redbull Wololo 2 and winning Hidden Cup IV . Hera continues to compete at the highest level of Age of Empires II while also being one of the game's most popular content creators on Twitch and YouTube. On August 18, 2021, Hera announced on Twitter that he would be leaving Tempo Storm and rejoining his old team, Aftermath.

Liereyy signed with Tempo Storm on October 3, 2020. He announced he was leaving Tempo Storm on July 29, 2021, in a YouTube video posted on his channel.

=== Counter-Strike: Global Offensive ===
On February 12, 2016, Tempo Storm picked up the Brazilian CS:GO roster of Games Academy. Four days later the newly signed team upset several top North American teams to qualify for Intel Extreme Masters Season X - Katowice. Tempo Storm won the CEVO Gfinity Season 9 Finals on May 3, 2016, where they beat Virtus.pro in the semi-finals and SK Gaming in the finals. On May 8, 2016, the team placed second at DreamHack Austin 2016, losing to fellow Brazilian team Luminosity Gaming in the finals. Tempo Storm went on to sell the roster to Immortals on June 1, 2016.

On August 11, 2017, Tempo Storm picked up two rosters. The first roster consists of former players of paiN Gaming and Luminosity Gaming The second team, named Tempo Storm SE, was formed from mainly former players of Rogue Academy.

=== Fortnite ===
Tempo Storm joined Fortnite esports with a four player roster February 25, 2018.

=== Hearthstone ===
Tempo Storm's Hearthstone roster consisted of Andrey "Reynad" Yanyuk, Dan "Frodan" Chou, Petar "Gaara" Stevanovic, Johnnie "Ratsmah" Lee, David "Justsaiyan" Shan, and Haiyun "Eloise" Tang. In November 2016, the team won the Red Bull Team Brawl, defeating Team Liquid 3–1 in the final.

Hyerim "MagicAmy" Lee left Tempo Storm February 17, 2015, following accusations of being a fake identity and account boosting and win trading.

On May 5, 2015, Tempo Storm added Johnnie "Ratsmah" Lee, a Hearthstone arena specialist to the roster.

On June 9, 2015, David "Justsaiyan" Shan and Haiyun "Eloise" Tang joined Tempo Storm.

On October 14, 2016, Victor "VLPS" Lopez joined the team.

Trump was signed by Tempo Storm in 2017 after leaving Team Solo Mid due to disagreements. Trump left Tempo Storm in 2018 on good terms.

=== Heroes of the Storm ===
On June 2, 2015, Tempo Storm's Heroes of the Storm team swept Cloud9 Maelstrom in WCA NA final. Tempo Storm received 7–8th at the 2015 Heroes of the Storm World Championship in November. On November 9, 2015, Tempo Storm dropped Zuna and Arthelon.

On June 28, 2016, Tempo Storm ceased sponsorship of their North American Heroes of the Storm team. On July 20, 2016, Tempo Storm signed world champions Tempest, a South Korean Heroes of the Storm team. That roster disbanded on November 2, 2016, after reaching 4th place in OGN Super League Season 3 and thus failing to qualify for the Fall Global Championship at BlizzCon.

Prior to the start of the 2017 Heroes Global Circuit, Tempo Storm re-entered the North American professional scene by signing the former Astral Authority roster on January 5, 2017. This iteration of the Tempo Storm Roster went on to win 1st in the Heroes of the Storm Global Championship Pro League Phase 1 for North America.

=== League of Legends ===
In Spring Split of 2017, Tempo Storm picked up a professional League of Legends team to compete in the North American Challenger Series (NACS).

In the Summer Split of the North American Challenger Series, they introduced a new roster. while keeping Diego "Quas" Ruiz and Jamie "Sheep" Gallagher. In late 2017, Tempo Storm's academy dissolved.

=== Overwatch ===
Tempo Storm expanded its presence in Esports on August 17, 2016, by signing the Australian team formerly known as Untitled Spreadsheet (captained by James "Yuki" Stanton and manager Philip Pretty). Two weeks later, on August 31, Tempo Storm formed a new North American team (captained by David "NapTime" Fox and manager Shane "Dvexx" Waters) that would compete in the pro league. The North American roster was updated on May 2, 2017, and the Australian Overwatch Team was let go at the same time. Tempo Storm does not currently have any active Overwatch team.

The former North American team competed in the Overwatch Contenders Cup, a tournament that took place the weekend of June 3, 2017, with over 600 teams competing. Tempo Storm made it to group stages with 16 other teams including Team Liquid and Cloud9.

=== Tom Clancy's Rainbow Six Siege ===
On July 25, 2019, Tempo Storm signed retired Rainbow Six Siege pro and streamer, Steven "Snake_Nade" White as a streamer. On November 29, 2019, Tempo Storm signed the Pro League team, 2Faced. The original Tempo Storm Rainbow Six Siege lineup consisted of Alex "Butterz" O'Campo, Tim "Creators" Humpherys, Mitchell "Dream" Malson, Xavier "Filthy" Garcia, Giuliano "Krazy" Solon, Trevor "KenZ" Kenzie as Coach, and Tanner "Forceful" McHattie and David "DnA" Thomas as analysts.

=== Vainglory ===
On April 15, 2017, Tempo Storm signed the team 101 as its new Vainglory team. The team consisted of Alonso "Selena" Lara, Rhodney "Hide" Nerves, Christopher "LostBoyToph" Basco and Christopher "Poli5208" Keokot. Tempo Storm announced they were parting ways with the roster on November 21, 2017.

== Video production ==
=== Game Changers ===
On April 9, 2018, Reynad uploaded a trailer for Game Changers, a livestreamed travel and lifestyle show with the intent to push the format of IRL streaming forward. The program was partnered with Red Bull.

== The Bazaar ==
=== Development ===
On April 6, 2018, owner Andrey "Reynad" Yanyuk posted a Youtube video announcing that he was developing a digital card game called The Bazaar, inspired by games Ascension and Star Realms. He aimed to fix, in his view, the number one complaint in card games: the pay-to-win or pay-to-play model. He wanted "players to feel like they weren't at a disadvantage because someone has invested more money than them." Initially, he designed the game on a few hundred blank playing cards, and then hired some developers on a short-term contract to start building a digital version. Alongside the announcement was an Indiegogo campaign, which raised more than $115,000.

Tempo Storm opened pre-orders in 2019. In April 2020, they announced they had raised $3.3 million in investment. From February to December in 2022, the frequency of developer updates and Twitch live streams fell, and the game's Twitter account was inactive most of the year. Three developers hired the previous year left the company, and another announced on January 3, 2023, that they had been laid off. On October 11, 2024, Reynad posted an official update announcing a closed beta beginning October 30, and open beta in December, and a worldwide release in January 2025. To access the closed beta, players could purchase a Founder's Pack or receive the one extra code given to each buyer, while the open beta and worldwide release were to be free-to-play. The game required its own launcher and was not available on Steam, with no plans to bring it there.

On March 4, 2025, it was announced that the game would be receiving a prize pass, including 10-card expansions exclusive to paying users for the first month. Players were upset by the change in policy, given promises to avoid card-collecting and a pay-to-win model. Reynad's response was received poorly, saying on Discord that "seeing Reddit lose it today lets me breathe a huge sigh of relief," and "Monetization feedback is negative 100% of the time for 100% of solvent games. It's the boy who cried pay-to-win and the least honest of all game feedback." This controversy at the time of launch had a negative impact on the broader perception of the game.

The official launch came with Season One on April 2, 2025. The Prize Pass was made free, with an option to pay to skip levels to unlock content immediately. After a season ended, the cards would be available for all players. The changes were well received. A new hero, Mak, was also added.

In August 2025, the free-to-play model was abandoned and the game launched on Steam under a new pay-to-play model, despite previous assertions that it would stay exclusive to the Tempo launcher. This caused controversy, though anyone who purchased the game would be grandfathered in if they elected to continue playing on the proprietary launcher rather than Steam. The base game included the heroes Pygmalien, Vanessa, and Dooley, while Mak and Stelle were available as DLCs. Tempo stated the constant changes in direction had caused friction for players, but they hoped it would be the final time the game would undergo massive system updates.

=== Gameplay ===
The game uses asynchronous multiplayer. According to Reynad, it was a hard design decision to make because there weren't any games on the market doing that when they announced it. Soon after, Super Auto Pets and Backpack Battles came out, and people became more receptive to the idea.
