= Amaz (gamer) =

Chinese-Canadian video game player

- Born: Jason Chan; April 12, 1991 (age 35); Hong Kong
- Occupation: Twitch streamer

Twitch information
- Channel: Amaz
- Games: Hearthstone; Magic: The Gathering; Teamfight Tactics; Slay the Spire
- Followers: 826 thousand

YouTube information
- Channel: AmazHS
- Years active: 2014–present
- Genre: Gaming
- Subscribers: 367 thousand
- Views: 290 million
- Last updated: October 20, 2024

Jason Chan (born April 12, 1991), better known as Amaz, is a Hong Kong-Canadian professional video game player best known for streaming Hearthstone on Twitch. Chan now plays for NRG, having left the Hearthstone team he created, Team Archon. He was Team Liquid's first Hearthstone streamer as well as a commentator for the Hearthstone World Championship.

== Early life ==
Chan was born in Hong Kong on April 12, 1991. He later moved to Vancouver with his mother when he was in fourth grade, leaving his father behind. There he quickly learned English in his English as a second language (ESL) classes and was introduced to computer games by his cousin. After playing Warcraft III and World of Warcraft, he became a self-described "Blizzard fanboy".

During high school, Chan and his mother moved back to Hong Kong to live with his father. He had to attend international school due to losing most of his Chinese language knowledge during his time in Canada. He later attended University of Waterloo where he studied mathematics. In 2011, his mother died from intestinal cancer, after which he put his studies on hold to move back with his family.

== Career ==
In 2013, Chan started an office job his uncle introduced him to in Hong Kong. After deeming it "boring," he earned his diploma and soon after tutored children in saxophone. He also worked on the board game Scribe's Arena, which he conceptualized in high school.

Chan started to stream on Twitch in late 2013 after a friend suggested him to. He considers himself lucky to have queued many of his games into fellow Hearthstone streamer, Artosis. This drew Chan a high of 20,000 concurring viewers.

=== Hearthstone ===
Chan was the first member of Team Liquid's Hearthstone division. In the Blizzard 2014 Stream Awards, Chan won the "Best Hearthstone Streamer in 2014" award in the poll categories. He came in second place for "Most Active Chat" and fifth place for "Highest Mean Viewership" for overall Blizzard games on Twitch. In November 2014, Chan formed Team Archon after leaving Team Liquid. He immediately signed the Blizzcon 2014 November Hearthstone world champion James "Firebat" Kostesich.

Chan commentated the 2015 Hearthstone World Championship along with his colleagues Kripparrian and Frodan.

Chan voice acted some of the Blackrock Mountain expansion cards for Hearthstone's Cantonese and Taiwanese languages. On September 6, 2016, Chan left Team Archon, which he created, and joined NRG eSports.

Chan produced the Amaz Team League Championships (ATLC), later called "the most successful third-party tournament in Hearthstone." On October 31, 2016, Chan started a Kickstarter for ATLC 2, but cancelled it after two weeks due to insufficient funding.

=== Magic: The Gathering ===
Other than Hearthstone, he is also an occasional player and streamer of Magic: The Gathering (and its digital counterparts Magic: The Gathering Online and Magic: The Gathering Arena).

In June 2016, he was given a special invitation by Wizards of the Coast to play in Pro Tour Kyoto 2017. A year later, he was again invited to Pro Tour Minneapolis 2018, also being invited playing an exhibition match celebrating the 25th Anniversary of the game. His team achieved a Top 32 finish in the main event. While he managed to get into the finals of the exhibition match, only losing to 2017 Hearthstone Global Games winning member Stanislav Cifka (who is also the winner of Pro Tour Seattle 2012)

After the two special invitations in 2017 and 2018, he had been actively participating on both paper and digital Magic events, including two Grand Prix top 8 finishes in the 2018–19 season (as of May 1, 2019). In August 2019, he was disqualified from the Las Vegas Grand Prix following an incident with a tournament judge.

Currently, he is sponsored by ChannelFireball as a regular streamer and video producer for Magic: The Gathering Arena.

==== Tournament results ====
Season	Event type	Location	Format	Date	Rank
2018–19	Grand Prix	Mexico City	Limited	6–7 October 2018	3
2018–19	Grand Prix	London	Limited	27-28 April 2019	7

Last updated: April 28, 2019
Source: Event Coverage at Wizards.com

=== Other games ===
Chan was invited by tournament host Pokimane to "TFT Thursday", a Teamfight Tactics tournament held on July 4, 2019.
