= Jennifer Lufau =

Beninese blogger

- Born: 1993 (age 32–33); Togo
- Occupations: Digital marketer; consultant of diversity, equity, and inclusion, sensitivity reader
- Employer(s): Independent; Ubisoft (former)
- Known for: Anti-misogynoir activist in the video game community
- Website: jenniferlufau.com

Jennifer Lufau (born in 1993 in Togo) is a gamer, and an expert in digital marketing, who is based in Paris, France.

She is the founder and president of the Afrogameuses, an association which fights against racism and sexism (see: misogynoir) in the field of video games and tries to promote better representation of black women. Active and involved in the field of video games, she is also the author of the blog "Call me Jane Bond".

In November 2020, Vanity Fair elected Jennifer Lufau as one of the "fifty French women who made 2020".

== Life ==
Jennifer Lufau was born in Togo in 1993. She grew up in Benin, then moved to France around the age of seven. She played a lot of video games during her childhood.

She worked as a Social Media & Content Manager at Ubisoft for two years. She is an expert in digital marketing, and now works as a consultant in diversity and inclusion (D&I) and sensitivity reader in the field of video games. In 2016, she defended her thesis on video games at the Sorbonne for her master's in international project management. She is also the author of a professional thesis entitled “How Big Data is already transforming marketing? », published in July 2017.

As a child, she frequented a cybercafé every day after school to play Prince of Persia. Later she played League of Legends, Mortal Kombat and Tekken. Around her, there was no girl to share her passion, and it was not a subject addressed by her classmates. Once she arrived in France, she remained without a computer for a long time, and it was only around the age of seventeen that she began to play regularly again. Once again, she found, that she was one of the few young women to play. As an adult, another question arose for her: “Where are the black women in video games? ». She realized that as a player, she saw herself as a kind of anomaly: female and black. She met extraordinary people on multi-player game platforms, and appreciated the socializing aspect which allowed her to make many friends. However, “this is not the world of Care Bears, far from it”.

For Jennifer Lufau, being a black woman geek, in the racist and sexist world of gaming, was in itself a militant gesture. She suffered through the regular receipt of hateful comments. "Playing black characters is a real “insult magnet”. To avoid this situation, many racialized women evolved in this environment under male-sounding nicknames. Too often a witness, but also a victim, of discriminatory behavior, she reported being often the victim of racism in the world of streaming and deplored the fact that the only possible action to counter insults is to ban, report and block people. However, these people retain “the possibility of endlessly reproducing these same insults". For her, it is up to the platforms to take their responsibilities; for example, she cites Twitch. In fact, the players develop many avoidance strategies to dodge this harassment. For example, by modifying their nicknames, by deactivating their microphones or by playing male characters, because these are “reputed to be stronger, more virile”, the female characters being considered as weak characters.

Inspired by the Black Lives Matter movement, she embarked on writing an article on the Afrogamer community, which she published on the "Call me Jane Bond" blog, which she has been running since April 2020. Her meetings with other women in the same situation allow her to discuss their respective experiences. This is how she created, with three other women, on 14 July 2020, the "Afrogameuses" collective, with the aim of remedying this lack of visibility, by contacting concerned women through feminist networks, such as such as Women in Games, and anti-racist groups, such as Black Geeks. Since then, this association has been actively campaigning to make the video game industry more inclusive, denouncing racism and sexism and calling on companies in the sector to take up the subject.

In August 2020, the Swiss television channel Radio Télévision Suisse (RTS) devoted part of its program "Vertigo" to her, in a report entitled “Being a racialized woman in the sexist universe of video games”.
