= 2015 Heroes of the Storm World Championship =

Esports competition

Tournament information
- Sport: Heroes of the Storm
- Location: Anaheim, California, US
- Dates: October 28–November 7, 2015
- Administrator: Activision Blizzard
- Venue: Anaheim Convention Center

The 2015 Heroes of the Storm World Championship was first annual world championship for Heroes of the Storm, and was held at BlizzCon from October 28 to November 7, 2015. Cloud9 won the tournament with a roster of DunkTrain, Fan, iDream, k1pro, and KingCaffeine. There was a total of US$1.2 million given out as prize money.

== Final standings ==
Place	Team	Prize money
1st	Cloud9	$200,000
2nd	Team Dignitas	$50,000
3rd–4th	Team DK KR	$20,000
3rd–4th	Natus Vincere	$20,000
5–6th	Brave Heart	$20,000
5–6th	Team YL	$20,000
7–8th	Tempo Storm	$12,000
7–8th	GIA	$12,000
