= DreamHack Open Austin 2016 =

Esports tournament in Austin, Texas

- 2016
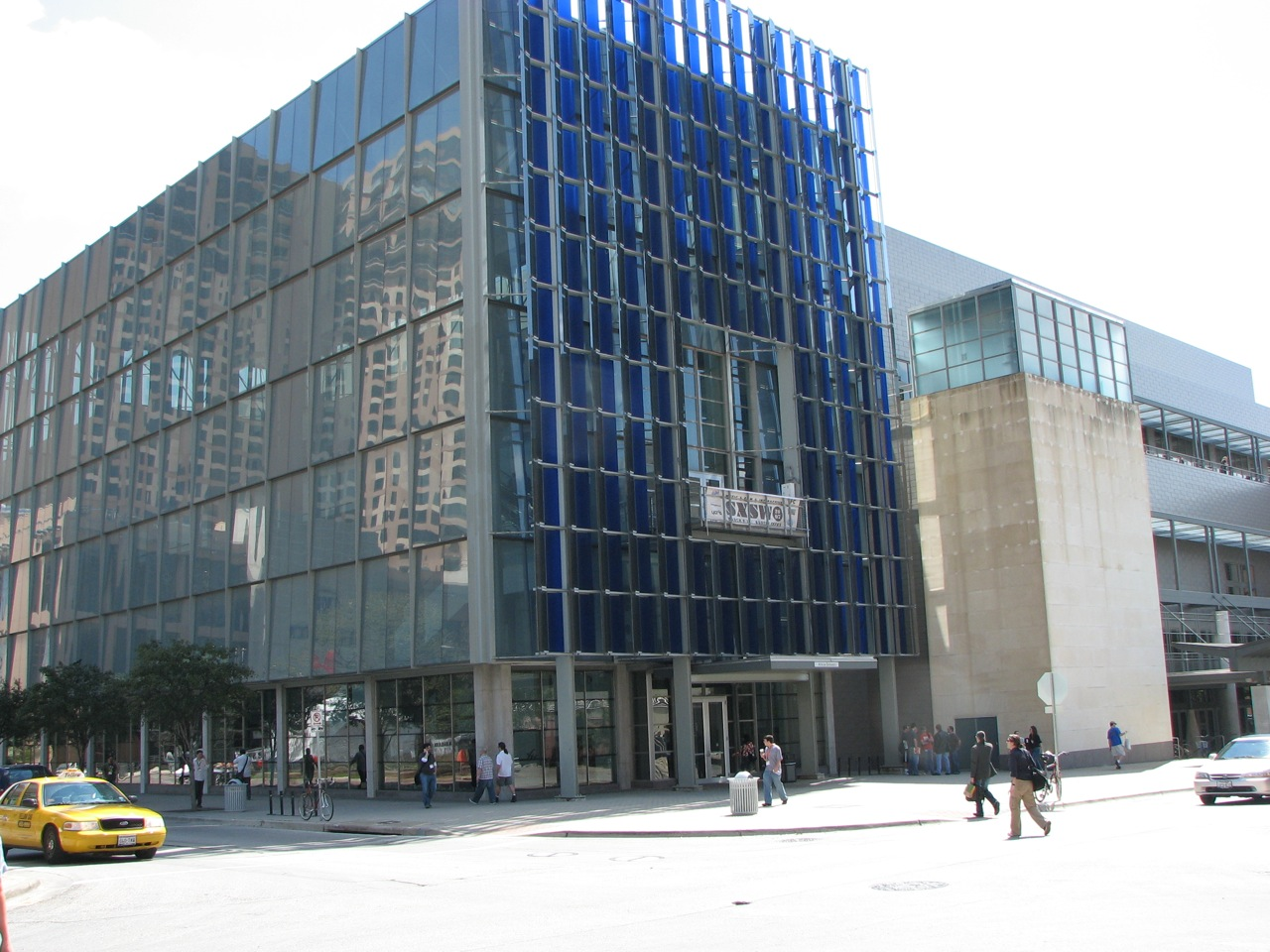
- Venue for DH Austin

Tournament information
- Location: Austin, Texas
- Dates: May 6, 2016–May 8, 2016
- Administrator: DreamHack
- Tournament format(s): 8 team GSL group stage Four team single-elimination playoff
- Venue: Austin Convention Center
- Teams: 8 teams
- Purse: $100,000 USD

Final positions
- Champions: Luminosity Gaming
- 1st runners-up: Tempo Storm
- 2nd runners-up: Cloud9; Team Liquid
- MVP: Gabriel "FalleN" Toledo

DreamHack Open Austin 2016 was a Counter-Strike: Global Offensive LAN Tournament hosted by the Swedish eSports company DreamHack. It took place from May 6–8 at the Austin Convention Center in Austin, Texas. DH Austin featured six North American teams, and two South American teams. They competed for a $100,000 prize pool. In the finals, Luminosity Gaming, the then world champions after winning MLG Columbus 2016, defeated its fellow Brazilian team Tempo Storm, 2–0, to win Dream Hack Open Austin 2016.

== Qualifier ==
Round of 16
Cloud9	2
tNt	0
Team SoloMid	2
KKona	0
NRG Esports	2
Mostly Animosity	0
OpTic Gaming	FF
BOTS	W
Selfless Gaming	2
Booty Clapper	0
Splyce	2
Third Equinox	1
Winterfox	2
Obey Alliance	0
Tempo Storm	2
Later kidz	1

Round of 8
Cloud9	2
Team SoloMid	0
NRG Esports	2
BOTS	0
Selfless Gaming	2
Splyce	1
Winterfox	0
Tempo Storm	2

Qualified
Cloud9	2
NRG Esports	0
Selfless Gaming	2
Tempo Storm	1

–
Cloud9	Q
Selfless Gaming	Q

== Teams ==
- Cloud9
- Counter Logic Gaming
- Luminosity Gaming
- NRG Esports
- Selfless Gaming
- Splyce
- Team Liquid
- Tempo Storm

== Broadcast Talent ==
Desk Host

- Alex "Machine" Richardson

Host

- Sue "Smix" Lee

Commentators

- Joey "heliumbrella" Cunningham
- Mohan "launders" Govindasamy
- John "BLU" Mullen
- Jason "moses" O'Toole

Analysts

- Stephanie "missharvey" Harvey
- Janko "YNk" Paunović

== Groups ==
=== Group A ===
Seed	Team	Record	RF	RA	RD	Points
1	Luminosity Gaming	2-0	32	8	+24	2
2	Cloud9	2-1	66	60	+6	2
3	Counter Logic Gaming	1-2	79	89	-10	1
4	Splyce	0-2	31	51	-20	0

Group A Matches
Luminosity Gaming	1	0	Splyce
Counter Logic Gaming	0	1	Cloud9
Luminosity Gaming	1	0	Cloud9
Counter Logic Gaming	2	0	Splyce
Cloud9	2	1	Counter Logic Gaming

Group A Scores
Team	Score	Map	Score	Team
Luminosity Gaming	16	Train	5	Splyce
Counter Logic Gaming	1	Cobblestone	16	Cloud9
Luminosity Gaming	16	Mirage	3	Cloud9
Counter Logic Gaming	19	Train	16	Splyce
Counter Logic Gaming	16	Dust II	10	Splyce
Counter Logic Gaming	–	Cobblestone	–	Splyce
Cloud9	19	Cache	16	Counter Logic Gaming
Cloud9	12	Mirage	16	Counter Logic Gaming
Cloud9	16	Dust II	11	Counter Logic Gaming

=== Group B ===
Seed	Team	Record	RF	RA	RD	Points
1	Tempo Storm	2-0	32	15	+17	2
2	Team Liquid	2-1	58	39	+19	2
3	Selfless Gaming	1-2	69	88	-19	1
4	NRG Esports	0-2	45	62	-17	0

Group B Matches
Tempo Storm	1	0	NRG Esports
Team Liquid	1	0	Selfless Gaming
Tempo Storm	1	0	Team Liquid
Selfless Gaming	2	1	NRG Esports
Team Liquid	2	0	Selfless Gaming

Group B Scores
Team	Score	Map	Score	Team
Tempo Storm	16	Cache	5	NRG Esports
Team Liquid	16	Mirage	10	Selfless Gaming
Tempo Storm	16	Cobblestone	10	Team Liquid
NRG Esports	16	Overpass	19	Selfless Gaming
NRG Esports	16	Train	11	Selfless Gaming
NRG Esports	8	Cache	16	Selfless Gaming
Team Liquid	16	Dust II	3	Selfless Gaming
Team Liquid	16	Train	10	Selfless Gaming
Team Liquid	–	Mirage	–	Selfless Gaming

== Playoffs ==
Semifinals
A1	Luminosity Gaming	2
B2	Team Liquid	0
B1	Tempo Storm	2
A2	Cloud9	1

Finals
A1	Luminosity Gaming	2
B1	Tempo Storm	0

=== Semifinals Scores ===
Semifinals
Team	Score	Map	Score	Team
Luminosity Gaming	16	Dust II	6	Team Liquid
Luminosity Gaming	16	Dust II	14	Team Liquid
Luminosity Gaming	–	Overpass	–	Team Liquid
Tempo Storm	13	Cobblestone	16	Cloud9
Tempo Storm	19	Inferno	16	Cloud9
Tempo Storm	16	Cache	11	Cloud9

=== Finals Scores ===
Finals
Team	Score	Map	Score	Team
Luminosity Gaming	16	Mirage	9	Tempo Storm
Luminosity Gaming	16	Cobblestone	9	Tempo Storm
Luminosity Gaming		Train		Tempo Storm

== Final standings ==
Final Standings
Place	Prize Money	Team	Roster	Coach
1st	US$50,000	Luminosity Gaming	FalleN, coldzera, fnx, TACO, fer	zews
2nd	US$20,000	Tempo Storm	Boltz, HEN1, LUCAS1, SHOOWTiME, felps	peacemaker
3rd – 4th	US$70,000	Team Liquid	Hiko, EliGE, koosta, nitr0, adreN	jokasteve
3rd – 4th	US$70,000	Cloud9	n0thing, Stewie2k, Skadoodle, Slemmy, shroud	Irukandji
5th – 6th	US$3,000	Selfless Gaming	MAiNLiNE, Relyks, Nifty, mitch, Uber	Ryu
5th – 6th	US$3,000	Counter Logic Gaming	reltuC, hazed, tarik, jdm64, FugLy	pita
7th – 8th	US$2,000	Splyce	arya, fREAKAZOiD, summit1g, DAVEY, jasonR	
7th – 8th	US$2,000	NRG Esports	ptr, just9n, SileNt3m, gob b, LEGIA	
