= Tespa =

North American collegiate esports organization

- Type: Collegiate esports organization
- Industry: Video games Esports
- Founded: September 2, 2013; Austin, Texas, United States
- Founder: Adam Rosen; Tyler Rosen; Chris Kelly
- Headquarters: Irvine, California, United States
- Area served: North America
- Products: Events: Heroes of the Dorm
- Number of employees: ~10 (2015)
- Website: www.tespa.org

Tespa (formerly Texas eSports Association) is a North American collegiate esports organization headquartered in the offices of Blizzard Entertainment in Irvine, California. Founded in 2012 as a collegiate gaming club at the University of Texas, Austin, Tespa expanded nationally in 2013 as an event support network for college gaming organizations. In 2014, the company announced an official partnership with Blizzard Entertainment, hosting online leagues for Hearthstone, League of Legends, StarCraft II, Heroes of the Storm, and Overwatch.

== Early history ==
Tespa was founded in 2012 by classmates Adam Rosen, Tyler Rosen, and Chris Kelly as the Texas eSports Association, an on-campus gaming organization at the University of Texas, Austin. After gaining national attention with its Lone Star Clash tournament series for StarCraft and League of Legends in 2012, Tespa expanded first to other Texas gaming clubs, then nationally to colleges like University of Nevada, Reno and University of California, San Diego in 2013.

== Blizzard partnership ==
In 2013, Tespa announced an official partnership with Blizzard Entertainment to provide licensed StarCraft, Hearthstone and Heroes of the Storm in-game rewards to college gaming clubs. In early 2014, Tespa and Blizzard Entertainment hosted the $5,000 North American Collegiate Hearthstone Open series, culminating in a live grand finals event at the Twitch stage at PAX East and PAX Prime.

== Heroes of the Dorm ==
In early 2015, Tespa and Blizzard Entertainment announced a $450,000 championship series for the unreleased Blizzard game Heroes of the Storm, offering a fully paid tuition for the winning college team. Over 6200 players from 462 schools participated in the online bracket, culminating in a live grand finals event at the Shrine Auditorium in Los Angeles, California. The tournament, named Heroes of the Dorm, was the first esports event ever broadcast live on a national television channel. Heroes of the Dorm generated widespread controversy on Twitter and other social media sites, garnering vocal support and heated criticism from American sports teams, sports personalities, and news networks.

On January 28, 2016, Tespa and Blizzard Entertainment announced a second season of Heroes of the Dorm, offering an increased scholarship prize pool and a return to ESPN's broadcast network.

== Compete Tournament Portal ==
Compete is Tespa's proprietary tournament administration and support service, created in 2014 as the bracketing platform for the North American Collegiate Hearthstone Open. Since its launch, Compete has evolved to support programs ranging from online qualifiers such as Riot's hallmark collegiate program, North American Collegiate Championship, and long-form leagues including the Collegiate Hearthstone Championship.
