= NYChrisG =

American professional esports player

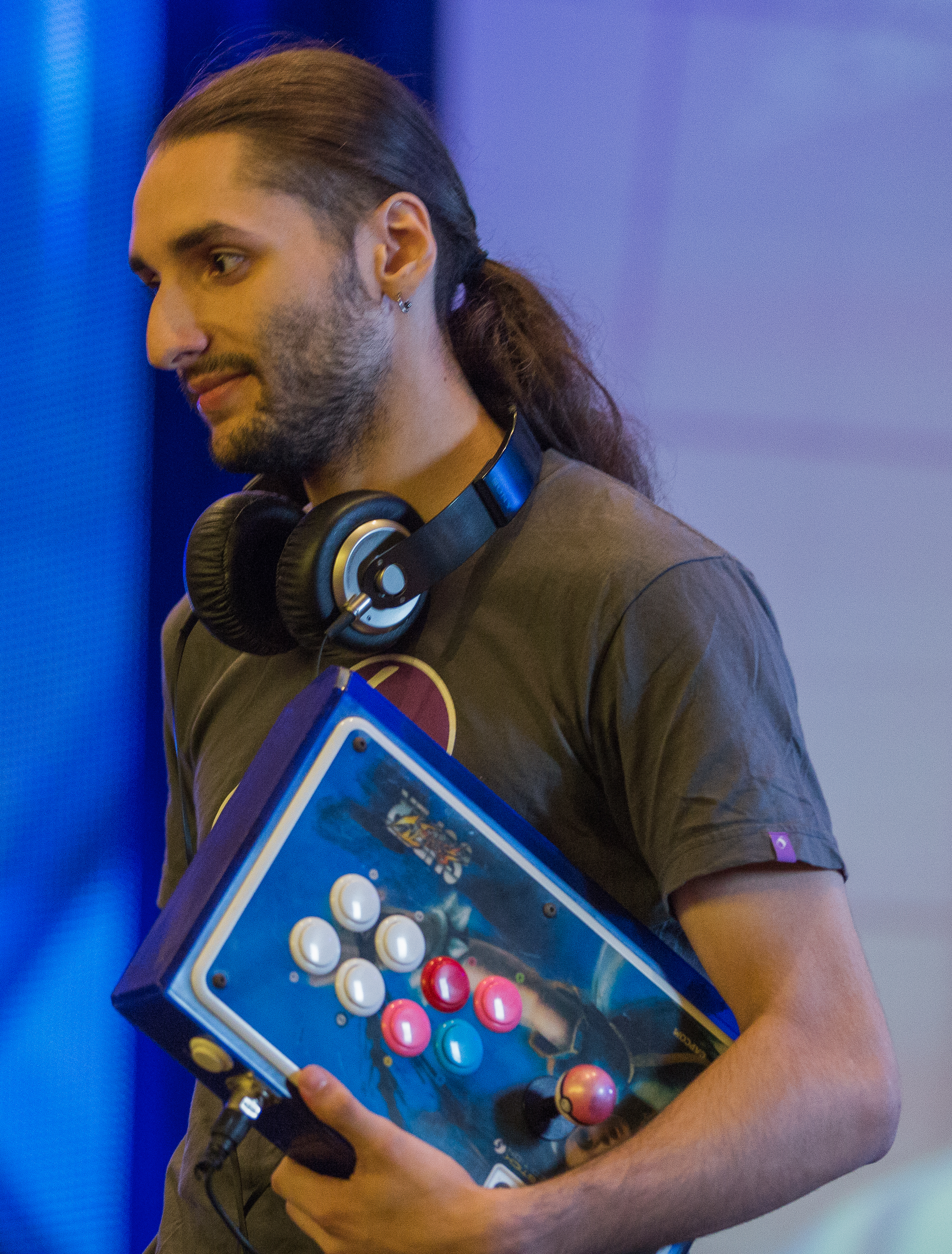
- NYChrisG at EVO 2012

Personal information
- Name: Christopher Gonzalez
- Nationality: American

Career information
- Games: Marvel vs. Capcom series; Mortal Kombat series; Street Fighter series; Skullgirls; Divekick; Injustice: Gods Among Us; Killer Instinct; Pokkén Tournament; Dragon Ball FighterZ
- Playing career: 2011–present

Team history
- 2011–2012: Local Battles
- 2012–2013: FingerCramp
- 2013–2014: AfterGlow Elite
- 2014: GamesterGear
- 2015–2016: Tempo Storm
- 2017–2020: Evil Geniuses

Christopher Gonzalez, also known as NYChrisG, is an American competitive gamer, specializing in fighting games. He is considered one of the top Ultimate Marvel vs. Capcom 3 players. He is also the Evo 2016 champion for Ultimate Marvel vs. Capcom 3.

== Career ==
=== 2011 ===
Gonzalez was first sponsored by the Local Battles Gaming Center in Fort Lee, New Jersey. Gonzalez first came to prominence at CEO 2011 and got 3rd place in Marvel vs. Capcom 3, losing only to Justin Wong and Hajime "Tokido" Taniguchi. Gonzalez would later attend EVO 2011 and defeat Noah Solis using a team of Amaterasu, Ryu, and Albert Wesker. Gonzalez also placed Top 8 in Mortal Kombat during that event, getting 4th place using Reptile. He was knocked into losers by Eric "JOP" Akins, and then eliminated by Giuseppe "REO" Grosso. Gonzalez also represented the East Coast in the East Coast vs. West Coast Marvel vs. Capcom 3 exhibition in which his team lost.

=== 2012 ===
Gonzalez made a name for himself in Ultimate Marvel vs. Capcom 3 by using a team consisting of Morrigan, Doctor Doom, and Akuma. In March 2012, Gonzalez left Local Battles and joined FingerCramp. At EVO 2012, Gonzalez made the Top 8, where he defeated Justin Wong, Job "Flocker" Figueroa, and Peter "Combofiend" Rosas. He was ultimately defeated by Ryan "Filipino Champ" Ramirez, finishing 3rd. Gonzalez would later go on to substitute Akuma for Vergil on his main team. In October, Gonzalez left FingerCramp and joined AfterGlow Elite.

=== 2013 ===
Gonzalez attended CEO 2013 and won the Injustice: Gods Among Us and UMvC3 tournaments. Gonzalez made Top 8 in Injustice: Gods Among Us and Ultimate Marvel vs. Capcom 3 at Evolution 2013. Gonzalez received 3rd place in Injustice: Gods Among Us using Green Arrow. He was defeated by Denzell "Crazy DJT 88" Terry twice, once in the Winners Bracket and once in the Losers Bracket. Gonzalez also lost to Justin Wong in the Ultimate Marvel vs. Capcom 3 tournament, finishing tied for 5th. Gonzalez later attended Capcom Cup, qualifying for the Super Street Fighter IV: Arcade Edition v2012 tournament and being voted into the Ultimate Marvel vs. Capcom 3 tournament. Gonzalez defeated Michael "IFC Yipes" Mendoza in the Grand Finals in order to receive the trophy. Gonzalez would later defeat EVO 2013 champion Job "Flocker" Figueroa in a first-to-5 exhibition. Gonzalez got 7th place in the Street Fighter tournament, being knocked into losers by Naoto "Sakonoko" Sako and then being eliminated by Hajime "Tokido" Taniguchi.

=== 2014 ===
Gonzalez was released from AfterGlow Elite as it was disbanded. Gonzalez moved from his hometown of New York City to Los Angeles, California. There he was sponsored by GamesterGear for Final Round XVII. Gonzalez would permanently be part of the team later on. Gonzalez plans to continue using Sakura in Ultra Street Fighter IV, and will be using Yang, Evil Ryu, and Elena as alternates. Gonzalez attended CEO 2014 and won the Ultimate Marvel vs. Capcom 3 Tournament, although he was unable to defend his title in Injustice: Gods Among Us being defeated by ForeverKing and DEG. Gonzalez has competed at EVO 2014, most notably receiving 2nd place in Ultimate Marvel vs. Capcom 3, losing to six-time Marvel vs. Capcom 2 champion Justin Wong. Also notable was Gonzalez failing to make the Top 8 for Injustice: Gods Among Us receiving 13th place. In late October, Gonzalez announced his departure from GamesterGear. After not showing up at a major tournament in three months, Gonzalez made a return to the scene by entering NEC 15, placing Top 8 in Ultimate Marvel vs. Capcom 3, Mortal Kombat (2011), and Ultra Street Fighter IV. Also notable at the tournament was Gonzalez receiving first place in the Ultimate Marvel vs. Capcom 3 based tournament Curleh Mustache Battle Royale 4 which took place at the same time as NEC 15.

=== 2015 ===
On March 10, Gonzalez was picked up by Tempo Storm as their first player in their Fighting Games division. On April 2, it was revealed that Gonzalez would be featured on Cross Counter's hit show "The Excellent Adventures of Gootecks and Mike Ross" for four episodes. In June, fellow Ultimate Marvel vs. Capcom 3 god Justin Wong placed a $300 bounty on Gonzalez, Wong himself, and Ryan "Filipino Champ" Ramirez for eliminating them in the Ultimate Marvel vs. Capcom 3 tournament at EVO 2015. Gonzalez earned $300 for eliminating fellow god Justin Wong from said tournament, but was eliminated by Japanese player Ryota "RF" Fukumoto in a mirror match to get into Top 8.

=== 2016 ===
On March 2, Gonzalez was released from Tempo Storm as his contract expired. At Evo 2016, Gonzalez won the Ultimate Marvel vs. Capcom 3 tournament out of the loser's bracket.

Gonzalez has picked up Street Fighter V and mainly plays Guile in said game. Prior to Guile being released in late April he played Cammy and Nash.

=== 2017 ===
On January 1, 2017, Gonzalez was signed by Evil Geniuses.

=== 2020 ===
On June 23, 2020, Gonzalez was released by Evil Geniuses for comments he made on Facebook in 2017.

== Notable tournament placings ==
Marvel vs. Capcom 3 Results

Year	Tournament	Placement
2011	CEO - Community Effort Orlando 2011	3rd

Mortal Kombat 9 Tournament Results

Year	Tournament	Placement
2011	CEO - Community Effort Orlando 2011	1st
2011	Evolution 2011	4th
2012	PowerUp 2012	2nd
2012	Civil War 4	4th
2013	Texas Showdown 2013	3rd
2014	Northeast Championships XV 2014	3rd

Ultimate Marvel vs. Capcom 3 Tournament Results

Year	Tournament	Placement
2012	Apex 2012	5th
2012	Winter Brawl 6	2nd
2012	Final Round XV	5th
2012	Ultimate Fighting Game Tournament 8	1st
2012	PowerUp 2012	1st
2012	Civil War 4	1st
2012	East Coast Throwdown 4	5th
2012	CEO - Community Effort Orlando 2012	2nd
2012	Evolution 2012	3rd
2012	GVN Summer Jam 6	2nd
2012	Seasons Beatings: Ascension	1st
2012	Curleh Mustache 5	1st
2012	Northeast Championships 13	1st
2013	Apex 2013	1st
2013	SoCal Regionals 2013	2nd
2013	Winter Brawl 7	1st
2013	Red Fight District 2	1st
2013	Final Round 16	1st
2013	Texas Showdown 2013	1st
2013	Civil War V	1st
2013	NorCal Regionals 11	1st
2013	East Coast Throwdown V	2nd
2013	Ultimate Fighting Game Tournament 9	1st
2013	CEO - Community Effort Orlando 2013	1st
2013	Evolution 2013	5th
2013	Video X Games 2013	2nd
2013	GVN Summer Jam VII	1st
2013	The Fall Classic 2013	1st
2013	Canada Cup 2013	2nd
2013	ColiseoVS 2	1st
2013	Youmacon 2013	1st
2013	Northeast Championships XIV	1st
2013	Capcom Cup 2013	1st
2013	Hadocon V	2nd
2014	Defend the North 2014	1st
2014	Apex 2014	5th
2014	Kumite in Tennessee 2014	1st
2014	Final Round XVII	1st
2014	Texas Showdown 2014	1st
2014	East Coast Throwdown 2014	1st
2014	Ultimate Fighting Game Tournament 10	3rd
2014	Community Effort Orlando 2014	1st
2014	Evolution 2014	2nd
2014	First Attack 2014	2nd
2014	Northeast Championships XV	3rd
2015	NorCal Regionals 2015	2nd
2015	Northwest Majors 7	5th
2015	Texas Showdown 2015	1st
2015	SoCal Regionals 2015: Prelude I	2nd
2015	CEO - Community Effort Orlando 2015	3rd
2015	Curleh Mustache West 4	1st
2015	Evolution 2015	9th
2015	Summer Jam 9	1st
2015	First Attack 2015	1st
2015	The Fall Classic 2015	1st
2016	Kumite in Tennessee 2016	1st
2016	Final Round 19	2nd
2016	NorCal Regionals 2016	1st
2016	West Coast Warzone 5	2nd
2016	Texas Showdown 2016	1st
2016	Evolution 2016	1st
2017	Curleh Finale	1st

Super Street Fighter IV: Arcade Edition v2012 Tournament Results

Year	Tournament	Placement
2012	Apex 2012	2nd
2012	Winter Brawl 6	5th
2012	Civil War 4	5th
2012	GVN Summer Jam 6	4th
2013	Apex 2013	4th
2013	Red Fight District 2	5th
2013	Texas Showdown 2013	3rd
2013	Civil War V	1st
2013	NorCal Regionals 11	3rd
2013	East Coast Throwdown V	4th
2013	Ultimate Fighting Game Tournament 9	7th
2013	CEO - Community Effort Orlando 2013	3rd
2013	Video X Games 2013	4th
2013	GVN Summer Jam VII	2nd
2013	The Fall Classic 2013	1st
2013	ColiseoVS 2	1st
2013	Youmacon 2013	4th
2013	Northeast Championships XIV	3rd
2013	Capcom Cup 2013	7th
2013	Hadocon V	2nd
2014	Defend the North 2014	5th
2014	Kumite in Tennessee 2014	7th

King of Fighters XIII Tournament Results

Year	Tournament	Placement
2012	Winter Brawl 6	2nd
2012	Final Round XV	4th
2012	NorCal Regionals 10	3rd
2012	PowerUp 2012	2nd
2012	Civil War 4	2nd
2013	Apex 2013	2nd
2013	Texas Showdown 2013	4th
2013	Civil War V	2nd
2013	Video X Games 2013	3rd
2013	GVN Summer Jam VII	2nd
2013	The Fall Classic 2013	2nd
2014	Defend the North 2014	2nd
2014	Apex 2014	3rd
2014	GVN Summer Jam VIII	1st
2015	NorCal Regionals 2015	2nd
2015	Summer Jam 9	2nd
2015	The Fall Classic 2015	1st
2015	Northeast Championships 16	2nd

Street Fighter X Tekken Tournament Results

Year	Tournament	Placement
2012	NorCal Regionals 10	2nd
2012	PowerUp 2012	3rd
2012	Civil War 4	1st
2013	Winter Brawl 7	3rd
2013	Ultimate Fighting Game Tournament 9	1st
2013	GVN Summer Jam VII	2nd

Street Fighter III: 3rd Strike Online Edition Tournament Results

Year	Tournament	Placement
2012	Final Round XV	2nd
2012	Ultimate Fighting Game Tournament 8	3rd
2015	NorCal Regionals 2015	2nd
2015	Texas Showdown 2015	2nd
2015	Summer Jam 9	3rd
2016	Texas Showdown 2016	1st

Skullgirls Tournament Results

Year	Tournament	Placement
2012	Ultimate Fighting Game Tournament 8	3rd
2012	Civil War 4	1st
2012	CEO - Community Effort Orlando 2012	1st
2012	Season's Beatings: Ascension	3rd
2013	SoCal Regionals 2013	3rd
2013	Ultimate Fighting Game Tournament 9	4th

Divekick Tournament Results

Year	Tournament	Placement
2013	Ultimate Fighting Game Tournament 9	2nd
2013	CEO - Community Effort Orlando 2013	4th

Injustice Tournament Results

Year	Tournament	Placement
2013	Civil War V	3rd
2013	East Coast Throwdown V	3rd
2013	Ultimate Fighting Game Tournament 9	1st
2013	CEO - Community Effort Orlando 2013	1st
2013	Evolution 2013	3rd
2013	Video X Games 2013	2nd
2013	GVN Summer Jam VII	3rd
2013	Canada Cup 2013	4th
2013	Youmacon 2013	4th
2014	Community Effort Orlando 2014	4th

Killer Instinct (2013) Tournament Results

Year	Tournament	Placement
2014	Kumite in Tennessee 2014	3rd
2014	SoCal Regionals 2014	2nd
2014	East Coast Throwdown 2014	4th

Ultra Street Fighter IV Tournament Results

Year	Tournament	Placement
2014	Ultimate Fighting Game Tournament 10	4th
2014	Community Effort Orlando 2014	7th
2014	Capcom Pro Tour San Diego Comic-Con	3rd
2014	First Attack 2014	1st
2014	GVN Summer Jam VIII	5th
2014	Northeast Championships XV	5th
2015	Northwest Majors 7	5th
2015	Texas Showdown 2015	5th
2015	SoCal Regionals 2015: Prelude I	4th
2015	First Attack 2015	5th
2016	NorCal Regionals 2016	5th
2016	Texas Showdown 2016	1st

Mortal Kombat X Results

Year	Tournament	Placement
2015	Northwest Majors 7	5th
2015	Texas Showdown 2015	2nd
2015	SoCal Regionals 2015: Prelude I	2nd

Street Fighter V Results

Year	Tournament	Placement
2016	West Coast Warzone 5	7th

Pokkén Tournament Results

Year	Tournament	Placement
2016	Texas Showdown 2016	2nd

Dragon Ball FighterZ Results

Year	Tournament	Placement
2018	Winter Brawl 12	2nd
2018	Texas Showdown 2018	1st
