= Trump (gamer) =

American professional esports player

Personal information
- Name: Jeffrey Shih
- Born: June 28, 1987 (age 39); Bay Area, California, U.S.
- Nationality: Taiwanese American

Career information
- Games: Hearthstone; StarCraft II; Age of Empires 4
- Playing career: 2013–2018

Team history
- 2013–2014: Team Razer
- 2014–2017: Team SoloMid
- 2017–2018: Tempo Storm

Jeffrey Shih (Chinese: 石謙和; pinyin: Shí Qiānhé; Wade–Giles: Shih² Ch'ien-he² born June 28, 1987), also known by his username Trump or TrumpSC, is a Taiwanese American professional video game player who streams Hearthstone, Age of Empires 4, and previously Starcraft II.

Prior to joining Team SoloMid in 2014, Shih established a Hearthstone channel on Twitch with a significant viewership and competed at a high level within the North America' region.

He formerly played StarCraft II for the Team Legion and Vega Squadron groups.

== Career ==
Shih graduated from New York University with a bachelor's degree in management and finance in 2009. Around that time he began working at a bank and streaming himself playing Starcraft II in his free time, averaging a few thousand concurrent viewers a stream. Shih's main intention behind his nickname Trump was to use the verb form of the word "trump", meaning "supersede".

Eventually Shih decided to quit his job and began streaming full-time, making a living from Twitch's partnership program by earning revenue from advertisements and subscriptions. He later began playing and streaming Hearthstone starting in the game's beta phase.

Shih has been described as "the world's most famous Hearthstone player", attracting over 20,000 concurrent viewers on his stream. In 2014, Shih streamed for seven hours per day. On October 13, 2013, he was signed by Team Razer as the world's first professional Hearthstone player.

In the Blizzard 2013 Stream Awards, Shih won the "Most Educational Stream" category with 43% of the vote, and came second in the "Favorite Hearthstone Stream" category. Shih also won "Most Educational Hearthstone Stream" in the Blizzard 2014 Stream Awards. Shih's Hearthstone decks are often used as examples for new players. Blizzard Entertainment, creators of Hearthstone, cited streamers like Shih as reasons they were happy to continue with the game's monetization model after he reached the game's highest ranks without spending any money.

In July 2014 Shih joined Team SoloMid. He left Team SoloMid in March 2017 and signed to Tempo Storm as a player and content creator for the team. Tempo Storm parted ways with Shih in October 2018.

== Tournament results ==
- 7-8th — 2015 Hearthstone World Championship - Americas Championship

== Personal life ==
Shih was born on June 28, 1987, in South Bay of the San Francisco Bay Area. He is an only child. He attended New York University's Stern School of Business from 2005 to 2009. Shih lived in the San Francisco Bay Area until June 2016, when he moved to Austin, Texas.
