= Kripparrian =

Romanian-Canadian Twitch streamer

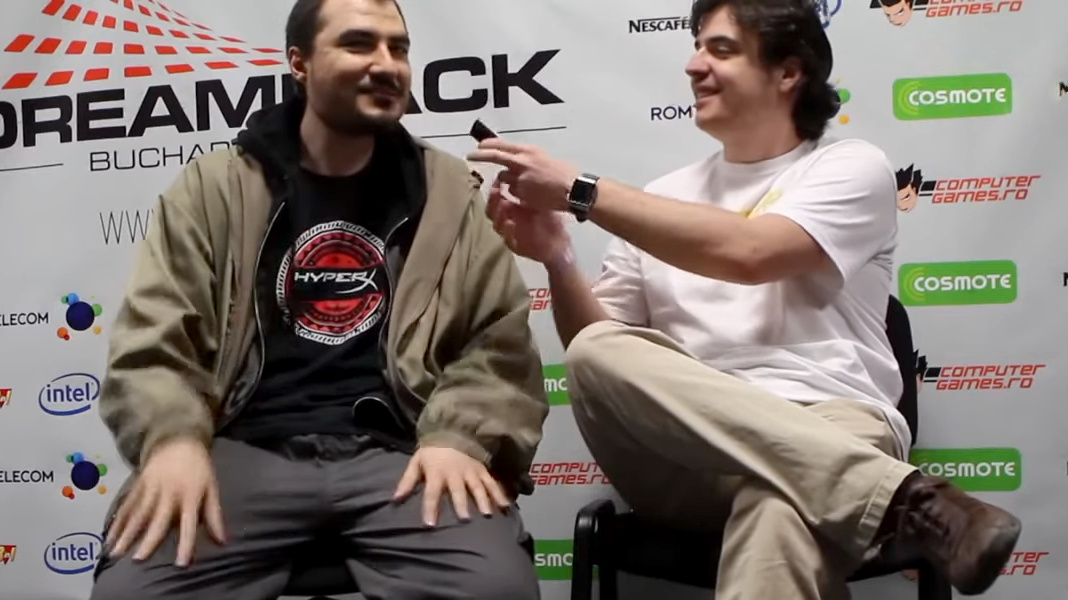
- Morosan (left) in an interview at DreamHack Bucharest 2015
- Born: Octavian Morosan; 30 June 1987 (age 39); Suceava, Romania
- Other name: Kripp
- Occupations: Twitch streamer; YouTuber; video game personality
- Spouse: Rania Morosan (m. 2014)

Twitch information
- Channel: nl_kripp
- Years active: 2012–present
- Genre: Gaming
- Games: Hearthstone; Diablo III; World of Warcraft; Path of Exile
- Followers: 1.5 million

YouTube information
- Channel: Kripparrian
- Genre: Gaming
- Subscribers: 903 thousand
- Views: 1.1 billion
- Last updated: August 1, 2024

Octavian Morosan (born June 30, 1987) better known by his online username Kripparrian, is a Romanian-Canadian Twitch streamer, YouTuber and video game personality. He is known for his achievements on Diablo III, World of Warcraft, and Hearthstone, as well as winning the "Favorite Hearthstone Stream" and Most "Engaged" Viewers categories, and coming second in the "Highest Stream View Average" category at the Blizzard Stream Awards in 2014. In June 2017 he achieved over one million followers on Twitch and as of October 2024, he has over 1.5 million followers.

== Achievements ==
=== World of Warcraft ===
Morosan was a World of Warcraft player before beginning his streaming career, recognized for being the first person to complete the Ironman Challenge, being in a leading US raiding guild, Exodus, as well as being a competitor of top Hunter DPS parses during that time. In mid-2010, Morosan had the highest damage per second benchmarks for the Hunter class in the game.

=== Diablo III ===
Morosan became the first person, along with his friend Krippi, to complete the Diablo III video game on "Inferno" difficulty (the highest difficulty in the game at that time), just over a month after it was launched. The achievement was done before patch 1.0.3, which made the game easier, and both players used "Hardcore" characters in the feat, which are lost forever when the characters are killed in the game.

=== Hearthstone ===
Morosan is the second most popular Hearthstone streamer of all time. He competed in the Innkeeper's Invitational Hearthstone tournament at BlizzCon 2013. He has achieved "Legend rank", the highest ranking in the game's ladder system, which he reached in August 2015. However, Morosan is more known as an Arena, and more recently, Battlegrounds, player, where he is able to achieve high victory streaks despite having drafted poor cards. He is noted for his fun and innovative Hearthstone decks and spearheaded efforts, along with his wife, Rania, towards making Challengestone, a Hearthstone deckbuilding competition. GamesRadar listed Morosan Twitch channel as one players should watch.

Morosan, AmazHS, and Frodan commentated the Hearthstone World Championship at Blizzcon 2015.

Morosan's streams garner 50,512 viewers on average. In January 2017 and September 2018, he achieved first place in the first monthly "Top 100" leaderboard for North America players in the "Arena" game mode.

== Personal life ==
Before his streaming career, Morosan worked as a computer technician after dropping out of college, where he was studying physics and mathematics.

He is married to Rania Morosan (underflowR), who works as his manager and YouTube editor, as well as maintaining a YouTube channel with clips from the couple's life. They were married on October 31, 2014.

Morosan lived in Athens, Greece for a year and a half with his wife. They currently reside in Canada, in a house they designed and built themselves. The couple have two dogs, a German Shepherd named Dexter and a Corgi named Fey.

Morosan is a vegan.
