= Liooon =

Chinese esports player

Personal information
- Name: 李晓萌 (Li Xiaomeng)
- Nationality: Chinese

Current team
- Team: Victory Key
- Game: Hearthstone

Team history
- 2019–present: Victory Key

Career highlights and awards
- Hearthstone World Champion (2019)

Li Xiaomeng (Chinese: 李晓萌), better known by her in-game name Liooon, is a Chinese professional Hearthstone player. She is the first woman to win the Hearthstone Grandmasters Global Finals and to win a BlizzCon Esports tournament.

On November 2, 2019, representing China in Hearthstone Global Finals, she defeated Bloodyface (Luna Eason, representing United States) to become the Hearthstone Global champion, claiming a prize of $200,000 (USD). She was the first woman to win a BlizzCon Global Championship, and the first Hearthstone Global Champion from mainland China since the start of tournaments in 2014.

In an interview after winning the championship, she shared a story that more than two years ago, she went to her first Hearthstone tournament as a backup for the game. While waiting in line, she was mocked by a male player, who said that: "If you are a girl, you should not wait in line here. It's not for you." She then gave a sentimental speech for women in Esports: "I want to say for all the girls out there who have a dream for Esports competition, for glory, if you want to do it and you believe in yourself, you should just forget your gender and go for it."

Her Battle.net name "VKLiooon" is composed of the name of her team, "VK", and a deliberately misspelling of Lion.
