= Pavel Beltiukov =

Russian esports player

Pavel
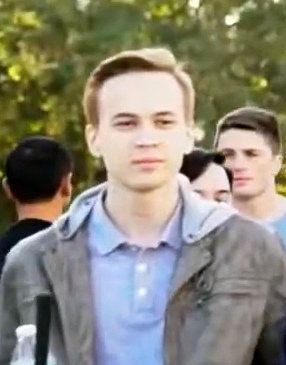
- Beltiukov in 2018

Personal information
- Name: Pavel Beltiukov
- Born: 1998 or 1999 (age 27–28)
- Nationality: Russian

Career information
- Game: Hearthstone
- Playing career: 2015–present

Pavel Beltiukov (Russian: Павел Бельтюков), also known as Pavel Beltukov, or simply Pavel, is a Russian professional esports player who is ranked 2nd in tournament rankings for Hearthstone as of May 2018.

Beltiukov began his Hearthstone career in 2015. In 2016, Beltiukov won the BlizzCon Hearthstone tournament earning $250,000 and gained the title of Hearthstone World Champion. Beltiukov won the first event in the 2017 Hearthstone Championship Tour defeating James "Greensheep" Luo.

As of 2017, Beltiukov is the highest earning Hearthstone player in tournament winnings amassing over $275,000.

== Biography ==
Pavel Beltyukov was born on the 7th of January 1998 in Yekaterinburg. He did not serve in the army, after graduating from school he fully devoted himself to cybersport.

He started playing Hearthstone while still in the closed beta stage, and in June 2014 he took part in competitions for the first time. At first, he played once a week at Gosu Cup tournaments, although he didn't show any outstanding results here, he was just getting to know the game and gaining experience.

He achieved his first real serious success in spring 2015, when he qualified for the Gfinity 2015 Spring Masters II (in the end, he did not play at this event, as he was unable to obtain an English visa in time). In August, he qualified for the first live tournament of his career, One Nation of Gamers Summer Circuit - he made it through the group stage, but lost to Ukraine's Oleksandr ‘Kolento’ Malsh at the semi-final stage - for this achievement he was awarded a $3,000 prize. Two months later, he became one of the eight strongest players in Europe and qualified for the BlizzCon World Championship.

In February 2016, Beltyukov won the second season of the Hearthstone Champions League, made it out of the group at DreamHack Austin 2016, made an appearance at WCA 2016, and was the best at the European qualifier Last Call.

One of the most significant victories in his professional career came in autumn 2016 at the BlizzCon World Championship, the most prestigious tournament in the Hearthstone discipline. He lost 1:4 to American HotMEOWTH in the group stage, but then won 4:0 against Korean DDaHyoNi and 4:3 against Chinese OmegaZero to advance to the quarter-final stage. At the play-off stage he won a hard fought 4:3 victory over William ‘Amnesiac’ Barton of the USA, followed by a 4:2 win over JasonZhou of China and a 4:2 win over Artem ‘DrHippi’ Kravets of Ukraine in the decisive final match. Having won the world title, he received the main prize of $250,000.
