= Women in Games =

Women in Games, formally Women in Games WIGJ is a UK-based community interest company which aims to recruit more women into the video gaming industry and to protect the interests of women in the industry. It was founded in 2009 and originally known as Women in Games Jobs (WIGJ); the initials are still part of its legal name. The company's CEO is Marie Claire Isaaman.

The company began a mentoring program in 2015 to support women joining the games industry. In 2018 it was announced that Facebook would be partnering with Women in Games WIGJ in its Women in Gaming Initiative, "dedicated to encouraging more women to join the games industry".

Women in Games WIGJ run an annual conference - Women in Games European Conference - in addition to an annual awards ceremony. There was controversy when in 2018 WIGJ awarded its "Best presenter" esports award to a man, James Banks.

The award categories that exist are the following; For a public vote there are: Favourite Woman Game Protagonist, Best Representation Of Women In A Video Game; For impact there are: Community Group making an impact in Diversity, Individual Diversity Advocate, Most Inclusive Esports Initiative, Most Inclusive Video Games Initiative, Amplifier of Diversity in the Industry – Media; For education there are: Games or Esports Diversity Initiative, Student Achievement, Games or Esports Educator; For Women in Games Community Award there are: Outstanding Corporate Ambassador of the Year, Outstanding Individual Ambassador of the Year; There is also a Lifetime Achievement award.

== See also ==
- Women and video games
