= Hearthstone =

2014 online collectible card game

- Developer: Blizzard Entertainment
- Publisher: Blizzard Entertainment
- Directors: Ben Brode (Note: Until early 2018); Jason Chayes (Note: Until October 28, 2019 or before); Eric Dodds (Note: Until October 28, 2019 or before)
- Designers: Derek Sakamoto (Note: Until November 2022 or before); Mike Donais (Note: Until 2020)
- Composer: Peter McConnell
- Series: Warcraft
- Engine: Unity
- Platforms: Windows; macOS; iOS; Android
- Release: Windows, macOS; March 11, 2014; iOS, Android; April 16, 2015
- Genre: Digital collectible card game
- Modes: Single-player, multiplayer

Hearthstone is a 2014 free-to-play digital collectible card video game produced by Blizzard Entertainment. Originally subtitled Heroes of Warcraft, Hearthstone builds upon the existing lore of the Warcraft series by using the same elements, characters, and relics. The game is available on the Windows, macOS, iOS and Android platforms, featuring cross-platform play. It has been a critical and commercial success, with Blizzard reporting more than 100 million Hearthstone players as of November 2018, and the game has become popular as an esport, with cash prize tournaments hosted by Blizzard and other organizers.

The game is a turn-based card game between two opponents, using constructed decks of 30 cards along with a selected hero with a unique power. Players use their limited mana crystals to play abilities or summon minions to attack the opponent, with the goal of destroying the opponent's hero. Winning matches and completing quests earn in-game gold, rewards in the form of new cards, and other in-game prizes. Players can then buy packs of new cards through gold or microtransactions to customize and improve their decks. The game features several modes of play, including casual and ranked matches, drafted arena battles, and single-player adventures. New content for the game involves the addition of new card sets and gameplay, taking the form of expansion packs.

In contrast to other games developed by Blizzard, Hearthstone was an experimental game developed by a smaller team based on the appreciation of collectible card games at the company. The game was designed to avoid the pitfalls of other digital collectible card games by eliminating any possible plays from an opponent during a player's turn and by replicating the feel of a physical card game within the game's user interface. Many of the concepts as well as art assets were based on those previously published in the physical World of Warcraft Trading Card Game.

== Gameplay ==
An example of gameplay in Hearthstone. Players use cards from their hands, such as minions and spells, to interact with the game board.

Set within the Warcraft universe, Hearthstone is a digital-only, turn-based collectible card game which pits two opponents against each other. Players select a hero from one of eleven classes. All classes have unique cards and abilities, known as hero powers, which help define class archetypes. Each player uses a deck of cards from their collection with the end goal being to reduce the opponent's health to zero.

There are five different types of cards: minions, spells, weapons, hero cards and locations. These cards are ordered by rarity, with Legendary cards being the rarest, followed by Epic, Rare, Common, and Free. Blizzard releases expansions of additional cards every four months, as well as smaller mini-sets between expansions, to increase the variety in the metagame. The game uses a freemium model of revenue, meaning players can play for free or pay to acquire additional card packs or content.

Unlike other card games such as Magic: The Gathering, Hearthstone was designed to speed up play by eliminating any manual reactions from the opposing player during a player's turn, and setting a timer for each player's turn. During a turn, players play cards from their hand using "mana", a budget each player must abide by which increases by one each turn with a maximum of ten, and with cards having various mana costs. This invokes strategy as the player must plan ahead, taking into account what cards can and cannot be played.

Most playable cards can be classed as minions or as spells. Minions will be placed directly onto the board after being played and may carry special effects like Charge or Deathrattle, allowing the minion to attack instantly or making the minion do something special upon death, respectively. Spells have distinctive effects and affect the board in various ways.

Cards can be obtained through opening card packs or by crafting them with arcane dust, earned from destroying unwanted cards or earned in the Arena.

=== Game modes ===
The normal gameplay mode is one-on-one matches between a player and a randomly selected human opponent. Within this, the Standard format uses prepared decks limited to cards from the Core set alongside the expansions from the last two years. A separate Wild format allows all past and present cards to be used subject to deck construction rules. A third format, Twist, is a regularly adjusted format where each season can include curated card pools and special rulesets. All formats are divided into Casual and Ranked modes. Players can climb the tiered ranking system in Ranked, while Casual allows for a more relaxed play-style. At the end of each month, the Ranked season ends, rewarding players with in-game items depending on their performance.

Other more specialized multiplayer modes include the following:

- Arena has the player draft a deck of thirty cards from choices of three cards over several rounds. Players continue to use this deck against other Arena decks until they win or loses a number of matches, after which the deck is retired and players gain in-game rewards based on their record.
- Tavern Brawls are challenges that change weekly and may impose unusual deck-building guidelines.
- Battlegrounds, introduced in November 2019, is based on the auto battler genre, allowing eight players to compete in each match by recruiting minions over several rounds. Players are paired off randomly in each round, with combat between minions played out automatically, with the goal of having minions remaining to damage the opponent's hero, and ultimately be the last hero standing. The top four heroes place and earn a win and increase rating points.
- Mercenaries, introduced in October 2021, is focused on a party-based combat system with roguelike mechanics. A player creates a party from six minions from a central Minion Village and uses that party to complete various quests, both as player-versus-environment and player-versus-player. Battles in this model use a color-coded system similar to rock paper scissors where minions of one color are strong against another color but weak to the third color. Players use this system and minion abilities to try to win battles. With loot gained from combat success, players can use facilities in the Minion Village to improve the attributes and abilities of individual minions or recruit new minions. Blizzard announced that Mercenaries would no longer receive content updates from the 7th of April, 2023, however it is still accessible in the game and receives occasional bug fixes and balance updates.

Some multiplayer modes have been removed from the game since their release:

- Classic mode was available from March 25, 2021, until its removal on June 27, 2023, when it was replaced with the Twist format. It used a mirror of the player's library of all cards that were in the game as of the June 2014 release of the game, reverting any updates or changes to these cards in the interim, effectively representing the game's start at the time of its release.
- Duels was available from October 22, 2020, until its removal on April 16, 2024. It was a multiplayer version of Hearthstone's singleplayer "Dungeon Run" game mode. Players would select one of several playable heroes unique to the mode, choose one of that hero's three hero powers and six uncollectable 'signature' cards, then assemble a 15-card deck, and (like Arena) battle other players until they win or lose a number of matches, after which the deck would be retired and players would gain in-game rewards based on their record. After each match, the player would choose between three 'buckets' of three cards each, a 'passive' effect that would alter the rest of the run, or a treasure card to add to their deck. Unlike Arena, there was also a casual mode that required no entry fee.

In addition to these multiplayer modes, there are solo adventures. These adventures offer alternative ways to play and are designed specifically to challenge the player.

=== Expansions and Adventures ===
Hearthstone's collection interface displaying cards for the Mage class

As a collectable card game, Hearthstone has been expanded with the combination of Expansions and Adventures in addition to the core card set. Initially, Blizzard introduced an alternating series of Expansions and Adventures, with roughly three new sets released each year. Expansions are new card sets, containing between 100 and 200 new cards, that become available to buy or win, as well as introducing new mechanics to the gameplay. Adventures featured smaller number of cards, around 30, which could only be earned by completing multiple tiers of story-based challenges and boss fights in single-player mode. However, by 2017, Blizzard moved to exclusively Expansions, as cards from the Adventure series were readily used in gameplay. Starting in 2021, smaller mini-sets were released among the three yearly expansions, each set featuring a few dozen cards centered around a specific theme as a replacement for Adventures.

To avoid power creep with the large number of cards, Blizzard adopted a "Year" moniker in 2018 to identify when expansions rotate and retire from Standard format, such that only cards from the current and previous year may be used for Standard format, while Wild allows all cards to be used. Since 2021, Blizzard has also modified the Core card set to rotate out older cards and bring new cards from expansions.

== Development ==
=== Conception ===
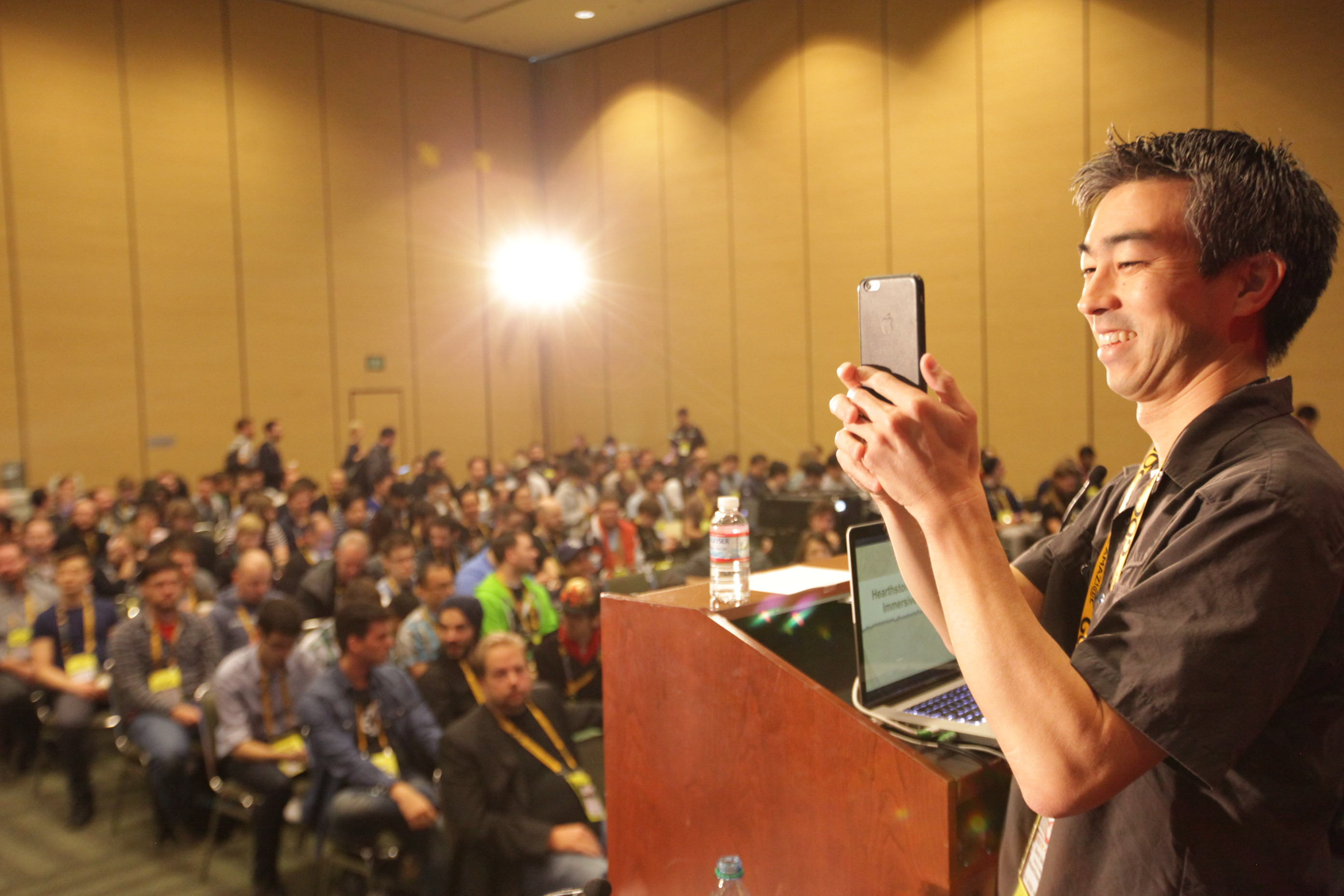
Hearthstone interface designer Derek Sakamoto presents at GDC 2015.

Hearthstone was developed by Blizzard Team 5 and published by Blizzard Entertainment. The development of the game was inspired by two directions, according to developer Eric Dodds: a desire for Blizzard to develop something more experimental with a smaller team in contrast to their larger projects, and the shared love of collectible card games throughout the company.

Blizzard executives, around 2008, had considered that their revenue was primarily sustained on three well-established properties (the Warcraft, StarCraft, and Diablo series), but saw the rise of small independent developers with highly successful projects, representing a shift in the traditional video game model. To explore this new direction, Blizzard brought a number of people into "Team 5", named after being the fifth development team formed at Blizzard. Initially, the team had between 12 and 15 members, in contrast to other Blizzard games with teams in excess of 60 members. By November 2015, the team had 47 members.

Of the game types they explored, Team 5 soon focused on the collectible card game approach, given that many on the team and in Blizzard had played such games since their introduction. The team found it natural to build the card game around the existing Warcraft lore; according to production director Jason Chayes, Warcraft was already a well-known property, and the depth of characters and locations created for other games in that series made it easy to create cards inspired by those. They also saw that new players to Warcraft may be drawn into the other games through playing Hearthstone.

The team was able to pull concepts and art from the pre-existing World of Warcraft Trading Card Game, first published in 2006 by Upper Deck and later by Cryptozoic Entertainment; when Hearthstone was near completion, in 2013, Blizzard terminated its license with Cryptozoic as to favor their pending digital card game. The addition of heroes, an aspect from the previous trading card game, was found to help personalize the game for the player to allow players to discover useful combinations of cards for each hero.

=== Game design and programming ===
After about a year of starting development, the team had produced an Adobe Flash prototype of the game that offered the core card game mechanics and the unique heroes. At this point, several on Team 5 were temporarily moved into other teams to complete the release of StarCraft II: Wings of Liberty. This 10-to-11 month period was considered fortuitous by the team, according to Chayes. Principal designers Dodds and Ben Brode remained developing Hearthstone, and the two were able to quickly iterate many ideas using both the prototype and physical replicas to fine-tune the game mechanics. Secondly, those that were put on StarCraft II came back with ideas based on StarCraft's asymmetric gameplay to help balance the various heroes while still creating a unique characterization and play-style for each.

Further development on the game's user interface began using the principle that the game needed to be both accessible and charming, being able to draw in new players and to be clear how to play the game. Unity is used as the game engine in the interest of speed and to make the game run smoother since the server is where all of the rules exist and calculations happen then the server tells the client what happened. Dodds stated that "it's important that you don't have to spend a lot of time understanding the rules to play the game, the depth grows as you go." Gameplay elements such as pre-made decks for each hero, deck building helps, and visual cues on which cards could be played were used to guide new players. Card text was written in a way so that a new player should be able to immediately understand the effects.

From the beginning, the game was designed to be played solely online and to mimic the feel of physical cards to make it more accessible to new players. Dodds found that past attempts to digitize physical card games by other companies left areas they felt were lacking, and wanted to improve on that experience. One particular example is card games where players have the ability to react to other players; Dodds noted that when playing in the same room as another player, these types of interactions are straightforward, but consume a great deal of time in a virtual space. Hearthstone was designed to eliminate any gameplay from the opponent during the player's turn, streamlining the game.

Other aspects of the game's interface were set to replicate the feel of a physical game being watched by an audience: Hearthstone starts with the player opening a box, during gameplay the cards waver and move while in their hand, and cards when played slam down on the board. When attacking, cards leap across the board to strike the target; when a massive spike of damage is dealt, the board shakes; when a massive creature is summoned, the unseen audience gasps in awe. Hearthstone also offers interactive boards. The boards on which the cards are played can be interacted with in various ways, such as virtually petting a dragon, although the feature is purely for entertainment and has no effect on gameplay. This idea came out from the movie Jumanji in which a board game comes to life, and also mimics how physical card players would often toy with their cards while waiting on their opponent.

Unlike physical trading card games, Hearthstone was designed early on without any trading system between players. Hamilton Chu, the executive producer of Hearthstone, stated that "a key thing for us was focusing on [the user]... playing the game", and that trading and market features would dilute this experience. Blizzard wanted to do things such as avoid a free market where card values could fluctuate, discourage cheating methods like bots and duping, reduce the unauthorized third party sales (all against the terms of use), and keep the profit derived from the game for the company.

The game's name, Hearthstone, was meant to imply to a close gathering of friends by a hearth, a goal of what they want players to feel. According to Chayes, they had experimented with other constructs of where these card games would take place, and only about halfway through development came onto the idea of using a pub's hearth as the theme; Chayes stated that with that concept, "this is a great way to play, it works with all our values, it has a lot of charm". To maintain a friendly environment around this construct, they added in the ability to trigger one of a few friendly compliments that can be said by a hero, so that players could still emote to their opponent without having to worry about any vitriol.

=== Soundtrack ===
The soundtrack was composed by Peter McConnell; with trailer music by Jason Hayes. According to McConnell and Dodds, who oversaw the music direction, they wanted to create a soundtrack that would reflect the tavern setting they had established for the game, but they did not want to overwhelm this theme. McConnell came upon the idea of mixing Celtic music with blues rock—pondering the idea of "what if ZZ Top or Golden Earring had been transported back in time to the Middle Ages?"—and working in other previous Warcraft themes among the new songs with help from Hayes. Hayes also worked with Glenn Stafford to create short "stingers" of music used when players summon Legendary cards.

=== Beta changes ===
The beta testing periods were used to evaluate the game's balance, adjusting cards found to be too powerful or too weak, and making sure no single hero or deck type dominated the game. As they approached the game's release in March 2014, Blizzard found that it was hard to generate interest in getting people to try the game; those they asked to try the game felt that Hearthstone was not the type of game they would be interested in playing. At this point, Blizzard opted to make Hearthstone free to play and while card packs can be bought with in-game currency earned through winning matches and completing quests, players can also buy packs if they do not want to wait on earning currency. This helped to significantly boost the game's popularity on release and led to the development of the "quests" feature, further allowing players to earn more in game rewards for free.

=== Ongoing support ===
Blizzard provides regular bug fixes, updates, and expansions for Hearthstone. Hamilton Chu, the former executive producer for Hearthstone, stated that Blizzard intends to support the game for ten to twenty years. The principle means that additional cards have been introduced to the game are through either themed Expansions or Adventures. Blizzard had originally envisioned to release Expansions in a staged approach as to not drastically jar the player community, creating the Adventure concept for the first post-release addition with Curse of Naxxramas. The meta-game remained unpredictable for several months, helping to keep the playing community interested in playing the game and invalidating their strategies. The solo challenges on Adventure mode also served as a means to help players understand some of the stronger archetypes of card decks and learn strategies to defeat them, helping them become better players against human opponents. From 2017 in the "Year of the Mammoth", expansions focused around the new card sets, forgoing the first Adventures format, but new solo adventure types were later added.

Development of the themes and mechanics for each Expansion and Adventure are often based on the current atmosphere around the Hearthstone community, according to senior designer Mike Donais. While early expansions were based on the Warcraft franchise, the developers have been able to move away from staying with that narrative and are free to create new aspects not established by Warcraft. This idea was reflected by the dropping of the "Heroes of Warcraft" subtitle from the game's name around December 2016 to demonstrate to new players that the game was no longer tied to Warcraft.

In addition to new cards and mechanics, Blizzard has also worked to add new features to Hearthstone itself. The Tavern Brawl mode was in development for over a year before it was released in June 2015; the feature went through many iterations before the team was satisfied. Dodds equated the Tavern Brawl mode as a place to try experimental mechanics that may later be introduced to the game, as well as to offer gameplay that varies significantly from other areas of play within Hearthstone. Blizzard experimented with cross-platform play during development, having successfully played a game on PC against a player using an iPad; however, it was not a feature at launch. Cross-platform play was added in April 2014.

The introduction of the Standard vs. Wild formats in April 2016 was an issue that the developers knew since Hearthstone's initial release that they would need to address; according to Brode, as new cards were introduced to the game, they recognized that new players would start to find the game inaccessible, while adjusting the balance of the meta-game of which cards from previous expansions had proven over- or underused. The ideas for how to actually implement Standard mode started about a year before its introduction. Though they will continue to design the game to maintain the appropriate balance for the Standard format, they will also monitor how future cards will impact the Wild format and make necessary changes to keep that mode entertaining. With the "Year of the Mammoth" changes to Standard, the designers opted to move some Classic cards to a new "Hall of Fame" set that is not usable in Standard. They found that these cards were often "auto-includes" for certain deck types, and created a stagnant metagame around those decks, and opted to move them out of Standard. As compensation, those that own these Hall of Fame cards received the arcane dust value of the cards they possess while still being able to use those cards in Wild.

The "Hall of Fame" format also allows Blizzard to move Classic cards that have been nerfed (purposely weakened) previously to be un-nerfed and moved into the "Hall of Fame"; Blizzard found that players using Wild decks were impacted significantly by these nerfs and this approach would allow those deck formats to still thrive without disrupting Standard. To make up for cards moving out of Classic, Blizzard may consider bringing in individual cards from retired sets into the Classic set that they believe would be suitable for Standard. The associated switch of Arena mode from Wild to Standard with modified card rarity distributions with the "Year of the Mammoth" update was aimed to keep the pool of cards available to draft smaller, increasing the chances of drafting cards that they had intended to be used in synergistic combinations from the individual expansions.

In July 2019, several cards underwent artwork changes (and two were renamed) to be less graphically violent and sexualized. Lead mission designer Dave Kosak said, "It wasn't because we were looking at ratings, or international [regulations], or anything like that. We really just wanted our artists to feel good about everything in the set."

Starting in 2020 and ongoing, Blizzard started to view Hearthstone as a platform for multiple game modes rather than fixed around the main one-on-one game. Internally, multiple "strike teams" within Blizzard worked on the multiple aspects of this new approach simultaneously, with some teams working on the game modes while others work on new card and expansion ideas.

== Release ==
Hearthstone was first announced with the subtitle Heroes of Warcraft at Penny Arcade Expo in March 2013 for Windows, Mac, and iPad, with an expected release date in the same year. Internal beta testing of the game within Blizzard began in 2012. In August 2013, the game went into closed beta, to which over one million players had been invited as of November 8, 2013, with plans to enter open beta in December. Blizzard continued closed beta into mid-January 2014 despite their original estimation. Blizzard announced open beta for North America on January 21, 2014. Open beta was announced for Europe on January 22, 2014 and on January 23, 2014, open beta was made available in all regions.

The game was released on March 11, 2014, available on Microsoft Windows and OS X operating systems. By the end of March 2014, the game had more than 10 million player accounts registered worldwide. On April 2, 2014, the game began rolling out for iPad in Australia, Canada and New Zealand. On August 6, 2014, support for Windows 8 touchscreen devices was added to the game, although not for Windows RT devices. On December 15, 2014, the game began rolling out for Android tablet devices in Australia, Canada and New Zealand with a full release in the days later.

On April 14, 2015 was fully released on iOS and Android mobile devices. The smartphone version of the game includes new UI elements that place the player's hand on the bottom right but only half visible, so players must tap on their hand to zoom in and play cards. Single cards can also be viewed full screen by tapping and holding on a specific card, which is useful to read all the card details while using a smartphone display.

=== In-game promotions ===
To mark the release of Hearthstone, Blizzard released the Hearthsteed mount for World of Warcraft players that is obtained by winning three games in Arena or Play mode. Widely advertised on various World of Warcraft websites, this promotion encourages players to try Hearthstone, and marked the first significant crossover implemented between Blizzard games. Since then, multiple promotions have been implemented in other Blizzard titles such as Diablo III: Reaper of Souls, Heroes of the Storm, StarCraft II: Legacy of the Void and Overwatch.

An alternate hero for Shaman, Morgl the Oracle, is available through Hearthstone's "Recruit A Friend" program after the recruited friend reaches level 20. Players that connected their Amazon Prime subscription to Twitch Prime in late 2016 earned the alternate Priest hero Tyrande Whisperwind. Other Twitch Prime promotions have included a golden pack, which is a Classic card pack that only contains golden versions of cards, two exclusive card backs, and two Kobolds & Catacombs packs.

Since the Blackrock Mountain adventure, each expansion and adventure have introduced an exclusive card back for players that pre-ordered it. The Boomsday Project, Rastakhan's Rumble, Rise of Shadows, Saviors of Uldum, Descent of Dragons, Ashes of Outland, Scholomance Academy, Madness at the Darkmoon Faire, and Forged in the Barrens expansions each offered an alternate hero portrait as a bonus for ordering the largest preorder bundle: Mecha-Jaraxxus for Warlock, King Rastakhan for Shaman, Madame Lazul for Priest, Elise Starseeker for Druid, Deathwing for Warrior, Lady Vashj for Shaman, Kel'Thuzad for Mage, N'Zoth for Warlock, and Hamuul Runetotem for Druid respectively.

=== Other media ===
To promote the Journey to Un'Goro set, Blizzard made a web series called "Wonders Of Un'Goro" featuring an adventurer exploring the area.

Before releasing the Knights of the Frozen Throne set, Blizzard worked with Dark Horse Comics to publish a three-issue comic book series based on the set's Death Knight theme.

To promote the Kobolds & Catacombs set, Blizzard released "The Light Candle", a live-action short spoofing films from Jim Henson of the 1980s while its characters are exploring a dungeon.

== Esports ==
Thanks to the designers' focus on accessibility and fast-paced gameplay, Hearthstone has been the focus of a number of tournaments. Blizzard hosted an exhibition tournament in November 2013 called "The Innkeeper's Invitational" with three decks each of a different class, featuring several well-known gamers such as Dan "Artosis" Stemkoski, Octavian "Kripparrian" Morosan, Jeffrey "TrumpSC" Shih and Byron "Reckful" Bernstein. Artosis won the best-of-five tournament. Hearthstone was the focus of a number of other tournaments during its closed beta, including those hosted by Major League Gaming and ESL. In March 2014, The esports organization Tespa announced the Collegiate Hearthstone Open, a free-to-enter tournament open to all North American college students, featuring $5,000 in scholarships. Major League Gaming, ESL and the ZOTAC Cup all continue to regularly host minor Hearthstone leagues in the North American and European territories with small or no prize pools aimed at everyday players. Blizzard staff were stated to have been surprised with the game's success as an esport during its closed beta.

In April 2014, Blizzard announced the first Hearthstone World Championship would be held at BlizzCon on November 7–8. The tournament featured players from each of the game's four regions, with each region holding its own regional qualifying tournament. The Americas and Europe regions' qualifiers featured 160 players each and determined half of those players from actual in-game performance in Ranked play during the April–August seasons. The four most successful participants of each region's qualifiers went to the World Championship, for a total of 16 players. The Hearthstone World Championship 2014 featured a total prize pool of $250,000, and the American winner, James "Firebat" Kostesich, received $100,000.

The second Hearthstone World Championship was held at BlizzCon 2015 on November 7 with players selected in a similar way in the previous year and it was played in the best-of-five conquest format; the Swede winner, Sebastian "Ostkaka" Engwall, received $100,000. The third World Championship was held at BlizzCon 2016 on November 5 and the Russian winner, Pavel Beltiukov, received $250,000. It was played in a Swiss-system tournament format and one class could be banned from use by the opponent. The fourth World Championship had a $1 million prize pool and took place in January 2018; it was held in Amsterdam.

The championship was moved to January to better accommodate the timing for Standard mode's yearly rotation. The Taiwanese winner, Chen "tom60229" Wei Lin, received $250,000. The fifth Hearthstone World Championship took place in April 2019 and was held in Taipei; the winner was Norwegian Casper "Hunterace" Notto that received $250,000. The first Hearthstone Grandmasters Global Finals was held at BlizzCon 2019; the Chinese winner was Xiaomeng "VKLiooon" Li, who received $200,000; VKLiooon was the first woman to win the Hearthstone World Championship and to also win any BlizzCon tournament. The seventh Hearthstone World Championship winner was Japanese Kenta "Glory" Sato who received $200,000.

Hearthstone has also been a part of a number of esport demonstration events at international competitions, such as the 2017 Asian Indoor and Martial Arts Games and 2018 Asian Games.

== Reception ==
Reception

Aggregate score
Aggregator	Score
Metacritic	IOS: 93/100; PC: 88/100

Review scores
Publication	Score
Eurogamer	10/10
Game Informer	9/10
GameSpot	8/10
IGN	9/10
PC Gamer (US)	80/100
TouchArcade	5/5

Edit on Wikidata

Hearthstone received "universal acclaim" on iOS and "generally favorable" reviews for PC, according to review aggregator Metacritic. The game was praised for its simplicity, gameplay pace, and attention to detail along with being free-to-play, while the lack of actual card trading between players and any form of tournament mode was pointed out as the major shortcomings.

Eurogamer gave the game the perfect score of 10 and remarked that the game is "overflowing with character and imagination, feeds off and fuels a vibrant community of players and performers, and it only stands to improve as Blizzard introduces new features, an iPad version and expansions."

IGN and Game Informer both gave the game a slightly lower grade of 9/10, with IGN's Justin Davis praising the game for its "elegant simplicity of rules" and "impressive attention to detail and personality, and the true viability of playing completely for free make it easy to fall under its spell and get blissfully lost in the depths of its strategic possibilities."

GameSpot gave the game a score of 8/10, praising the game for its depth and complexity. The only major drawback noted was that the "absence of extra features hampers long-term appeal".

Later Hearthstone card expansions have also been well received. Game Informer rated the Curse of Naxxramas expansion 9/10, stating "Naxxramas is an excellent addition to the core game, and an exploration of sorts to examine the potential for additional single-player Hearthstone content [...] the adventure provides a substantial amount of new content that spills over into ranked, casual, and arena mode and changes how you approach the game." PC Gamer found that "[Curse of Naxxramas is] a much-needed and fun refresher for Blizzard’s card battler", however "the next card expansion will need to be more sizeable", rating it 78/100. Reception for Goblins vs Gnomes has also been positive, with Game Informer writing "the first expansion set for Hearthstone is a major step forward for the already accessible and fun game", and awarding it a score of 9.25/10, while Eurogamer scored it an 8/10, writing "whatever happens to Hearthstone in the future, the new content has stumbled a little by strengthening certain deck archetypes that needed no such help [...] it's re-introduced a thoughtfulness to play that's been absent for too long."

Commentators have noted that Hearthstone can suffer from "pay to win" mechanics, that those that invest monetarily into the game to get new cards and packs have generally a better chance of winning, though it is possible to be successful without spending money. Some have observed that with some of the newer expansions, with the need for strong Legendary cards to construct good decks around, one may need to spend about $50 to $100 to get the right cards to maintain many successful decks in the Standard format, belying the game's free-to-play nature. Daniel Friedman for Polygon estimated in 2017 that to maintain a complete collection would cost about $400 between booster pack purchases per year. Friedman argues the need to stay current for hard-core players is compounded by the power creep that comes with each new expansion that tends to diminish the effects of cards from older expansions. Friedman does add that this cost is less an issue since it is still possible to rank well during each season play with fundamental deck types. A class-action lawsuit was brought against Blizzard in May 2022, asserting that Hearthstone encourages minors to spend non-refundable money on card packs as to try to get the rarer cards, which violates the California Family Code.

=== Sales and playerbase ===
By September 2014, there were more than 20 million registered Hearthstone players and by January 2015, there were more than 25 million. As of June 2015, the active players were estimated to be about eight million PC players and nine million mobile device players, with some overlap between each group. Blizzard reported 30 million players in May 2015, 40 million in November 2015 and 50 million in April 2016. Blizzard reported it gained 20 million players over the following year, reaching 70 million unique players, and that they saw record numbers for simultaneous players during the launch of the Journey to Un'Goro expansion in April 2017. By November 2018, Blizzard stated that Hearthstone had achieved over 100 million players. In the November 2021 Year of the Phoenix Review, Blizzard reported that there were over 20 million active players in 2020.

On May 6, 2015, Activision Blizzard announced that Hearthstone and Destiny generated nearly $1 billion in revenue for the company. According to SuperData Research, in June 2015 Hearthstone generated about $20 million in revenue during that month. KeyBanc Capital Markets estimates that Hearthstone generates an annual revenue of $600 million worldwide, as of July 2019.

Hearthstone has proved to be a popular game to stream and watch on services like Twitch; Hearthstone-based streams overtook Dota 2 streams to become the third-most watched game on the platform in September 2015 and it was the fourth-most watched game in April 2016. In March 2017, Hearthstone was still the fourth-most watched game while nearly matching Dota 2's hours.

On Jan 23, 2023, players in China lost access to Blizzard's games because the company's license agreement to use NetEase servers expired, and disagreed over the continuation of the agreement. On July 28, 2024, in the ChinaJoy 2024 event, it was announced by Executive Producer Nathan Lyons-Smith that Hearthstone would return to China on September 25, 2024. Returning players in China were given golden copies of all cards released in 2023 for free, as well as various other in-game cosmetics and rewards.

=== Awards ===
Forbes awarded Hearthstone as the "Best Digital Card Game" of 2013. At The Game Awards 2014, Hearthstone was awarded with "Best Mobile/Handheld Game", along with nominations for "Best Online Experience" and "Game of the Year". In December 2014, GameSpot awarded Hearthstone with "Mobile Game of the Year". GameTrailers awarded Hearthstone with "Multiplayer Game of the Year" and "Best Overall Game of 2014". At the 18th Annual D.I.C.E. Awards, the Academy of Interactive Arts & Sciences awarded Hearthstone with "Mobile Game of the Year" and "Strategy/Simulation Game of the Year"; it also received nominations for "Game of the Year", "Outstanding Achievement in Game Design", "Outstanding Achievement in Online Gameplay", and "Outstanding Innovation in Gaming". Hearthstone would again be nominated for "Outstanding Achievement in Online Gameplay" during the following year's awards ceremony, as well as the next one after that.

At the 11th British Academy Video Games Awards, Hearthstone won for best "Multiplayer", along with nominations for best "Mobile & Handheld" and "Game Design". At the 2014 NAVGTR Awards, Hearthstone won the "Game, Strategy" (Dan Elggren) award. The One Night in Karazhan expansion pack won the award each for "Best Handheld Audio" and "Best Sound Design in a Casual/Social Game" at the 15th Annual Game Audio Network Guild Awards, whereas its other nomination was for "Best Music in a Casual/Social Game". In 2018, the Kobolds & Catacombs expansion pack was nominated for "Best Sound Design in a Casual/Social Game", while the game itself won the award for "Best Original Song" with "Hearth and Home" at the 16th Annual Game Audio Network Guild Awards. In 2019, The Boomsday Project won the awards for "Best Music in a Casual/Social Game" and "Best Sound Design in a Casual/Social Game" at the 17th Annual Game Audio Network Guild Awards.
