= Orcs in Warcraft =

Fictional race in the Warcraft franchise

Orcs
- Warcraft race
- Renders of in-game character models for World of Warcraft depicting a typical green-skinned male (left) and female (right) orc respectively.
- First appearance: Warcraft: Orcs & Humans (1994)
- Created by: Blizzard Entertainment

In-universe information
- Home world: Draenor
- Type: Humanoid
- Distinctions: Tusks

In the Warcraft media franchise created by Blizzard Entertainment, the orcs are a fictional humanoid race closely associated with the Horde, a multiracial political and military coalition in the world of Azeroth. Introduced as an extradimensional invading army and the enemies of humanity in the 1994 real-time strategy game Warcraft: Orcs & Humans, orcs are one of the franchise's principal playable peoples in video game media.

Originally from the world of Draenor, orcs are usually depicted as large, muscular humanoids with tusks, heavy jaws, and green, brown or gray skin. The portrayal of the orcs changed substantially as the franchise expanded. The first two Warcraft games presented the orcs mainly as a destructive force empowered by demonic "fel" magic. The 2001 novel Lord of the Clans, the 2002 video game Warcraft III: Reign of Chaos and other subsequent media revealed their origins as an older, shamanistic culture that had been corrupted by external forces. This revision positioned the orc leader Thrall as a sympathetic protagonist and turned the recovery of orc cultural history into a recurring subject. Later stories continued to revisit the legacy of the original Horde, particularly through characters such as Varok Saurfang, whose guilt over past atrocities and contested understanding of honor became part of the faction's later narrative. The 2016 film adaptation, Warcraft, likewise devotes one of its parallel narratives to Thrall's birth family and their resistance against the demonic corruption of the orcs' culture and spiritual beliefs instigated by the warlock Gul'dan.

The Warcraft franchise's orcs have been discussed by scholars and cultural critics as a prominent revision of the innately evil species popularised by the fantasy works of J. R. R. Tolkien. Their increased moral agency and cultural detail have been interpreted as a move from a conflict between good and evil species toward a conflict of interests among peoples. Critics have nevertheless argued that their designs and stories originate from colonial racial stereotypes, that World of Warcraft treats culture and behavior as properties of biological race, and that the sympathetic orc may substitute the stereotype of the "noble savage" for that of the monster. Other studies emphasize the role of players, game mechanics, and collective behavior in producing the meaning of orc identity beyond the authored narrative.

== Concept and development ==
=== Origins and visual design ===
The premise of Warcraft: Orcs & Humans emerged after Blizzard co-founder Allen Adham proposed a series of real-time strategy games set in different historical periods. According to the game's producer and lead programmer Patrick Wyatt, designer Ron Millar and artist Sam Didier instead proposed a high-fantasy conflict between humans and orcs. The change gave Blizzard's artists greater freedom to invent creatures and environments than a historical setting would have allowed. Wyatt described the miniatures game Warhammer Fantasy Battle as a major visual influence on the artists. Blizzard considered seeking a Warhammer licence, but members of the development team preferred to control their setting and avoid the compromises of licensed work.

The first game's design developed through an informal, company-wide process rather than a single design document. Wyatt recalled that employees throughout Blizzard contributed ideas, while Ron Millar and Stu Rose developed much of the setting, units, mechanics, missions, and other details. He attributed the game's bright, cartoon-like palette partly to the artists' experience developing console games, where strong visual contrast helped compensate for low display resolution, and to Allen Adham's insistence that artwork remain legible under bright lighting.

Didier later described the original art direction as relatively restrained because the team believed computer players expected realism and a conventional medieval European setting. After the first game succeeded, the artists treated Warcraft II: Tides of Darkness as an opportunity to define the orcs and the surrounding world more clearly. They added a wider range of fantasy species and humor, increased the comic book influence, and emphasized bulky proportions and primary colors. By Warcraft III, Blizzard felt that it is viable to push this stylization much further and use visually distinctive hero units as focal characters.

=== Narrative reinterpretation ===
The two campaigns of Orcs & Humans required Blizzard to write from the perspective of both armies, but the original premise remained a simple opposition between the invading Orcish Horde and defending Human Alliance. Warcraft II broadened the orc roster and gave named leaders competing motives: the warchief Orgrim Doomhammer was distinguished from the warlock Gul'dan, whose pursuit of power undermined the invasion. The sequel therefore introduced political division inside the Horde without yet displacing the orcs' role as the principal aggressors.

The cancelled adventure game Warcraft Adventures: Lord of the Clans was built around a different type of orc protagonist. Its story followed Thrall, an orc raised by humans who learns about his people's past and frees orcs held in internment camps after the Second War. Although Blizzard cancelled the game, Christie Golden adapted its premise in the 2001 novel Lord of the Clans, and Thrall became a central character in Warcraft III. This story established that the orcs had possessed a clan-based, shamanistic society before Gul'dan and the Burning Legion enslaved them.

Warcraft III made this reinterpretation part of the structure of the game. Instead of two mirrored armies, the player controls four factions in succession, whose protagonists alternately cooperate and often come into conflict with members of the same peoples which occupy heroic and antagonistic role. Thrall's campaign depicts an exodus from the lands of the human kingdoms, the establishment of new alliances with tauren and troll tribes, and the establishment of a seat of power in the continent of Kalimdor. This separated "orc" from "Horde": the former became one people within the latter, and the Horde's army was framed as a coalition rather than an undifferentiated mass.

In an interview about the portrayal of an alternate version of the orcish Horde, Blizzard creative director Alex Afrasiabi described Thrall and Garrosh Hellscream as opposing sides of a shared commitment to the Horde. He said that Garrosh’s desire to restore his father Grom and the old warchiefs drove the alternate-Draenor premise of Warlords of Draenor Later stories also returned to the history of the old Horde through Varok Saurfang, a veteran whose characterization centers on his memories of its atrocities and his conflicted understanding of honor.

=== Film adaptation ===
The 2016 film Warcraft returns to the period of the first invasion while retaining the characterization developed in later games. Blizzard concept artist Wei Wang supplied initial designs for its principal orcs, including Durotan, performed by Toby Kebbell, and Draka, performed by Anna Galvin. Industrial Light & Magic (ILM) combined those designs with scans and performances of the actors. The filmmakers rejected extensive prosthetic makeup because the height, jaw size, and shoulder width of the game designs would have been difficult to reproduce without limiting facial expression.

Director Duncan Jones and the visual-effects team treated the quiet opening between Durotan and his pregnant partner Draka as a test of whether the digital characters could sustain close-ups and domestic intimacy. ILM retained human-looking eyes and transferred the actors' facial movement to much larger heads rather than having animators replace their performances. Because the tusks changed how the lips could move, the studio developed additional deformation controls to preserve speech and expression. Actors also trained with movement coach Terry Notary to develop a shared physical vocabulary for the orcs.

ILM created 100 distinct orcs, including eight principal characters, and produced 287 photoreal assets for the film. The five clans were differentiated through costume and physical details, including armor made from materials such as bark, bone, and metal, together with different colors, piercings, scars, and tattoos. The studio developed or extended tools for skin shading, hair grooming, muscle simulation, and performance capture. For green skin, the artists shifted subsurface scattering toward yellow because neutral green appeared artificial while adding red produced a gray cast. ILM visual-effects supervisor Jason Smith said that the orcs had to sustain roughly half of the film, making believable eyes, skin, and facial performance central to their design.

== Depiction ==
=== Early antagonists ===
Warcraft: Orcs & Humans begins after a portal connects the orc homeworld Draenor to Azeroth. The human campaign depicts the orcs as an invading army serving the sorcerer Medivh, while the orc campaign allows the player to conduct the invasion and destroy the human kingdom. Both factions have workers, melee troops, ranged units, spellcasters, and siege weapons, but their names and presentation establish a moral contrast. Human "peasants", "footmen", and "knights" are opposed by orc "peons", "grunts", and "raiders"; in contrast to their human counterparts who use holy magic, orc spellcasters summon demons and animate corpses as undead servants. The game's cover art likewise sets a horned, fur-clad orc against an armored human knight.

Warcraft II: Tides of Darkness reveals that the orcs came from Draenor and that their invasion is organized through clans and unstable alliances. Gul'dan uses demonic magic and manipulates the orc Warchief Blackhand into leading the invasion on Azeroth, but Doomhammer kills Blackhand and takes command. The Horde includes ogres, trolls, goblins, and dragons as well as orcs, but remains the villainous antagonist of the Alliance campaign. Gul'dan's betrayal divides Doomhammer's army at a decisive point, allowing the Alliance to defeat it and place surviving orcs in camps. The destruction of Draenor depicted in Warcraft II: Beyond The Dark Portal, and the imprisonment of the survivors become the basis for the later reinterpretation.

=== From Lord of the Clans to Warcraft III ===
Lord of the Clans presents orc history through Thrall's attempt to recover an identity denied to him by his human captors. He learns that the orc clans had once been connected by periodic gatherings, ancestor worship, and relationships with elemental spirits. He discovered that Gul'dan's regime suppressed the shamans, encouraged the clans to drink the blood of the demon Mannoroth, and turned an existing warrior culture into a bloodthirsty war machine. Thrall rejects both subjugation by the humans and a simple return to conquest for the orcs. He reunites the clans, restores shamanistic practices, and frees the imprisoned orcs, becoming Warchief of a reconstituted Horde.

In Warcraft III: Reign of Chaos, a prophetic warning given by Medivh was heeded by Thrall, who takes the Horde west from the human kingdoms. The orcs ally with the Darkspear trolls and tauren, fight a group of demon-aligned orcs, and eventually cooperate with humans and night elves against the Burning Legion and their undead servants. The climax of the orc campaign revisits Mannoroth's control: the orc hero Grommash "Grom" Hellscream kills the demon and dies in the act, releasing the orcs from the blood curse. The campaign consequently combines exodus, recovery of tradition, and atonement for past violence. By the events of Warcraft III: The Frozen Throne, Thrall's Horde settles in Durotar and builds Orgrimmar, but the hostile landscape and continuing conflict with neighboring peoples prevent the ending from functioning as a complete reconciliation.

=== World of Warcraft and later stories ===
In World of Warcraft, orcs were one of the original player character choices for the Horde, alongside trolls, tauren, and the undead Forsaken. Their capital, starting region, quests, architecture, and racial abilities associate them with physical strength, endurance, wolves, shamanism, and the recent wars. Character creation lets players inhabit the race instead of controlling it only as an army, but the game's faction system normally prevents an orc player from communicating or grouping with Alliance characters. The category chosen at character creation therefore affects both fictional identity and access to other players.

Subsequent expansions repeatedly place orc leaders on opposing sides about the direction of the Horde. Thrall is presented from the outset as a diplomatic and spiritual figure whose responsibilities extend beyond his own people. His successor Garrosh Hellscream, the son of Grom Hellscream, rejects that approach: he excludes non-orcs from his inner circle of advisors and confidantes, expands Horde territory by force, utilises weapons of mass destruction, and becomes the final principal enemy of Mists of Pandaria. Warlords of Draenor then visits an alternate Draenor in which Garrosh prevents the orc clans from accepting demonic blood and organizes them into the technologically armed Iron Horde.

The story of Varok Saurfang returns the Warcraft franchise to the question of whether the orcs can blame their history of violence on demonic corruption or despotic leaders. A veteran of the original Horde, he is characterized by guilt over wartime atrocities in which he willingly participated, and by an ideal of honor that he has repeatedly failed to uphold. During Battle for Azeroth, Saurfang helps plan the Horde's invasion of night elf territory, but the burning of Teldrassil on Warchief Sylvanas Windrunner's orders causes him to recognize the contemporary Horde as repeating the war crimes committed under her predecessors. Saurfang later travels to Outland in search of Thrall, who has retired from public life with his family. After assassins sent by Sylvanas attack them, Thrall returns to the conflict alongside Saurfang. His decision to take up his axe and accompany Saurfang restores the principal architect of the reformed orcs to public responsibility.

When the rebellion reaches Orgrimmar, Saurfang challenges Sylvanas to mak'gora, a ritual duel to the death. Sylvanas kills him, but his defiance provokes her into exposing her contempt for the peoples she leads, which destroys her authority before the soldiers defending Orgrimmar and causes her to abandon the city. Thrall thereafter resumes responsibility for the orcs but does not become Warchief again. The Horde replaced the office of Warchief with a ruling council that included Thrall.

=== Warcraft film ===
The 2016 film adaptation tells a separate version of the first war and places much of its orc narrative around Durotan and the Frostwolf clan. Durotan turns against Gul'dan and attempts to cooperate with the humans, but his alliance with human commander Anduin Lothar and the half-orc emissary Garona fails to prevent war. Durotan and Draka's infant son Go'el is sent away before their deaths at the hands of Gul'dan and his agents, establishing the film's version of Thrall's origin.

== Reception and analysis ==
=== Reinvention of the fantasy orc ===
Commentators have treated the franchise's orcs as part of a wider revision of the generic fantasy monster. Writing for Inverse, Zebbie Watson observed the 1994 Orcs & Humans game could use an "endless warring horde" because it needed a readily understood enemy, but that the growing setting required the orcs to develop with it. She contrasted the largely interchangeable antagonists of the first game with later depictions containing distinct cultures, religions, families, gender roles, and degrees of militarism. Turning to the Warcraft film, she argued that the story structure places an orc family at the emotional center of a story that the first game told mainly as an invasion, in a departure from the tropes about orcs inherited from Tolkien-derived works, which had become a staple of the fantasy genre. From her perspective, the film condenses that history by bringing the moral nuance of the contemporary games back to the period of the original invasion.

Author G. Willow Wilson described Thrall as a tragic hero and argued that the franchise gave a conventional villainous species motives and an intelligible point of view. For Wilson, this reflected a broader movement away from fantasy peoples whose physical differences from human features automatically signified evil intent. She was less positive about the particular alternative: spiritualism, closeness to nature, and warrior honor could make the rehabilitated orc a version of the "noble savage" rather than escape racialized convention.

Mesarović interprets the change as a shift in the franchise's model of personhood. In his reading, Orcs & Humans uses a "theological" division: humans can be good or corrupt individuals, whereas orcs function as moral nulls associated with demons and lack a meaningful capacity for good. Lord of the Clans does more than reveal previously unseen customs; it reclassifies the old Horde as a deviation from the original orc culture and society, and makes an orc point of view heroic. The supernatural enemy is transferred from a supposedly evil humanoid species to demons, undead, and other forces that threaten multiple peoples. Mesarović reads Thrall’s campaign in Warcraft III as an exodus narrative in which the orcs recover shamanistic traditions and seek a new homeland,and further argued that Warcraft III supports this change through play rather than exposition alone. Its sequential campaigns require the player to control humans, undead, orcs, and night elves, preventing one racial perspective from remaining the unquestioned norm. Thrall's story invokes enslavement, internment, slurs about savagery, and a migration to a promised homeland, with cooperation at Mount Hyjal providing the game's answer to racial hatred. He nevertheless argues that the game presents prejudice chiefly as an error committed by individuals, without fully examining the unequal political relationship between the people who operated the internment camps and those imprisoned in them.

=== Race, colonialism, and essentialism ===
Levi Pressnell describes the original human–orc opposition as one of the foundational binaries of the setting. The cover and unit designs associate humans with medieval Christian Europe and orcs with axes, spears, wolves, crude language, and demon worship. Pressnell notes that the term "Horde", horned headgear, and the image of an invasion from the east also draw on Western representations of Mongol conquest. Green skin distances the characters from a direct representation of a living population, but the surrounding signs still make the orcs legible through an inherited vocabulary of the barbarian invader. For Pressnell, Warcraft II begins to destabilize that vocabulary by making the Horde politically organized and its leaders capable of strategy, rivalry, and betrayal. Warcraft III goes further by recasting the orcs as displaced and oppressed, but it also exchanges their earlier role for that of a "noble savage" identified with shamanism, physicality, and the natural world. He argues that the Alliance and Horde continue to be structured through paired concepts — intellectual and physical, civilized and savage, attractive and grotesque — even when the story rejects a simple good-and-evil division. Gameplay statistics and visual motifs can preserve those oppositions after the narrative has made the orcs sympathetic.

Pressnell observed that major orc protagonists such as Thrall retained the broad shoulders, prominent lower tusks, and heavy facial structure of the early units while receiving more individualized faces and less bestial proportions. Rank-and-file warriors and antagonists could be pushed toward a more extreme version of the same silhouette. The result preserved green skin as the franchise's most recognizable shorthand for an orc while making the variations in physical appearance part of in-universe history of demonic corruption.

Jessica Langer similarly analyzes the Alliance as familiar and Western-coded and the Horde as a collection of foreign Others. She argues that Horde peoples combine visual and cultural signs associated with several colonized populations rather than correspond to a single real group. In the case of orcs, she reads aspects of their bodies and hairstyles as recalling colonial depictions of Black people, while the wider Horde also borrows from Indigenous American, African, and Caribbean cultures. Because the game assigns these signs to biologically separate species, cultural difference can appear innate instead of historically produced.

Melissa J. Monson focuses on the game's system of racial classification. She argues that World of Warcraft makes race an organizing principle for society and politics: the category selected during character creation influences language, alliances, starting geography, occupations, physical abilities, technology, and access to other players. Culture is therefore presented as an enduring property of a biological type. Monson regards the use of imaginary species as insufficient to remove the real-world essentialism of this structure, because the game continually instructs the player to understand social behavior through inherited racial categories.

Mesarović reads this development as a movement away from the first games' division between inherently good and evil peoples. In his account, Lord of the Clans recasts the violent Horde as a corrupted departure from an earlier orc society rather than an expression of innate orc nature, while Warcraft III allows members of the same peoples to occupy different moral positions and ultimately requires cooperation among former enemies. He nevertheless argues that Warcraft III tends to represent racism as the prejudice of individuals rather than as a stable system in which one group consistently occupies a dominant position.

=== Player identity and response ===
Joseph Packer argues that an orc's meaning in World of Warcraft is not fixed by visual design or authored narrative alone. He uses the term "racial cosmos" for a larger system produced by character options, game mechanics, popular fantasy images, player demographics, and the collective choices of millions of participants. When players favor particular races for certain activities or behave toward them in recurring ways, they create an emergent racial narrative that may reinforce or complicate the official fiction.

The 2018 "Shoulders for Saurfang" protest demonstrated how players could use orc imagery to comment on the story. Following the burning of Teldrassil, some Horde players said that they felt ideologically opposed to their own faction. A subsequent cinematic depicted Saurfang questioning Sylvanas Windrunner's leadership and removing his shoulder armor. Players began hiding their own characters' shoulder armor through the game's transmogrification system as a gesture of solidarity with Saurfang, with the campaign appearing on community forums and Reddit and developing an organized Discord community.

Steven Messner of PC Gamer described the response as an in-character reaction to Blizzard's storytelling. He noted that players had little control over the direction of the faction narrative, while character customization gave them a way to express support for Saurfang within the game itself. Matthew Rossi interpreted Saurfang’s fixation on honour in light of his participation in the old Horde’s atrocities, arguing that the burning of Teldrassil forced him to confront the Horde’s repetition of that history. Perculia likewise read the Battle for Azeroth finale as Saurfang acknowledging his complicity and using the mak’gora to expose Sylvanas before the Horde, ending the battle at the cost of his life. His dissent therefore does not absolve him of complicity; it represents an orc accepting responsibility for resisting another cycle of conquest rather than attributing it entirely to supernatural corruption or absolute obedience to a tyrannical leader.

=== Film reception ===
Although Warcraft received broadly unfavourable reviews, several critics found its computer-generated orcs more compelling than its live-action human characters. Justin Chang of the Los Angeles Times called Durotan an expressive standout and wrote that the film's introduction of the orcs established them as concerned with survival rather than conquest alone. He found most of the human characters less memorable by comparison. Emily St. James of Vox likewise found the orcs more emotionally effective than the human cast. She singled out Durotan and Draka's efforts to build a life and raise a family, while also noting that the film places sympathetic and antagonistic characters on both sides of its central conflict.

Barbara Robertson of Computer Graphics World noted that several critics discussed the computer-generated orcs in terms of the actors' performances rather than treating them simply as visual effects. She connected that response to ILM's effort to preserve performance-capture acting while giving the digital characters believable eyes, skin, and other facial details.

=== Legacy ===
Zebbie Watson argued that Warcraft helped establish one of the two dominant modern understandings of the orc in popular culture: that it is a people with cultures, histories, religions and families rather than as interchangeable monsters. Wilson placed Warcraft alongside The Elder Scrolls and Shadowrun as notable media series that have participated in an "orc renaissance" in Western fantasy in the aftermath of the 9/11 attacks.
