= Warcraft Adventures: Lord of the Clans =

Unreleased '90s adventure game

- Official box art
- Developers: Blizzard Entertainment; Animation Magic
- Publishers: Davidson & Associates, Cendant
- Designers: Bill Roper, Chris Metzen
- Platforms: Windows 95, Mac OS
- Release: Cancelled
- Genre: Graphic adventure
- Mode: Single-player

Warcraft Adventures: Lord of the Clans is a cancelled graphic adventure game developed by Blizzard Entertainment and Animation Magic from 1996 until 1998. Set in the Warcraft universe after the events of Warcraft II: Beyond the Dark Portal, it followed the orc character Thrall in his quest to reunite his race, then living on reservations and in slavery following its defeat by the human Alliance. Assuming the role of Thrall, the player would have used a point-and-click interface to explore the world, solve puzzles and interact with characters from the wider Warcraft series.

Warcraft Adventures was conceived in late 1996, when Blizzard's sister company Capitol Multimedia suggested that the Warcraft license might be suited to an adventure game. Blizzard co-developed the project with Animation Magic, a subdivision of Capitol responsible for the CD-i games from The Legend of Zelda series. The team opted for a conservative design approach influenced by LucasArts adventure games such as The Dig and Full Throttle. Blizzard struggled to adapt to the adventure genre, and delayed Warcraft Adventures past its original release date of late 1997. Game designer Steve Meretzky was hired to revise the project in February 1998, resulting in a plan to edit and improve the nearly-completed game with minimal changes to its art. Meretzky's plan went largely unused, as Blizzard determined that its implementation would lead to excessive delays. Instead, the project was canceled in May 1998, after roughly 18 months of work.

Warcraft Adventures received significant pre-release attention from the gaming public and press, and the decision to cancel it was met with fan backlash and critical disappointment. Despite the game's cancellation, its story was adapted into the novel Warcraft: Lord of the Clans (2001) by Christie Golden, and was the basis for Blizzard's real-time strategy game Warcraft III: Reign of Chaos. Elements of the game later influenced World of Warcraft and the 2016 film Warcraft. A nearly-finished version of the game was leaked online in September 2016. Reviewing the leaked version, critics generally praised its visuals, but several found its design uninspired.

== Gameplay and plot ==
Thrall (standing) speaks to two drunken orcs north of Khaz Modan.

Warcraft Adventures: Lord of the Clans was a graphic adventure game with a point-and-click interface, which the player would have used to navigate the world, collect items, solve puzzles and interact with non-player characters. It was set in the Warcraft universe two years after the events of Warcraft II: Beyond the Dark Portal. In that game, the human Alliance defeats the orc Horde, which is then split between Azeroth—the human plane—and the orc homeworld of Draenor. In Warcraft Adventures, the defeated orcs left on Azeroth were confined to reservations and reduced to slavery. Alcoholism and passivity spread among them. The player assumed the role of Thrall, an orc raised from infancy as a slave by the human Lieutenant Blackmoore, who had found Thrall on a battleground during the events of Warcraft: Orcs & Humans. Blackmoore kept Thrall from encountering other orcs throughout his early life, and sought to raise him as a pawn to rally the orcs as his personal military and conquer Azeroth.

In response to Thrall's failure to execute another orc, Blackmoore would have sent him to a dungeon cell, wherein the game began. As Thrall, the player was planned to have escaped Blackmoore's castle by impersonating a human. The player subsequently explored the wartorn Azeroth to learn about the orcs' plight and history, which would have led to the discovery that Thrall's race had abandoned its traditional shamanism and way of life in favor of black magic and demonic power. This shift had caused the orcs' evil actions in Warcraft: Orcs & Humans and Warcraft II: Tides of Darkness. To rebuild the Horde around its original traditions, Thrall sought to reunite its disparate factions by gaining the trust of the surviving chiefs, including Orgrim Doomhammer, Kilrogg Deadeye and Grom Hellscream. Thrall was eventually to be revealed as the son of Durotan, who had led the orcs' Frost Wolf Clan until his murder by the orc brothers Rend and Maim Blackhand. In the end, Thrall would have rallied the Horde as its leader, and led an attack against its human captors that defeated Blackmoore and the orc brothers Rend and Maim.

== Development ==
=== Conception ===
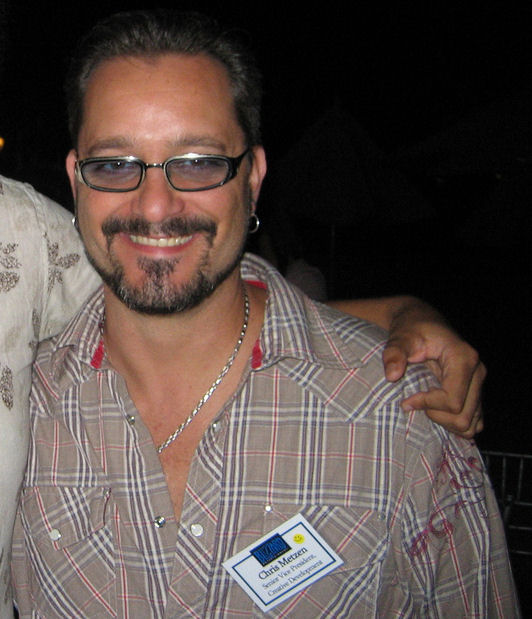
Blizzard Entertainment's Chris Metzen served as the writer for Warcraft Adventures: Lord of the Clans.

In the second half of 1996, Blizzard Entertainment's Allen Adham stated that his company was "looking into the possibilities of doing more with the orcs and humans, which includes non-game types of enterprises, but there's nothing in the works at the moment." Warcraft Adventures: Lord of the Clans was ultimately conceived at Blizzard late that year, around "four or five months" after the release of Warcraft II: Beyond the Dark Portal in May 1996, according to producer Bill Roper. The team's inspiration for the project was a proposal by Capitol Multimedia, a subsidiary of Blizzard parent Davidson & Associates, to use the Warcraft license for a graphic adventure game. Blizzard was introduced to the game development and animation studio Animation Magic, purchased by Capitol in 1995, and was impressed by its art department. The studio had previously produced titles including the Magic Tales series for Davidson, as well as the Legend of Zelda games for the CD-i game console. Roper noted that the company's work "totally reminded us of all of those adventure games we loved playing", and Blizzard chose to co-develop the game with the team.

Blizzard had considered a graphic adventure for several years, but lacked the capacity to create the art assets for such a game. The promise of working with a team experienced in the genre clinched the project. At the time, Roper compared Capitol's pitch to seeing Condor's original proposal for Diablo, and called it a "very natural course" for Blizzard and "a perfect fit for who we are." Chris Metzen, writer of Warcraft Adventures, said that Blizzard was also growing tired of the real-time strategy genre during that period. Roper similarly remarked that the company was hoping to branch out beyond strategy games, and to become a developer of varied titles that matched the "eclectic" taste of its staff. The Warcraft Adventures concept appealed to the team in part because it allowed greater room than a strategy title to explore Warcraft's setting, much of which was contained in an internal series bible. It was intended to create the story foundation upon which the series' next strategy entry, Warcraft III, would build. Blizzard's Rob Pardo later said that the project was the first time that the developer "started seeing [its franchises] as intellectual properties", without concrete ties to genre. The team envisioned Warcraft Adventures as the first game in a possible series of story-based Warcraft spin-offs in the adventure genre.

After agreeing to the project, Blizzard began to generate concept art for Animation Magic, and to develop the game design. The team opted for a purposely conservative approach to the design of Warcraft Adventures. During development, Roper said that the adventure genre had "very defined standards" and expectations, and that Blizzard was "not necessarily looking to make the next great innovation in adventure game interfaces or rewrite the book on how adventure games are done". To this end, the team focused on high-quality storytelling and comic writing, which it perceived as the genre's core traits. Roper later said that Blizzard hoped to copy the features of its favorite adventure games, in contrast to newer entries in the genre, which the team felt lacked an emphasis on plot, puzzles that emerged naturally from the world and strong voice-over work. The team's primary reference points were LucasArts adventure games, particularly the 1995 titles The Dig and Full Throttle, although without the latter's use of arcade-action sequences. Certain Sierra On-Line adventures inspired the team as well. In 2009, IGN's Travis Fahs summarized that the team designed the game "as fans", and sought to borrow from the period's best adventure titles in the way that Warcraft: Orcs & Humans had borrowed from Dune II.

=== Production ===
Production of Warcraft Adventures was split between multiple locations. Although the project direction and design occurred in Irvine, California at Blizzard Entertainment, the code and art were developed by divisions of Animation Magic: the former in Boston, and the latter in Saint Petersburg, Russia. By early 1997, the animation team at the Russian office numbered around 50 members, but this figure rose to roughly 100 by the following year. In addition, Blizzard coordinated with Capitol Multimedia during the project, and by 1998 the South Korean animation studio Toon-Us-In was involved in producing the full motion video animated cutscenes. The direction of the art was a collaborative effort. At the beginning, Bill Roper explained that Blizzard "gave [Animation Magic] a world sheet, which was basically 'Here is the world. This is what the characters are like. Here are sketches of some, some of the descriptions.' " The art team built from this framework, and periodically delivered the results to Blizzard for approval. Animation Magic also offered input on certain game design decisions, although Roper noted that "the vast majority" of Warcraft Adventures' design derived from Blizzard. As with all Blizzard projects of the time, the game was internally overseen by a small "Strike Team" within the company.

In writing the script, Blizzard sought to humanize and deepen the portrayal of the Orc race, whose situation in Warcraft Adventures Chris Metzen compared to that of real-world American Indians. The team hoped to make the story accessible and interesting to both Warcraft fans and newcomers, while including numerous characters from the strategy titles. Metzen likened the game's plot to the films Spartacus, Braveheart and Dances with Wolves, and described Warcraft Adventures as a hero's journey, in reference to the theories of Joseph Campbell. The choice to make the game a comedy derived in part from a desire to counterbalance its dark themes. According to Cindy Yans of Computer Games Strategy Plus, Blizzard fleshed out the cast via "tongue-in-cheek projection" of what it thought each character would do during peacetime.

Warcraft Adventures' script was not written for particular actors, and its initial voice-recording sessions in Boston did not include major names, although all roles were portrayed by professional union members. According to Metzen, Blizzard decided that "a few characters [...] needed an extra boost" after reviewing these tapes, and chose to seek more recognizable actors for certain key roles. The team began to recall its favorite voices from other properties, including that of Optimus Prime from The Transformers; and that character's actor, Peter Cullen, was hired as a result. Other hires during this period included Tony Jay, who appeared in 1996's The Hunchback of Notre Dame; and the voice of Thrall, Clancy Brown. While Roper had voiced characters in Warcraft II: Tides of Darkness, he was unable to contribute new lines to Warcraft Adventures because of union restrictions, as he was not a member. To circumvent this issue, lines that Roper had voiced in previous Warcraft games were inserted into certain scenes.

"A lot of it was that it just took a long time to get stuff. And a very large part of our design process is iteration, where we do something, we look at it, we see it, we see the next thing, and back and forth to polish it to just the way we want to see it. And that was very difficult working with someone who was that far away, to be honest. That was one of the biggest challenges I think we faced."

— Producer Bill Roper on co-developing the game with Animation Magic's Russian division

According to Colin Williamson of PC Gamer US, Blizzard struggled to adapt to the adventure genre. Roper commented in 1998 that the "development process in putting together an adventure title is very backwards from a real-time strategy game", since aspects such as voice recording and screenwriting occur at the beginning of the project. The production pipeline became a major source of problems for the team. While Blizzard used rapid iterative design techniques to develop its games, the distance between the teams creating Warcraft Adventures slowed down production and made the iteration process more challenging. Roper later recalled "a lot of odd-hour phone calls and faxing and e-mailing of files and working through language barriers" while managing the project.

The 2D animation style of Warcraft Adventures was chosen to maintain visual consistency with the Warcraft strategy games, a major concern of Blizzard's. This was in contrast to the pre-rendered 3D graphics featured in certain other games of the time, including Warcraft II: Tides of Darkness, whose 2D artwork had been drawn overtop pre-rendered 3D models. When it was announced in March 1997, Warcraft Adventures was slated to include above 40,000 individual animation frames, 70 characters and 60 areas for the player to visit. Around 20 minutes' worth of animated cutscenes were ultimately created for the game. The quality of Animation Magic's output was a concern for Blizzard, and the team had difficulty keeping the Russian team in line with the "anal-retentive" attention to detail of the Irvine team, according to Roper. Blizzard's Micky Neilson later recalled a moment early in the project when Metzen, alongside artists Samwise Didier and Ron Millar, traveled to the Russian office to coordinate with the animators. He noted that Blizzard had been unable to convey its directions remotely, and that "the art improved [after the visit], though it still had a ways to go before reaching Blizzard quality." Didier and Metzen continued to put long hours into managing the Russian team through early 1997; in Neilson's view, the project began "taking a lot longer than expected." Later that year, Roper reported that Blizzard felt the art was coming out well.

Warcraft Adventures was initially set for a 1997 holiday shopping season release for Windows 95 and Mac OS, and was Blizzard's second title planned for that year, alongside StarCraft. According to Neilson, Warcraft Adventures was growing close to completion around August 1997, but Blizzard was unsatisfied with the results. He saw StarCraft, which had just undergone a redesign, as the higher-quality project at that time. Neilson wrote, "The prevailing opinion was that the game wasn't as fun as the adventure games we had all come to know and love. Beyond that, however, even the adventure games of that time were moving to 3D." Meetings were held about reworking the game. Late in August, PC Gamer US reported that Warcraft Adventures had been delayed until "the first half" of the following year. Reasons given publicly for the delay included the creation of new cutscenes to replace the ones already in the game, and the introduction of unannounced features. Combined with the delay of StarCraft, the setbacks to Warcraft Adventures were troubling to Blizzard, as they resulted in no flagship titles being launched in 1997.

=== Redesign by Steve Meretzky ===
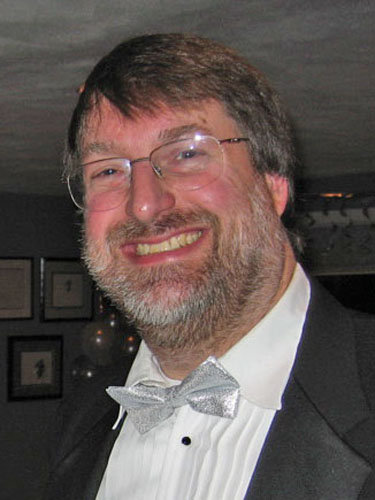
Blizzard Entertainment hired game designer Steve Meretzky to rework Warcraft Adventures before its cancellation.

Hoping to bring Warcraft Adventures up to company standards, Blizzard Entertainment contracted adventure game designer Steve Meretzky as a consultant in early 1998. Meretzky had created Infocom titles such as The Hitchhiker's Guide to the Galaxy and Planetfall, and had recently released The Space Bar with Boffo Games. Blizzard saw him as an expert in the genre, who could correct any mistakes that the team had made due to inexperience. By the time Meretzky was hired, Warcraft Adventures had reached the alpha stage and was almost finished. Voice recording and most of the visuals were complete, and the game could be played from beginning to end, albeit with software bugs. According to Meretzky, the results were seen internally at Blizzard as "good, but not great", and he personally felt that the game's "art was not terrific and the design was only adequate."

Meretzky spent a week at Blizzard's Irvine headquarters in mid-February 1998, during the final crunch period for StarCraft. The goal of his visit was to review the entirety of Warcraft Adventures in detail, and to help the team improve the game with minimal changes to the art and story already created. Bill Roper later said that the game had cost "a decent chunk of change", and was "under serious time and budget constraints" that precluded a heavy redesign. Discussing Meretzky's involvement publicly at the time, Susan Wooley of Blizzard stated that the company "wanted to make sure we weren't getting too close" to Warcraft Adventures. Meretzky proceeded to work 10- to 14-hour days alongside the team, and collaborated with Roper and Chris Metzen on a revised plan for the game, including dialogue and gameplay additions and a total overhaul of the user interface. The plan also entailed edits to the game's puzzles, and the creation of certain new art assets. Meretzky said that he and the team "moved some scenes around and added a little bit and tried to be surgical", to avoid heavy increases in budget and development time.

After his week at Blizzard's main office, Meretzky returned to Massachusetts and finished the job remotely. His time on Warcraft Adventures ultimately totaled around two weeks. Soon after his visit, Wooley reported that Blizzard had enjoyed its work with him and might hire him again. Roper later echoed this praise for Meretzky's contributions, which he said left the game with "a much, much stronger series of puzzles that tied in much better to the storyline." In 2016, Meretzky stated that even the planned revisions to Warcraft Adventures would have resulted in an average adventure game. However, he enjoyed the title's story and voice acting, and its core idea of rendering the Warcraft universe in finer and more intimate detail. Despite Meretzky's redesign, Blizzard did not initially project a delay for the game, which remained set for a summer 1998 launch.

=== Cancellation ===
"You could basically play it from beginning to end [...] But we thought the gameplay was too linear. We had done a bunch of puzzle changes that had yet to be implemented. People were asking 'This looks really good, but what about WarCraft Adventures will make it a Blizzard title?' "

— Producer Bill Roper on the final months of Warcraft Adventures' development

Following the conclusion of Steve Meretzky's work, Blizzard continued to develop Warcraft Adventures for roughly three months. By mid-March 1998, its release date had been pushed back to fall; it soon slipped to winter. However, most of Meretzky's redesign ultimately was not used in the game. As the team prepared a software build for the 1998 Electronic Entertainment Expo (E3), the "Strike Team" overseeing Warcraft Adventures convened to assess the project. By this time, the game was in direct competition with the visually superior The Curse of Monkey Island, and LucasArts had begun to show off its upcoming 3D adventure Grim Fandango. As a result, Warcraft Adventures appeared technologically dated. In addition, the team estimated that implementing Meretzky's plan would require another half-year of work. Roper believed that improving the game to Blizzard's expected level of quality meant "starting over", and that a delay into 1999 was possible. In 2001, Blizzard's Mike Morhaime placed internal estimates at 9–12 months of added development time before Warcraft Adventures would have been brought to standard.

As a result of the review, the "Strike Team" opted to end development of Warcraft Adventures, which Roper called the "best [option] for our brand and the WarCraft license." The cancellation meeting contained around five senior members. According to Roper, the choice was difficult but was reached collectively, and came as a relief to a team that had been "desperately trying to will this [game] into being". Because the decision arrived just before Warcraft Adventures' scheduled appearance at E3, the game's designated booth space was replaced with kiosks for StarCraft. On May 22, 1998, Warcraft Adventures was publicly cancelled, after roughly 18 months of development. At the time, GameSpot's Ron Dulin and Curt Feldman called this event "the beginning of a trend" at the developer, citing its 1996 cancellation of Pax Imperia 2 for failing to meet internal quality standards.

In retrospect, Roper considered Blizzard's conservative design plan for Warcraft Adventures to be its greatest mistake, and called it "the only thing I would have changed". He felt that the company's lack of forward thinking on the project left it outpaced by more ambitious games like Grim Fandango. Following the game's cancellation, he told GameSpot,

"I think that one of the big problems with Warcraft Adventures was that we were actually creating a traditional adventure game, and what people expected from an adventure game, and very honestly what we expected from an adventure game, changed over the course of the project. And when we got to the point where we cancelled it, it was just because we looked at where we were and said, you know, this would have been great three years ago."

== Reception ==
=== Pre-release ===
The announcement of Warcraft Adventures came as a surprise to the game industry, according to Colin Williamson of PC Gamer US, whose own publication had initially been skeptical of Blizzard Entertainment's ability to develop a graphic adventure. In mid-1997, Computer Games Strategy Plus described it as "perhaps the most surprising game of the year". However, excitement grew high for the game among players and journalists; Williamson felt that it could rival LucasArts' adventures. It was the cover story for PC Gamer US's June 1997 issue, and appeared at E3 1997 in CUC Software's display within the Inforum center, where the press highlighted Warcraft Adventures' "beautiful cel-based animation" and "Disneyesque graphics, smooth scrolling environments, and rich story and humor." A writer for Computer Gaming World remarked of the showing, "They've conquered the strategy and RPG genres, and now the Blizzard wunderkinds are taking on adventure games in their newest title—and only a fool would bet against them."

By 1997, concern was rising inside the game industry that the adventure genre was in danger of dying out, an issue of which Blizzard was aware. At the time, Todd Vaughn of PC Gamer US and Cindy Yans of Computer Games Strategy Plus both wrote that high-quality "traditional adventures" were growing rare, while CNET Gamecenter's Jeffrey Adam Young found that the genre had been flooded by "duds" such as Timelapse, Normality and Broken Sword: The Shadow of the Templars. However, a similar decline had been noted among computer role-playing games before the release of Blizzard's Diablo, which had become a mainstream hit in that genre. Discussing Warcraft Adventures in this context, Bill Roper argued that "everyone claimed RPGs were dead, but they were dead only because developers weren't doing enough with them, and people got bored and moved on to something else." Vaughn, Young and Yans all cited Warcraft Adventures as a game that could re-energize the graphic adventure genre, and Yans remarked in August 1997 that Blizzard had considered and dismissed the theory that the field was in decline. During his talk "Are Adventure Games Dead?" at the May 1998 Computer Game Developers Conference, Steve Meretzky likewise called Warcraft Adventures a "particularly encouraging sign" for the genre, given Blizzard's track record of commercial success.

=== Response to cancellation ===
The cancellation of Warcraft Adventures was met with widespread disappointment from players, to a degree that Blizzard Entertainment did not anticipate. By that time, the company believed that the audience for adventure games had shrunk; citing poor sales of The Curse of Monkey Island, Mike Morhaime later noted that adventures with 2D graphics had been "aging fast" as a genre. Bill Roper remarked, "I think that one of the bigger shocks was [finding] that people would be interested in it at all." He considered the blowback to be a strong vote of confidence in the Warcraft license. Following the cancellation of Warcraft Adventures, fans Philipp Schneider and Christian Giegerich created an online petition to support the project's revival, which garnered 1,737 signatures by August 1998. After they sent the results to Blizzard, the company responded on August 19 by thanking its audience but reaffirming its decision to cancel the game. In an open letter, Blizzard stated,

"It was a hard call to make, but each of us knows that it was the right choice. The cancellation was not a business or marketing decision or even a statement about the adventure genre. The decision centered around the level of value that we want to give our customers. In essence, it was a case of stepping up and really proving to ourselves and gamers that we will not sell out on the quality of our games."

At the time, Jeff Green of Computer Gaming World wrote that Warcraft Adventures' cancellation "hit [him] hard" and was his "Bummer of the Year". The magazine's Terry Coleman called it a sign that Blizzard had lost its independent status, and theorized that corporate pressure had played a role in the decision. This view was later echoed by Alex Cachinero-Gorman of Hardcore Gaming 101, who cited statements by Mike Morhaime as evidence that the cancellation was "as much a numbers game as anything about game quality", and that "the prospect of a lost investment did not motivate them to apply their characteristic rigor". Conversely, Steve Meretzky said in 2016 that the cancellation "made me sad at the time", but that Warcraft Adventures' relatively low quality meant that Blizzard had taken the best route. In retrospect, Amer Ajami of GameSpot opined that the game's cancellation arguably marked "the death knell" of the adventure game genre as a whole.

Around two months after Warcraft Adventures was canceled, a group of ten Blizzard employees quit the company to form a new studio. Among them was James Phinney, a key figure on StarCraft. According to Blizzard's Micky Neilson, several factors—including the scandal at Blizzard parent Cendant—caused this event. However, he noted that "for some the cancellation of Warcraft Adventures was the final straw."

== Legacy ==
Following the end of Warcraft Adventures' development, Blizzard Entertainment publicly clarified that it would revisit the Warcraft universe in the future. In May 1999, the company announced an impending agreement with an unnamed publisher to release three Warcraft novels, alongside novelizations of StarCraft and Diablo. The deal was ultimately signed with Pocket Books. Early in the development process for the Warcraft book trilogy, Bill Roper hinted that Warcraft Adventures' story could reappear in one of the novels. This resulted in Warcraft: Lord of the Clans in October 2001, written by Christie Golden and intended to set the stage for Warcraft III. The book is considered canonical. According to Golden, "Chris Metzen liked the story line and wanted to see it live in some format." Receiving the assignment after its first author had failed to finish it, Golden was given a six-week deadline for Lord of the Clans, based on a modified version of Metzen's original plot outline from the game. She proceeded to write several other novels for Blizzard because of her enjoyment of this project, among them World of Warcraft: Arthas: Rise of the Lich King, the company's first New York Times Best Seller. Blizzard hired her to a full-time position at the company in 2017.

In August 1998, Roper confirmed that Blizzard planned to complete the animated cutscenes for Warcraft Adventures, as they could help Blizzard sell film and television studios on the idea of adapting the property. He remarked, "It's one thing to have a bunch of cool stills, and it's another thing to have a fifteen-minute short to show them." While this plan was shelved, the Warcraft Adventures story proceeded to inspire much of the later Warcraft franchise. When the game was first announced in early 1997, speculation arose that Blizzard planned to follow it with the real-time strategy game Warcraft III, which the company confirmed a few months later. Intended from the start to build upon the events of Warcraft Adventures, Warcraft III ultimately continued the story of Thrall, and takes place after his reunification of the Horde and defeat of its human captors. Thrall continued to play a major part in the MMORPG World of Warcraft, and his father Durotan, also created for Warcraft Adventures, featured in the 2016 film Warcraft. Wes Fenlon of PC Gamer US wrote in 2016, "Few canceled games can claim to have as much impact as Lord of the Clans, and in the end it seems like Thrall was more valuable than the game itself."

In 2017, Alex Cachinero-Gorman wrote that Warcraft Adventures "spawn[ed] wistful retrospectives every few years". PC Gamer US named it one of the "Greatest Games (Never Made)" in 1998, and included it in a list of the "10 Cancelled PC Games We Still Want To Play" in 2011. Its development was also the subject of a long "PC Gaming Graveyard" feature by GameSpot, the site's first in this series. However, in response to questions about the game's revival in 2009, Samwise Didier remarked, "DVDs are really popular because of deleted scenes, but when you watch them you can see why they weren't included in the movie. That's what Warcraft Adventures is." The cancellation of Warcraft Adventures is often cited as an example of Blizzard's "willingness to cancel a game late in development to protect the quality of their brand", according to Cachinero-Gorman. It was among a years-long string of cancellations at Blizzard, including Pax Imperia 2, Shattered Nations, Crixa, Nomad and StarCraft: Ghost, alongside the Titan project canceled in 2014 after roughly seven years' development. Calling this trend the key to Blizzard's success in 2016, Kat Bailey of USgamer regarded Warcraft Adventures' cancellation a wise choice for Blizzard's brand, as otherwise "it might still be an object of ridicule today."

=== Leaks and reaction ===
"The game code that was leaked is a really fascinating slice of time in the history of Blizzard game development, but it's not where we were taking the game in terms of puzzles and story if we would have pushed it to completion as opposed to canceling it".

— Producer Bill Roper on the leaked version of Warcraft Adventures

A Russian fan under the pseudonym "MAN-Biker" leaked under two minutes of gameplay footage of a Warcraft Adventures alpha version via a YouTube video in 2010, and a beginning-to-end longplay of a beta version in 2011, without cutscenes. According to PC Gamer US, he had received his copy from a Russian game developer in the late 2000s, although this developer had not personally worked on Warcraft Adventures.

A complete, playable Warcraft Adventures, including its cutscenes, was leaked onto the Scrolls of Lore Warcraft fansite by a Russian fan under the screen name "Reidor" on September 9, 2016. Reidor told PC Gamer US that he had been sent the files by an unnamed third party. Soon after, the version shown in MAN-Biker's videos was leaked as well. Chris Higgins of PCGamesN speculated that these copies of the game derived from employees at Animation Magic's Russian office. Blizzard responded with takedown notices to Reidor and peer-to-peer file sharing websites that hosted the game, but Wes Fenlon remarked, "By then, of course, it was too late."

Reviewing the leaked version, Fenlon called Warcraft Adventures "a conventional, borderline dull point-and-click adventure" that fails to capitalize on its roots in the Warcraft series. Richard Cobbett of Rock Paper Shotgun concurred on both points, and concluded, "It's not a terrible adventure, but there's no point in the 90s when it would have been a great one." However, both writers praised the game's visuals, particularly in comparison to Animation Magic's efforts on Link: The Faces of Evil and Zelda: The Wand of Gamelon. Alex Cachinero-Gorman offered a mixed opinion on the art, and criticized the game's use of noble savage characters and references to Native American life, which he considered shallow and "nauseating". However, he broke with Cobbett and Fenlon on the game's overall quality: in his view, Warcraft Adventures is "far from boring" and possibly "the most polished game ever to be canceled."
