= Gul'dan =

Fictional character in the Warcraft franchise

- Warcraft character
- Artwork of Gul'dan by Chris Metzen
- First appearance: Warcraft II: Tides of Darkness (1995)
- Portrayed by: Daniel Wu
- Voiced by: Paul Eiding; Troy Baker (World of Warcraft)

In-universe information
- Species: Orc
- Class: Warlock

Gul'dan is a fictional character in Blizzard Entertainment's Warcraft media franchise. He is an orc warlock and one of the franchise's recurring antagonists. Introduced in Warcraft II: Tides of Darkness, Gul'dan is depicted as a power-hungry sorcerer whose actions help corrupt the orcs, create the Shadow Council, and set the Horde on its path of conquest.

The character later appears through his legacy in Warcraft III: Reign of Chaos and Warcraft III: The Frozen Throne. An alternate-timeline incarnation serves as a major antagonist in World of Warcraft: Warlords of Draenor and World of Warcraft: Legion. Gul'dan also appears as a playable character in Hearthstone and Heroes of the Storm.

Gul'dan was adapted as the principal antagonist of the 2016 live-action film Warcraft, in which he was portrayed by Daniel Wu. Commentary about the character has focused on his pursuit of power without a claimed moral justification, his foundational role in the political and occult structures of the Horde, and the adaptation of his characterization across games and film.

== Concept and development ==
Gul'dan first appeared in Warcraft II: Tides of Darkness, in which he was presented as a treacherous orc warlock whose pursuit of power undermines The Horde during the Second War. His role connected the Horde's military campaign with the demonic forces behind the wider Warcraft setting. The character's origins were subsequently expanded in games and tie-in fiction.

World of Warcraft: Warlords of Draenor revisited the character through an alternate timeline in which the orcs initially avoid the demonic corruption associated with Gul'dan. This version as an important but constrained figure whose knowledge of the original course of events made him useful to both Garrosh Hellscream and the Burning Legion.

Gul'dan was carried from Warlords of Draenor into World of Warcraft: Legion, where he was used as an instrument of the Burning Legion's invasion of Azeroth. Before the expansion's release, Blizzard produced an animated short about Gul'dan as part of its Harbingers series, which serves as an origin story explaining the character's rejection as an outcast by his clan and his subsequent acceptance of demonic power.

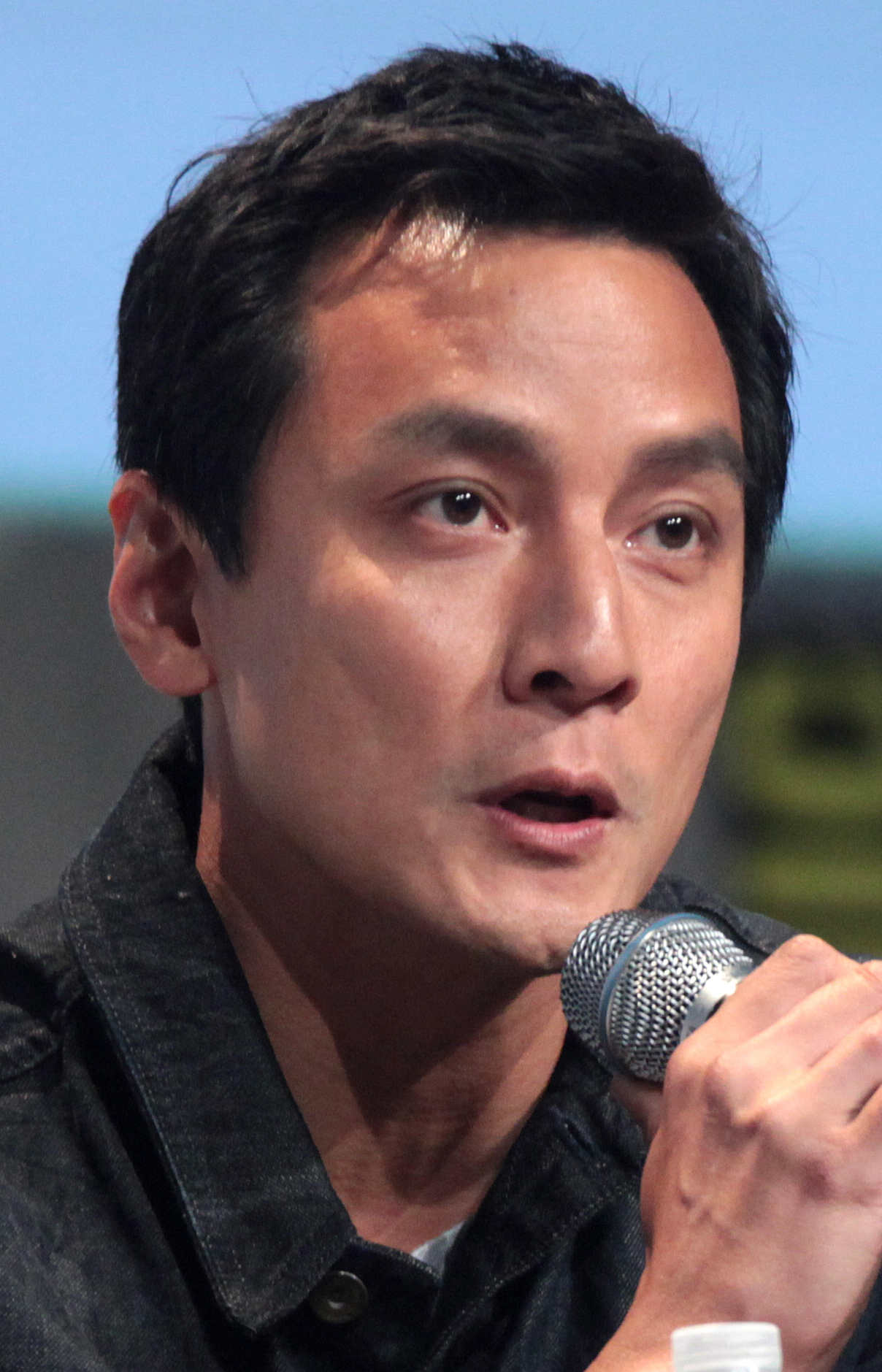
Daniel Wu portrayed Gul'dan in the 2016 film adaptation.

Daniel Wu was cast as Gul'dan for the 2016 live-action film Warcraft. Wu performed the character through voice acting and motion capture. He said that his wife, who played Warcraft, encouraged him to audition despite his original intention to take time away from acting following the birth of their daughter. Director Duncan Jones advised Wu not to become constrained by the character's extensive game continuity and instead to construct a motivation that would work within the film. Wu interpreted Gul'dan as believing that his actions were necessary to ensure the survival of the orcs, notwithstanding the destructive effects of his magic. He considered that conviction important to avoiding a wholly one-dimensional portrayal. Practical sets and physical effects were also used during the motion-capture production to give Wu objects and environmental elements with which to interact.

== Appearances ==
=== Warcraft video games ===
Gul'dan first appears in Warcraft II: Tides of Darkness. During the Second War, he ostensibly serves the Horde while secretly pursuing his own objectives. He creates the first death knights for Orgrim Doomhammer but later abandons the Horde to search for the Tomb of Sargeras. His departure weakens the Horde and contributes to its defeat. Gul'dan is killed inside the tomb, although his skull remains as a powerful demonic artefact.

Although Gul'dan is dead by the events of Warcraft III: Reign of Chaos, his legacy remains important. During the night elf campaign, Illidan Stormrage consumes the power contained in the Skull of Gul'dan, transforming himself into a demonic form while fighting the Burning Legion.

An alternate version of Gul'dan appears in World of Warcraft: Warlords of Draenor. In the expansion, Garrosh Hellscream travels to an alternate Draenor and prevents the orcs from accepting the blood of Mannoroth. Gul'dan is imprisoned and used to power the Dark Portal, but later resumes his service to the Burning Legion. Following the defeat of several Iron Horde leaders, he takes control of its remnants and summons Archimonde at Hellfire Citadel. Archimonde's defeat sends Gul'dan into the main timeline's Azeroth, setting up the events of World of Warcraft: Legion.

In World of Warcraft: Legion, Gul'dan opens the Tomb of Sargeras and helps initiate the Burning Legion's invasion of Azeroth. PC Gamer reported that the expansion's cinematic presentation established Gul'dan as largely responsible for the invasion and identified him as an eventual raid opponent in Suramar Palace. Gul'dan later attempts to use Illidan Stormrage's body as a vessel for Sargeras, but is defeated in the Nighthold raid and killed by the restored Illidan. A hidden sequence in the Tomb of Sargeras raid allows one player to collect a series of runes and transform temporarily into Gul'dan. The transformed player can use several of his abilities and attack members of their own raid group.

=== Other appearances ===
Gul'dan's early history is explored in World of Warcraft: Rise of the Horde. where he is portrayed as a former shaman who rejects spiritual restraint in favour of fel magic and manipulates the orc clans through the Shadow Council. His ambition and alliance with Kil'jaeden lead to the demonic corruption of the orcs and the creation of the Shadow Council.

In August 2014, Blizzard released the tie-in comic Gul'dan and the Stranger, written by Micky Neilson and illustrated by Alex Horley, to explain Gul'dan's role in the altered history that produced the Iron Horde.

Gul'dan appears in Hearthstone as the original hero representing the Warlock class. His hero power, Life Tap, allows the player to exchange health for additional cards. A character and lore feature published by Dot Esports argued that this risk-and-reward design reflected Gul'dan's established willingness to sacrifice others and ultimately himself in exchange for power.

A later version, Bloodreaver Gul'dan, was introduced as a Warlock hero card. The card replaces the player's hero power and summons friendly demons that had previously died during the match. Dot Esports credited Bloodreaver Gul'dan, together with other cards, with helping Control Warlock decks return to competitive prominence during the Kobolds and Catacombs metagame.

Gul'dan was added as a playable character to Heroes of the Storm in 2016, initially through the game's public test realm. He is designed as a ranged spellcasting assassin whose abilities draw upon fel magic, life-draining attacks and the exchange of health for mana through Life Tap. PC Gamer noted that balance changes subsequently established him as a sustained-damage character rather than one centred on short bursts of damage.

Gul'dan appears as the principal antagonist of the 2016 live-action film Warcraft. In the film, he uses fel magic to unite the orc clans and transports the Horde from the dying world of Draenor to Azeroth through a portal powered by the life force of prisoners. His use of fel magic has poisoned Draenor and changed the orcs who submit to it. He is opposed by Durotan, who concludes that Gul'dan's magic threatens the survival of the orcs as well as their new world. Wu portrayed Gul'dan through voice acting and motion capture.

== Reception ==
Gul'dan has been discussed as one of the central antagonists of the Warcraft franchise. In a 2007 retrospective, Matthew Rossi of Engadget distinguished Gul'dan from villains who were corrupted against their will or believed themselves to be serving a greater cause. Rossi argued that Gul'dan knowingly betrayed the orcs and accepted their corruption because he valued personal power above their survival. Rossi's commentary has also focused on Gul'dan's role in defining the Horde as an institution and one of his central creations alongside the Shadow Council. The Horde provided the public military organisation necessary to unite the orc clans, while the Shadow Council allowed Gul'dan to control its political and occult power from behind the nominal leadership of Blackhand. Rossi further argued that Gul'dan's influence survived him through a recurring willingness within the Horde to pursue victory regardless of its cost.

Anne Stickney, also writingn for Engadget expanded upon Rossi's interpretation in a dedicated profile of the character. She described Gul'dan as unusually dangerous not merely because of his magical abilities, but because of his intelligence, patience and lack of moral restraint. Stickney argued that he understood the consequences of Kil'jaeden's deception yet chose to expose the orcs to demonic corruption because doing so displaced Ner'zhul and increased Gul'dan's own power. She also identified his manipulation of Blackhand and creation of the Shadow Council as evidence that he preferred to exercise power through concealed political structures.

William Sims Bainbridge discussed Gul'dan in The Warcraft Civilization as part of an analysis of religion and magic in World of Warcraft. Bainbridge used Gul'dan to contrast traditional orc shamanism with warlock magic, describing his desire for power independent of the elements and his creation of an elite group of former shamans who renounced their earlier roles to become warlocks. Bonnie Nardi similarly referred to Gul'dan and the Shadow Council while examining the depth of World of Warcraft's textual backstory. She observed, however, that much of this history is contained outside the ordinary activities directly experienced by players during gameplay.

The character's complicated chronology has itself attracted comment. In discussing Hearthstone's Book of Heroes, Polygon used Gul'dan as an example of the difficulty of presenting the Warcraft cast to newer players: the original incarnation had been dead for much of the franchise, while an alternate version had returned as a central antagonist. The publication argued that the anthology format gave Blizzard an opportunity to reintroduce characters whose histories had become dispersed across games, expansions and alternate timelines.

Gul'dan's use as a boss encounter also received coverage. Nathan Grayson of Kotaku described him as one of World of Warcraft's toughest raid bosses and considered his appearance in the Nighthold to be a major event because of his importance to the franchise's history. Steven Messner of PC Gamer likewise described Gul'dan as a famed warlock and one of the expansion's most difficult raid encounters when reporting that a player had defeated him alone. Rich Stanton later recalled Gul'dan as the kind of final boss who had once made experienced raid groups anxious, using him to illustrate the satisfaction players derived from returning at higher levels to defeat formerly difficult bosses.

The adaptation of Gul'dan's characterization into gameplay outside of the Warcraft series has also been noted. Dot Esports considered the health-sacrificing mechanics of the Warlock class in Hearthstone to be an effective translation of Gul'dan's established characterization, because both reward the acquisition of power through dangerous or destructive exchanges. PC Gamer similarly described his Heroes of the Storm incarnation as retaining the character's association with fel magic and life-draining abilities while converting those qualities into resource-management mechanics.

Wu's casting in the film adaptation was treated by media outlets as significant for Chinese and other Asian audiences. Kotaku noted his prominence as a film actor in Asia and the attention his casting brought to the production. Vanity Fair later argued that Wu's presence contributed to the film's commercial appeal in China, even though the motion-capture design made him largely unrecognisable in the role.

== Legal issues ==
Gul'dan was among the Warcraft characters identified in a 2019 copyright infringement lawsuit filed by Blizzard against the companies behind the mobile and web game Glorious Saga. Blizzard alleged that the game copied its characters and other assets, retaining names including Gul'dan, Jaina Proudmoore and Malfurion. Glorious Saga was taken offline shortly after the lawsuit was filed, although its publisher did not state that the closure resulted from the proceedings.
