= Trolls in Warcraft =

Fictional species in the Warcraft franchise

Trolls
- Warcraft race
- Renders of in-game character models for World of Warcraft depicting a typical male (left) and female (right) Darkspear troll respectively.
- First appearance: Warcraft II: Tides of Darkness (1995)
- Created by: Blizzard Entertainment

In-universe information
- Home world: Azeroth
- Type: Humanoid
- Distinctions: Tusks, two-toed feet

Trolls are a fictional species of tusked humanoids in Blizzard Entertainment's Warcraft franchise. First introduced as in-game units in the real-time strategy game Warcraft II: Tides of Darkness, trolls in Warcraft include several humanoid peoples with distinct cultures and political allegiances. The Darkspear trolls ally with the Horde in Warcraft III: Reign of Chaos and became one of the original playable races of World of Warcraft. Other troll peoples appear as opponents, while the Zandalari became playable as of Battle for Azeroth. Trolls also feature in Hearthstone, including its expansion Rastakhan's Rumble.

Blizzard developed the Darkspear as a jungle troll tribe attempting to change its ways in Warcraft III, distinguishing them from other jungle trolls when making them playable in World of Warcraft. Later development included updated models for Darkspear characters as well as the introduction of the Zandalari cultural origin, clothing and equipment drawing on Pre-Columbian era Mesoamerican cultures. For Midnight, the developers sought to expand the Amani beyond their earlier appearances as enemies and depict members of the group as heroes.

Scholars and critics have identified Black Caribbean, particularly Jamican, coding in the early Darkspear portrayal, including their speech, appearance, music and references to Vodou. Their analyses discuss colonial stereotypes, the association of Black identity with savagery, and the treatment of religious traditions. Commentary on female troll designs has examined sexual dimorphism and representations of Black Caribbean women, while ethnographic research has considered female troll avatars in relation to queer identification and desire. Research on the Brazilian Portuguese localization has also examined how players associate troll speech with regional identities and social stereotypes.

== Concept and development ==
Trolls first appeared in Warcraft II: Tides of Darkness. Artist Samwise Didier recalled that the sequel broadened the armies beyond the orcs and humans of the first game. Rather than making every Horde soldier an orc, the team assigned different roles to other fantasy peoples, including trolls.

In a 2003 interview for Blizzard Insider, creative director Chris Metzen attributed the decision to make trolls playable in World of Warcraft to the developers' affection for them and their existing role in the Horde's story. He distinguished the Darkspear, a jungle-troll tribe introduced in the Warcraft III demo, from other troll groups. Metzen described the jungle trolls as evil, but said the Darkspear were trying to change. Metzen said that trolls would share the orcs' starting area, with troll inhabitants and a nearby village intended to give players a stronger presence within the orc homeland.

In its account of the Italian localization, Blizzard said that the team used Neapolitan as the basis for troll speech. The company attributed the choice to perceived parallels between troll culture and Neapolitan traditions concerning ancestry, superstition and streetwise behavior.

During the 2014 update of the male and female troll models, senior art director Chris Robinson described the difficulty of adapting facial models and animations to the different tusk options.

At BlizzCon 2017, senior character artist Christopher Chang described a new approach to the Zandalari for Battle for Azeroth. Their environment, clothing and equipment drew heavily on Aztec and Maya cultures, with gold and elaborate carvings used on armor and weapons. Prop artist Ashleigh Warner described revisiting earlier Zandalari designs and combining these influences with dinosaur imagery.

For Midnight, game designer Jake Shillan described expanding the Amani beyond their earlier portrayal as enemies in Zul'Aman. Lead quest designer Rachel Bott said that the expansion provided an opportunity to show the Amani as heroes, with leaders who disagreed over how to protect their people.

== Depiction ==
Trolls are depicted as humanoids with tusks and two-toed feet; early playable models have blue or green skin. The franchise distinguishes several groups, including forest, jungle, desert and ice trolls. In Warcraft II, troll axethrowers serve as ranged troops in the orcish Horde.

The Darkspear are jungle trolls who ally with the orc leader Thrall during Warcraft III and follow the Horde to Kalimdor. Darkspear trolls are one of the original game's eight playable races, and belong to the Horde alongside orcs, tauren and the undead. Their background in World of Warcraft describes a people displaced by other troll tribes, who establish a settlement on the Echo Isles off the coast of Durotar.

The Amani forest trolls led by Zul'jin, who were once aligned with the Horde during the events of Warcraft II, oppose the elven civilizations centered in Quel'thalas. Their stronghold, Zul'Aman, a combat encounter for groups of players or "raid", in World of Warcraft: The Burning Crusade.

The Zandalari and their homeland, Zandalar, were developed further for Battle for Azeroth. Zandalari trolls became playable in the expansion's March 2019 content update. Their culture includes the worship of loa, spirits venerated by trolls, and the use of dinosaurs as mounts.

World of Warcraft: Chronicle describes dark trolls being transformed into night elves by the magical Well of Eternity, a connection earlier material presented as a disputed theory. A 2026 Midnight storyline introduced a claim by the haranir people that trolls and elves share common ancestry. Quest designer Keith Riley clarified that this account represented the haranir's understanding of their history, rather than Blizzard's definitive genealogy.

Trolls are also the focus of the 2018 Hearthstone expansion Rastakhan's Rumble. It depicts a tournament in which troll champions lead teams under the patronage of loa.

== Reception and analysis ==
=== Racial and religious representation ===
Jessica Langer's analysis of early World of Warcraft identifies Black Caribbean, particularly Jamaican, cultural coding in troll speech and appearance. She also associates Sen'jin Village's music, thatched huts and ritual masks with Caribbean imagery, and discusses references to Vodou in dialogue and quests. She places these depictions within a history of Western representations that ridicule the religion. G. Willow Wilson argues that the game's sympathetic treatment of formerly monstrous peoples can reproduce the stereotype of the noble savage. She cites the trolls' Afro-Caribbean accents, cannibalism and voodoo jokes, and skull-decorated villages.

In Wired, Clive Thompson discussed the trolls' Jamaican accents and reported an analysis of the game's prewritten emotes by Beth Cox, supervised by Aaron Delwiche. According to Delwiche, Cox found that trolls were more likely than other races to make violent or sexual statements. Steven Tuttle and J. Talmadge Wright examine the language of the trolls' official racial profile, their Jamaican accents and their association with savagery. They question why characters they read as Black are singled out as savage in a game where players routinely fight demons and dragons. They connect this characterization to American media stereotypes of Black people, particularly men, as violent or criminal, and draw on Langer's discussion of the disparagement of Vodou.

Christopher Douglas uses troll religion in his criticism of the game's treatment of race and culture. He argues that World of Warcraft treats cultural identity as an inherited racial property rather than something learned. Douglas contrasts its use of popular stereotypes of Vodou with the specific references to Ernest Hemingway in a hunting quest sequence.

Writing in PC Gamer, Leana Hafer criticizes the Darkspear's exaggerated Jamaican speech and discusses the Zandalari's borrowing from Indigenous American cultures. She objects to their gods sharing the name of the spirits of Vodou, comparing this with the hypothetical adaptation of Jesus Christ into the humans' religion. In her view, these portrayals extend less respect to non-Abrahamic traditions and can imply that the cultures being represented are less human.

=== Gender and sexuality ===
In an analysis of sexual dimorphism reported by Annalee Newitz in Wired, Andrea Rubenstein contrasts male trolls' large tusks and posture with females' much smaller tusks and different posture. Newitz criticizes the limited options for female bodies and the application of a slender feminine ideal to fantasy creatures. Langer examines jokes about female trolls' appearance and male trolls' sexual preferences. She argues that the women are presented as both unattractive and hypersexualized, with dances resembling Jamaican dancehall. She relates this combination to colonial representations of Black Caribbean women.

In her ethnographic study of queer play, Jenny Sundén describes female trolls as performing a rough-edged, relaxed femininity with rebellious undertones. She discusses their husky laughter, dancing and boastful flirtation, and her own attachment to a female troll character. Although she does not regard female trolls as conventional beauties, Sundén finds her own character attractive and describes her proud bearing. She considers attachment to one's own and other players' characters an important part of play, involving both identification and desire.

=== Language and localization ===
Heber de Oliveira Costa e Silva examines players' responses to troll speech in the Brazilian Portuguese localization. In the forum comments he analyzes, players associate the trolls with regional and social identities, including those of Bahia and Rio de Janeiro. Silva identifies references to capoeira and Olodum among the Bahian associations, and prejudiced assumptions about slang, weapons and allegedly incorrect speech among the responses to a perceived Rio accent. He observes that comments associate trolls with cunning and deceit, although the game assigns that role to goblins. His analysis relates praise and criticism of the localization to players' expectations about the identities and behavior of the fictional races.
