= Warcraft II: Beyond the Dark Portal =

1996 video game

- Developers: Blizzard Entertainment; Cyberlore Studios
- Publisher: Blizzard Entertainment
- Designers: Jim DuBois; Jesse King; Joseph Minton; Rob Caswell
- Programmer: Ken Grey
- Artists: Peter Lawson; Seth Spaulding
- Series: Warcraft
- Platforms: Macintosh, MS-DOS, PlayStation, Sega Saturn, Microsoft Windows
- Release: Windows, Mac OS: NA: May 16, 1996; EU: 1996; PlayStation, Saturn: NA/EU: August 20, 1997
- Genre: Real-time strategy
- Modes: Single-player, multiplayer

Warcraft II: Beyond the Dark Portal is an expansion pack for the real-time strategy video game Warcraft II: Tides of Darkness for Macintosh, MS-DOS, and Microsoft Windows. It was developed by Blizzard Entertainment and Cyberlore Studios, and published by Blizzard in North America and Europe in 1996. It requires the full version of the original game to run and adds new story campaigns and multiplayer maps. The expansion was later released alongside Tides of Darkness for the PlayStation and Sega Saturn in 1997 as Warcraft II: The Dark Saga, and was included in the Warcraft II: Battle.net Edition for Windows PC and Macintosh in 1999.

== Story ==
The plot of Beyond the Dark Portal takes place after the events of Warcraft II: Tides of Darkness. The orcs, now under the leadership of the shaman Ner'zhul, staged a new invasion of Azeroth and overwhelmed the citadel of Nethergarde, which guarded the remnants of the portal. The Alliance itself had been splintered after the Second War and Gilneas and Stromgarde had withdrawn their support. The arch-mage Khadgar summoned heroes of Azeroth, Alleria, Danath Trollbane, Turalyon and Kurdran Wildhammer to rally the forces of the Alliance. The Horde was beaten back and Khadgar decided to take the initiative to push through the Portal into the Orcs' homeland. Before being pushed back, Ner'zhul managed to steal the spellbook of Medivh which was needed to create new Portals.

The Alliance gained a foothold and made preparations to seal the rift forever while the Orcs reorganized. Khadgar needed the spellbook of Medivh and the Skull of Gul'dan to accomplish it. They razed the Shadowmoon Citadel, seat of Ner'zhul's Shadow Council. While the Alliance army and navy only barely held out, Khadgar managed to acquire the items with help from the Laughing Skull Clan. Ner'zhul managed to open portals to the Twisting Nether and escaped through one of the new Portals. The violent energies began to destroy Draenor and also threatened Azeroth. Khadgar destroyed the Portal on the side of Draenor to prevent harm to Azeroth, trapping the remaining Alliance forces beyond the Dark Portal in the dying land of Draenor. Khadgar and the warriors of Azeroth then entered one of the portals not knowing where it would lead to avoid being killed by the violent rifts tearing the planet apart.

After the Second War, the Alliance loses the allegiance of the elves, who accuse the Alliance of not having done enough to defend their home as well as losing the allegiance of two Human kingdoms, which advocated exterminating the remaining Orcs rather than keeping them in captivity. One Orc clan that had fought in the Second War's final battle was unaccounted for. Although the Dark Portal had been destroyed, a tear in reality hovered over the ruin.

== New features ==
The expansion adds two new campaigns and several multiplayer maps. The expansion also adds a new swamp tileset for the world of Draenor.

The new campaigns feature ten new heroes for Warcraft, five for the Alliance and five for the Horde. Warcraft II: Tides of Darkness had a few hero units, but these units were only marginally stronger than their basic unit and they had their own unique sayings different from their non-hero counterparts. The new heroes have increased unit statistics, making them more powerful than regular units, have their own unit portraits, and their own speech. The Alliance heroes are Alleria (Ranger), Danath (Footman), Turalyon (Paladin), Khadgar (Mage) and Kurdran (Gryphon Rider on his mount Sky'ree). The Horde heroes are Grom Hellscream (Grunt), Kargath Bladefist (Grunt), Dentarg (Ogre-Mage), Teron Gorefiend (Death Knight) and Deathwing (Dragon). While regular units of the two armies are balanced (only the spells wielded by spellcasters differ), the heroes have greater distinctions. The Orcish heroes are more powerful than their human counterparts. The heroes are important to the story and may not be killed without resulting in the player's defeat during missions with exception of the final missions in both campaigns, and with the exception of Khadgar in the Human campaign and Teron in Orcish campaign (in the 11th mission).

The CD-ROM itself, when put into a CD player, will play the many different musical tracks from the game itself. In addition, there is a special track at the end of the disc that incorporates unit voices as well as lyrics to create a comical song entitled "I'm A Medieval Man". The song is a medieval parody or tribute song of the Command & Conquer song "Mechanical Man", which features voices as well alluding to the fact that Warcraft served as a primary competitor in real-time strategy games, the expansion being released only a year after Command & Conquer.

== Development ==
Following the successful release of the base game, Blizzard planned to focus development resources on StarCraft, their next real-time strategy game. As a result, they contracted the development of an expansion for Warcraft II: Tides of Darkness out to Cyberlore Studios. Following a milestone check-in, Blizzard deemed the project's execution subpar and cancelled their contract with Cyberlore, finishing the expansion pack themselves and releasing it in 1996. This experience led the company to prefer in-house development for future expansion packs.

Beyond the Dark Portal was included alongside the base game in the console release Warcraft II: The Dark Saga, published by Electronic Arts for the Sony PlayStation and Sega Saturn in 1997.

Blizzard's future titles all featured their online service Battle.net, used for multiplayer game hosting and matchmaking, which quickly became a large part of their success as their games grew online communities. As a result, they re-released Warcraft II in 1999, in a package that included the Beyond the Dark Portal expansion called Warcraft II: Battle.net Edition.

== Reception ==
Warcraft II: Beyond the Dark Portal (1996)

Aggregate score
| Aggregator | Score |
|---|---|
| GameRankings | 82% |

Review scores
| Publication | Score |
|---|---|
| Computer Gaming World | 4.5/5 |
| GameRevolution | 4/5 |
| GameSpot | 92% |
| All Game Guide | 4/5 |
| Arcane | 8/10 |

Warcraft II: Beyond the Dark Portal released to positive reviews from critics. Awarding the expansion a 9.2 out of 10, GameSpot's Ron Dulin summarized "Fans of Warcraft II are split along two fronts: there are the single-players and then there are the multi-players. But whichever side of the fence you lean toward, this is a must-have."

In its 146th issue, Computer Gaming World called the game "a must-buy for any Warcraft II fan." While pointing out the amount of content as not enough to satisfy, citing the lack of new units in particular, GameRevolution concluded that "On the whole, this is a good expansion set." All Game Guide awarded it 4 out of 5 stars, calling it "a worthwhile expansion to an incredible game."

Paul Pettengale reviewed Warcraft II: Beyond the Dark Portal for Arcane magazine, rating it an 8 out of 10 overall. Pettengale comments that "this is a bargain which all Warcraft ll owners should snap up."

== Sequel ==
In Warcraft III: Reign of Chaos it is learned that Ner'zhul was intercepted by agents of the Burning Legion and transformed into the Lich King. In Warcraft III: The Frozen Throne it is learned that parts of Draenor survived and are now called Outland. Remnants of the Alliance expedition appear in World of Warcraft: The Burning Crusade.

The black dragon Deathwing, who first appears in Beyond the Dark Portal as an ally of the orc Horde, later returns as the central antagonist of World of Warcraft: Cataclysm.
