= Chris Metzen =

American game designer (born 1973)

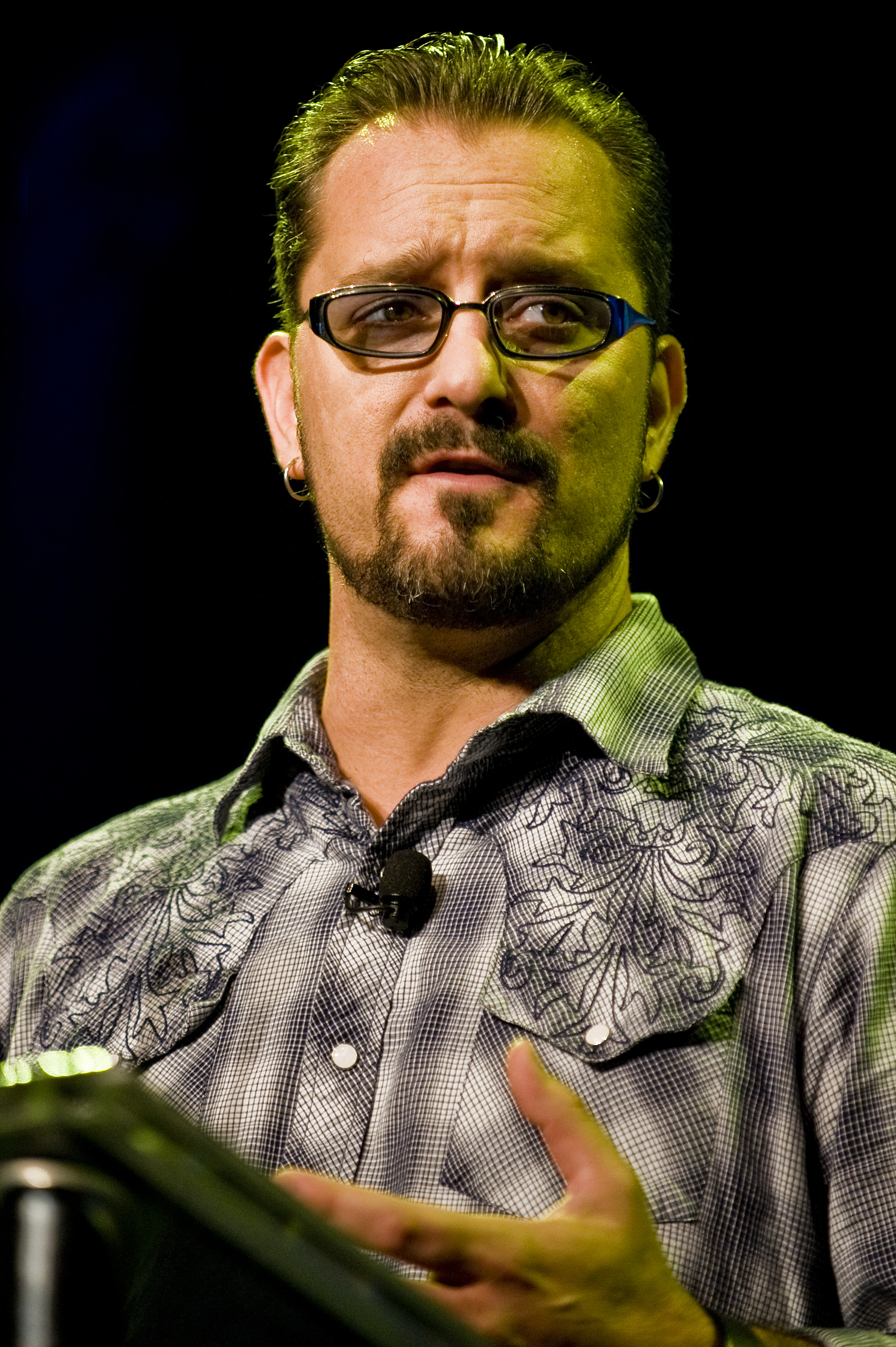
- Metzen at the 2009 BlizzCon
- Born: Christopher Vincent Metzen; November 22, 1973 (age 52)
- Occupations: Game designer; artist; author; voice actor
- Years active: 1993–2016; 2022–present
- Employer(s): Warchief Gaming; Blizzard Entertainment
- Title: Executive Creative Director
- Spouse: Kat Hunter (m. 2013)
- Children: 3

Christopher Vincent Metzen (born November 22, 1973) is an American game designer, artist, voice actor, and author known for his work creating the fictional universes and scripts for Blizzard Entertainment's three major award-winning media franchises: Warcraft, Diablo and StarCraft. Metzen was hired by Blizzard Entertainment as an animator and an artist; his first work for the company was with the video game Justice League Task Force.

Metzen was the Senior Vice President of Story and Franchise Development at Blizzard Entertainment and assisted the company's projects by providing voice talent for a number of characters, most notably the orc character Thrall, as well as contributing to artistic character design. Metzen retired in September 2016 to spend more time with his family, but returned to the company as a creative advisor in December 2022. He was made the executive creative director of Warcraft in September 2023.

In his most recent work, Metzen co-authored graphic novels, Transformers: Autocracy and Transformers Monstrosity with author Flint Dille and artist Livio Ramondelli.

== Career ==
Metzen began his career in design after applying to Blizzard Entertainment, then known as Chaos Studios, on the recommendation of a friend impressed by his napkin doodle of a dragon. He was quickly recruited by the company, although Metzen states that at the time he did not really know what Blizzard Entertainment dealt with, assuming it was a graphic design studio rather than a video game developer.

Metzen's first work for the company was with the game Justice League Task Force, in which he provided artwork and character animation. Around the same time, Metzen also contributed to 1994's Warcraft: Orcs and Humans by working on artwork, illustrations and the game's documentation. Later video games by Blizzard Entertainment would frequently include Metzen's work in manual design, illustration and concept art. However, Metzen's role in developing later Warcraft games increased significantly with 1995's Warcraft II: Tides of Darkness, which gave him the opportunity to work on the game's fantasy-based fictional universe in addition to designing the game's various scenarios and missions.

In 1996, Blizzard Entertainment launched its second major franchise with the role-playing game Diablo. Diablo's fictional universe was created by David Brevik, Metzen, and Bill Roper. Metzen also provided voice acting for some of the game's characters. On occasion, Metzen would provide voice talent for later video games. In 1998 he took the role of lead designer on the science fiction strategy game StarCraft. Along with James Phinney, Metzen again provided the game's extensive story and script, as well as organizing the voice casting for the game. In 1999, Metzen wrote a short story set in the StarCraft universe with fellow Blizzard Entertainment employee Sam Moore. The story, entitled Revelations, was published in the spring issue of Amazing Stories with cover artwork by Samwise Didier. Returning to the Diablo series in 2000 with Diablo II, Metzen worked on the game's story, script and artwork. In 2001, he published a novel set in the Warcraft universe, entitled Of Blood and Honor.

With 2002's Warcraft III: Reign of Chaos, Metzen was the creative director, a role he would hold in all of Blizzard's later video games, and provided the game's story concept and script. Metzen's work with 2004's massively multiplayer online role-playing game World of Warcraft was not as extensive as his earlier work, but he still contributed with script writing, artwork and voice work.

Metzen announced in early 2005 that he was working on a graphic novel series independent of Blizzard Entertainment. The series, entitled Soldier: 76, is set in a second American civil war in 2010, with increased domestic and global terror threats and the increase in power for the US federal government over that of local state governments serving as a background. Metzen wrote the series' script, while Brazilian artist Max Velati was responsible for the illustration and painting of the book. Soldier: 76 would later appear as a character in Overwatch, Blizzard's online first-person shooter game, released in May 2016.

Chris Metzen teamed with author Flint Dille and artist Livio Ramondelli to create the 12-part, bi-weekly digital comic series Transformers: Autocracy. Autocracy was published by IDW Publishing in 2012. The series focused on the days just before the Great War. It is set after Megatron Origin, and presents the Decepticons as an established force, sowing dissent across Cybertron primarily through terrorist actions. The series focuses on Orion Pax, an Autobot commander charged with rooting out these cells. Transformers: Autocracy was released as a collected Trade Paperback in July 2012 with a bonus foreword authored by Metzen. Autocracy was followed by Transformers: Monstrosity in 2013 and Transformers: Primacy in 2014.

Metzen made a cameo appearance in the 2016 Warcraft film, as a turbaned perfume vendor in Stormwind. On September 12, 2016, Metzen announced that he was retiring from Blizzard Entertainment after nearly twenty-three years with the company. In November 2018, Metzen made an appearance at Blizzcon 2018 in the World of Warcraft Q&A line, where he inquired about the return of the Horde's "true Warchief". Afrasiabi responded that if a fictional job board opening were to be posted needing a Warchief, that he (Afrasiabi) would give Metzen a call. He returned to the role of Thrall for the "Safe Haven" cinematic, released in May 2019, and voiced Thrall in World of Warcraft: Battle for Azeroth. Metzen voiced the Dragon-King Avizandum in the third season of the Netflix's animated series The Dragon Prince. He reprised his role as Thrall once again in World of Warcraft: Shadowlands. Blizzard announced Metzen's return to the company in December 2022, as a creative advisor for the Warcraft franchise. His focus at Blizzard is planned to expand to other properties in the future. In September 2023 it was announced on the Warcraft Facebook page that Chris Metzen has transitioned into the role of Executive Creative Director of the Warcraft universe.

== Personal life and artistic influences ==
He first started creating comics at the age of twelve, but he held an interest in drawing since at least six. A fan of Dungeons & Dragons, Metzen cites the Dragonlance series of novels and Star Wars as the primary inspirations for his fantasy and science fiction creations, and names fantasy and comic book artists such as Walt Simonson and Keith Parkinson as his artistic inspirations.

He defines his artistic style as having been "heavily influenced by Walt Simonson's and Jim Lee's pencilling styles for form" while preferring the "costuming, themes and general feel of Larry Elmore and Keith Parkinson's fantasy paintings".

== Voiceover roles ==
=== Video games ===
- Diablo – Leoric
- StarCraft – Marine, Battlecruiser, Ghost
- Warcraft III: Reign of Chaos – Thrall
- Warcraft III: The Frozen Throne – Thrall, Vol'jin
- World of Warcraft – Thrall, Vol'jin, Orcs, Archaedas, Ragnaros, Nefarian, Bloodlord Mandokir, Hakkar the Soulflayer, Jin'do the Hexxer
- World of Warcraft: The Burning Crusade – Thrall, Zul'jin
- World of Warcraft: Wrath of the Lich King – Thrall, Vol'jin, Varian Wrynn, Dranosh Saurfang
- StarCraft II: Wings of Liberty – Marine, Battlecruiser, Tauren Marine
- World of Warcraft: Cataclysm – Thrall, Vol'jin, Varian Wrynn, Ragnaros, Nefarian, Bloodlord Mandokir, Jin'do the Godbreaker, Hakkar the Soulflayer
- World of Warcraft: Mists of Pandaria – Thrall, Arcanital Mara'kah, Captain Halu'kal, Nalak the Storm Lord, War-God Jalak
- Starcraft II: Heart of the Swarm – Marine, Battlecruiser
- Hearthstone – Thrall, Various minions
- World of Warcraft: Warlords of Draenor – Thrall, Varian Wrynn, Supreme Lord Kazzak
- Heroes of the Storm – Thrall, Varian Wrynn, Imperius
- StarCraft II: Legacy of the Void – Marine, Battlecruiser
- World of Warcraft: Legion – Thrall, Varian Wrynn, Beliash, Duke Hydraxis
- Overwatch – Bastion
- World of Warcraft: Battle for Azeroth – Thrall
- World of Warcraft: Shadowlands – Thrall, Hakkar the Soulflayer, Varian Wrynn
- Warcraft III: Reforged – Thrall, Vol'jin
- Overwatch 2 – Bastion
- World of Warcraft: Dragonflight – Thrall, Archaedas
- World of Warcraft: The War Within – Thrall, Archaedas

=== Television ===
- The Dragon Prince – Avizandum / Thunder
- Mech Strike Monster Hunters: The Eye of Doom – Doctor Doom
