= Garrosh Hellscream =

Fictional character in the Warcraft franchise

- Warcraft character
- Artwork of Garrosh Hellscream on the cover of World of Warcraft: The Magazine, Issue 3.
- First appearance: World of Warcraft: The Burning Crusade (2007)
- Created by: Blizzard Entertainment

In-universe information
- Species: Orc
- Title: Warchief of the Horde
- Family: Grommash "Grom" Hellscream (father)

Garrosh Hellscream is a fictional character in Blizzard Entertainment's Warcraft franchise. He is an orc warrior, the son of Grommash "Grom" Hellscream, and a former Warchief of the Horde. Introduced in World of Warcraft: The Burning Crusade, Garrosh later became one of the central figures of World of Warcraft, serving as Warchief during World of Warcraft: Cataclysm, the main antagonist of World of Warcraft: Mists of Pandaria, and a catalyst for the events of World of Warcraft: Warlords of Draenor.

Garrosh received attention from games journalists for his role as one of World of Warcraft's central villains. Commentary on the character has focused on his militarism, his divisive leadership of the Horde, and the extent to which his downfall represents a corruption or fulfilment of the Horde's ideals.

== Concept and development ==
Garrosh was developed as a successor figure to Thrall and as a way for Blizzard to explore a more aggressive vision of the Horde. Blizzard designer Alex Afrasiabi discussed Garrosh in connection with Warlords of Draenor, explaining that the character's actions allowed Blizzard to revisit Draenor and the earlier history of the orcs through an alternate timeline.

Garrosh was also central to the tie-in novel World of Warcraft: War Crimes, written by Christie Golden. In an interview with Engadget, Golden said that Garrosh had been with the franchise for "a very, very long time" and had a "huge" narrative run across both the game and the novel.

In World of Warcraft: Shadowlands, Blizzard again returned to continue Garrosh's arc in his afterlife, as his unresolved legacies remained of interest to the game's writers.

== Appearances ==
Garrosh first appears in World of Warcraft: The Burning Crusade in Nagrand, where he is introduced as the son of Grommash "Grom" Hellscream. Unlike many orcs of the original Horde, Garrosh and others like him, the uncorrupted Mag'har, had remained in Draenor. The Mag'har orcs retain their original brown or gray skin as they had not personally taken part in the demonic corruption of the majority of the orcish Horde, which turned their skin green. Thrall later tells Garrosh that Grom ultimately died freeing the orcs from the blood curse, leading Garrosh to travel to Azeroth and join the Horde.

In World of Warcraft: Wrath of the Lich King, Garrosh leads the Warsong Offensive, the Horde military expedition to Northrend. After the war against the Lich King, he becomes increasingly prominent within the Horde. He later becomes Warchief after Thrall steps down during the events surrounding World of Warcraft: Cataclysm. His leadership is marked by increasing despotism, militarism, and hostility toward both the Alliance and dissenting members of the Horde.

In World of Warcraft: Mists of Pandaria, Garrosh becomes the expansion's central antagonist. His pursuit of power alienates other Horde leaders and eventually leads Vol'jin to organize a rebellion against him. A combined Alliance and Horde force defeats Garrosh during the Siege of Orgrimmar. After his defeat, he is taken to Pandaria to stand trial for his actions, a premise later explored in World of Warcraft: War Crimes.

Garrosh returns in World of Warcraft: Warlords of Draenor. After escaping imprisonment with the aid of Kairozdormu, he travels to an alternate Draenor before the rise of the Horde and prevents his father Grom from drinking the blood of Mannoroth. Garrosh's interference results in the formation of the Iron Horde and sets the expansion's events in motion. He is ultimately killed by Thrall in Nagrand, concluding the character's role as one of World of Warcraft's major villains.

Garrosh also appears as a playable warrior hero in Hearthstone and as a playable hero in Heroes of the Storm.

== Reception ==
Garrosh is often discussed as an important character of the WarCraft media franchise. Following the release of Mists of Pandaria PC Gamer's Chris Thursten described him as the new "arch-villain" of World of WarCraft, noting that Blizzard had placed him at the center of the expansion's conflict. Philip Kollar of Polygon similarly described Garrosh as World of Warcraft's "biggest villain" in the period leading into Warlords of Draenor, comparing him to earlier major antagonists such as Ragnaros and Arthas Menethil.

Garrosh's characterization divided commentators. Anne Stickney of Engadget called him one of the most polarizing figures in Warcraft lore, writing that players tended either to hate or love him rather than occupy a middle ground. Stickney later argued that Garrosh did not deserve an honorable death because his actions had dishonored the Hellscream name.

Other Engadget writers read Garrosh's arc as tragic or ideologically revealing. Sarah Pine wrote that Garrosh's story became tragic because the insecure figure first seen in Nagrand eventually became the kind of monster he feared becoming. Stickney argued that Garrosh differed from many other Warcraft villains because his downfall did not begin with external magical corruption, but with a revelation about his father's legacy.

Commentators also disagreed over what Garrosh represented for the Horde. Stickney wrote that "Hellscream is not my Warchief", arguing that his actions contradicted the Horde she associated with Thrall. Matthew Rossi disagreed, writing that Garrosh was not perverting the Horde or the orcish character, but represented one possible fulfilment of it.
