= World of Warcraft: Warlords of Draenor =

2014 expansion set for World of Warcraft

- Developer: Blizzard Entertainment
- Publisher: Blizzard Entertainment
- Directors: Tom Chilton; Alex Afrasiabi
- Designers: Cory Stockton; Ion Hazzikostas; Brian Holinka; Chadd Nervig
- Composers: Russell Brower; Neal Acree; Clint Bajakian; Sam Cardon; Craig Stuart Garfinkle; Edo Guidotti; Eimear Noone
- Series: Warcraft
- Platforms: Microsoft Windows, OS X
- Release: NA/EU: November 13, 2014
- Genre: Massively multiplayer online role-playing game
- Mode: Multiplayer

World of Warcraft: Warlords of Draenor is the fifth expansion set for the massively multiplayer online role-playing game (MMORPG) World of Warcraft, following Mists of Pandaria. It was announced on November 8, 2013 at BlizzCon 2013. The expansion was released on November 13, 2014.

The expansion raised the existing level cap from 90 to 100 and introduced player-built, upgradeable garrisons. Most of the player models were updated to have more detailed textures, animations and facial expressions, thus increasing the system requirements of the game.

== Gameplay ==
The expansion allows players to level up to 100, an increase from the cap of 90 in the previous expansion Mists of Pandaria. It initially included eight 5-man dungeons and one raid, Highmaul, that opened in early December 2014. There was also a rebalancing of raid difficulty by the addition of a new difficulty called Mythic, which became the hardest version of the raid system that requires exactly 20 players. The easiest is 25-player raid finder (or "Looking For Raid"), and flexible raiding was expanded to include normal and heroic difficulty, allowing groups to range from 10 to 30 players, with the enemies scaling dynamically depending on the raid size. Players are able to build and upgrade their own garrison, a personal area in which they can recruit non-player characters (NPC) to carry out missions to earn the player or NPC experience and items. The garrison is assembled from the individual buildings like stables or armories, increasing their size and modifying their appearance. The Blackrock Foundry raid was opened in February 2015. The 6.2 patch in June 2015 introduced the third and final raid of the expansion, Hellfire Citadel.

The development team made a number of changes to the player versus player (PvP) aspects of the game. They altered the way that PvP items behave when players fight, reducing crowd control abilities, and added a new PvP-focused island area called Ashran containing various objectives and battles for players to participate in.

The proving grounds were updated for Warlords of Draenor. In order to queue in random matchmaking for a heroic dungeon, a silver medal from the proving grounds is required for the desired role. However, if a full premade group is used instead of matchmaking, the medal requirement does not apply. Challenge modes and the pet battle system were also updated to work within the new content.

The player stats of hit, expertise, dodge, and parry were removed from new items and new tertiary stats were added to give additional movement speed, reduction in area of effect damage taken, indestructible (item does not need to be repaired) or leech (converts a portion of damage and healing into self healing).

Some item drops can randomly be upgraded. For example, quest rewards have a chance of being upgraded to rare or epic quality. Raid loot and heroic/mythic dungeon loot has chance to randomly gain tertiary stats, a bonus socket and/or an additional item level upgrade called "warforged", and baleful gear can proc "empowered" to gain additional item levels from 5 to 45, up from the 650 base item.

== Plot ==
The expansion is set after the events of Mists of Pandaria and takes place in an alternate universe on the world of Draenor, the original homeworld of the orcs as it appeared in Warcraft II: Beyond the Dark Portal, prior to its destruction in the ending of that game and the creation of Outland as featured in Warcraft III: The Frozen Throne and World of Warcraft: The Burning Crusade. Legendary characters of Warcraft's past, such as Grommash Hellscream, Ner'zhul, Gul'dan, and Blackhand appear.

At the end of Mists of Pandaria, Garrosh Hellscream is overthrown as Warchief of the Horde by a combined Alliance–Horde force and taken into custody by the Pandaren so that he can stand trial for the atrocities he committed in Pandaria. However, before he can be judged, Garrosh escapes captivity with the aid of Kairozdormu (a renegade bronze dragon) and travels to the orcish homeworld of Draenor 35 years in the past, prior to the rise of the Horde. As soon as they arrive Garrosh kills Kairoz then proceeds to change history by preventing his father Grommash from drinking the blood of the demon lord Mannoroth, which led to the orcs' corruption by the Burning Legion and played a major role in the events of the first three Warcraft games. This interferes with history, creating an alternate timeline where the orcish clans unite into an "Iron Horde" by using technology Garrosh brought from his time. The Iron Horde begins a war of conquest on Draenor by killing Mannoroth and building a Dark Portal that allows them to travel through time and lay siege to the Azeroth of the present era.

The Iron Horde swiftly conquers the Blasted Lands and obliterates Nethergarde Keep before pushing on deeper into the Eastern Kingdoms, leaving a huge swath of destruction in their wake. Coming together, The Alliance and The Horde assemble expeditionary forces to drive back the Iron Horde and take the fight to the alternate Draenor. Working in concert with The Alliance and The Horde, the adventurers storm the Dark Portal and with the help of Khadgar drive the Iron March (the Iron Horde's Vanguard) back through the Dark Portal to the alternate Draenor. The adventurers then use the Iron Horde's own weaponry to destroy the Draenor side of the Dark Portal but are subsequently forced to flee in order to evade the full might of the Iron Horde. The Azeroth Vanguard flee to the docks and split into two ships; with the Alliance following the Draenei and the Horde joining the Frostwolf Clan. Afterwards, the Alliance and Horde establish bases with portals to Azeroth to bring in supplies and soldiers.

The Alliance and Horde with their Draenor allies fight back the Iron Horde and ultimately confront the escaped war criminal Garrosh Hellscream in Nagrand. Garrosh lashes back and the forces are saved by the intervention of Thrall who challenged Garrosh to mak'gora - a duel of honor that can lead to death. In the battle that follows, Garrosh initially has the upper hand and blames Thrall for his failures since Thrall picked him as Warchief, but Thrall countered that it was caused by his own choices. Thrall then kills Garrosh by using his elemental powers.

With the creator of the Iron Horde dead, the Alliance and Horde adventurers and their Draenor allies set about dismantling the Iron Horde. The adventurers storm into the Gorian Empire's capital of Highmaul to defeat the Iron Horde's allies. In the raid, the adventurers kill the Warlord of the Shattered Hand Clan, Kargath Bladefist. They proceed to slay the creations of the Gorian Empire, including the spellbreakers and the Sorcerer King Imperator Mar'Gok.

Later, the Blackrock Clan, led by Warlord Blackhand, challenge the Horde and Alliance to assault their domain, the Blackrock Foundry. The adventurers take up the challenge by storming through the forge, destroying important Iron Horde machinery, and blocking further growth of the Iron Horde's weaponry. Finally, the adventurers arrive at Blackhand's crucible and slay him.

Next, Gul'dan confronts Grommash and the remnants of the Iron Horde. He again offers Grommash the blood of Mannoroth; Grommash not only refuses but also attacks Gul'dan but he is subdued by him. With Gul'dan's offer of ultimate power, Kilrogg Deadeye, the Warlord of the Bleeding Hollow Clan, ignores Grommash's warnings and drinks the demon blood. The fel blood corrupts Kilrogg, turning him into a monstrous fel orc. Gul'dan assumes control of the Iron Horde and Grommash is imprisoned. It is at this time that the adventurers, with the help of Khadgar, construct a naval fleet to invade Tanaan Jungle and take the fight to Hellfire Citadel to stop Gul'dan and his Iron Horde.

Throughout all this, Khadgar works alongside his bodyguard, the Night Elven Warden Cordana Felsong, to grant the Commander a powerful boon by helping them create a magical ring that will give them the edge they need to face Gul'Dan. Catching wind of their plan, Gul'Dan reveals that he has brainwashed the alternate version of Garona Halforcen and sends her to assassinate Khadgar and the Commander, but Garona is defeated and the spell over her is broken, allowing Khadgar and the Commander to not only gain her as a valuable ally, but also allow them to finish the ring. However, when the ring is finally completed, it is revealed that Cordana's doubts and frustrations with Khadgar's leadership, as well as corruption from a Shadow Orb she had recovered earlier, has allowed Gul'Dan to corrupt and brainwash her just as he did Garona, and the fallen Warden attempts to steal the ring on Gul'Dan's orders. The Commander defeats Cordana, but she escapes.

In the Hellfire Citadel raid, the adventurers slay Kilrogg and remnants of the Iron Horde. When confronted, Gul'dan resurrects Mannoroth only for the adventurers to kill him and free Grommash, who actually joins them. Gul'dan then summons Archimonde to invade Draneor and, with Yrel and Grommash's help, the adventurers kill him too. At the end of the battle, Archimonde in his final moment flings Gul'dan through a portal to Azeroth of the main timeline in order to fulfill his pact with the Legion, setting the stage for the next expansion.

== Development ==
For this expansion the development team changed the file format used by the game, moving from the MPQ file format used previously to a new file format called CASC. The game also contains updated character models with improved textures and a higher polygon count for all races released prior to Cataclysm; the developers have said they want to "keep the soul of the original characters" while upgrading them to the quality of the Pandaren race released in the previous expansion, and the Worgen and Goblin races released in Cataclysm. Game performance has been taken into account with this expansion, with the developers saying that there will be no big drop in performance as a result of the models and that there will be no reduction in the amount of visuals on screen during large fights.

Warlords of Draenor was playable at PAX East and entered alpha testing in April 2014. Blizzard invited players to enter the beta in June 2014. Players who purchased the game received a free level 90 boost for one character. Subsequent boosts may be purchased for $60 each. Blizzard said they made the price high because they did not want to devalue the experience of leveling a character.

With this expansion, Blizzard once again expressed a desire to begin creating expansions at a more frequent rate, as often as once per year.

=== Launch issues ===
During the launch, players attempting to log in experienced long queue times and issues with latency. Blizzard noted that they had experienced DDoS attacks during the launch day as well as unexpected issues from the high concentrations of players in various locations. Players received five days of subscription time as compensation for the issues.

== Reception ==
Reception

Aggregate score
Aggregator	Score
Metacritic	87/100

Review scores
Publication	Score
GamesRadar+	4.5/5
Polygon	9.5/10

Warlords of Draenor was met with generally favorable reviews at its release, shown by its rating of 87 on Metacritic.

During the 18th Annual D.I.C.E. Awards, the Academy of Interactive Arts & Sciences nominated Warlords of Draenor for "Role-Playing/Massively Multiplayer Game of the Year".

=== Sales ===
Warlords of Draenor sold over 3.3 million copies within the first 24 hours, and subscription numbers increased from 7.4 million to over 10.5 million in November 2014. However, by the end of the first quarter of 2015, the number of subscribers had fallen to 7.1 million; 300,000 subscribers fewer than before the release of Warlords of Draenor. By the end of the second quarter, the number of subscribers dropped to 5.6 million, the lowest number of subscribers seen in the game since 2005. By the third quarter, subscribers held at 5.5 million. In November 2015, Blizzard said it will no longer report on the number of World of Warcraft subscribers.

== Reviews ==
- Casus Belli (v4, Issue 13 - Jan/Feb 2015)
