= World of Warcraft: Cataclysm =

2010 expansion set for World of Warcraft

- Developer: Blizzard Entertainment
- Publisher: Blizzard Entertainment
- Director: Tom Chilton
- Designers: Tom Chilton; Cory Stockton; Greg Street; Alex Afrasiabi
- Composers: Russell Brower; Neal Acree; David Arkenstone; Derek Duke; Glenn Stafford
- Series: Warcraft
- Platforms: Microsoft Windows, OS X
- Release: December 7, 2010
- Genre: MMORPG
- Mode: Multiplayer

World of Warcraft: Cataclysm is the third expansion set for the massively multiplayer online role-playing game (MMORPG) World of Warcraft, following Wrath of the Lich King. It was officially announced at BlizzCon on August 21, 2009, although dataminers and researchers discovered details before it was announced by Blizzard. The expansion was released on December 7, 2010.

Shortly after the announcement of the release date, on October 12, 2010, Blizzard implemented patch 4.0.1, which included the overhaul of the game's playing systems.

== Gameplay ==
With the release of Cataclysm, the maximum player level was raised from 80 to 85. The game's two main continents, Kalimdor and Eastern Kingdoms were redesigned with a changed landscape, including flooded areas and lava canals, and some new areas. The quest system was refreshed with almost 3500 new quests along with new and streamlined low and mid-level quests to complement the redesigned areas of Azeroth. Ten new dungeons and five new raids were added as well as a new secondary skill, Archaeology. The glyph system saw an overhaul to have three types of glyph: prime, major, minor. Furthermore, glyphs became permanently learned and require a reagent to remove from a slot. Two new playable races were added, the Worgen for the Alliance and Goblins for the Horde. In addition, existing classes were expanded to be available to more races. The major cities of Orgrimmar and Stormwind experienced major changes. Lastly, the existing talent system was overhauled. Players were awarded their first talent point at level 10, the next at 11, and then once per two levels until level 80. Players that reached levels 81 through 85 received a talent point at each level bringing the total to 41 talent points. Talent points allow the player to choose new and/or improved abilities.

Many of these changes were put into place as of patch 4.0.1, which added all the new systems (new talents, glyph system, spell changes, resource changes, pets at level one, removal of stats from items and from the game, mastery, and others). The changes to old zones were made in patch 4.0.3a, which was released to live servers on November 23, 2010.

=== Plot and setting ===
The central plot of the expansion is the return of the evil dragon aspect Deathwing the Destroyer (originally Neltharion the Earth Warder). Last seen in Warcraft II, which took place more than two decades earlier, Deathwing has spent that time healing himself, and plotting his fiery return from the elemental plane of Deepholm. His return tears through the dimensional barrier within Azeroth, causing a sweeping cataclysm that reshapes much of the world's surface. In the midst of the worldwide disaster comes renewed conflict between the Alliance and the Horde, which is now under the rule of Garrosh Hellscream. With the elemental realms now open to the world, chaotic elemental spirits and their tyrannical lords emerged to help the Destroyer and the nihilistic Twilight's Hammer cult bring about the Hour of Twilight: the end of all life on Azeroth.

The Cataclysm is responsible for a number of political changes within the Horde and Alliance. With the wake of the cataclysm, the Horde's leader, the orc shaman Thrall, stepped down from his duty as Warchief of the Horde to better help the world of Azeroth as a whole. This duty was relinquished to the former overlord of the Warsong Offensive, the Mag'har orc warrior Garrosh Hellscream. Looking for ways to gather more resources and new territory for his people, Hellscream has initiated several brutal strikes against the Alliance, using the cataclysm to the Horde's advantage. The human king Varian Wrynn deployed many of his forces to fight against Garrosh's aggression, storming the Southern Barrens and Stonetalon Mountains, while Garrosh, unlike Thrall, embraced war with the Alliance.

Several new areas are available for players to explore, along with new quests and end-scenes that players can participate in.

==== Rise of the Zandalari ====
Following the heavy losses among troll population, the Zandalari sought to reunite the troll tribes and restore their former empire. They re-established control over Zul'Gurub and Zul'Aman and began attacking territories they regarded as historically theirs. Vol'jin of the Darkspear tribe opposed the Zandalari campaign and worked with members of both the Horde and the Alliance to attack the two cities and halt their expansion.

==== Rage of the Firelands ====
After a ferocious series of battles, Azeroth's heroes banished Ragnaros the Firelord and his elemental minions from Mount Hyjal. Yet, threats to Hyjal persisted, including traitorous druids who had abandoned their allies and joined forces with the elementals. Fearing another elemental invasion, the defenders of Azeroth made a daring assault into Ragnaros' blazing realm: the Firelands. Among the seething flames of this elemental domain, Ragnaros was at his most powerful; only the greatest champions of the Horde and the Alliance, aided by druidic champions like Malfurion Stormrage, could dare hope to defeat the Firelord.

==== Hour of Twilight ====
At the peak of his insanity, Deathwing the Destroyer fought to drive the world into twilight—a devastated future bereft of all life. The Dragon Soul, a powerful artifact lost in the past, was the only weapon capable of truly stopping Deathwing, and so the guardians of Azeroth—the Dragon Aspects—sent a number of valiant heroes racing through time to retrieve it. Despite being attacked by the mysterious Infinite Dragonflight as they travelled the timeways, the champions returned the artifact to the present and delivered it to the wise shaman Thrall. With his aid, the Dragon Soul was deployed against the Destroyer during a brutal battle that began in Azeroth's skies and continued into the roiling heart of the Maelstrom at the center of the world. Through the combined efforts of the Aspects and their allies, the madness of Deathwing was finally brought to an end. However, the remaining Aspects are forced to sacrifice their powers to fuel the Dragon Soul, but feel that their time as guardians of Azeroth has passed and that the heroes of the Alliance and the Horde have proved themselves ready and capable of protecting Azeroth.

=== Environmental redesign ===
One of the primary features of Cataclysm is the redesign of the continents of Eastern Kingdoms and Kalimdor introduced with the launch of World of Warcraft in 2004. While the initial game design did not allow for the use of flying mounts in 'old-world' zones, those zones have been completely redesigned with flight in mind for Cataclysm. Flight is still unavailable for Burning Crusade starting zones for the blood elves and the draenei.

Major changes were brought to these zones. Each faction has a smoother leveling process, as many of the old quests are scrapped and replaced with new ones that incorporate updated gameplay and mechanics that have been changed or redesigned since the game's initial release. Each zone has its own storyline which can be explored through a series of quests. Each faction-specific zone, however, cater only to those of the faction that controls that zone. Neutral or 'Contested' zones in the old world feature a quest line based on the faction conflict, making the player compete against the Alliance or Horde to achieve the desired goal of their faction. This feature makes heavy usage of phasing, which was first seen in the Wrath of the Lich King expansion.

== Announcement, testing, and release ==
In February 2010, in an Activision Blizzard investor call, Blizzard assumed CEO Mike Morhaime revealed that Cataclysm was to be released in that same calendar year.

On May 3, 2010, it was confirmed that the Family & Friends Alpha phase of the testing process for Cataclysm had begun, fueling further speculation that the open alpha would commence within the coming months. Despite the non-disclosure agreement (NDA), much of the beginnings of the game were leaked onto various sources after the client was distributed across the internet within a few days of the alpha testing phase commencing. On May 11, 2010, it emerged that Blizzard had requested that at least one of these sites remove any alpha content until the NDA was lifted.

On June 30, 2010, Cataclysm entered closed beta testing, sending invitations to gamers who had signed up through their Battle.net account. Reporting their first quarter financial earnings in a webcast, Activision CEO Bobby Kotick all but confirmed that latest World of Warcraft expansion, Cataclysm, would be out on store shelves by the end of the year.

In August 2010, Blizzard announced the World of Warcraft: Cataclysm Collector's Edition. Cataclysm was already said to be on track for release in the latter part of 2010 prior to this report; in addition, Blizzard CEO Mike Morhaime went on record saying, "Although an exact release date has not yet been announced, we are on track to launch the expansion by the end of the year. As with all Blizzard games though, we won't release until it's ready."

On September 7 (8 in Europe), the first pre-Cataclysm quest chains were released to live servers, in the Dun Morogh and Durotar zones. A few days later, Patch 4.0.1 was released to public test realms, indicating that a release date might be in the not-too-distant future.

On September 30, news site MMO-Champion estimated that the game had a target release date of December 7, 2010 based on data-mining which revealed the start of the next arena season. GameSpot reported that Amazon.com customers who had pre-ordered the Collector's Edition of the game were sent notifications that they estimated the arrival date would be between January 4 to 18, 2011. Shortly after other websites such as Kotaku were emailed copies of the notifications sent to Amazon customers and posted it on their website marking the release date as January 5, 2011 Amazon.com for the past two expansions overestimated the game's release date in order to give their sales a safety buffer.

On October 4, 2010, Blizzard announced the release of Cataclysm for December 7, 2010. The expansion was made available as Standard Edition, Collectors Edition and as a new digital download from the Blizzard Online Store. The digital version of the game was made available for pre-purchase through Battle.net, and gave gamers the opportunity to play the new expansion pack the moment the servers go live (at 12:01 am PST, December 7).

== Patch history ==
=== Patch 4.0.1 Cataclysm Systems Patch ===
Released on October 12, 2010, Patch 4.0.1, titled "Cataclysm Systems Patch", prepared the game for the changes in the upcoming expansion. It included features such as:

- An overhaul of the talent system
- Major class changes
- "Reforging" item stats
- A new level of glyphs
- Point systems for both PvE and PvP
- User interface updates
- Improved graphics
- A flexible raid lockout system

=== Patch 4.0.3a The Shattering ===
Patch 4.0.3a, "The Shattering", was released on November 23, 2010. Deathwing's return drastically altered terrain throughout Kalimdor and the Eastern Kingdoms, introduced thousands of new quests from levels 1-60, updated level ranges for some zones to improve the questing flow, and many existing races were given new class combinations.

The World of Warcraft: Cataclysm cinematic trailer and login screen were also added to the game.

=== Patch 4.1 Rise of the Zandalari ===
Patch 4.1, "Rise of the Zandalari", was released on April 26, 2011. The changes include the addition of two new heroic 5-man dungeons (revamped from earlier raids): Zul'Aman and Zul'Gurub. The new content revolved around the resurgence of the Zandalari tribe of trolls.

=== Patch 4.2 Rage of the Firelands ===
Patch 4.2, "Rage of the Firelands" was released on June 28, 2011. Changes include the addition of new content in the form of daily quests in a new zone "The Molten Front", accessible from a portal in Mount Hyjal. The new 10 and 25-man Firelands raid took the fight to Ragnaros the Firelord, who rose again after his defeat in the Molten Core raid from the original World of Warcraft. A new legendary weapon was added: Dragonwrath, Tarecgosa's Rest. The Dungeon Journal now allowed players quick access to bosses and their loot in Cataclysm instances from within the game.

=== Patch 4.3 Hour of Twilight ===
Patch 4.3, "Hour of Twilight", was released on November 29, 2011, as the final major patch for Cataclysm. The changes include various brand-new features such as Transmogrification, which allows players to remodel their armor's appearance while retaining the item's stats. A new raid was added, known as Dragon Soul, which Blizzard stated will be the final raid of the expansion. The raid has 7 unique bosses and 8 boss fights; the final two both being against Deathwing himself. The new raid came with a third, easier difficulty option for groups formed through the new Raid Finder tool, which is similar to the Dungeon Finder. Three new heroic 5-man dungeons were added: End Time, Well of Eternity and Hour of Twilight. These are accessible through the Caverns of Time and introduce the story for the new raid instance. Also included is a complete revamp of the monthly week-long Darkmoon Faire, which got its own zone. A new legendary set of daggers called the "Fangs of the Father" were added, only acquirable by rogues after completion of a quest line.

== Reception ==
=== Sales ===
Cataclysm sold more than 3.3 million copies in the first 24 hours of its release including digital presales, and 4.7 million copies in its first month of release. It held the distinction as the fastest selling PC game, overtaking the former holder World of Warcraft: Wrath of the Lich King which sold 2.8 million copies in its first 24 hours, until Diablo III, also a game released by Blizzard Entertainment, took its place by selling 3.5 million copies in its first 24 hours. It also used to hold the record for the most number of copies sold for a PC game in the first month, selling 4.7 million copies, until Diablo III took over its place with 6.3 million copies sold in its first month. In the UK, the game placed 3rd on the "Top 10 Entertainment Software (All Prices); Week Ending December 11, 2010" behind Call of Duty: Black Ops (Activision) and FIFA 11 (EA Games). It later became a UK bestseller, replacing Gran Turismo 5.

=== Critical response ===
Reception

Aggregate score
Aggregator	Score
Metacritic	90/100

Review scores
Publication	Score
GamePro	4/5
GameSpot	8.5/10
GameSpy	9/10
IGN	9/10

World of Warcraft: Cataclysm has received critical acclaim. At Metacritic, which assigns a normalized rating out of 100 to reviews from mainstream critics, the game has received an average score of 90 based on 53 reviews, which indicates "universal acclaim". IGN scored the game 9/10 saying "Cataclysm is far and away the most impressive expansion to an MMO ever made" with "better content than Wrath". GameSpot rated the game 8.5/10 and with a critic score of 9.1/10 declaring World of Warcraft "in the best shape of its life" though stating that some of the new content is "mind-numbing and that there aren't enough new zones". GamePro gave it 4/5 stars calling the game "another solid release" and "much improved in terms of its overall design" but contrastingly stated Cataclysm to be "not quite as impressive as previous expansions". In addition, GameSpy gave Cataclysm their "MMO Game of the Year" at their 'Game of the Year 2010' awards. During the 14th Annual Interactive Achievement Awards, the Academy of Interactive Arts & Sciences nominated Cataclysm for "Role-Playing/Massively Multiplayer Game of the Year" and "Outstanding Achievement in Original Music Composition".

=== Subscriptions ===
Even with the success of Cataclysm, World of Warcraft saw a gradual decline in subscribers through 2011. Following the release of Cataclysm, subscription levels reached a peak of 12 million subscribers but soon dropped to pre-Cataclysm levels of 11.4 million by the end of March 2011. In early November 2011, subscriptions declined even further to 10.3 million users. In 2012, the subscription numbers stabilized at around 10.2 million users, holding steady for two consecutive quarters. On August 2, 2012, it was revealed that subscription numbers had continued to decline, landing at an approximate 9.1 million subscribers.
