= Races and factions of Warcraft =

Artwork depicting constituent members of the Alliance (left) and the Horde (right) as of World of Warcraft: The Burning Crusade, which was released in 2007.

The Warcraft franchise, created by Blizzard Entertainment, features numerous fictional peoples, races and political or military factions. The principal opposing races and factions of Warcraft are the Alliance and the Horde, whose conflict began with the war between humans and orcs in Warcraft: Orcs & Humans (1994). The Alliance was established during the events of Warcraft II: Tides of Darkness (1995), while Warcraft III: Reign of Chaos (2002) introduced further playable factions and developed the history of both sides. Other forces in the setting include the demonic Burning Legion, the Undead Scourge, the naga and various entities associated with the Void.

In the massively multiplayer online role-playing game World of Warcraft, a player's choice of race originally determined whether their character belonged to the Alliance or the Horde. The initial lineup of Alliance races at the inception of World of Warcraft in 2004 comprised humans, dwarves, gnomes and night elves, while the Horde comprised orcs, trolls, tauren and the undead Forsaken. The 2012 expansion Mists of Pandaria introduced the pandaren as the first playable race able to choose either faction. Later cross-faction races included the dracthyr in Dragonflight, the earthen in The War Within, and the haranir in Midnight. Blizzard also introduced systems that permit members of opposing factions to play together, including cross-faction instanced groups and guilds.

Faction allegiance has encouraged player loyalty and rivalry both inside and outside World of Warcraft. Commentators have discussed faction restrictions and population imbalances, and criticised the role assigned to Horde players in Battle for Azeroth and the later reduction of faction-specific storytelling. Academic publications have examined the factions' competing accounts of conflict, their association with real-world cultures, and differences between male and female character designs.

== Development ==
Warcraft: Orcs & Humans began with opposing human and orc armies. Warcraft II: Tides of Darkness expanded those armies by replacing some human and orc units with other peoples: elven archers, troll axethrowers, ogres and Death Knights were among the additions. Dwarves and goblins also became part of the setting. Warcraft III: Reign of Chaos offered four playable factions: the Human Alliance, the Orcish Horde, Night Elves and Undead Scourge.

Although conflict between the Alliance and the Horde had been established in the real-time strategy games, Blizzard did not decide early in the development of World of Warcraft that players would have to join one of two opposing factions. Former designer Jeff Kaplan said in 2026 that the decision was contested among the developers and was settled only nine to twelve months before the game's release. Kaplan and Rob Pardo, who had played EverQuest, opposed the division. Blizzard co-founder Allen Adham preferred the model used by Dark Age of Camelot, in which belonging to a realm immediately placed players on a team. According to Kaplan, Pardo retained the faction division after succeeding Adham as lead designer.

In the early versions of World of Warcraft, race determined allegiance. Players on opposing sides could not form groups or guilds together, and their characters' speech was rendered unintelligible to one another. These restrictions separated players even when they were pursuing similar activities. Paladins were initially exclusive to the Alliance and shamans to the Horde. The Burning Crusade gave the Alliance draenei shamans and the Horde blood elf paladins. Faction opposition also structures player-versus-player (PvP) combat. In World of Warcraft Classic, players in PvP realms can be attacked by the opposing faction in contested territory, while normal realms allow players to opt into such combat.

The introduction of new playable races in later expansions eventually changed how players joined either faction. According to Mists of Pandaria production director J. Allen Brack, Blizzard had previously considered allowing goblin players to choose between the Alliance and Horde during the development of Cataclysm. That proposal was not adopted, but Brack said the developers liked the idea of a character beginning without a faction and choosing one after adventuring with other players. This was later used for the pandaren who were made playable in Mists of Pandaria.

Discussing faction balance in 2021, Hazzikostas said that the overall player population was fairly evenly divided, but high-end raiding had become concentrated in the Horde. He traced the imbalance partly to earlier advantages derived from racial abilities. Even after those advantages were reduced, the larger pool of Horde raiders made recruitment easier and encouraged further transfers.

The separation of the factions has since been relaxed for some multiplayer activities. Blizzard enabled cross-faction groups for selected instanced content in 2022 and cross-faction guild membership in 2023. The factions nevertheless retained separate affiliations in the game's story and in some activities. In a 2025 interview, game director Ion Hazzikostas recalled that some players objected to the return to faction warfare in Battle for Azeroth after the factions had repeatedly cooperated against common enemies. Executive producer Holly Longdale said Blizzard had not ruled out further faction-conflict stories but wanted them to be appropriate to the narrative.

In September 2026, Hazzikostas said that developing two separate levelling storylines would divide the content available to each faction, and that Blizzard also considered player feedback and the plausibility of faction warfare when deciding whether to use a shared story. He noted that the history of hostility between the Alliance and Horde remained part of their identities even when their members cooperated against common enemies.

== Alliance ==
The Alliance originated as an intergovernmental military alliance among the human kingdoms of Azeroth and their allies in Warcraft II, following the destruction of Stormwind by the Orcish Horde in the first game. Anduin Lothar leads the survivors of Stormwind north to seek the assistance of King Terenas of Lordaeron, with up to seven human nations uniting against the invaders. Its military consisted of various human, dwarf, high elf and gnome units. The Alliance fragments following the Horde's defeat.

Warcraft III begins with Lordaeron threatened by a plague spread by agents of the Undead Scourge. The night elves are introduced as a separate playable faction whose forces later cooperate with Jaina Proudmoore's human forces in their struggle against the Burning Legion at Mount Hyjal. Jaina subsequently establishes Theramore Kalimdor. When her father, Admiral Daelin Proudmoore, resumes armed conflict against the Horde, she sides with its Warchief Thrall to preserve their truce. By the beginning of World of Warcraft, Stormwind serves as the principal human kingdom associated with the Alliance, alongside the dwarves of Ironforge, gnomes of Gnomeregan and night elves of Darnassus.

The Alliance's military leaders have included Anduin Lothar, its supreme commander during the Second War; Varian Wrynn, the king of Stormwind who was later styled High King of the Alliance; and Anduin Wrynn, Varian's son and successor. Its constituent members nevertheless retain their own political leaders. Subsequent expansions added draenei, worgen, the Tushui pandaren and allied races including void elves, Lightforged draenei, Dark Iron dwarves, Kul Tiran humans and mechagnomes.

=== Humans ===
The humans are one of the two playable peoples in Warcraft: Orcs & Humans. Their kingdoms draw on medieval European architecture, arms and government, while the religious and military orders associated with the Holy Light include priests and paladins. Human mages and clerics appear in the early strategy games; the Kirin Tor of Dalaran is among the setting's best-known magical organisations.

In the setting's history, the kingdom of Arathor united previously separate human tribes and formed an alliance with the high elves against the Amani trolls. Arathor later gave rise to the kingdoms of Stromgarde, Lordaeron, Stormwind, Gilneas, Alterac and Kul Tiras, as well as the city-state of Dalaran. Wrath of the Lich King further connected the origins of humans to the vrykul, an ancient people whose descendants were altered by the curse of flesh. Stormwind is the Alliance's principal human city in World of Warcraft.

=== Dwarves ===
The dwarves are a mountain-dwelling people introduced as allies of the humans in Warcraft II. Their clans include the Bronzebeard, Wildhammer and Dark Iron dwarves. The Bronzebeards inhabit Ironforge in Khaz Modan and are known for metalworking, mining and the use of firearms. The Wildhammers are associated with gryphon riders, while the Dark Irons historically occupied Blackrock Mountain and fought the other clans.

The Cataclysm storyline changed the political situation in Ironforge, bringing the three clans into a ruling Council of Three Hammers. The Dark Iron dwarves subsequently became a playable Alliance allied race. In The War Within, the dwarves investigate the history of the earthen, stone beings created by the Titans, from whom they descend.

=== Gnomes ===
The gnomes are a small people known for mechanical inventions and arcane magic. They originated from the titan-forged mechagnomes and established the city of Gnomeregan near Ironforge. Before the events of World of Warcraft, an invasion by troggs and the release of dangerous substances rendered much of the city uninhabitable. Many gnomes took refuge among the dwarves. Their leader, Gelbin Mekkatorque, continued efforts to recover Gnomeregan.

==== Mechagnomes ====
The cyborg mechagnomes of Mechagon combine biological bodies with mechanical enhancements. They were added as an Alliance allied race during Battle for Azeroth, alongside the Horde's vulpera..

=== High elves ===
The high elves of Azeroth are descended from the night elf upper class Highborne who left Kalimdor following the War of the Ancients. They established Quel'Thalas in the northern Eastern Kingdoms, creating the Sunwell as a source of magical power. Conflict with the Amani trolls led them to seek assistance from the human kingdom of Arathor. In return, the elves taught selected humans to use arcane magic.

The high elves assisted the Alliance during the Second War, when the Horde and its troll allies attacked Quel'Thalas. Much of the elven kingdom was subsequently destroyed during the Scourge invasion in Warcraft III. Prince Kael'thas Sunstrider renamed many of the survivors elves, or sin'dorei, in remembrance of their dead. Some survivors retained their high elf identity and remained allied with the Alliance or with the Kirin Tor. In Wrath of the Lich King, high elves led by Vereesa Windrunner formed the Silver Covenant in Dalaran. High elves have generally appeared as non-player characters rather than as a separate playable race.

==== Void elves ====
The void elves are blood elves or high elves infused with the Void, a source of shadow magic that can overwhelm its users' minds. Led by Magister Umbric, they were exiled from Silvermoon for studying the Void but are rescued from its influence by Alleria Windrunner . Alleria undertakes to teach them to control their powers and led the void elves to pledge their allegiance to the Alliance. They became a playable Alliance allied race ahead of Battle for Azeroth, initially available through the expansion's pre-purchase.

=== Night elves ===
The night elves, or kal'dorei, were introduced as a playable faction in Warcraft III. They inhabit the forests of Kalimdor and are associated with druidism, nature spirits and Elune. Their units in Warcraft III include female Sentinels, dryads, druids and mobile tree-like buildings known as ancients. Several units can conceal themselves at night, and their workers, wisps, can gather lumber without destroying trees.

According to the series' history, the night elves once centred their civilisation on the Well of Eternity. Its use by Queen Azshara's Highborne drew the attention of Sargeras and the Burning Legion, leading to the War of the Ancients. The Well's destruction divided the ancient landmass in an event called the Sundering. In later stories, the night elves joined the Alliance, and their capital was established at Darnassus on the world tree Teldrassil. During Battle for Azeroth, Horde forces burned Teldrassil, displacing its population. Subsequent stories follow Tyrande Whisperwind and the night elves' efforts to establish a new home.

=== Draenei ===
The draenei are tall humanoids with skin ranging from purple to pale blue, cloven goat-like hooves, reptilian-like tails, and dark hair. Males often have tentacle-like appendages extending from their chin, and occasionally large, complex structures on their forehead, while females have two horns on their temples extending backwards and thinner versions of the male's appendages hanging from behind the back of the jaw. The draenei were added as an Alliance playable race in the 2007 expansion for World of Warcraft, The Burning Crusade. The draenei introduced the shaman class to the Alliance in The Burning Crusade, ending its previous restriction to Horde characters. The Lightforged draenei, veterans of the Army of the Light whose bodies are infused with the Holy Light through a ritual, later become a separate Alliance allied race associated with Battle for Azeroth.

The draenei were first mentioned in the game manual of Warcraft II: Tides of Darkness, and first appeared in The Frozen Throne represented by Akama and his followers who assist Illidan Stormrage in overthrowing the demon Magtheridon in Outland. Blizzard's later account identifies this group as the Broken, physically altered draenei who had been decimated by the Orcish Horde while under the influence of the Burning Legion. These hunched draenei differ greatly in appearance from the draenei subsequently introduced and made playable in The Burning Crusade.

According to the revised backstory introduced in The Burning Crusade, the draenei are exiled members of the eredar people who refused to follow Sargeras and the Burning Legion. Led by the prophet Velen and assisted by the naaru, benevolent beings composed of energy, these eredar fled from their homeworld Argus, while the remainder of their people accepted Sargeras's offer of power and became corrupted as demons. Taking a name meaning "exiled ones", they eventually settle on the world known as Draenor, where the Burning Legion turns the orcs against them. Following the destruction of Draenor, the vessel Exodar eventually carried a group of draenei to Azeroth, where it crashed on Azuremyst Isle. Their alliance with the humans and other Alliance peoples was based partly on their common devotion to the Holy Light. The Lightforged draenei, who continued fighting the Legion as part of the Army of the Light faction, later became an allied race of the Alliance.

This revised account changed the previously established relationship between Sargeras and the eredar in series lore. Responding to criticism in 2006, Chris Metzen acknowledged that he had overlooked his earlier writing, but retained the revised history. Lead designer Jeff Kaplan explained that Blizzard wanted them to be as appealing as the other playable races, rather than giving the Alliance an unattractive race to counterbalance the Horde's blood elves.

=== Worgen ===
The worgen are wolf-like humanoids who were initially encountered as enemies and later became an Alliance playable race in the 2010 expansion Cataclysm. Their curse is traced to night elf druids whose attempts to take on the form of the wolf spirit Goldrinn caused them to lose control of their transformations. The Scythe of Elune, created in an effort to master the form, became associated with the curse.

The curse subsequently spread to the human kingdom of Gilneas. Its afflicted inhabitants retain human identities but can transform into worgen, and they joined the Alliance after the kingdom was attacked by the Forsaken. King Genn Greymane became one of the Alliance's recurring political and military leaders.

== Horde ==
The Horde first appeared as an invading orcish army in Warcraft: Orcs & Humans. In the first two strategy games it fought against the human kingdoms, conquered Stormwind and was eventually defeated by the Alliance of Lordaeron. After the Second War many surviving orcs were imprisoned in internment camps. Warcraft III introduced a reformed Horde organised by Thrall, whose followers sought to leave the legacy of demonic corruption behind and establish a homeland in Kalimdor.

Thrall's Horde consisted chiefly of orcs, Darkspear trolls and tauren. In World of Warcraft it also included the Forsaken, and later expansions added blood elves, goblins, Huojin pandaren, Nightborne, Highmountain tauren, Mag'har orcs, Zandalari trolls and vulpera. The Horde's leadership changed repeatedly across the series, with conflicts arising under the warchiefs Garrosh Hellscream and Sylvanas Windrunner.

=== Orcs ===
The orcs are one of the original playable peoples introduced in Warcraft: Orcs & Humans. They are muscular humanoids with prominent tusks. Orc clans are traditionally associated with shamanism, hunting, warfare and codes of personal honour. The orcs originally inhabited Draenor, where their clans were manipulated by agents of the Burning Legion. Many drank the blood of the demon Mannoroth, binding them to demonic influence and changing their appearance.

The orcs invaded Azeroth through the Dark Portal and destroyed Stormwind in the First War. The Alliance defeated their armies in the Second War and later carried the conflict back to Draenor. Warcraft III follows Thrall as he frees imprisoned orcs and leads them across the sea to Kalimdor. There he establishes the city of Orgrimmar and builds a new Horde with the trolls and tauren. Later stories distinguish between Thrall's followers, the surviving clans of the original Horde, and other orcish groups from alternate Draenor in Warlords of Draenor.

=== Trolls ===
The trolls are an ancient people of Azeroth divided into numerous tribes and kingdoms. Forest, jungle, ice, sand and Zandalari trolls appear throughout the franchise. Their historical empires predate many of the human and elven kingdoms, and their conflicts with the elves form part of the history of Quel'Thalas. Troll religious practices involve the worship of powerful spirits called loa, which often take animal forms.

The Amani forest trolls allied with the Horde during the Second War under Zul'jin. In Warcraft III, the Darkspear tribe, led by Vol'jin and his father Sen'jin, joins Thrall's Horde after encounters with the orcs. The Darkspear became one of the original playable Horde races in World of Warcraft. The Zandalari, whose island kingdom of Zandalar is visited during Battle for Azeroth, subsequently joined the Horde as an allied race.

=== Tauren ===
The tauren, or shu'halo, are a bovine humanoid people introduced in Warcraft III. They resemble minotaurs and inhabit the plains of Kalimdor, where they practise shamanism and druidism. Their settlements, clothing and architecture draw on imagery associated with the Indigenous peoples of the Americas. The tauren of Mulgore establish their capital at Thunder Bluff. In Warcraft III, Cairne Bloodhoof and his people face attacks from centaurs before receiving help from Thrall's orcs. The tauren join the Horde and become one of its original playable races in World of Warcraft. Cairne's son Baine later succeeds him as their leader.

Variants of tauren include the Highmountain tauren, who inhabit the Broken Isles and were introduced in Legion. They are distinguished from the tauren of Kalimdor by antlers resembling those of moose. Their history includes the chieftain Huln Highmountain, who fought during the War of the Ancients. They subsequently became a playable Horde allied race. The taunka were introduced in Wrath of the Lich King, live in Northrend, and have broad, bison-like faces. Their settlements and customs have been shaped by the region's harsh conditions. The taunka ally with the Horde during its campaign against the Lich King, but are not a separate playable race.

=== Blood elves ===
The blood elves, or sin'dorei, are survivors of the Scourge's destruction of the high elf kingdom of Quel'Thalas. Introduced in The Frozen Throne, they take their name in memory of those killed when Arthas Menethil invaded their homeland and corrupted the Sunwell. Their initial leader, Kael'thas Sunstrider, sought new sources of magic to sustain his people after the loss of the Sunwell.

In The Frozen Throne, Kael'thas serves under the Alliance commander Garithos but is imprisoned after cooperating with naga led by Lady Vashj. He and his followers escape to Outland, where they join Illidan Stormrage. The blood elves later join the Horde in The Burning Crusade. Their new political leadership in Quel'Thalas includes Lor'themar Theron and the Blood Knights, an order of paladins. At the conclusion of The Burning Crusade, the Sunwell is restored with the aid of the naaru M'uru. The blood elf kingdom and Sunwell return as major locations in Midnight.

=== Forsaken ===
The Forsaken are undead who has gained independence from the Lich King's control. Their founding leader, Sylvanas Windrunner, was a high elf ranger-general killed by Arthas Menethil and raised as a banshee in Warcraft III. In The Frozen Throne, the Lich King's weakening power allows Sylvanas and several other undead to regain their free will. They take control of territory in Lordaeron and eventually join the Horde.

The Forsaken originally ruled from the Undercity beneath the ruins of Lordaeron. Their later storylines include the development and use of plague weapons, their campaigns against Gilneas and the Alliance, and Sylvanas's departure from the Horde during Battle for Azeroth. Following her departure, a Desolate Council assumed leadership of the Forsaken.

=== Goblins ===
The goblins are small green-skinned humanoids introduced in Warcraft II. They are associated with commerce, explosive devices and mechanical engineering. Goblin merchants and engineers serve multiple political powers, although goblin sappers and zeppelins assist the Horde during the Second War. Their homeland is the island of Kezan, where the mineral kaja'mite plays a part in their history. In Cataclysm, the Bilgewater Cartel joins the Horde after the eruption of Mount Kajaro forces its people to leave Kezan. Goblins become a playable Horde race and establish settlements in Azshara.

=== Nightborne ===
The Nightborne are descendants of night elves who remained in the city of Suramar after the War of the Ancients. They survived the Sundering beneath a magical barrier and came to depend on the Nightwell, a source of arcane energy. Separation from the Nightwell causes some Nightborne to become Nightfallen, and eventually Withered.

The Nightborne feature in the Suramar campaign of Legion. The player assists a rebellion against the city's ruler, Grand Magistrix Elisande, who has allied with the Burning Legion. Following the overthrow of her regime, the Nightborne establish ties with the blood elves and become a playable Horde allied race.

=== Vulpera ===
The vulpera are fox-like nomads who inhabit Vol'dun, a desert region of Zandalar, in Battle for Azeroth. Their caravans trade goods and transport supplies across the desert. The vulpera later joined the Horde as an allied race, announced at the same time as the Alliance's mechagnomes.

== Cross-faction races ==
Pandaren player characters can choose between the Alliance or the Horde after beginning without either allegiance. Later additions with a choice of faction include dracthyr, beings with draconic and humanoid forms, in Dragonflight; earthen, a people made of living stone, in The War Within; and haranir, reclusive inhabitants of the subterranean fungal jungle of Harandar, in Midnight.

World of Warcraft: Forever, a separate experience offered alongside Modern and Classic World of Warcraft, introduces the Skyborne, descendants of elven exiles who formed a pact with wind spirits. A Skyborne player character's allegiance may be chosen at character creation: Windshaper Skyborne join the Horde and High Order Skyborne join the Alliance. Among Skyborne, shamans are available to the Horde and mages to the Alliance; both sides also have warriors, hunters, rogues and druids.

In 2022, Blizzard introduced premade cross-faction groups for supported dungeons, raids and rated PvP. Participation was optional, and the feature did not initially extend to ordinary matchmaking or remove hostility between the factions in the outdoor world. Cross-faction guilds followed in 2023. Members could share guild chat and benefits, although the guild itself retained the faction affiliation of its leader.

=== Pandaren ===
The pandaren are anthropomorphic pandas who first appeared in Warcraft III through the hero Chen Stormstout. They became playable in Mists of Pandaria, the first World of Warcraft expansion to allow members of one playable race to choose between the Alliance and Horde. Pandaren players begin their adventure on the Wandering Isle and select a faction at the end of their starting storyline. Brack said the team had considered the pandaren for earlier expansions before deciding to use them in Mists of Pandaria.

The two groups are associated with different philosophies. The Tushui pandaren, led by Aysa Cloudsinger, join the Alliance and favour deliberation and discipline; the Huojin, led by Ji Firepaw, join the Horde and favour decisive action. Pandaren also inhabit the continent of Pandaria, where other factions, including the Shado-Pan, Golden Lotus and August Celestials, appear in the expansion's quests.

=== Dracthyr ===
The dracthyr are dragon-like soldiers created by Neltharion, later known as Deathwing. They were introduced as a playable race in Dragonflight, initially in conjunction with the evoker class. Their abilities include dragon breath attacks and a form of aerial movement called Soar.

=== Earthen ===
The earthen are stone-bodied beings created by the Titans and associated with the origins of the dwarves. An isolated earthen society in Khaz Algar was introduced in The War Within, where its inhabitants contend with deteriorating Titan machinery and longstanding instructions governing their lives.

=== Haranir ===
The haranir are a people associated with the region of Harandar and the roots of the World Trees. They became a playable allied race in Midnight, in which players may recruit them after completing the Harandar storyline.

== Other races and groups ==
Some organisations operate across the Alliance–Horde divide or remain neutral between the two coalitions. The Argent Dawn and its successor organisation the Argent Crusade as well as its allies the Knights of the Ebon Blade, Death Knights who escape the Lich King’s control, oppose the Scourge and the Burning Legion without pledging allegiance with either coalition. The Cenarion Circle and Earthen Ring bring together druids and shamans, respectively, from both factions as part of their mandate to protect the natural world.

Neutrality also varies among goblin organisations: the Steamwheedle Cartel remains independent of the Alliance or the Horde and continue to operate as neutral traders, whereas the Bilgewater Cartel are affiliated to the Horde.

=== Burning Legion ===
The Burning Legion is an army of demonic beings assembled by the fallen titan Sargeras. It was the principal enemy of the night elves during the War of the Ancients and returned to invade Azeroth in Warcraft III. Its commanders include the eredar Archimonde and Kil'jaeden, the nathrezim Tichondrius, and the pit lord Mannoroth. The Legion used demonic corruption to bring the orcs of Draenor under its influence, contributing to the formation of the original Horde.

The Legion serves as a principal opposing force in Warcraft III, The Burning Crusade and Legion. The last of these expansions brings the demons back to the Broken Isles. At the end of Legion, Sargeras is imprisoned by the Pantheon, and Illidan Stormrage remains behind to watch over him. The Legion no longer leads subsequent expansion storylines, although demons continue to appear.

=== Devouring Host ===
The Devouring Host is a coalition of Void creatures led by Xal'atath, an ancient entity associated with the Void and known as its Harbinger. Once imprisoned by the Old Gods within a weapon called the Blade of the Black Empire, she influenced its successive wielders through whispers. After escaping captivity, she united rival Void factions into an army threatening Azeroth. In Midnight, her forces invade the blood elf homeland of Quel'Thalas and attack the Sunwell, prompting Alliance and Horde forces to cooperate in its defence. The Host dominates the Voidstorm, a realm whose creatures consume others to gain power. Its leading followers include the domanaar, powerful beings of the Void, and players confront its forces in the Voidspire raid.

=== Dragonflights ===
The dragons of Azeroth are intelligent, magical creatures organised into dragonflights, traditionally distinguished by their colours: red, blue, green, bronze and black. Their original leaders, known as the Dragon Aspects, received powers from the titans to protect the world. Alexstrasza and the red dragonflight were charged with protecting living creatures and nurturing new life; Malygos and the blue dragonflight were responsible for overseeing arcane magic and preventing its misuse; Ysera and the green flight were charged with watching over the Emerald Dream, a magical realm representing Azeroth's natural world untouched by civilisation; Nozdormu's bronze flight were charged with preserving Azeroth's timeline against attempts to alter its history; and Neltharion's black flight was entrusted with protecting Azeroth's mountains, land and subterranean depths.

The allegiances of some of these Dragon Aspects have changed over time: corrupted by the Old Gods, Neltharion became Deathwing and turned against the other dragonflights; Malygos withdrew into madness after Deathwing devastated the blue dragonflight and provoked the Nexus War after he sought to stop mortal spellcasters from using arcane magic by any means necessary; Ysera eventually succumbs to the Emerald Nightmare, a corruption spreading within the Emerald Dream, and is slain by Tyrande Whisperwind. In Dragonflight, the dragonflights return to their ancestral Dragon Isles, where adventurers from both the Alliance and Horde assist them in reclaiming their homeland.

The infinite dragonflight consists of corrupted bronze dragons and is a recurring enemy faction in World of Warcraft. Its attempts to alter Azeroth's history bring it into conflict with players in the Caverns of Time and again in Dragonflight. Its leader, Murozond, is a corrupted future incarnation of Nozdormu whom players confront in Cataclysm's End Time dungeon.

=== Murlocs ===
The murlocs are amphibious humanoids commonly encountered near coastlines, lakes and rivers in World of Warcraft. They have fish-like faces, webbed limbs and an inarticulate-sounding language. Their settlements are generally organised into tribes, and most are hostile to nearby player characters. They appear as recurring enemies rather than as a playable race.

Murlocs have also appeared in Blizzard promotional material. Murloc-themed pets have been distributed at BlizzCon, including a character dressed in the armour of a marine from StarCraft. Blizzard also released the song "I Am Murloc", performed by a group involving artist Samwise Didier.

=== Naaru ===
The naaru are crystalline beings associated with the Holy Light, introduced in The Burning Crusade. They assisted Velen and the draenei in escaping the Burning Legion and later organised resistance to the demonnic sources. A'dal, a naaru leader in Shattrath City, heads the Sha'tar faction which governs the rebuilt city, and opposes Illidan and the Legion. The Army of the Light, another faction led by the naaru, fights the Legion on Argus and becomes an allied force during the campaign there.

Naaru are capable of entering a dark or Void state. One captured naaru, M'uru, was used by the blood elves to supply the powers of their Blood Knights, and later became a raid boss in the Sunwell Plateau. After his defeat, the power remaining from M'uru was used to restore the Sunwell. Naaru also feature in later conflicts involving the Light and the Void.

=== Naga ===
The naga are aquatic, serpent-like beings descended from the Highborne of ancient night elf civilisation. When the Well of Eternity collapsed during the Sundering, Queen Azshara and her followers sank beneath the sea. They were transformed into naga following Azshara's dealings with the Old Gods. Female naga typically have multiple arms and practise magic, while males are usually larger and serve as warriors.

Lady Vashj leads a naga force in The Frozen Throne, initially opposing night elf forces and later helping Kael'thas Sunstrider and Illidan Stormrage. Naga also appear as enemies and occasional allies in World of Warcraft, notably in The Burning Crusade, Battle for Azeroth and the story of Azshara's underwater kingdom of Nazjatar.

=== Nerubians ===
The nerubians are a spider-like people whose kingdoms include Azjol-Nerub in Northrend and Azj-Kahet beneath Khaz Algar. Azjol-Nerub resisted the Lich King's invasion before the Scourge conquered its underground settlements and slaughtered their inhabitants, who were then subsequently raised as undead warriors incorporated into the Scourge's ranks. In The War Within, Queen Ansurek of Azj-Kahet allies with Xal'atath, who helps transform nerubian followers into enhanced soldiers through the power of the Void. Her rule faces opposition from the Severed Threads, a conspiracy whose campaign against her culminates in the assault on Nerub-ar Palace.

=== Ogres ===
The ogres are large humanoids introduced as enemies in Warcraft: Orcs & Humans. They briefly join the Horde during the events of Warcraft II, including two-headed ogre-mages capable of casting spells. Their society is divided into clans in which physical strength commonly determines leadership. In Warcraft III some ogres serve as mercenaries, while others remain hostile to all of the other playable factions.

Ogre clans appear throughout World of Warcraft and its expansions but remain a non-playable race. The Stonemaul clan has an association with the Horde, while other ogres are hostile or independent. In The Burning Crusade, ogres living in Blade's Edge Mountains form the faction known as Ogri'la. Players can earn reputation with both Ogri'la and the Skyguard through daily quests.

=== Old Gods ===
The Old Gods are enormous, parasitic entities associated with the Void, depicted as eldritch creatures with tentacles, eyes and other distorted bodily features who can corrupt other beings. First introduced in The Frozen Throne, the Old Gods command armies of monstrous servants and mortal worshippers. C'Thun's servants include the qiraji, insect-like beings associated with the ruined city of Ahn'Qiraj. Under Cho'gall, the Twilight's Hammer develops from an orc clan into a cult devoted to the Old Gods and their herald, Deathwing. In Cataclysm, its forces include twilight dragons and cultists transformed into elemental beings, with the Bastion of Twilight serving as its principal command centre. In Battle for Azeroth's Visions of N'Zoth update, N'Zoth's forces assault titan facilities in Uldum and the Vale of Eternal Blossoms. These include aqir attacking in the name of N'Zoth and the Black Empire, whose ancient centre, Ny'alotha, becomes the setting for the raid against him.

=== The Scourge ===
The Scourge is an undead army controlled by the Lich King and introduced in Warcraft III. Its ranks include zombies, animated skeletons, ghouls, banshees and undead nerubians. It spreads a plague through the Cult of the Damned, mortal cultists working as agents of destruction within the human kingdom of Lordaeron, destroying its government and preparing the way for the Burning Legion's invasion. Prince Arthas Menethil becomes one of its commanders after taking up the cursed sword Frostmourne and later succeeds Ner'zhul as the Lich King.

The Scourge returns as the chief enemy in Wrath of the Lich King, when both player factions campaign against Arthas in Northrend. Following his defeat, Bolvar Fordragon takes up the Helm of Domination to keep the Scourge contained. In the opening events of Shadowlands, Sylvanas destroys the helm, breaking the position of Lich King and setting the expansion's story in motion.

== Reception and analysis ==
=== Player identity and criticism ===
In the Boss Fight Books edition of World of Warcraft, Daniel Lisi describes faction identification extending beyond the game, including Mountain Dew flavours marketed as Alliance Blue and Horde Red. He also reproduces Thomas Brignall's observations of hostile exchanges about rival players. Brignall reported that some Horde players characterised Alliance players as immature or unintelligent, and that faction-directed insults could become personal.

Heather Newman of Forbes criticised the position imposed on Horde players by the opening of Battle for Azeroth. Unlike Garrosh, whom players from both sides could fight, Sylvanas remained their leader, and advancing the story required participation in her campaign. Newman reported differing reactions: some players enjoyed the villainous role, while others regretted their allegiance or supported Saurfang's opposition. A cinematic featuring his defiance against Sylvanas' military tactics prompted players to remove their shoulder armour in solidarity.

In 2021, Steven Messner of PC Gamer described the concentration of high-end raiders in the Horde as a social imbalance that could persist after racial abilities were balanced, because its larger pool of players encouraged further transfers. Reporting the later introduction of cross-faction guilds, Cameron Koch of GameSpot described it as another easing of restrictions that had separated players since launch, while noting that players could still maintain single-faction guilds.

In 2026, Jez Corden of Windows Central argued that reducing faction-specific storytelling weakened his attachment to World of Warcraft. He distinguished the convenience of playing with friends across faction boundaries from the loss of separate political perspectives and campaigns. His criticism of Midnight included the treatment of night elf participation in defending the blood elves, which he considered inadequately reconciled with earlier conflicts.

=== Academic interpretations ===
The relationship between faction conflict in the narrative and the rules governing players is examined by René Glas and Esther MacCallum-Stewart. Glas argues that communication restrictions and separate quest structures made the faction boundary harder for players to cross than it was for fictional characters, who could cooperate across allegiances. MacCallum-Stewart questions a straightforward division into good Alliance and evil Horde through the competing accounts of Warsong Gulch. Horde quests justify logging as a need for supplies, while Alliance quests defend the forest as both habitat and protection against invasion. She argues that these accounts give both sides reasons to fight without resolving whose claim is right.

Race, appearance and allegiance are central to Melissa J. Monson's analysis of racial essentialism in the game. Drawing on observations between 2004 and 2008, she examines how its racial categories connect physical appearance, culture, abilities and political affiliation, and how those categories relate to real-world stereotypes. Jessica Langer interprets the Alliance as culturally familiar and the Horde as foreign within a Western framework, identifying Caribbean coding in trolls and Indigenous North American imagery in tauren. She argues that displacement and oppression, rather than a shared moral outlook, connect the playable Horde peoples. Examining character bodies, Hilde G. Corneliussen contrasts the original Alliance's human-like appearance with the Horde's more monstrous designs, a division disrupted by the introduction of draenei and blood elves. She also observes that female models often soften the monstrous features retained by their male counterparts.

Player affiliation was examined empirically by Nicolas Ducheneaut, Nick Yee, Eric Nickell and Robert J. Moore in a study of activity on five servers beginning in 2005. Alliance characters outnumbered Horde characters by roughly two to one in the sample used for their race analysis. The authors discussed differences in faction appeal but cautioned against a simple division between inexperienced Alliance players and experienced Horde players.
