= Blood Knight =

Blood Knight may refer to:

- The Blood Knight, a fantasy novel by Greg Keyes in "The Kingdoms of Thorn and Bone" series
- a unit of Vampire Counts in the Warhammer fantasy universe
- a group of guard tamers in the Digimon World series, see List of characters in the Digimon World series
- an order of blood elf Paladins residing in Silvermoon City in the fantasy MMORPG World of Warcraft
