= World of Warcraft: Midnight =

2026 expansion set for World of Warcraft

- Cover art of World of Warcraft: Midnight
- Developer: Blizzard Entertainment (Note: Additional work by Blizzard Boston)
- Publisher: Blizzard Entertainment
- Directors: Ion Hazzikostas; Morgan Day; Jeremy Feasel
- Producer: Holly Longdale
- Designers: Chris Metzen; Ely Cannon; Chris Robinson; Maria Hamilton; Evan Lee
- Composers: Leo Kaliski; Neal Acree; David Arkenstone; Glenn Stafford
- Series: Warcraft
- Platforms: Windows; macOS
- Release: March 2, 2026
- Genre: Massively multiplayer online role-playing game
- Mode: Multiplayer

World of Warcraft: Midnight is the eleventh expansion pack for the massively multiplayer online role-playing game (MMORPG) World of Warcraft, following The War Within. It was announced in August 2025, and released on March 2, 2026. It acts as the second part of the Worldsoul Saga trilogy of expansions led by Chris Metzen.

== Gameplay ==
The primary setting for Midnight is the kingdom of Quel'Thalas, which is divided into two zones, Eversong Woods and Zul'Aman, with additional zones including Harandar and the Voidstorm, while the capital city of Silvermoon serves as the central hub for players. The narrative focuses on the conflict between the forces of Light and Void and continues directly from events depicted in The War Within, as the void entity Xal'atath leads an invasion that threatens to engulf Azeroth in darkness. Blizzard has described the expansion as a key chapter in a longer, interconnected storyline intended to unfold across multiple future expansions.

Midnight retains the core mechanics of World of Warcraft while introducing several new gameplay systems and updates, and raising the level cap to 90. The expansion adds a player housing feature that allows players to obtain and customize personal spaces within Azeroth using items earned through gameplay, professions, and achievements. The Prey system acts as a new open-world activity and is designed to provide more dynamic encounters and challenges. The expansion also expands endgame content through new Delves designed for solo and small-group play, additional dungeons and raids, and improvements to user-interface and quality-of-life systems intended to streamline player progression.

== Plot ==
=== Midnight campaign ===
==== The Vanguard ====
Having gained unprecedented power by defeating her former master, (Note: During the events of The War Within expansion.) the Void entity Xal'atath summons the Voidstorm above the Isle of Quel'Danas and commands the Devouring Host, a vast army of Void creatures, to lay siege to the Sunwell, a fount of light magic sacred to the blood elves. Lor'themar Theron, regent lord of the blood elf kingdom of Quel'Thalas and one of the leaders of the Horde, commands the defense alongside Lady Liadrin, matriarch of the Blood Knights. They receive reinforcements from Turalyon, lord commander of the Alliance, who leads the Vanguard of the Light, a coalition of paladins and priests. Arator, Turalyon's half-elf son, helps Lor'themar evacuate civilians, but they are eventually overwhelmed and retreat. The Vanguard conducts a ritual to empower the Sunwell and channel a beam of light into the Voidstorm, temporarily ending Xal'atath's invasion. After regrouping in the blood elf capital of Silvermoon City, Lor'themar allows Turalyon and the Vanguard to remain as guests and continue maintaining the ritual at the Sunwell.

==== The War of Light and Shadow ====
Arator learns that the Lightbloom, plant life infused with the Light, had begun growing across Eversong Woods and joins the haranir Orweyna to investigate. They find that the hostile wildlife from the Lightbloom was being led by the ruutani, a race native to Harandar, Orweyna's subterranean homeland. Orweyna continues gathering information while Arator seeks out the void elf Umbric, who was previously exiled from Quel'Thalas, (Note: During the events of the Legion expansion.) to help stop the Voidstorm. They discover that the Twilight's Blade, cultists devoted to Xal'atath, had infiltrated the town of Tranquillien. Antenorian, the town's governor, is revealed to have allied with the cultists, who attack Tranquillien but are quickly repelled. Arator and Umbric then track down Antenorian and kill him to prevent the cultists from launching further attacks. While Umbric starts researching the Voidstorm, Arator joins Liadrin at a village overgrown with Lightbloom. They learn that the Amani trolls, the blood elves' ancient enemy, had begun harvesting the Lightbloom to create lightwood weaponry to use against the Twilight's Blade. Lor'themar and Turalyon arrive to force the Amani and their commander, Zul'jan, back to the border of Zul'Aman, home to the Amani trolls. Arator attempts to end the conflict peacefully, but is wounded by his light-enraged father during an attempt to kill Zul'jan.

Liadrin tries to ease tensions with Zul'jan until his sister Zul'jarra, chieftain of the Amani tribe, intervenes. She reluctantly allows Liadrin into Zul'Aman, where Mor'duun, leader of the Twilight's Blade, has invaded. Zul'jarra gathers the other chieftains to request their aid, but they all refuse. She agrees to partake in a series of trials to become the "Hash'ey" and gain the blessings of the four loa of Zul'Aman, who previously abandoned the Amani due to the treacherous deeds of Zul'jin, Zul'jarra's grandfather. (Note: During the events of The Burning Crusade expansion.) Not trusting the loa, Zul'jan refuses to support his sister and believes that only lightwood weapons can help defeat the cultists and conquer the rest of Quel'Thalas. Liadrin joins Zul'jarra on her journey, where they pass the trials to gain the loa's blessings and earn the allegiance of the other tribes. With her new army assembled, Zul'jarra learns that Zul'jan defied her orders by attacking the cultists without her, resulting in heavy losses. Zul'jarra and Liadrin then lead the army into battle and kill Mor'duun, ending the Twilight's Blade incursion in Zul'Aman. While Zul'jarra is granted the title of "Hash'ey" for uniting her people, Zul'jan remains bitter that his plan failed.

Orweyna travels with Halduron Brightwing, ranger-general of the Farstriders, to Harandar, where the roots of the World Trees converge. She warns her people about the Lightbloom but is found guilty by the haranir elders for violating their isolationist traditions. The elder Hagar helps Orweyna atone, while the elder Ruia refuses to work with outsiders. Hagar brings Orweyna and Halduron to a peaceful ruutani village where they discover that the rare material Alndust, which they believed had been blessed by the haranir's goddess, can cure the ruutani of the Lightbloom. Orweyna then gathers more Alndust, distributes it among the ruutani, and prevents the roots of a World Tree from becoming corrupted. Orweyna returns to the surface, where the Lightbloom was spreading aggressively in Eversong, overwhelming Halduron and Rommath, the leader of the Magisters. Ruia is revealed to have redirected the Lightbloom to Eversong as revenge after the Sunwell caused the Lightbloom to first appear in Harandar. Hagar helps stop Ruia, preventing the Lightbloom from spreading any further. Halduron brings Orweyna and Hagar to Silvermoon, where Lor'themar accepts the haranir as allies.

As tensions between the authoritarian Vanguard and Silvermoon's citizens intensify, Arator experiences a crisis of faith. He joins the undead priest Alonsus Faol, leader of the Conclave of Priesthoods, on a journey across the Eastern Kingdoms to find relics imbued with the Light that can help maintain the ritual at the Sunwell. Along the way, Alonsus helps Arator acknowledge his complicated relationship with the Light. They eventually reach the site of a great battle, where Turalyon witnessed the death of Anduin Lothar, commander of the Alliance during the Second War. (Note: During the events of Warcraft II: Tides of Darkness) Understanding his father's guilt, Arator repairs Turalyon's broken shield and returns to Silvermoon to reconcile with him. Although Turalyon refuses to accept his old shield, Arator keeps it to follow in his father's footsteps.

As the Sunwell begins to weaken, Umbric acquires a Void relic to open a portal into the Voidstorm. He leads an expeditionary force of void elves through the portal and is joined by Arator and Lothraxion, high commander of the Vanguard. Arator reunites with Alleria Windrunner, his mother, who previously accessed the Voidstorm during her hunt for Xal'atath. Alleria, Arator, and Lothraxion capture Decimus, one of several domanaar who act as generals of the Devouring Host. Decimus informs them that disabling key Nexus-Points will weaken the Voidstorm and that Nexus-King Salhadaar, leader of the Shadowguard ethereals, now reluctantly serves Xal'atath following his defeat. After reaching a Nexus-Point, Lothraxion attempts to free a captive naaru, an ancient race made of holy light. Salhadaar corrupts the naaru, and Alleria uses the essence of the dark naaru L'ura inside her to kill it, angering Lothraxion. Decimus explains that Terminas, the most powerful of the domanaar, possessed the Mantle of Predation that can shut down all the Nexus-Points simultaneously. He then seemingly betrays the others and allows Terminas to capture them, but the distraction allows Decimus to steal the Mantle before killing Terminas. Angered by Decimus' deception, Lothraxion goes to destroy a Nexus-Point himself, despite knowing that the resulting energy surge would obliterate Silvermoon. Alleria and Arator stop Lothraxion and reluctantly kill their former ally. Decimus uses the Mantle to disable the Nexus-Points, allowing Turalyon and the Vanguard to enter the weakened Voidstorm.

==== A New Dawn ====
Alleria, Turalyon, and Arator join the Vanguard's assault on the Voidspire, Xal'atath's base of operations. They battle the Devouring Host and kill Salhadaar, whom Xal'atath had tortured after he turned against her, and are also forced to kill the remaining commanders of the Vanguard when they become "lightblinded" and attack their allies. Xal'atath is confronted at the summit of the Voidspire, where she infuses Alleria with a vast amount of Void energy, causing her to lash out at Turalyon and Arator. Alleria soon comes to her senses, but Xal'atath stabs her and releases L'ura, which fires a void beam into the Sunwell, corrupting it into the Darkwell. While Umbric portals Arator to safety, Alleria and Turalyon fall into the Darkwell, and Arator ponders whether his parents survived. The Devouring Host then swarms Quel'Danas, shrouding it in darkness and overwhelming the remainder of the Vanguard, leaving only a few survivors.

Arator proposes to Lor'themar and his advisors that they unite the various elven people to help retake the Darkwell, despite the protests of Rommath and Aethas Sunreaver, leader of the Sunreavers. While the blood elves already had the aid of Umbric and the void elves, Lor'themar persuades Shandris Feathermoon, high general of the night elves, to join them. Arator recruits his aunt Vereesa Windrunner, ranger-general of the Silver Covenant high elves, who previously left Quel'Thalas following the death of its last king, Anaestrian Sunstrider. (Note: During the events of Warcraft III: Reign of Chaos) Aethas confronts Vereesa at Silvermoon's gates, not trusting the high elves after they previously massacred many of the Sunreavers, (Note: During the events of Mists of Pandaria expansion.) but he reluctantly allows them to pass after Vereesa returns artifacts that belonged to Anaestrian. Thalyssra, leader of the nightborne and Lor'themar's wife, musters her own forces and prevents the Twilight's Blade from sabotaging them.

The combined might of the elven armies assembles in Silvermoon and storms through the Devouring Host's forces. L'ura is engaged at the Darkwell and destroyed before she can further unleash its corruption. Xal'atath confronts Arator and Vereesa, but is interrupted by Sylvanas Windrunner, Alleria and Vereesa's sister, who arrives from the Shadowlands, forcing Xal'atath to retreat into the Darkwell. After briefly reuniting with her family, Sylvanas returns to the Shadowlands as penance for her past actions and continues to investigate its mysteries. (Note: During the events of Shadowlands expansion.) In the aftermath of the battle, Rommath allows Umbric and the void elves to return to Silvermoon and gives them a permanent embassy in the city. Aethas and Vereesa decide to end their long-standing conflict by combining the Sunreavers and the Silver Covenant into the Silversun Compact. Leaders from each elven faction offer a piece of their heritage to purify the Darkwell, and the newly reignited fount of magic is renamed the Dawnwell, which now acts as a symbol of unity for all elven people.

=== Curse of Ula'tek campaign ===
==== Revelations ====
Orweyna and Hagar hold a gathering in Harandar and invite both the elven leaders and the troll tribes to attend. Hagar reveals that the elves and trolls share common ancestry, having descended from the haranir that chose to remain on the surface. Zul'jan refuses to accept the revelation and demands proof. Orweyna shows Zul'jan and his uncle Kinduru a vision of the ancient past where the Amani summoned the powerful loa Ula'tek to help them win a war against Kith'ix, a general of the Old Gods. Zul'jan and Kinduru return to Zul'Aman and find no mention of these events in their people's written history but discover an enchanted spirit mask knowledgeable of Ula'tek. The spirit explains that Hex Lord Malacrass, former advisor to Zul'jin, once planned to harness Ula'tek's power to defeat the elves. They instruct Zul'jan to retrieve a dagger, the Fang of Ula'tek, but the magic protecting it kills Kinduru. The spirit reveals himself as Malacrass and offers to help Zul'jan restore the Amani to glory. Zul'jarra later learns of her uncle's death and sets out to find her brother.

With Silvermoon still under threat from assaults by the Devouring Host and Shadowguard, a strike force consisting of void elves, the Army of the Light, and Illidari demon hunters is tasked with hunting down their leaders. Decimus aids them by opening rifts to Naigtal and Val, worlds formerly controlled by the Burning Legion, which the Devouring Host and Shadowguard had since occupied. The strike force successfully defeats both leaders, ending further incursions.

==== Conquering the Coiled Isle ====
Zul'jan and Malacrass reach the Coiled Isle and use the Fang of Ula'tek to unleash the Children of Ula'tek, an army of snake-like creatures that worship Ula'tek, who attack Zul'Aman. Zul'jarra, Liadrin, and Orwenya repel the invaders before travelling to the Coiled Isle with forces consisting of the united troll tribes. While Zul'jarra's advisors urge her to give up on Zul'jan, she locates her brother, but he lashes out and cuts her with the Fang of Ula'tek. Zul'jarra's health then quickly deteriorates from the cursed dagger's poison. Orweyna explores the island to search for a cure and experiences a vision of the past. She discovers that Ula'tek was first summoned by the priestess Nek'zali using the Fang of Ula'tek, which saved the Amani from Kith'ix, but cost many innocent lives. The surviving Amani then entombed Nek'zali, imprisoned Ula'tek, and abandoned the Coiled Isle. Orweyna inadvertently awakens Nek'zali's spirit, who allies with Malacrass to free Ula'tek.

Liadrin and Orweyna later confront Zul'jan in the tomb of Atal'Utek and inform him that destroying the Fang of Ula'tek will break its curse and save Zul'jarra. Zul'jan willingly gives up the dagger to save his sister, but Malacrass captures Zul'jan and drags him to the Venomous Abyss, Ula'tek's prison. Liadrin and Orwenya then bring the Fang of Ula'tek to Zul'jarra and destroy it, freeing her of its curse. Zul'jarra and her forces return to Atal'Utek to rescue Zul'jan and stop Malacrass from freeing Ula'tek. They enter the Venomous Abyss and defeat both Nek'zali and Malacrass, but witness Zul'jan being transformed into one of the Children of Ula'tek and are forced to fight him. Zul'jarra and her allies then kill Ula'tek to prevent her escape and end the threat against Zul'Aman. Zul'jan returns to normal and reconciles with his sister before dying in her arms.

Since the disappearance of Alleria and Turalyon, Arator spends his time at the Dawnwell mourning the loss of his parents. Umbric recruits him to investigate the remnants of the Twilight's Blade, hoping to find a lead on Xal'atath's location. He also mentors Arator on the benefits of wielding the Void, as Arator grows increasingly disillusioned with the Light. They discover that Antenorian had survived their previous encounter with him and that Xal'atath used the Darkwell as a gateway to an unknown location. Arator uses the Void to extract information from Antenorian and learns that Ula'tek's death allows for Kith'ix to be resurrected. After killing Antenorian once again, Arator and Umbric return to Silvermoon and inform Lor'themar of the impending threat.

==== The Promise of Tomorrow ====
The Aqir, an ancient insectoid race that serves Kith'ix, awaken from their hibernation beneath Quel'Thalas and invade Silvermoon. Lor'themar and his forces repel the Aqir and hastily march to Zul'Aman to prevent further attacks. Liadrin insists they work with the Amani rather than provoking conflict between the elves and trolls, and proposes sending a small elite force to find and destroy Kith'ix. Lor'themar and Zul'jarra remain hostile toward each other as they journey to the Coiled Isle, only agreeing to work together until they defeat their common enemy. They delve into Atal'Utek and vanquish both the remaining Twilight's Blade and the Aqir before confronting Kith'ix in its prison. After Kith'ix overwhelms Lor'themar and Zul'jarra with the Void, Liadrin sacrifices herself and uses the Light to empower her allies, allowing them to kill Kith'ix for good.

Lor'themar returns to Silvermoon and gives a speech to his people where he eulogizes Liadrin. He then meets with Zul'jarra and proposes an uneasy truce. Both leaders agree to work towards ending the hostilities between the elves and trolls to honor Liadrin's sacrifice. Meanwhile, Orwenya experiences a vision of Azeroth's Worldsoul being corrupted by the Void and informs Arator, who realizes that Xal'atath's true goal was to claim the power of the Worldsoul for herself.

== Development ==
World of Warcraft: Midnight was officially revealed in August 2025 during Gamescom alongside a cinematic trailer and early gameplay footage. The expansion entered closed beta testing following its announcement, with access granted through invitations and select pre-purchase options. Developers stated that Midnight was designed to strengthen long-term narrative cohesion within the franchise while introducing systems that had been requested by players for many years.

== Reception ==
Reception

Aggregate scores
Aggregator	Score
Metacritic	82/100
OpenCritic	83% recommend

Midnight received "generally favorable" reviews with a score of 82 on the review aggregation website Metacritic, based on 28 critic reviews. Review aggregator OpenCritic assessed that the game received "strong" approval, being recommended by 83% of critics, based on 29 reviews.

Jen Allen from GamesRadar+ called the expansion a "fantastic adventure" and praised both the new zones and visuals. Harvey Randall from PC Gamer described Midnight as "gorgeous and deeply atmospheric" and noted that the side quests do a great job at fleshing out the new zones. Joelle Daniels from GamingBolt wrote that the new housing system was "phenomenal" and felt that it "adds a sense of community that has been sorely lacking in many modern multiplayer games." Robin Baird from MMORPG.com highlighted the new Prey system and called it a "fun new way to augment open world play" but expressed disappointment that reaching new ranks was time-gated. Len Hafer from IGN wrote that Midnight represents a "second Golden Age of WoW" and praised the expansion's "satisfying" endgame activities, including new dungeons and delves.

Despite the positive critical reception, the writing and narrative have received criticism. Tyler Edwards from Massively Overpowered noted that the main story had been "sugar-coated" and felt that it was "completely bereft of any drama or threat." The expansion has also been criticised due to the technical issues and bugs experienced during post-launch updates. Following the release of the 12.0.5 update in April 2026, which introduced numerous issues to the game, Blizzard Entertainment issued a formal apology, stating that the update "was not up to our standards".

Midnight was nominated for Best Game Expansion at the 44th Golden Joystick Awards.
