= MDY =

MDY may refer to:

- MDY, month–day–year format for writing out dates
- MDY, IATA airport code for Henderson Field (Midway Atoll)
- MDY Industries, creator of the Glider bot software
- MDY, NYSE Arca ticker symbol for MidCap 400 SPDR, an American exchange-traded fund
