= Blood elf =

Fictional elven people in the Warcraft franchise

Blood elves
- Warcraft race
- Promotional artwork depicting a female (left) and male (right) blood elf respectively.
- First appearance: Warcraft III: The Frozen Throne (2003)
- Created by: Blizzard Entertainment
- Genre: Fantasy

The blood elves, sometimes capitalized as Blood Elves, are a faction of elves in Blizzard Entertainment's Warcraft media franchise. Known as the sin'dorei (lit. 'children of the blood') in their own language, the faction was depicted in the 2003 real-time strategy game expansion to Warcraft III: Reign of Chaos, Warcraft III: The Frozen Throne, as a significant majority of high elf survivors whose people had been decimated by the undead Scourge. They are introduced a playable race for player characters aligned with the Horde faction in the massively multiplayer online role-playing game World of Warcraft with its first expansion, The Burning Crusade.

The blood elves' homeland is Quel'Thalas, and their capital is Silvermoon City. The blood elves' early World of Warcraft storyline concerns their dependence on magic after the loss of the Sunwell, their source of power. The integration of the blood elves into the Horde made the paladin class available for Horde players; previously, only players in the opposing Alliance faction could become paladins. Quel'Thalas was rebuilt by the release of the 2026 expansion Midnight.

The male blood elf's androgynous appearance prompted debate during development of The Burning Crusade after Blizzard altered its character model. Academic studies of blood elves have examined homophobia among players, Western beauty standards and racial stereotypes.

== Development ==
In a 2003 interview about The Frozen Throne, Blizzard vice president Bill Roper described the blood elves as survivors of the high elf houses from Warcraft III: Reign of Chaos. He said their name honoured their lineage and distinguished them from the night elves. The Blood Mage, a new hero unit, shared the race's affinity for magic. Blood elf units were added to the game's human faction, including the Blood Mage, Spellbreakers and Dragonhawk Riders.

Blizzard announced the blood elf as one of two new playable races for The Burning Crusade at BlizzCon in October 2005. Blood elves could become paladins, previously restricted to the Alliance, while the new Alliance race, the draenei, could become shamans, previously restricted to the Horde. Blizzard intended for the blood elves' appearance and starting area to attract players to the Horde and help reduce faction population imbalances. The red and orange colour scheme of Quel'Thalas stand in contrast with the purple tones of the territories of the night elves.

In October 2006, during beta testing, Blizzard announced an increase in the body mass of the male blood elf model. The company said it wanted a more masculine appearance and a stronger, more threatening presence appropriate to the Horde. Blizzard revealed updated blood elf models in November 2014, after the release of Warlords of Draenor. Senior artist Dusty Nolting described small adjustments to the female model, including its nose and fingertips. Senior artist Joe Keller said the male model's pose and hairstyle were to be retained in the update. Rigging and animation were still in progress when the models were shown. In 2021, game director Ion Hazzikostas cited jokes about male blood elves looking feminine or being mistaken for women among older material submitted for an internal review. He said the team had reviewed content that could make the game less welcoming and had left some material unchanged, removed some and rewritten some.

For Midnight, Blizzard rebuilt Silvermoon and the surrounding zones with new assets and removed the loading screen separating Quel'Thalas from the rest of the Eastern Kingdoms. Game designer Jake Shillan said the redesign was meant to show how the region had changed since The Burning Crusade.

== Appearances ==
In The Frozen Throne, blood elves are the remnants of the high elves in the aftermath of an undead invasion and are initially led by Kael'thas Sunstrider, the last prince of Quel'Thalas. Blood elf players in The Burning Crusade begin in Quel'Thalas, where parts of their capital, Silvermoon, remain in ruins. The Dead Scar marks the route taken by the undead army, and ruined areas are occupied by the Wretched, blood elves overcome by their thirst for magic.

Blood elf paladins belong to the Blood Knights. Their original backstory describes how Kael'thas and the wizard Astalor Bloodsworn used a captive naaru, a being associated with the holy power called the Light, to give the order its powers.

In Midnight, Quel'Thalas and the Sunwell, the blood elves' source of power, come under attack by Xal'atath and her army. Silvermoon is the expansion's hub. Eversong Woods and the former Ghostlands have been combined, and the Dead Scar has healed. Quests in the former blood elf starting area now concern helping blood elves find their place in society.

== Reception and analysis ==
=== Critical reception ===
In a 2006 preview, GameSpot's Justin Calvert and Andrew Park predicted that blood elves would become popular because of the female models' appearance and the race's abilities, particularly their usefulness against spellcasters in player-versus-player combat. On the other hand, James Orry of VideoGamer.com reported mixed reactions to Blizzard's decision to increase the body mass of the male blood elf character model to give them a more "substantial, masculine feel".

Gabe Graziani of GamesRadar+ described the blood elf quest-givers as arrogant and self-absorbed. He found that their starting experience offered less guidance than the draenei's. Engadget's Eliot Lefebvre described improved anatomy and a more natural stance in the male model as part of the 2014 update.

Writing in 2023, PC Gamer's Sarah James welcomed the planned return to Quel'Thalas in Midnight. She recalled starting with a blood elf hunter and described the original starting area as the part of the game for which she felt the most nostalgia. In his 2026 review, GameSpot's Cameron Koch praised the rebuilt Silvermoon's architecture, music and lighting. He also welcomed changes to familiar locations and quests that moved the setting's story forward. Koch reported positive responses to the rebuilt city and Eversong in player posts on Reddit.

=== Gender and sexuality ===
Hilde G. Corneliussen connected the 2006 model change with an association between body mass and masculinity, and with the notion that Horde races should look threatening. She also described blood elves and draenei as disrupting the previous division between human-like Alliance races and monstrous Horde races. Christian Schmieder identified two positions in the controversy over the initial version of the male blood elf character model: some players used "gay" and "metrosexual" to disparage features they considered insufficiently masculine, while others defended androgynous elves by appealing to conventions in fantasy fiction. Schmieder cautioned that acceptance of androgyny within that tradition did not necessarily mean acceptance outside it. Carol Stabile described male blood elves as "pretty and queer" and reported their appeal to some female and queer players. In Audrey Brehm's study, one survey respondent described male blood elves as an exception to the game's muscular male models and reported hearing other players describe them as looking gay.

Bonnie Nardi reported seeing many female blood elf and night elf avatars but few female dwarves or orcs. Male players she interviewed said they chose female characters because they enjoyed looking at them. KellyAnn Fitzpatrick read the blood elf models as presenting male characters as ready for combat and female characters for the viewer's gaze. She contrasted the male model's squared torso and forward-leaning head and shoulders with the female model's angled, less active stance. With equippable clothing removed, the female model also exposed more of its buttocks and upper thighs.

=== Racial representation ===
In her postcolonial reading of World of Warcraft, Jessica Langer compared blood elves to drug addicts marginalised within white Western society. She interpreted their idealised appearance as an expression of Western beauty standards, and their contempt for other races' appearances as sometimes racist. Langer read the male models' hairstyles and jokes as feminisation and implied homosexuality. She contrasted the beauty of their surroundings with the magic addicts inhabiting them.

Sociologist William Sims Bainbridge examined the culture that developed around the blood elf faction based in Silvermoon City in The Warcraft Civilization. He described political dissent with blood elf characters objecting both to the unrestricted use of magic and to alliances with the orcs and Forsaken, while their opponents defended the benefits supplied by magical technology. Bainbridge argued that blood elves generally treated the Light as a source of power rather than primarily as a source of ethics or spiritual enlightenment. He contrasted the blood elves with humans, arguing that although both peoples treated magic as a practical tool, the blood elves were more willing to draw power from almost any source, including demonic magic, despite repeated warnings that their magical dependence could ultimately control them. Bainbridge also compared the blood elves to ancient Rome, characterising them as proud of their technological advancement and intellectual sophistication, but also as morally corrupt and intensely hedonistic.

Nathaniel Poor described the placement of light-skinned blood elves in the Horde and darker-skinned night elves in the Alliance as a reversal of the convention associating light elves with good and dark elves with evil. He argued that this reversal complicated a simple division of the factions into good and evil.
