= Pandaren =

Fictional race in the Warcraft franchise

- Warcraft race
- Concept art of the pandaren character Chen Stormstout.
- First appearance: Warcraft III: The Frozen Throne (2003)
- Created by: Blizzard Entertainment
- Genre: Fantasy

The Pandaren are a fictional race of anthropomorphic pandas in Blizzard Entertainment's Warcraft franchise. They were created by Blizzard artist Samwise Didier, who first drew panda characters in his personal artwork before the concept was incorporated into Warcraft. Pandaren imagery appeared in Warcraft III: Reign of Chaos, and the brewmaster Chen Stormstout was introduced in its expansion, Warcraft III: The Frozen Throne. The race later became a major part of World of Warcraft: Mists of Pandaria, where Pandaren became playable characters able to join either the Alliance or the Horde.

The appearance of the Pandaren changed during their development. Early artwork combined pandas with Japanese-influenced clothing and weapons, while Mists of Pandaria drew much more heavily on Chinese architecture, philosophy, martial arts and visual culture. The Pandaren's expanded role in the Warcraft mythos drew a mixed response from commentators. Contemporary writers compared them with the Kung Fu Panda films and questioned their comic presentation, while later scholars have discussed the Pandaren in relation to cultural translation, racial representation and Orientalism.

== Concept and development ==
The Pandaren originated in the personal artwork of Blizzard artist Samwise Didier. Didier said that he had been drawing pandas for years and traced the idea to a Christmas picture he made after the birth of his daughter. Blizzard incorporated the Pandaren into the Warcraft setting and in 2002 used them in April Fools' Day material by presenting them as a supposed fifth playable faction.

Production director J. Allen Brack said in 2011 that the Pandaren had been discussed as a playable race for almost every World of Warcraft expansion and had even been considered before the original game was released. According to Brack, their popularity in Warcraft III kept the idea under serious consideration, and Blizzard returned to it while finishing development of Cataclysm. Didier said that most of his early Pandaren artwork concerned Chen Stormstout for Warcraft III, whom he conceived as an unusually adventurous member of the race rather than a typical Pandaren. He described the creation of a larger Pandaren society as one of the ideas he had particularly wanted to see realized in the franchise.

For Mists of Pandaria, Blizzard made Pandaren the first playable World of Warcraft race available to both the Alliance and Horde. Pandaren player characters begin without a faction and choose one after completing their introductory storyline. Brack said Blizzard had earlier considered a similar neutral system for goblins during development of Cataclysm, but abandoned it. The idea was revived for the Pandaren so that players could begin the game together before joining opposing factions.

Chinese culture became the principal influence on the Pandaren and their surroundings during development of Mists of Pandaria. Designer Dave Kosak said that Blizzard drew on Chinese landscapes, architecture, philosophy, music and martial arts. Members of the team regularly watched kung fu films during development, while Chinese folk instruments were incorporated into the soundtrack. Kosak also said that several artists working on the expansion were of Chinese heritage. Kosak cited Taoism as an influence on the Pandaren, particularly their preference for peace and interests outside warfare, which Blizzard used as a contrast to the conflict between the Alliance and Horde. Brack said that the close association between pandas and China made Chinese influence a natural part of the concept. He also said that Blizzard consulted employees in its Chinese office while developing the expansion, while describing Warcraft more generally as a setting drawing from several cultural and fantasy traditions.

== Appearances ==
Before Mists of Pandaria, the Pandaren had only a small role in the Warcraft franchise. Pandaren imagery appeared in Warcraft III, and Chen Stormstout was introduced in the bonus Horde campaign in The Frozen Throne. Chen Stormstout accompanied Rexxar during part of the bonus campaign in The Frozen Throne, and other Pandaren references appeared elsewhere in Warcraft material.

Mists of Pandaria introduced Pandaria as a major setting and greatly expanded the depiction of Pandaren society. Player-created pandaren begin outside the Alliance–Horde conflict before choosing one of the two factions.

Pandaren have subsequently appeared in other Blizzard games. Chen and Li Li Stormstout are playable in Heroes of the Storm, and Pandaren characters also appear in Hearthstone.

== Reception and analysis ==
Blizzard's decision to make Pandaren the focus of Mists of Pandaria drew a mixed response. McCurley described them as one of the races most often requested by World of Warcraft players, despite their history as a Blizzard in-joke. Wired, by contrast, opened its interview with Brack by asking whether the game had "jumped the shark" by centering an expansion on panda martial artists. Brack acknowledged that some players found the concept too cute, but said the lighter tone was intentional.

The Pandaren were also compared with DreamWorks Animation's Kung Fu Panda films. McCurley argued that the comparison did not establish that Blizzard had copied DreamWorks, since Pandaren had appeared in Warcraft before the first film was released. Sophie Prell of NBC News accepted that the Pandaren predated the Kung Fu Panda films, but was still critical of the later visual redesign. She contrasted the muscular figures and Japanese-influenced armor of earlier artwork with the rounder playable models in Mists of Pandaria, and argued that the race's association with eating and comic behavior made the similarity to Kung Fu Panda more pronounced.

In the introduction to Techno-Orientalism, David S. Roh, Betsy Huang and Greta Aiyu Niu cited Pandaria and the Pandaren as an example of Asian racial stereotypes in speculative media. In their account, the depiction of an exotic, ancient Asian setting populated by non-threatening martial-arts pandas continues a tradition of presenting Asia as a place to be explored and manipulated by outsiders.

Takeo Rivera examines Mists of Pandaria in The Routledge Companion to Asian American Media, and opines that the expansion gives an explicitly Asian form to racial distinctions already present in World of Warcraft. He describes Asian-coded identities in the game as at once visible as racial categories, available for players to inhabit, and available as targets within the game world. Rivera also reads the exploration of Pandaria in relation to Euro-American traditions of imagining Asia through discovery and colonial expansion.

Douglas Eyman reviewed several of these contemporary reactions in his 2024 study of Chinese culture in video games. In Mists of Pandaria, Chinese cultural references were explicitly part of the expansion's original environments, mythology and mechanics. He described the Chinese-inspired environments of Mists of Pandaria as having generally been received more favorably than the Pandaren themselves. Eyman cited Prell's criticism of their increasingly cute appearance and also discussed an article by Tiffany Stevens of The Red & Black, who criticized the use of stylized speech, martial-arts dialogue, moustaches and simplified references to ideas such as yin and yang, spirits and ancestors. Eyman uses Mists of Pandaria as an example of glocalization, in which cultural references are built into a work with an international audience in mind rather than added later for individual markets. He contrasts this approach with earlier versions of World of Warcraft, which underwent changes when they were localized for release in China. Eyman also points to the changing appearance of the Pandaren. The early combination of pandas with Japanese samurai imagery gave way to clothing, headwear and other visual elements more closely associated with China.

In Virtually Sacred, religious-studies scholar Robert Geraci discusses Blizzard's use of Chinese mythology in connection with the popularity of World of Warcraft in China. Geraci argues that the expansion gave Chinese players a greater cultural stake in the mythology of the game.

Eyman noted that no formal study had examined Chinese players' responses to the aesthetics, mythology and narratives of Mists of Pandaria, although he cited several comments by Chinese players from online discussion boards.
