= Kael'thas Sunstrider =

Fictional character in the Warcraft franchise

- Warcraft character
- Promotional art of Kael'thas for World of Warcraft: The Burning Crusade Classic by Dmitry Prozorov.
- First appearance: Warcraft III: The Frozen Throne (2003)
- Created by: Blizzard Entertainment
- Voiced by: Quinton Flynn

In-universe information
- Alias: The Sun King
- Species: Blood elf/high elf
- Title: Prince of Quel'Thalas

Kael'thas Sunstrider, or Kael in short, is a fictional character in Blizzard Entertainment's Warcraft franchise. Introduced in the 2003 strategy game Warcraft III: The Frozen Throne, he is the last prince of the high elven kingdom of Quel'Thalas. Following the destruction of his homeland by the undead Scourge, Kael'thas reorganises most of the kingdom's survivors and calls themselves the blood elves in memory of those who had been killed. He allies with Lady Vashj and Illidan Stormrage after suffering discrimination under the human-dominated Alliance.

Initially portrayed in The Frozen Throne as an anti-hero who seeks a solution for the blood elves' dependence on magical energy, Kael'thas was later recast as a traitorous villain in World of Warcraft: he serves the demonic Burning Legion and appears as the final boss of the Tempest Keep raid in World of Warcraft: The Burning Crusade, before returning in the Magisters' Terrace dungeon. He subsequently appears in World of Warcraft: Shadowlands and as a playable character in Heroes of the Storm.

Commentary on the character has focused on the abruptness of his transition from sympathetic leader to conventional antagonist, the difficulty and social significance of his Tempest Keep encounter, and the design and balancing of his Heroes of the Storm adaptation.

== Concept and development ==
Kael'thas was introduced in Warcraft III: The Frozen Throne as the central character of the blood elf campaign. Blizzard later published concept art from his original appearance and images illustrating his visual evolution in World of Warcraft as part of a 2015 retrospective produced for his addition to Heroes of the Storm. The retrospective described his visual and gameplay identity through elaborate robes, floating verdant spheres and an emphasis on destructive fire magic.

When adapting Kael'thas into Heroes of the Storm, hero designers John Hodgson and Kent-Erik Hagman sought to reproduce what they considered the character's central fantasy while creating abilities that remained readable and controllable during play. His Verdant Spheres mechanic was initially passive, but playtesting showed that monitoring automatically generated spheres was distracting, so it was changed into an activated ability that allowed players to choose which spell to empower.

The designers also tested several versions of Kael'thas's Phoenix ability. One created an egg that had to be hatched with Flamestrike, while another made the phoenix a companion that followed the player. Both were rejected because the developers believed they lacked the scale expected of the character, leading to a version in which the phoenix travels across the battlefield and inflicts continuing area damage. Pyroblast was prevented from targeting ordinary minions after testers repeatedly selected them by accident. This reflected Blizzard's broader attempt to make heroes feel exceptionally powerful without allowing them to become statistically dominant.

Kael'thas was originally voiced in English by Quinton Flynn, who began portraying the character in Warcraft III: The Frozen Throne and continued in the role in later games. In 2021, Blizzard re-recorded Kael'thas's existing World of Warcraft dialogue with another performer for patch 9.1, including dialogue originally recorded for The Burning Crusade and Shadowlands. Contemporary reports noted that the identity of the replacement actor and Blizzard's reason for the change had not been announced.

== Appearances ==
=== Warcraft III ===
Kael'thas is introduced in Warcraft III: The Frozen Throne as a prince and member of the Kirin Tor, an organization of magicians. He returns to Quel'Thalas after the Scourge destroys the kingdom, wipes out most of its population, and corrupts the Sunwell. Kael'thas gathered most of the surviving high elves and renamed them blood elves in memory of their dead. He then leads a contingent of his people in the Alliance campaign against the Scourge, while seeking a means to alleviate his people's withdrawal symptoms due to their prolonged use of magic and the loss of the Sunwell as the source of magical power for his people.

Kael'thas and his forces are placed under the command of the human general Garithos, who assigns them dangerous missions while withholding support. When Kael'thas accepts assistance from Lady Vashj and her naga, Garithos imprisons him for treason and sentences him to death. Vashj frees Kael'thas and leads him to Outland, where he pledges himself and the blood elves to Illidan in exchange for help controlling their dependence on magical energy.

=== World of Warcraft ===
In World of Warcraft: The Burning Crusade, Kael'thas has abandoned Illidan and entered the service of the Burning Legion. He occupies the naaru fortress Tempest Keep and uses its manaforges to draw energy from the Twisting Nether. Players confront him as the final boss of the Eye, Tempest Keep's raid wing.

After his defeat, Kael'thas returns to Quel'Thalas and seizes the Isle of Quel'Danas. He attempts to use the restored Sunwell as a portal through which the demon lord Kil'jaeden can enter Azeroth, but is killed in the Magisters' Terrace dungeon before the summoning can be completed.

Kael'thas later appears in World of Warcraft: Shadowlands, where his soul is confined within Revendreth and subjected to an attempted process of rehabilitation. He assists the player and members of the Venthyr covenant against forces seeking to exploit his pride and anger.

=== Heroes of the Storm ===
Kael'thas was added to Heroes of the Storm in May 2015 as a ranged assassin specialising in fire magic and area damage. His abilities include Flamestrike, Living Bomb, Gravity Lapse, Phoenix and Pyroblast, while Verdant Spheres allows the player to empower one of his basic abilities.

== Reception and legacy ==
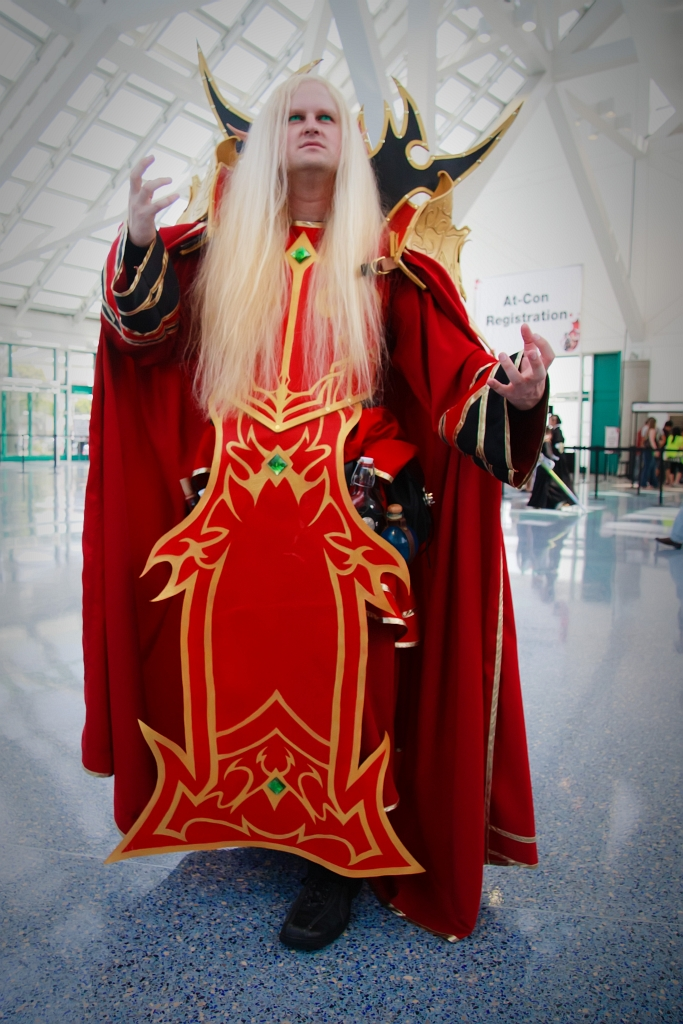
A cosplayer wearing a costume which recreates the design of Kael'thas' robe in World of Warcraft.

=== Characterization ===
Writing shortly after the release of The Burning Crusade, Elizabeth Wachowski of Engadget described Kael'thas as one of the expansion's most influential figures, but considered his apparent alliance with the Burning Legion difficult to explain. She discussed contemporary speculation that he may betray both the Legion and Illidan and use the magical energy gathered in Netherstorm to aid the blood elves.

Cass Marshall of Polygon observed in a later retrospective that Kael'thas' search for a solution to his people's dependence on magical energy was central to the early portrayal of the blood elves, but instead Blizzard had Kael'thas betray his people and submit himself fully to Kil'jaeden, transforming a prominent character in Warcraft III into an underdeveloped conventional raid boss and recurring community joke. Marshall argued that a brief Kael'thas cameo connected to blood elf heritage armour reopened longstanding community dissatisfaction with the character's abrupt reworking, which she attributed to the loss of his earlier narrative potential as a sympathetic antihero.

=== Raid encounter ===
Kael'thas's Tempest Keep battle has been discussed in studies of raiding and online cooperation. Anthropologist Alex Golub used the encounter as an example of progression in The Burning Crusade, explaining that guilds had to defeat Lady Vashj and Kael'thas before receiving access to the Battle of Mount Hyjal and, subsequently, the Black Temple. Within this structure, advancement through raid content became a measure of a guild's seriousness and collective competence.

Human–computer interaction researcher Amon Rapp used the Kael'thas encounter as a case study in temporary associations between players. One participant in Rapp's ethnographic research described weeks of failed attempts, declining guild participation and an eventual temporary merger with another guild because the fight demanded precise coordination and could collapse after a single player's death. After the combined group defeated Kael'thas, the player described the victory as the most satisfying experience of their years playing the game.

In his book World of Warcraft, Daniel Lisi similarly placed Kael'thas at a decisive point in raid progression and recalled the anti-gravity phase of the encounter as one of the specific events that former guild members continued to discuss when recounting their shared history. Lisi argued that such raid encounters acquired significance beyond their mechanics because they became collective stories about cooperation, failure and achievement.

=== Heroes of the Storm ===
Kael'thas's depiction in Heroes of the Storm received coverage for combining high area damage with a reliance on timing and team support. Kevin William "Eisenhart" Serafico Enriquez of Inquirer Esports described him as a tactical ranged assassin whose skills were designed to interact with each other and with allied slowing or stunning abilities. Enriquez praised his area damage and ability to disrupt enemy formations, but considered his low durability a substantial weakness when he was not protected by teammates.

Michael Bitton of MMORPG.com compared Kael'thas with other burst-oriented mages, observing that his delayed attacks and lack of escape abilities made positioning important. Bitton praised the adaptation for conveying the destructive quality of fire magic and considered its apparently straightforward design deceptively flexible, although he questioned how well the character would fit into the game's wider metagame.

Kael'thas also became known as a persistent balancing problem. In a retrospective on Heroes of the Storm during 2016, Hannah Dwan of PC Gamer described him as a dominant spellcaster who was difficult to balance without making him excessively powerful or ineffective. Blizzard temporarily disabled the character after a bug could remove the cost and cooldown from Living Bomb for the remainder of a match.
