= Night elf =

Fictional elven race in the Warcraft franchise

Night elves
- Warcraft race
- Promotional artwork depicting a female (left) and male (right) night elf respectively.
- First appearance: Warcraft III: Reign of Chaos (2002)
- Created by: Blizzard Entertainment
- Genre: Fantasy

A night elf (pl. night elves), sometimes capitalized as Night Elf (pl. Night Elves), is a type of fictional humanoid being in Blizzard Entertainment's Warcraft media franchise. Known as the Kaldorei (lit. 'Children of the stars') in their native language, the night elves were introduced as one of the four playable factions in the 2002 real-time strategy game Warcraft III: Reign of Chaos, and later became a playable race aligned to the Alliance faction in the massively multiplayer online role-playing game World of Warcraft. Night elves are depicted as tall, purple-skinned elves whose society is associated with forests, the moon goddess Elune and druidic nature magic. In series lore, the history of the night elf civilization is centred on Tyrande Whisperwind, its high priestess and long-serving political and military leader, and Malfurion Stormrage, the first night elf druid and founder of its druidic tradition. Other major night elf characters include Illidan Stormrage, Maiev Shadowsong and Shandris Feathermoon.

Artist Samwise Didier described the night elves' visual palette as a synthesis of various traditions of elves in popular fiction, combining lunar and dark imagery with a reverence for nature. Their design deliberately departed from the fair-skinned and blond-haired elves common in the high fantasy genre through their exaggerated height, purple skin and blue or green hair. In Warcraft III, their environmental identity was also expressed through gameplay mechanics including living tree buildings, non-destructive harvesting of lumber, and abilities affected by the game's day-and-night cycle.

The night elves have received commentary for their distinctive visual and gameplay design as well as their changing portrayal within the Warcraft media franchise, particularly following the destruction of their homeland in the plot of the expansion World of Warcraft: Battle for Azeroth. Academic analysis has examined the night elves' religious and environmental symbolism, their use of East Asian visual references and the gendered popularity of female night elf avatars.

== Concept and development ==
The night elves were created during the development of Warcraft III. Warcraft artist Samwise Didier said that Blizzard wanted to create an original variant of elves by combining two established fantasy archetypes: the moon and darkness themes associated with dark elves in Dungeons & Dragons, and the nature-oriented traditions of woodland-dwelling elves influenced by the works of J. R. R. Tolkien. The resulting race of elves was given the name "Night Elves", with purple skin, blue or green hair, and an average height of over seven feet. Didier described the concept as a difficult internal proposition because Blizzard's team was accustomed to more conventional elves resembling Legolas, with blond or brown hair. According to Didier, the public accepted the night elves more readily than many members of the development team, and a strong illustration was ultimately important in demonstrating that the unusual blue, green and purple palette could work.

The night elves' relationship with nature was incorporated into the mechanics of their playable faction in Warcraft III. Their principal structures are sentient trees that can uproot themselves, move and attack opposing units. Wisps gather lumber without destroying trees, while a Tree of Life entangles a gold mine rather than requiring workers to enter it. The faction was also designed around the day-and-night cycle introduced in Warcraft III. Female night elf units possess Shadowmeld, allowing them to become concealed while motionless at night, and several units and structures regenerate more effectively during nighttime. Their military design emphasises ranged units, mobile heroes, magical support and heavy tree creatures rather than the conventional fortifications used by other factions.

For the 2014 expansion World of Warcraft: Warlords of Draenor, Blizzard redesigned the original female night elf player model. Lead character artist Tyson Murphy said that the developers attempted to preserve the race's distinct but subtle character while increasing the model's visual detail. The revision added greater muscle definition, improved textures, ears integrated into the model's geometry and slightly pointed fingernails intended to suggest a feral quality.

== Description ==
=== Background ===
A cutscene from World of Warcraft: Battle for Azeroth depicting the longtime leaders of night elf society, Malfurion Stormrage and Tyrande Whisperwind, who is accompanied by her spirit owl companion Dori'thur.

In the Warcraft franchise's fictional history, the night elves established an ancient civilization centred on the Well of Eternity and the use of arcane magic. Their society was devastated when their Queen Azshara and her followers' use of the Well attracted the demonic Burning Legion, causing the War of the Ancients and the destruction known as the Great Sundering. Tyrande Whisperwind and brothers Malfurion Stormrage and Illidan Stormrage emerged as leading figures in the resistance to Queen Azshara and the Burning Legion, with Malfurion becoming central to the defeat of the Legion. Malfurion learned druidism from the demigod Cenarius and transmitted its practices to other night elves, while Tyrande rose to lead the priesthood of Elune.

Night elf society is organised around the relationship between the priesthood of Elune and the Cenarion order of druids. The survivors of the War of the Ancients and their descendants largely rejected arcane magic, adopted practices that harness nature magic and lived in isolation in northern Kalimdor. As Malfurion and the other druids subsequently spent long periods within the Emerald Dream, Tyrande remained responsible for governing and defending night elf society for more than ten thousand years during Malfurion's absences. Rather than ruling as a monarch, Tyrande historically exercised political and military authority through her positions as high priestess of Elune and leader of the Sentinels, while Malfurion's authority derived principally from his position within the druidic tradition.

== Appearances ==
=== Warcraft III ===
In Warcraft III: Reign of Chaos, the night elves are first encountered by the orcs after the Warsong clan begins harvesting lumber in Ashenvale. After the orcs kill the demigod Cenarius, Tyrande Whisperwind rouses Malfurion Stormrage and the druids, and releases the imprisoned Illidan Stormrage to oppose the returning Burning Legion. The night elves eventually ally with the humans and orcs at Mount Hyjal, sacrificing the immortality granted by the World Tree Nordrassil to destroy the demon Archimonde.

In Warcraft III: The Frozen Throne, Maiev Shadowsong pursues Illidan after he uses forbidden magic and allies with the naga. Tyrande and Malfurion later join the pursuit, while Illidan's actions connect the night elves to the campaigns involving Kael'thas Sunstrider, the blood elves and the war against the Lich King.

=== World of Warcraft ===
Night elves became a playable Alliance race in World of Warcraft. Their original starting areas were located on Teldrassil, a new World Tree containing their capital of Darnassus. Within the Alliance they continued to defend territories including Ashenvale and Darkshore, frequently coming into conflict with the Horde over lumber, settlement and control of northern Kalimdor.

During the events preceding World of Warcraft: Battle for Azeroth, Horde forces invade northern Kalimdor in the War of the Thorns. Warchief Sylvanas Windrunner orders Teldrassil burned, destroying Darnassus and displacing the surviving night elves. Tyrande subsequently invokes the Night Warrior, a martial aspect of Elune, and she and Malfurion lead night elf forces returning to Darkshore to fight the Horde.

In World of Warcraft: Dragonflight, the night elves help defend the newly formed World Tree Amirdrassil from the forces of the Primal Incarnate Fyrakk. After Amirdrassil enters Azeroth, they establish the settlement of Bel'ameth beneath the tree as a new home. Following another period of separation, Malfurion returns from Ardenweald and reunites with Tyrande after the defence of Amirdrassil. In the Seeds of Renewal epilogue, Tyrande and Malfurion relinquish leadership of the night elves to their adopted daughter Shandris Feathermoon, choosing to remain together in Bel'ameth after their prolonged periods of separation.

=== Other appearances ===
Night elves and night elf-derived characters have also appeared in other games in the franchise. Tyrande, Malfurion, Illidan, Maiev and Lunara appear as playable characters in the crossover multiplayer online battle arena game Heroes of the Storm, while night elf characters and locations appear on cards in the digital collectible card game Hearthstone.

== Reception and analysis ==
=== Design and gameplay ===
GameSpot's Sam Parker identified the night elves as a focus of considerable attention during testing of Warcraft III, attributing their popularity both to powerful ranged units and to their distinctive visual and gameplay style. Parker considered this a streamlined approach to resource gathering among the factors that made them one of the most interesting playable factions of Warcraft III, as it allows night elf players to establish additional bases comparatively cheaply. In a retrospective, PCGamesN described the night elves as one of the most recognisable original creations in the franchise, distinguishing them through their wild colours and elongated silhouettes as among the most recognisable visual elements of the Warcraft franchise.

Anthropologist Bonnie Nardi discussed the female night elf design in her study My Life as a Night Elf Priest. She found that female night elf and blood elf avatars were substantially more common than female dwarf and orc avatars, and that male players often selected the former because they considered them more visually attractive. Nardi interpreted looking at female avatars as a significant part of the visual experience for some male players, while observing that World of Warcraft nevertheless offered a wider range of female body types than many other games.

=== Portrayal ===
William Bainbridge identified the night elf government to be theocratic in nature, and interpreted night elf druidism as a messianic religious movement arising from the ministry of Malfurion. He characterised Malfurion as a charismatic intermediary who received the teachings of the demigod Cenarius and transmitted them to the wider night elf population. The resulting Cenarion order existed alongside the priesthood of Elune as another principal institution within night elf culture.

Cass Marshall of Polygon contrasted the night elves' depiction in Warcraft III with their later treatment in World of Warcraft. Marshall described the earlier iteration of the night elf faction as independent, dangerous and capable of confronting both the Horde and Alliance, but argued that the race steadily “lost its bite” after joining the Alliance and was increasingly assigned a supporting role. Marshall considered the Darkshore storyline in Battle for Azeroth as an attempt to restore some of the militancy and narrative focus associated with their original portrayal in Warcraft III.

Alex Ziebart of Engadget argued that later stories sometimes obscured Tyrande’s and Malfurion’s different functions. He described Tyrande as the night elves’ political and military guardian and Malfurion as a druid whose responsibilities often extended beyond night-elf or Alliance politics. William Bainbridge separately described the priesthood of Elune and the Cenarion druidic order as distinct institutions within night-elf society. Ziebart criticized portrayals that diminished Tyrande’s independent authority by subordinating her decisions to Malfurion’s. Cameron Koch of GameSpot later described the pair as one of Warcraft's defining couples and noted that, although they came to lead the night elves together in more recent storylines, Dragonflight concluded that period of leadership by having them transfer authority to Shandris Feathermoon.

Steven Messner of PC Gamer reported that the burning of Teldrassil became one of the most controversial story developments in World of Warcraft, and as a result some players vocally objected both to the deaths and displacement of the night elves and to the Horde's compulsory participation in the attack. Messner noted criticism that Blizzard's linear quest structure required Horde players to assist Sylvanas even when her actions conflicted with their understanding of the faction.

Harvey Randall of PC Gamer reported that some players objected to the settlement of Bel'ameth being accessible to Horde characters because they consider their presence inappropriate after the Horde's role in destroying Teldrassil. Other commentators interpreted the neutral city as evidence of confidence and reconciliation, while Horde visitors continued to receive an in-game warning that they were being watched by night elf Sentinels. Randall later praised Tyrande and Malfurion's reunion following the defence of Amirdrassil as one of the more effective character moments in Dragonflight. He considered Tyrande's immediate abandonment of her ordinarily stoic public demeanour when Malfurion returned an economical demonstration of the importance of their relationship, contrasting the scene favourably with the more expository and grandiose storytelling common in Warcraft storylines.

=== Cultural and mythological symbolism ===
In the MIT Press anthology Digital Culture, Play, and Identity, Tanya Krzywinska examined how the night elves' religious and environmental identity is embedded throughout the game. She cited the repeated use of crescent-moon imagery on their buildings, voice lines invoking the goddess Elune and their access to the nature-based druid class. Krzywinska argued that the combination of lunar symbolism and nature magic establishes a distinctive cosmological worldview and gives their locations and quests a mythological frame.

Esther MacCallum-Stewart used the night elves' conflict with the orcs in Warsong Gulch to analyse how World of Warcraft constructs factional warfare. The Silverwing Sentinels defend Ashenvale from the Warsong clan's logging, both to preserve the forest and to retain a strategic barrier protecting night elf settlements. The orcs, however, inhabit comparatively barren territory and require lumber to construct and defend their new homeland. MacCallum-Stewart argued that Blizzard deliberately provides both sides with plausible motivations, transforming an apparently straightforward conflict between environmental preservation and deforestation into a dispute without a clearly correct party.

Jessica Langer interpreted aspects of the night elves' presentation as drawing on stereotyped East Asian imagery, citing Japanese-style torii gates and the in-game reference to “Darnassus Kimchi”. She argued that their position within the Alliance echoed the American “model minority” stereotype: depicted as somewhat culturally separate from the dominant society, but accepted because they contributed to it positively. Langer placed this portrayal within her broader analysis of how World of Warcraft divides culturally familiar Alliance races from races presented as foreign or other.
