= Glider (bot) =

Automation tool for World of Warcraft

- Original author: Michael Donnelly
- Developers: MDY Industries, LLC
- Release: June 2005; 21 years ago
- Stable release: 1.8.0 / January 21, 2009; 17 years ago
- Operating system: Microsoft Windows 2000, XP, Vista
- Platform: .NET 2.0
- Type: Internet bot
- License: Shareware (US$25)
- Website: www.mmoglider.com

Glider, also known as WoWGlider or MMOGlider, was a bot created by MDY Industries, which interoperated with World of Warcraft. Glider automated and simplified actions by the user through the use of scripting to perform repetitive tasks while the user was away from the computer. This allowed the user to acquire in-game currency and level-ups of the character without being present to perform the required actions. As of 2008, it had sold approximately 100,000 copies. Glider was ultimately discontinued after a lawsuit was filed against MDY Industries by Blizzard Entertainment.

Glider was featured in the 2018 documentary film Play Money and its creator Michael Donnelly was a speaker at DEF CON 19.

== MDY v. Blizzard ==
While MDY Industries asserts that the software is meant to overcome design flaws in the World of Warcraft environment, Blizzard contended in a 2006 United States federal lawsuit that the program's use violated their terms of service. In July 2008, the court entered summary judgment holding MDY Industries liable for tortious interference and copyright infringement, based, in part, upon the legal premise that users of the World of Warcraft client software are licensees rather than owners of their copy of software.

Public Knowledge, a public interest group which filed an amicus brief in the case, criticized the decision, saying it makes the loading into memory of legally obtained software an act of copyright infringement subject to high statutory penalties, if the user has violated the software's license agreement in any way. The court did not hold this view and found that Glider infringed upon Blizzard's intellectual property by making an illicit copy of the World of Warcraft client in order to avoid Blizzard's anti-cheating software, Warden, and ordered MDY Industries to pay Blizzard $6,000,000. In finding this, the court agreed with Blizzard that World of Warcraft is licensed, not sold.

Following the judgment, Blizzard petitioned to enjoin MDY Industries from distributing Glider or releasing its source code. In March 2009, MDY Industries suspended Glider sales and operations pursuant to an injunction. On December 14, 2010, United States Court of Appeals for the Ninth Circuit issued its ruling. They agreed that users were licensees rather than owners of the software. They changed the ruling on copyright, stating that users were in breach of contract concerning the end-user license agreement (EULA), but that this did not constitute a violation of copyright. Nevertheless, they ruled that the bot violated the DMCA. MDY requested that the case be sent back for review, but as of August 2011, the court had yet to hear or agree to any review. MDY's owner, Michael Donnelly stated in a release on the official forums that given the manner of the ruling and the statements by the court, it was highly unlikely that MDY was going to be able to bring Glider back in any form. He stated that they were looking at their options, and that he would speak with the lawyers working the case, but due to the cost of the case it was not likely that there was much that they could do. By September 2011, mmoglider.com, the official "Glider" homepage, had vanished.

As of February 23, 2012, Blizzard acquired the domain name mmoglider.com and it is currently redirecting to a Blizzard-owned website, worldofwarcraft.com. Blizzard Entertainment also acquired ownership of four MDY Industries trademarks, including the "Glider" word mark and the corresponding logo image marks. The trademarks were cancelled in 2015 by the United States Patent and Trademark Office due to Blizzard Entertainment not renewing them.

The domain name and trademark transfers suggests that a settlement might have been reached between MDY Industries and Blizzard Entertainment. However, details of the outcome of the case have not been released by either party and legal settlements are often confidential.
