= World of Warcraft: The Burning Crusade =

2007 expansion set for World of Warcraft

- Developer: Blizzard Entertainment
- Publisher: Blizzard Entertainment
- Designers: Rob Pardo, Jeff Kaplan, Tom Chilton
- Composers: Russell Brower; Matt Uelmen; Derek Duke
- Series: Warcraft
- Platforms: Microsoft Windows, OS X
- Release: EU/NA: January 16, 2007; AU: January 17, 2007; Asia: January 16, 2007
- Genre: MMORPG
- Mode: Multiplayer

World of Warcraft: The Burning Crusade is the first expansion set for the MMORPG World of Warcraft. It was released on January 16, 2007 at local midnight in Europe and North America, selling nearly 2.4 million copies on release day alone and making it, at the time, the fastest-selling PC game released. Approximately 3.53 million copies were sold in the first month of release, including 1.9 million in North America, nearly 1.6 million in Europe, and over 100,000 copies in Australia.

== Gameplay ==
Two new playable races were added to World of Warcraft in The Burning Crusade: the Draenei of the Alliance and the Blood Elves of the Horde. Previously, the shaman class was exclusive to the Horde faction (available to the orc, troll and tauren races), and the paladin class was exclusive to the Alliance faction (available to the human and dwarf races); with the new races, the expansion allowed players to be a Draenei shaman (Alliance), and a Blood Elf paladin (Horde). The level cap was raised by ten, making it 70. In addition, a new planet, Outland, was added, with associated quests, dungeons, raids, zones, creatures, and cities.

After reaching level 70, players were able to ride flying mounts although only in Outland, not in Eastern Kingdoms or Kalimdor.

In Player versus Player (PvP) mode, a new battleground, Eye of the Storm was introduced with two brackets: one for characters between levels 61–69, and another for level 70 characters. Players are unable to summon flying mounts in this battleground. The Eye of the Storm battleground is only available to those with the expansion.

A new PvP Arena System was introduced as a way for players to fight in 2 vs 2, 3 vs 3, or 5 vs 5 death-match style battles. While the arena system allowed players without The Burning Crusade expansion to partake in skirmish matches, those without the expansion were unable to participate in rated matches, which yield rewards based on a point system. Ladder matches were only accessible to players who had reached level 70. Three arena stages were introduced in The Burning Crusade expansion, including The Ruins of Lordaeron in the Undercity, The Circle of Blood in Blade's Edge Mountains, and the Ring of Trials in Nagrand.

Arena matches have taken a more prominent role in World of Warcraft's PvP content and developed into an esport. One example of Arena matches as an electronic sport was the World Series of Video Games in 2007, where player teams competed in 3 vs 3 matches to earn cash prizes. Blizzard also holds its own seasonal tournament, the World of Warcraft Arena Tournament, which pitches teams from servers all around the world against each other. This tournament concludes with a 5v5 world final event, the first of which took place at BlizzCon ’07 and so ended season 1.

Additional "outdoor" PvP objectives were implemented, which are different for each zone in which they are located. Most of these outdoor PvP objectives involve "capturing" key points to reward players of the same faction in the area, usually with a temporary buff that adds a damage boost to player attacks or increases the rate players gain experience or faction points while the players are in the zone. For example, Terokkar Forest's PvP contest involves players standing near towers in order to capture them while defending the towers in PvP combat with players of the opposite faction that try to capture the objective. Other examples include Halaa in Nagrand and the Hellfire Fortifications in Hellfire Peninsula, where players compete for control to unlock quest and vendor access or gain factional reputation for rewards.

=== New races ===
There are two new races in this expansion: the Blood Elves for the Horde and the Draenei for the Alliance.

Blood elf — A faction of former Alliance members join the Horde in the expansion. They are led by Regent Lord Lor'themar Theron. The blood elf capital is Silvermoon City. Their racial mount is the bird-like hawkstrider and their language is Thalassian.

Blood Elves can be played as hunters, warlocks, priests, paladins, rogues, and mages.

Draenei — A faction of uncorrupted eredar join the Alliance. They are led by their prophet, Velen. The draenei capital city is the Exodar. Their racial mount is the elephant-like elekk and their language is Draenei.

The Draenei can be played as warriors, paladins, priests, shamans, hunters, and mages.

== Plot ==
The expansion's name refers to the return of the "Burning Legion"; a vast army of demons being one of the main, recurring antagonist forces in the Warcraft-universe and whose last invasion was defeated in Warcraft III: Reign of Chaos. This legion and its allies are the main enemy which players will fight against in The Burning Crusade. In addition to some new areas on Azeroth, this expansion mainly features the ravaged world of Outland which the Burning Legion and other powerful beings control.

The Doom Lord Kazzak reopened the Dark Portal to Outland, flooding Azeroth with the ravenous demons of the Burning Legion. Expeditions from the Horde and Alliance, reinforced by their new blood elf and draenei allies, passed through the gateway to stop the invasion at its source. On Outland's desiccated Hellfire Peninsula, the Alliance discovered several of their heroes who had crossed through the portal many years before, while the Horde made contact with the Mag'har (uncorrupted) orcs who had not participated in their race's original invasion of Azeroth. The expedition into Outland dragged Horde and Alliance armies further into conflict with the agents of the Legion and the lieutenants of Illidan Stormrage, who had claimed the shattered realm for his own.

=== The Black Temple ===
In his quest to reign over all of Outland, Illidan the Betrayer had established a mighty stronghold for his forces within the Black Temple, a former draenei citadel. Yet his influence began to wane after the defeat of his most trusted lieutenants, including the ruler of the Illidari Naga, Lady Vashj, and the traitorous former leader of the blood elves, Kael'thas Sunstrider. The resulting window of opportunity permitted Akama, an elder sage of devolved draenei known as the Broken, to rebel against the self-styled "Lord of Outland." Along with Illidan's former jailor, the obsessed night elf Maiev Shadowsong, Akama helped a group of heroes infiltrate Illidan's seat of power and put an end to the Betrayer's reign once and for all.

=== The Gods of Zul'Aman ===
Following years of battles alongside the old Horde, the troll warlord Zul'jin retired to the city of Zul'Aman, capital of the Amani trolls, where he called upon mysterious dark powers to rebuild his army. While the eyes of Azeroth focused on the fight against the Burning Legion and the expedition to Outland, treasure-seekers invaded Zul'Aman, rekindling Zul'jin's hatred of the outside world—particularly the high elves of Quel'Thalas. Upon hearing that these newly christened "blood elves" had become part of the Horde in his absence, the infuriated Zul'jin declared war on both Horde and Alliance. To gain the upper hand, Zul'jin attempts to awaken ancient animal gods to harness their power, but is slain by a group of heroes before his plans can come to fruition.

=== Fury of the Sunwell ===
Fresh from his defeat in Outland, Kael'thas Sunstrider returned to the blood elf city of Silvermoon. Rather than leading his people to glory as he had promised, the disgraced prince betrayed them. Kael'thas plotted to use the legendary Sunwell, source of the blood elves' magical power, to summon the demon lord Kil'jaeden into Azeroth. Aided by a joint task force of blood elves and draenei, the Shattered Sun Offensive, Horde and Alliance heroes, with the help of a dragon Kalecgos and the Sunwell's mortal form, Anveena; narrowly stopped both Kael'thas and Kil'jaeden, although Anveena sacrificed herself in the process. The draenei prophet Velen then used the naaru M'uru's energy to reignite and purify the Sunwell.

== Development ==

=== Pre-Patch ===
Before the Storm Patch 2.0.1 was released 5 December 2006 in the US on Client Version 6180

=== Worldwide release ===
Release was staggered by time zone, with players queuing outside more than 5000 brick and mortar game stores around the world as midnight approached in their local time zone. The game was released in North America, Europe, Singapore, Thailand, and Malaysia on January 16, 2007. It was released in Australasia one day later on January 17, 2007. It was later released in South Korea on February 1, 2007; in Taiwan, Hong Kong, and Macau on April 30, 2007.

The game was released in mainland China later in 2007. The delay resulted from the necessity of translation and also for visual changes required by the Ministry of Culture. The Ministry required that the Forsaken have exposed bone covered with flesh and that player death result in a tombstone rather than a corpse.

On June 28, 2011, Blizzard included the Burning Crusade expansion to all players who purchase the base game. On July 17, 2018 with the pre-patch to Battle for Azeroth, Blizzard included all expansions except the latest to all players who subscribe.

On February 19, 2021, Blizzard announced the Burning Crusade expansion for the Classic version of the game.

=== Distribution errors ===
Blizzard made a number of errors during the distribution of World of Warcraft: The Burning Crusade in Europe. One such error was the failure to register the Collector's Edition for in-game rewards. As such, players who purchased the Collector's Edition of the game would have to send numerous proofs of purchase to Blizzard by postal mail in order to redeem their in-game awards. To compensate for the additional trouble, as well as encouraging players to send in proof, Blizzard sent these players an exclusive in-game pet not found in other regions.

Only 1,600 copies were delivered to Romania, which had more than 10,000 World of Warcraft subscribers at the time.

== Soundtrack ==
The Collector's Edition of World of Warcraft: The Burning Crusade included an audio CD of the soundtrack including 21 tracks of the orchestrally recorded music, composed by Russell Brower, Derek Duke, Matt Uelmen, and Neal Acree with additional music by Brian David Farr and David Arkenstone. The soundtrack was also subsequently released for purchase through online sources, such as Apple's iTunes Store.

== Reception ==
Reception

Aggregate score
Aggregator	Score
Metacritic	91/100

Review scores
Publication	Score
1Up.com	A+
Eurogamer	8 out of 10 (1st review); 10 out of 10 (2nd review)
GameSpot	9.2 out of 10
GameSpy	5/5
GameTrailers	9/10
IGN	8.8 out of 10

The Burning Crusade received almost universal praise from critics upon release.

The specially designed new starter areas met a mixed reception from critics. On the one hand, they were felt to give a strong new perspective to existing players or a solid introduction to the game to new players. The arrangement of quests and content in these areas was felt to be more finely tuned than for existing races, with players unlikely to face grinding in order to progress and an interesting backstory being gradually revealed. It was felt that Blizzard had learned from the release of the original game, with the new content being varied without becoming overwhelming to new players, and new concepts being gradually introduced. On the other hand, reviewers felt that the new starter areas were poorly integrated with the existing world, leaving them feeling "tacked on." They were also disappointed that the new areas had a definite finish, beyond which a player would have to switch back to older content in order to progress their character. This progression didn't feel as smooth to reviewers when compared to the movement between zones for new characters from the older starting areas. The experience was also felt to be short-lived, with players being able to progress through these new areas with a couple of days' play without any new introductory dungeons to explore. It was also felt that these changes didn't address existing problems, such as the travel time between quest locations.

Like in the original, the scenery of The Burning Crusade was highly praised, being described as "occasionally breathtaking," The introductory video to the expansion was described as "hugely impressive." It was generally felt that the new Outland areas were some of the best in the game, with the size of the new areas introduced being similar to the total size of other existing games in the genre. The new starting areas were also liked, with reviewers appreciating the attention to detail in these zones. Building architecture, scenery and creatures were all singled out for mention, despite some disappointment that buildings and creatures from the original game had been "rubber stamped" into these new locations. The uniqueness of each zone, from scorched plateaus to lush forests were praised, each area being described as having its own unique feel. The various small features, such as mechanical settlements or abandoned temples were also well liked. Players were advised that they would spend a large amount of time "just staring at the scenery" in these new locations. That said, it was felt that the game was starting to show its age, with careful use of texture and lighting techniques disguising a basic underlying geometry. This was thought to follow on from the strategy in the original game, where strong art direction and careful choice of color helped to compensate for a simpler game engine, describing it as a "testament of art over technology."

The orchestral music was well received, being described as providing a "constantly changing backdrop." The new score was felt to mesh well with the original, while still providing occasional "fresh twists." The soundtracks to each of the two new starting areas were particularly praised. Reviewers were generally positive about the voice acting in the game.

World of Warcraft: The Burning Crusade was the best-selling PC game of 2007 in North America and Europe, and it is also the third fastest-selling PC game of all time (behind Wrath of The Lich King and Cataclysm), selling nearly 2.4 million copies in its first 24 hours and approximately 3.5 million in its first month. It received a "Platinum" sales award from the Entertainment and Leisure Software Publishers Association (ELSPA), indicating sales of at least 300,000 copies in the United Kingdom.

During the 11th Annual Interactive Achievement Awards, the Academy of Interactive Arts & Sciences awarded The Burning Crusade with "Massively Multiplayer Game of the Year", along with receiving a nomination for "Computer Game of the Year".
