= The Culling (Warcraft) =

Video game level in the Warcraft video game series

- Warcraft location
- Introduction screen for The Culling at the Blizzcon 2018 Warcraft III: Reforged demo
- First appearance: Warcraft III: Reign of Chaos (2002)
- Last appearance: Warcraft III: Reforged (2020)
- Created by: Blizzard Entertainment
- Genre: Real-time strategy

In-universe information
- Location: Stratholme
- Characters: Arthas Menethil; Uther Lightbringer; Jaina Proudmoore; Mal'Ganis

"The Culling" is a level in the 2002 real-time strategy game Warcraft III: Reign of Chaos, developed and published by Blizzard Entertainment. The sixth chapter of the game's human campaign, the story follows Prince Arthas Menethil as he orders the destruction of the plague-infected human city of Stratholme.

The Culling differs from the conventional campaign objective of destroying an enemy settlement in real-time strategy game missions: its mission instead presents simultaneous numerical objectives for the player and their opponent, turning the level into a race through the city as the player must kill at least one hundred residents before the demon Mal'Ganis can transform them into undead soldiers. Meanwhile, the player retains a functioning base outside Stratholme and can gather resources, construct buildings and train additional units. The level does not provide an alternative route in which the city can be saved or spared.

The scenario was adapted as the Culling of Stratholme, a five-player dungeon in the 2008 expansion for the massively multiplayer online role-playing (MMORPG) video game World of Warcraft, Wrath of the Lich King. It was later substantially redesigned for the 2020 remaster Warcraft III: Reforged, where its version of Stratholme incorporates geography and visual elements established by World of Warcraft.

Critics have identified The Culling as a turning point in Arthas's transformation from a heroic character into a villainous figure and as an example of gameplay being used to communicate narrative. Commentary has focused on the discrepancy between the player's ability to control how efficiently the massacre is performed and their inability to prevent it. The later adaptations have also been analysed for changing the player's relationship to the event, from carrying out the massacre in Warcraft III to preserving it as established history in World of Warcraft.

== Level content ==
=== Warcraft III ===
The Culling occurs during "The Scourge of Lordaeron", the human campaign of Warcraft III: Reign of Chaos, which is predominantly set in the kingdom of Loraderon. Prince Arthas and the sorceress Jaina Proudmoore pursue the necromancer Kel'Thuzad, who has distributed grain infected with a plague that kills its victims and raises them as undead. After reaching Stratholme, Arthas concludes that the contaminated grain has already been consumed and that the city's inhabitants will become part of the undead Scourge. Arthas orders his mentor, the paladin Uther the Lightbringer, to purge the city before its population can be transformed. Uther refuses to kill civilians who have not yet shown signs of infection. Arthas exerts his authority as heir apparent to the throne of Lordaeron: he declares Uther guilty of treason, suspends the Knights of the Silver Hand, and assumes direct command of the soldiers willing to follow him. Jaina also refuses to participate in the slaughter and leaves the city with Uther.

The player begins with a human base outside Stratholme and a limited military force led by Arthas. The mission objective assumes that Arthas's decision has already been made, and the player cannot refuse Arthas's order or evacuate uninfected residents while continuing the campaign. The player's choices are therefore limited to the forces they produce, the route they take through Stratholme, whether they engage Mal'Ganis and the speed with which they complete the massacre. The houses are initially neutral rather than hostile and must be manually targeted before their inhabitants who emerge from them can be attacked, with counters displaying the respective totals reached by Arthas and Mal'Ganis, who enters the city from another direction and begins converting its inhabitants into undead units. The mission ends when either side reaches one hundred victims.

The race against Mal'Ganis converts the massacre into a resource-management and optimisation problem. The player must decide how many units to retain at their base, how much time to spend fighting Mal'Ganis and how quickly to move between groups of houses. The objective therefore uses ordinary real-time strategy actions, like attacking structures, producing troops and managing multiple locations to represent an act that the surrounding narrative presents as morally catastrophic. Undead forces periodically attack the player's base, requiring the player to divide attention between defending their settlement and advancing through the city. Mal'Ganis can be temporarily defeated but returns after a short period and resumes moving between districts. If Arthas reaches one hundred victims first, Mal'Ganis retreats and challenges him to pursue the Scourge to Northrend. Arthas subsequently burns Stratholme and prepares an expedition north.

=== World of Warcraft ===
The event was recreated as the Culling of Stratholme, a five-player dungeon introduced in World of Warcraft: Wrath of the Lich King. The dungeon forms part of the Caverns of Time, through which the bronze dragonflight sends players into significant events from the past. A group of players travels to Stratholme shortly before the massacre and discovers that the Infinite Dragonflight is attempting to disrupt the established course of history.

Assisted by the bronze dragon Chromie, the players identify crates containing the infected grain and then accompany Arthas through the city. They fight undead creatures and agents of the Infinite Dragonflight while ensuring that Arthas reaches his confrontation with Mal'Ganis. The players cannot prevent the destruction of Stratholme, as their objective is to stop the Infinite Dragonflight from changing the event and destabilising the present.

The dungeon was subsequently restored in World of Warcraft: Wrath of the Lich King Classic. Blizzard promoted it as one of the expansion's "seminal" five-player dungeons when announcing the re-release.

=== Reforged ===
The version released in Reforged retains the original objective of reaching one hundred victims before Mal'Ganis. It replaces the original city map with a larger and more detailed representation of Stratholme and adds new enemy encounters within some buildings; the human base is repositioned; the route through the city is altered; and the introductory scene is restaged using the remaster's character models and environmental design.

The Reforged version changed the direction from which Arthas enters Stratholme and introduced landmarks associated with its later appearance in World of Warcraft, including the city gates, the Bastion of the Silver Hand and Alonsus Chapel. The remade level also incorporated Meathook, an enemy introduced in the World of Warcraft dungeon.

== Development ==
In a retrospective history published by Ars Technica, level designer David Fried said that he selected The Culling while the campaign team was distributing missions among its designers. Fried considered the premise of killing citizens in an attempt to protect the wider population a compelling narrative problem that could be expressed through unusual game mechanics. The designers developed the campaign missions around the narrative framework and dialogue supplied by creative director Chris Metzen, iterating between story requirements and possible map objectives.

Shortly after the original game's release, Blizzard executive Bill Roper selected The Culling as his favourite mission in Warcraft III. He said that its success condition, killing one hundred residents constitutes victory within the level, differed from a typical real-time-strategy scenario and identified it as both a major turning point in Arthas’s story and a distinct gameplay challenge.

At the 2010 Game Developers Conference, lead designer Rob Pardo used The Culling to illustrate Blizzard's principle of "play, don't tell". Pardo contrasted the mission with narrative delivered primarily through exposition: rather than only being informed that Arthas must prevent the infected population from joining the Scourge, the player is required to carry out the action through the mission's objective.

=== Adaptation ===
Blizzard art lead Brian Sousa explained that the original Stratholme contained features, including classical columns, statues, a river and a zoo, which did not resemble the city later familiar to World of Warcraft players. For the World of Warcraft adaptation of the story arc, the team redesigned the map around the later version rather than reproducing the 2002 layout with only higher-resolution graphics.

In November 2018, Blizzard announced Warcraft III: Reforged at BlizzCon as a recreation of Reign of Chaos and its expansion, Warcraft III: The Frozen Throne. The company promoted rebuilt graphics, modernised animation, revised in-game cinematics and a renewed World Editor. The Culling was selected as the playable campaign demonstration at the convention and appeared in promotional footage showing the redesigned characters, city and opening confrontation between Arthas, Uther and Jaina.

== Reception and analysis ==
=== Critical reception ===
Matt Porter of Vice included the mission among the greatest moments in Blizzard's history. He identified the shock of being required to control a character associated with justice while killing ostensibly innocent civilians as the reason the sequence remained memorable to him. Rob Zacny, also writing for Vice, regarded The Culling as the decisive point in Arthas's narrative and as an example of the enduring strength of the game's campaign.

Richard Scott-Jones of PCGamesN described the Culling of Stratholme as one of gaming's most frequently discussed stories. Reviewing Reforged, however, he found the mission itself somewhat anticlimactic and questioned whether the remaster's revised presentation matched what Blizzard had demonstrated before release.

=== Player complicity and moral agency ===
Zacny argued that the timed objective encourages players to concentrate on the procedural challenge of killing the city's inhabitants. The urgency of competing with Mal'Ganis can prevent reflection on the meaning of the player's actions until the mission is already underway or complete. For Zacny, this makes the player an active participant in Arthas's brutality rather than a passive witness to his transformation. The mission does not offer a branching moral choice; Instead, the player exercises tactical agency within an outcome that the story has predetermined. Zacny interpreted this limitation as directing attention towards Arthas's readiness to abandon restraint when he believes violence is expedient, rather than presenting his later corruption as a sudden change imposed entirely by external forces.

Porter similarly emphasised the conflict between the player's prior understanding of Arthas as a heroic paladin and the action they are required to perform. He considered the effect especially forceful because the game transfers control back to the player after the confrontation with Uther and Jaina, requiring them to implement the decision rather than merely watch its consequences in a cinematic.

=== Adaptation and remaster ===
Victor Cayres and Adolfo Duran examined the Culling of Stratholme dungeon as an example of World of Warcraft presenting an established event from another playable perspective. In Warcraft III, the player directly controls Arthas and conducts the massacre. In the later dungeon, players instead accompany him and prevent the Infinite Dragonflight from changing the past. Cayres and Duran argued that the adaptation turns the event into fixed history: players can revisit and participate in it, but their role is to preserve rather than alter its outcome.

Yoon Seo-ho of Korean publication Inven played a demonstration version of The Culling in 2019 and observed that its route through the city and available districts differed substantially from the original. He found that restrictions on the units available from the player's base changed his tactics, while additional named enemies and the revised placement of Mal'Ganis increased the sense that the two forces were competing throughout Stratholme. Yoon cautioned that the version he played remained a demonstration build rather than the completed release.

In his dissertation on remastered media, Alexander Williams Miller used The Culling as one of two principal levels in a comparison of the original and Reforged. Miller regarded the mission as Blizzard's demonstration of the remaster's proposed graphical, mechanical and continuity changes. He observed that the restaged confrontation between Arthas and Uther changed the positioning, lighting and relationship of the characters within the scene, making their expressions and physical separation more visible. Miller nevertheless experienced poorer technical performance while playing the Reforged version, including intermittent slowdown when moving the camera and controlling units. He interpreted the contrast between the detailed models and the limited changes made elsewhere in the remaster as part of its failure to satisfy the expectations created by the 2018 demonstration.

Scott-Jones likewise contrasted the ambitious presentation of The Culling at BlizzCon with the more restrained cinematics and continuity changes in the released game. Cho Young-jun of GameDonga similarly found that the demonstration combined newly modelled characters and environmental effects with the original Korean voices, attack animations and sound effects. He regarded the mixture as providing a visually modernised version of the mission while preserving recognisable elements of the original presentation.
