= WC3 =

WC3 may stand for:

- Wing Commander III: Heart of the Tiger, a 1994 space combat simulation computer and video game
- Warcraft III: Reign of Chaos, a 2002 real-time strategy computer game
  - Warcraft III: The Frozen Throne, expansion pack to Reign of Chaos
  - Warcraft III: Reforged, the remastered of edition for both Warcraft III: Reign of Chaos and The Frozen Throne
- A common misspelling of W3C, World Wide Web Consortium
- Wayne County Community College District, community college in the Detroit area
