= Warcraft III Reforged: Forsaken Kingdom =

- Developer: Blizzard Entertainment
- Publisher: Blizzard Entertainment
- Series: Warcraft
- Platforms: Microsoft Windows, macOS
- Release: September 12, 2026
- Genre: Real-time strategy
- Mode: Single-player

Warcraft III Reforged: Forsaken Kingdom is an expansion for Blizzard Entertainment's 2020 real-time strategy game Warcraft III: Reforged. It was announced during the opening ceremony of BlizzCon 2026 on September 12, 2026, and released through Battle.net the same day. It contains the first new official single-player campaign for Warcraft III since the release of The Frozen Throne in 2003.

== Gameplay ==
Forsaken Kingdom consists of two campaign components: the four-mission prologue The Last Days of Lordaeron and the main Forsaken Kingdom campaign. The prologue uses a comparatively traditional and linear Warcraft III mission structure, while the main campaign adopts a semi-open single-player role-playing structure inspired by the Rexxar bonus campaign in The Frozen Throne. The latter places greater emphasis on exploration and persistent hero development, with an expanded inventory, equipment slots, hero kits and talent systems.

Blizzard described the two campaigns as containing approximately 30 hours of gameplay and nearly an hour of in-game cinematics. The expansion launched alongside patch 3.0 for Reforged, which introduced a third graphics option called Definitive Edition, increased the maximum selection group from 12 units to 24, and updated the World Editor. The patch also added the Forsaken Paladin as a Tavern hero. Its multiplayer version was made available to Reforged players without requiring purchase of the campaign.

== Synopsis ==
The story is set between Arthas Menethil's return to Lordaeron and the establishment of the Undercity, occupying part of the approximately four-year narrative gap between Warcraft III and World of Warcraft. It depicts the emergence of the Forsaken as an independent society and their establishment of a base beneath the ruins of Lordaeron.

The Last Days of Lordaeron presents the kingdom's fall from the perspective of members of the Capital City Guard after Arthas returns home. Its locations include the Capital City of Lordaeron, the underground areas that later become part of the Undercity, Andorhal and Stratholme following its culling. The main campaign follows newly risen Forsaken warrior Garek Bandarion and Dark Ranger Anya. Their story intersects with established characters including Sylvanas Windrunner, Putress, Varimathras, Sally Whitemane, Renault Mograine, Arthas, Kel'Thuzad and Baron Rivendare, while depicting conflicts involving the Forsaken, the Scarlet Crusade and the Scourge.

== Development and release ==
The expansion was developed by Blizzard Entertainment's RTS/RPG group. Brad Chan served as project lead, David Ok as art director and Sam Kim as design director. During its BlizzCon presentation, Blizzard also discussed the influence of the Warcraft III custom-content community on the project and highlighted Hive Workshop creators Alexandros Delas, Luca Pasqualini, Spas Petrov and Ole Jesper Oliver Dahl and their previous custom projects.

Forsaken Kingdom was announced during the BlizzCon 2026 opening ceremony on September 12 and released immediately afterward. The expansion was priced at US$29.99 in the United States at launch and requires ownership of Warcraft III: Reforged. Blizzard also offered a bundle containing both the base game and the campaign. An internet connection, a Battle.net account and the Battle.net desktop application are required to access the expansion.

Patch 3.0 also changed the networking requirements of the Reforged client. PC Gamer reported that the updated client requires an internet connection even for single-player play and no longer supports local-area-network multiplayer. Offline and LAN functionality remain available through the separate legacy Warcraft III client included with Reforged, but the Forsaken Kingdom campaign itself runs through Reforged.

== Reception ==
In a review in progress published around the expansion's release, IGN's Len Hafer described the prologue as an ambitious return to Warcraft III single-player mission design and noted that the main campaign incorporated substantially more role-playing elements. She was critical of some close-up textures and lighting in the Definitive Edition graphics mode, while finding that its unit and building designs more closely resembled the visual character of the original game when viewed at normal gameplay distances.

PC Gamer focused separately on changes introduced by patch 3.0. Ted Litchfield criticized the introduction of an always-online requirement for the Reforged client and the removal of its LAN mode, particularly given the importance of offline and local multiplayer to the original game's history. The article also cited the Definitive Edition graphics option and the increase in the unit-selection limit as notable additions in the update.
