= Legion TD =

Auto battler video games

Legion TD is a tower defense video game series. The Legion TD 1 was a Warcraft III: The Frozen Throne player-made mod, released by Lisk in the late 2000s. The second generation is a standalone game that retains most of the first game's mechanics, with only minor content changes.

== Legion TD 1 ==
The first-generation Legion TD is a player-made map created using the Warcraft III World Editor, released by Lisk in the late 2000s and then open-sourced. It was localized into Chinese and updated by Su Shui.

The in-mod characters come from Warcraft III. The game supports 2, 4, 6, and 8 players, split into two teams to compete against each other. It combines PvP and tower defense elements, uses a turn-based format, and allows players within the same round to spend gold to deploy soldiers to defend an immobile king; and to spend lumber to deploy soldiers to attack the enemy king. Gold can also be used to buy lumber-harvesting wisps, and lumber can also be used to upgrade the king's own armaments.

== Legion TD 2 ==
Legion TD 2 is a standalone game developed by New Zealand game company AutoAttack Games, released on 20 November 2017. It no longer requires Warcraft III as a platform. It retains the first game's gameplay, but replaces lumber with “Mythium”. The game has 8 factions, each with 6 different unit types.
