= Warcraft: The Board Game =

2003 spin-off board game

- Designers: Kevin Wilson
- Publishers: Fantasy Flight Games
- Publication: 2003
- Players: 4

Warcraft: The Board Game is a board game adaptation of the Warcraft series of computer games, created by Kevin Wilson and released in 2003 by Fantasy Flight Games. It takes elements primarily from Warcraft III: Reign of Chaos, but also incorporates elements from Warcraft III: The Frozen Throne.

Up to four players may play this game, with each player taking on one of the four playable factions from Warcraft III: The Humans, Orcs, Night Elves, and Undead. Team play is also possible, with the Human and Night Elf players forming the Alliance while the Orc and Undead players forming the Horde. Though the game uses a standard setup, scenario-based gameplay is also possible, and sample scenarios and parts required for them are provided with the game.

== Gameplay ==
The game board is a modular board, allowing players to freely design the shape and size of the game board. Depicted on each piece is a collection of hexes. Some hexes contain gold mines, some lumber, some mountains, and some are strategic locations that are worth victory points. Finally, each map contains a hex containing a player's town hall. At the town hall hex, each player begins with a small supply of workers, military units, and some gold and lumber. Gold and lumber are the two main resources of Warcraft: The Board Game, as with Warcraft III. Similarly, workers are used to harvest resources, which are used to build units and buildings, which are then used to raise an army and defeat opposing forces. Each player also begins the game with an Experience Card deck, which is unique to each player.

The game proceeds in turns, with each turn divided into four phases:

- In the Move phase, players move the units on the board: flying units and workers may move up to two hexes while other units may only move one. Hexes with mountains, however, are impassible to all except flying units. Units must stop when they enter a hex containing enemy forces, in which case combat occurs. Up to three workers and three military units (from one side, in a team game) may occupy one hex at any time.
- In the Harvest phase, workers present at a gold mine or lumber site produce gold and lumber. When harvesting, players must roll a special resource die for each worker to determine how many resources are produced. If a worker produces more than two of a resource, then the resource is depleted; if this occurs twice, then the hex ceases to produce resources for the rest of the game. Workers need not harvest resources when at a resource-producing site, as workers may be saved for building construction, which occurs later in the turn.
- In the Deploy phase, players may place any units built in the previous turn on the board. Players also complete any buildings that began construction in a previous turn. Players are not obligated to place all their units or complete any of their buildings. Units are placed at either the player's town hex, or at an outpost, which are built by workers in the field.
- In the Spend phase, players contribute resources for the production of units, buildings, and outposts. Outposts allow units to be deployed at a forward position, and may be built by any worker at its present location (though, if building on a resource-producing hex, the worker must not have been used during the Harvest phase). Buildings allow the training of a greater quantity of units, and are built by workers present in the town hex. In both cases, the workers are considered "occupied" until a later Deploy phase, when they are then freed. Units may be upgraded to a more powerful unit during the Spend phase, which improves their effectiveness in combat.

=== Units ===
There are three different types of military units in Warcraft: The Board Game: melee units, ranged units, and flying units. Workers and military units are all built during the spend phase, and are put on the board at a later Deploy phase. At the start of the game, each player has one building allowing the building of one worker per turn, as well as another building allowing the building of one melee unit per turn. When built, units occupy the building, and as such the building cannot produce additional units until the unit occupying the building is deployed onto the game board. To produce additional units, additional buildings must be built.

Each military unit has a specific strength statistic; upgrading units increases their strength.

If, during the Move phase, units of opposing factions occupy the same hex, battle occurs. All units in the hex, and any neighboring hexes, are considered to be involved in the battle; in a team game, allied units nearby may contribute any or all units to the battle. At the start of a battle, all parties involve draw one card from their Experience Card deck; these may be used at a later point for special effects both in and out of battle. Battle consists of three phases: ranged units attack first, followed by flying units, and melee units. At the end of each phase, casualties inflicted by the particular type of unit are removed from the board before the next phase begins. In addition, flying units cannot be made casualties during the melee battle phase. To determine whether a unit inflicts casualties, one die is rolled for each unit; a roll with a value less than or equal to the player's strength rating for the particular type of unit is considered a hit. Combat continues until the contested hex (not any adjacent hex) is empty or entirely controlled by one side; the winning player draws one Experience Card as a reward (if the battle is a draw, neither player draws an Experience Card).

Any workers or outposts belonging to the defeated side that remain in the contested hex are removed from the board.

=== Game End ===
A player is considered eliminated if opposing forces occupy their own town hex for two consecutive turns (players may continue to build the first turn after their own town hex is occupied by enemy forces, but they immediately enter a combat situation when deployed and cannot be moved away), when all of their units, workers, and outposts are removed from the board. A player wins if all of their opponents are eliminated.

Players may also win on victory points: strategic locations on the board (which include a player's own town hex), if occupied, award victory points. Three cards in each player's experience decks also award victory points, and upgrading any type of unit to its highest level awards one victory point. Players immediately win the game if they accumulate 15 victory points (30 in a team game).

== Expansion ==
An expansion for Warcraft: The Board Game was released in 2004, which adds additional game mechanics familiar to Warcraft III players to the board game. Additional mechanics added include heroes, summoned units, and creeps.
