= World of Warcraft: Mists of Pandaria =

2012 expansion set for World of Warcraft

- North American box art
- Developer: Blizzard Entertainment
- Publisher: Blizzard Entertainment
- Director: Tom Chilton
- Designers: Tom Chilton; Cory Stockton; Greg Street; Ion Hazzikostas
- Composers: Neal Acree; Russell Brower; Jeremy Soule
- Series: Warcraft
- Platforms: Microsoft Windows, OS X
- Release: NA/EU: September 25, 2012
- Genre: MMORPG
- Mode: Multiplayer

World of Warcraft: Mists of Pandaria is the fourth expansion set for the massively multiplayer online role-playing game (MMORPG) World of Warcraft, following Cataclysm. The World of Warcraft: Mists of Pandaria expansion pack was announced by Blizzard Entertainment game designer Chris Metzen at BlizzCon 2011 on 21 October 2011, and was released on 25 September 2012.

Mists of Pandaria raised the existing level cap from level 85 to 90. It introduced a new character class, the monk, along with a new playable race, the pandaren, which are humanoid pandas. The vanity pet system was overhauled and a pet battle system was added. Scenarios were introduced, and Challenge Modes were added for dungeons. The existing talent trees were replaced by a new system of tiered talents awarded every 15 levels. The initial patch included nine new dungeons, three new raids, two new battlegrounds and one new arena. Subsequent patches introduced the Brawler's Guild and heroic versions of the scenarios. Several additional raids, dungeons, a new battleground, and a new arena were also added.

The expansion draws heavily from Asian (especially Chinese) imagery and folklore.

== Gameplay ==
=== Monk class ===
Monks use an energy source to power basic abilities like Jab. The basic Jab attack is used to generate a resource called "Chi", which are then used for more advanced attacks. The monk class was originally announced with not being able to utilize an auto-attack like the other classes, however, the developers chose to forgo this idea and they have been given an auto-attack. The monk class has three specializations: Brewmaster (tanking), Windwalker (melee damage), and Mistweaver (healing). Monks' healing specialization is capable of healing allies through dealing damage to enemies, as well as through "proximity" based heals, and by dropping statues, similar to a shaman totem, that pulse healing as they perform attacks on the enemy target. Choosing the healing specialization gives the monk a mana bar like other healers while the tank and damage spec uses an energy bar. Monks make use of leather armor, and every race may play as a monk. An 11th character slot was added on the release of Monks, allowing a player to have one of each class on the same server.

In the Legion expansion, Mistweaver monks lost the Chi resource and the Fistweaving talent that allowed them to heal by dealing damage. This converted Mistweaver monks into a standard healing class that directly heals allies through the use of a mana resource bar.

=== Pandaren race ===
The pandaren—a race of anthropomorphic giant pandas initially created by veteran Blizzard artist Samwise Didier as an April Fools' style joke—were later reintroduced to the Warcraft canon in the bonus Horde campaign of Warcraft III: The Frozen Throne. Unlike previous races in World of Warcraft, which are tied to either the Horde or Alliance in-game factions, pandaren are faction-neutral for the early levels of the game. Until the end of the principal quest line on the Wandering Isle, the pandaren player character is faction-less; at the end of their starting experience, the player chooses to align with either the Horde or the Alliance. The pandaren speak both the pandaren language (though the factional language barrier will still remain between Horde and Alliance pandaren) and the main languages of their faction, which are Common (Alliance) and Orcish (Horde). (In an interview with Kat Hunter, Chris Metzen jokingly said the languages had not yet been chosen but Pig Latin was a strong candidate.) The classes available to pandaren characters are Hunter, Monk, Mage, Priest, Rogue, Shaman, Warlock, Warrior, and Death Knight.

=== New instances ===
In 2011 it was revealed that the new instances would include Temple of the Jade Serpent, Stormstout Brewery and Shado-Pan Monastery. It was later revealed that the 4 parts of Scarlet Monastery – Library, Graveyard, Armory and Cathedral – would be merged into two heroics in Mists of Pandaria. A heroic version of Scholomance was also announced. During the Mists of Pandaria press release, it was announced that there would be nine level 90 heroics for players as well as three raids with 16 raid bosses. All of the raids have three difficulties (Heroic, Normal, and Looking for Raid).

=== Challenge Modes ===
Mists of Pandaria introduced Challenge Modes, a gameplay option where a dungeon group is challenged to finish a dungeon of increased difficulty as quickly as possible. All players' gear is normalized, allowing for fair ranking. Depending on how quickly the group clears the dungeon, the group will earn one of three possible medals. The higher the medal quality, the higher the prize for achieving that medal.

=== Pet Battle System ===
Introduced with the expansion, the pet battle system allows non-combat vanity pets to be pitted in battle against each other in a turn-based combat system, either against wild pets or other players' pets. Defeating wild pets allows players to capture them, adding to their collection and their pet journal. Pets can be trained up to a maximum level of 25, with new abilities and enhanced stats granted as they progress. Players are able to seek out master pet trainers and battle their pets, with daily rewards if the player defeats them. All information regarding pet levels, abilities, and battles is tracked in the Pet Journal.

There are 10 possible pet classes, each with its own strengths and weaknesses.

=== Scenarios ===
Mists of Pandaria also included a new 3 player instance mode, called Scenarios. Playable on either normal or heroic difficulty, they are short stories players can play through and earn rewards at the end. The stories are mostly relevant to the Horde and Alliance storylines in Pandaria. Scenarios have different stages, and the players receive different tasks for each stage. During a heroic scenario, the players can attempt to complete a timed objective for an extra reward. The scenario mode doesn't require anyone to queue as a role, and it's up to the group what composition they want to run with.

=== Flexible Raids ===
In patch 5.4, a new raid setting was introduced with the Siege of Orgrimmar raid, called Flexible. In it, players would assemble a pre-made group of 10 to 25 players, and the difficulty of the raid would automatically scale accordingly. This setting is intended to be more challenging than the Raid Finder setting, but not as difficult as the Normal or Heroic modes, and groups can be formed across realms (cross realm group forming was later added for normal and heroic difficulties).

== Plot ==
With Deathwing's menace ended, Warchief Garrosh Hellscream seized the opportunity to strike at the Alliance and expand the Horde's territory on Kalimdor. His assault completely obliterated the human city of Theramore, causing worldwide violence between the factions to erupt anew. A destructive naval skirmish left Alliance and Horde forces washed ashore on the fog-shrouded island of Pandaria, which had appeared in the open sea, defying modern maps and charts. As both warring factions established footholds on the resource-rich continent, they made contact with the noble pandaren, one of its most prolific peoples. This ancient race worked with the Alliance and Horde in the hopes of dispersing the Sha: dark, ephemeral beings roused from beneath Pandaria by the bloody conflict.

=== Landfall ===
The conflict between the Horde and the Alliance escalates in Pandaria as both factions deploy forces across the continent. Garrosh Hellscream sends troops to locate the Divine Bell, an ancient mogu artifact that can enhance the power of his soldiers. His actions contribute to the growing unrest within the Horde, including conflict with the Darkspear trolls and the removal of the blood elves from Dalaran. After Garrosh obtains the bell, Prince Anduin Wrynn and SI:7 continue to follow his movements. Anduin eventually confronts Garrosh at Kun-Lai Summit, where the Divine Bell is destroyed.

=== The Thunder King ===
While war between the Horde and the Alliance raged across Pandaria, the scattered mogu plotted a return to their terrible former glory. They rekindled their historical alliance with the Zandalari trolls, who managed to resurrect the tyrannical mogu emperor, Lei Shen the Thunder King, in the hopes of restoring mogu dominion over the continent. The valiant Shado-pan rushed to suppress their enemies, creating a task force, the Shado-pan Assault, originally composed of pandaren warriors and later supported by heroes of the Horde and Alliance. These fearless champions strove to defeat the Thunder King, though they also simultaneously served their factions' interests on Pandaria. Jaina Proudmoore led the Kirin Tor Offensive on a quest to uncover the source of all mogu power (and keep it from the Horde), and Lor'themar Theron took the Sunreaver Onslaught in search of mighty mogu weaponry to aid a daring plan: an insurrection against Warchief Garrosh Hellscream.

=== Escalation ===
Garrosh Hellscream's quest for power in Pandaria leads him to excavate part of the sacred Vale of Eternal Blossoms in search of a sinister artifact, a decision that puts the Horde at odds with the Shado-pan and other influential pandaren. Meanwhile, in the Horde capital of Orgrimmar, Chieftain Vol'jin and the Darkspear trolls are declared traitors and hunted by the Kor'kron, Hellscream's personal guard. Vol'jin's people retreat to Durotar and the Barrens to gather supplies and reinforcements for their counter-strike, relying on the support of their former warchief, Thrall, and a particularly tenuous pact with the Alliance, whose interest in ending Garrosh's rule may not bode entirely well for the Horde...

=== Siege of Orgrimmar ===
Garrosh Hellscream obtains the heart of the dead Old God Y'Shaarj from beneath the Vale of Eternal Blossoms and uses its power as a weapon, causing further descruction in the region. He also turns against other members of the Horde and forms a predominantly orcish force known as the "True Horde", based in Orgrimmar. Garrosh intents to use the force to defeat the Alliance and expand his control across Azeroth. After the Vale is purified, the player's faction moves against Garrosh.

Leaders of the Alliance and Horde lay siege to Hellscream's capital in order to topple the ruthless Warchief. The leaders of Azeroth then agree to prosecute Garrosh for war crimes in Pandaria. Vol'jin, for his contributions in Garrosh's downfall, is chosen as the new warchief of the Horde. King Varian Wrynn decides to end the conflict with the Horde but warns them that the Alliance will return to end them should they return to their honorless warmongering ways.

== Setting ==
The expansion draws heavily on Asian (especially Chinese) imagery and folklore.

The game is set after the events of Deathwing (noted black dragon) and the Cataclysm. The major setting is the titular land of Pandaria, one of the continents of the world of Azeroth. Discovery of Pandaria is made after a naval battle between the Horde and the Alliance. It had previously been hidden by magic since The Sundering, only to reappear for unknown reasons.

=== Pandaria ===
Pandaria is a new continent located to the south of the Eastern Kingdoms and Kalimdor. Several zones have been added, including the Jade Forest, Valley of the Four Winds, Vale of Eternal Blossoms, Townlong Steppes, Kun-Lai Summit, Krasarang Wilds, the Timeless Isle, and the Dread Wastes. The Jade Forest is the first zone, and the entry point for the Alliance and Horde. It features lush rainforest and stone spires, and introduces the player to the hozen and jinyu races. It contains the Temple of the Jade Serpent (one of the new dungeons), and introduces the Sha enemy. The Valley of the Four Winds includes pandaren farm lands, with a coastal jungle. The Stormstout Brewery, another new dungeon, is located in the valley. There are auction houses scattered across the five zones of Pandaria. Along with these normal auction houses, a "black market" auction house is located in an area north of the Valley of the Four Winds called the Veiled Stair. Unlike the player controlled auction house, this auction house is controlled by NPCs who post items, usually of rare status or those that have been removed from the game in previous expansions. Both Horde and Alliance can use the black market auction house. As you travel throughout Pandaria it will be common to encounter Lorewalker Cho who is searching Pandaria for the various secrets and lore that the land possess. Once the player hits level 90 and travels into the Vale of Eternal Blossoms, the player can talk to Lorewalker Cho and his team of Lorewalkers. The player will be tasked with seeking out the "Lore objects" scattered about Pandaria in order to gain more reputation.

==== The Wandering Isle ====
The Wandering Isle is a new zone, serving as the starting area for pandaren players, which they leave after choosing a faction (horde or alliance). The Isle itself is in fact a roaming giant sea turtle named Shen-zin Su. The turtle's origins lie with the pandaren explorer Liu Lang, who was overcome with wanderlust, a rare trait in the pandaren of that time. Because of this he departed the pandaren continent of Pandaria around 10,000 years ago, riding on the back of the then man-sized turtle, Shen-zin Su. Lui Lang later returned to his homeland a few times, and each time the turtle had become progressively bigger. By the time players encounter Shen-zin Su, the turtle has grown to the size of a small continent, complete with fertile farmlands, mountains, lakes and a thriving population of pandaren, animals and plant life. In addition to serving as a home and method of transportation for his inhabitants, Shen-zin Su is a fully sapient being and quite aware of the Wandering Isle pandaren that have been living on his back for generations. The zone also features a training academy and a central temple.

=== Creatures and enemies ===
Pandaria plays host to several new races that the players will encounter. Besides the pandaren there are the jinyu, a wise, fish-like race, the passionate, monkey-like hozen, the yaungol, fierce ancestors of the tauren, the virmen, a pesky rabbit-like race, the grummels, a friendly race related to troggs, the highly aggressive reptilian sauroks, and the mantids, a fearsome insectoid race. Players will also encounter the mogu, who were the first to inhabit and conquer Pandaria, and the Sha, who are "the manifestation of negative energy on Pandaria".

== Development ==
MMO-Champion reported the possibility of Mists of Pandaria being the new expansion title based on a trademark application by Blizzard submitted on July 28, 2011 and approved August 2, 2011 trademarking the title "Mists of Pandaria". Blizzard announced also that in this expansion Garrosh Hellscream will become increasingly unstable and the two factions will ultimately team up to take him down in The Siege of Orgrimmar.

Mists of Pandaria is the first version of World of Warcraft or its expansions to have a digital deluxe edition (DDE), which essentially provides the in-game rewards of a collector's edition at a somewhat reduced cost and without the extra materials, such as the artbook and the soundtrack. Like the collector's edition of Cataclysm, both the DDE and the standard Mists of Pandaria collector's edition provide special in-game portraits for StarCraft II: Wings of Liberty, and also unlocks special icons for the player's banner in Diablo III.

On March 21, 2012, Blizzard released the Mists of Pandaria beta for testing. On July 20, 2012, the PTR (Public Test Realm) for Mists of Pandaria was opened, slated to be the final testing space before the release of the expansion.

On August 16, 2012, Blizzard unveiled the Mists of Pandaria opening cinematic.

Academic Douglas Eyman cites the expansion as an example of glocalization because it was designed at the outset to appeal to global audiences while celebrating Chinese culture.

== Reception ==
Reception

Aggregate score
Aggregator	Score
Metacritic	82/100

Review scores
Publication	Score
Eurogamer	8/10
G4	4.5/5
Game Informer	9.5/10
GameSpot	7.5/10
GameSpy	4/5
GamesRadar+	4/5
GameTrailers	8.8/10
IGN	8.7/10
PC Gamer (UK)	82/100

The expansion received generally positive reviews, scoring an 82 out of 100 on Metacritic.

During the 16th Annual D.I.C.E. Awards, the Academy of Interactive Arts & Sciences nominated Mists of Pandaria for "Outstanding Achievement in Original Music Composition".

=== Sales ===
On October 4, 2012, Blizzard had announced that 2.7 million copies of Mists of Pandaria had been sold within the first week of its release (Cataclysm sold 3.3 million copies within the first 24 hours of its release), with the global subscriber base passing 10 million subscribers. As estimated by Carol Pinchefsky from Forbes.com, digital sales of the game outnumbered the retail sales by nearly 4:1 in the first week of sales.

Subsequent comments by reviewers acknowledged that the sales of nearly 3 million in the first week would be desirable and an indicator of success for any other company in the gaming industry, but the reviewers said these numbers "still aren't looking good for the long-term future of Blizzard's wildly successful MMORPG" and "likely left some of the team at Activision Blizzard wondering where they went wrong". Pandaria's start has been slower than any other WoW expansion, with both Wrath of the Lich King and Cataclysm selling more copies in the first 24 hours than Pandaria did in its first week.

As of October 14, 2014, Mists of Pandaria is included for free with the base game, similar to previous expansions.
