= Tauren =

Fictional race

- Warcraft race
- Male (right) and female (left) versions of the Tauren
- First appearance: Warcraft III: Reign of Chaos; 2002
- Created by: Blizzard Entertainment
- Genre: Fantasy

The Tauren are a fictional race of anthropomorphic bovines in the Warcraft franchise developed by Blizzard Entertainment. They were first introduced in the 2002 Warcraft III, soon afterwards becoming a playable race in the 2004 World of Warcraft. Members of the Horde faction, a major political alliance in the main location of the game, they are a gentle and peaceful race that chooses to live in harmony with nature, but are terrifyingly powerful when provoked.

== Background and appearances ==
Tauren are very large in size compared to humans, with males reaching up to 10 feet tall and females, 9 feet. Their hands have three fingers, while their feet are hooves. Males are bulky, muscular and covered in fur with cow-like colors and patterns. They have a hunched posture, hairy mane, and horned head. While female Tauren are still bulky, they are noticeably slimmer and more upright in posture, with smaller manes.

In combat, the Tauren's trademark weapon is the totem pole, which they use both for religious meditation purposes and as a club-type weapon. An additional signature weapon is the Tauren halberd, which utilize wooden handles and massive blades.

The Tauren were first introduced in Warcraft III as the "Tauren warrior" class, and were powerful characters in melee combat. In World of Warcraft, the city of Thunder Bluff was introduced as their capital. In the 2015 MOBA Heroes of the Storm, a character named the Tauren Chieftain appears, who is an electric guitar-playing Tauren who is a member of a rock band, and a playable character in-game. The Highmountain Tauren, a group of Tauren with elk-like antlers, were introduced with the 2016 expansion World of Warcraft: Legion.

== Development ==
The Tauren paladin and priest class was introduced in the 2010 World of Warcraft: Cataclysm expansion pack to add additional gameplay flexibility. In 2014, male Tauren were given a character model redesign in World of Warcraft to add facial expressions and make them more realistic, while female Tauren followed months later. While Tauren have long been limited to more warrior-like classes, the 2022 Dragonflight expansion pack allowed players to become a Tauren rogue, something long thought to be a joke by fans of the series due to their large size, hooves, and general lack of stealth.

== Reception ==
William Sins Bainbridge, writing in the book The Warcraft Civilization, compared the Tauren to minotaurs from Greek mythology, calling them evidence of how eclectic World of Warcraft is in its design. It notes that while the Tauren are known as placid and reliable in the series' gameplay, they still faced racial prejudice in the games' fictional world. Digital Culture, Play, and Identity remarked that female Tauren are a major exception to the "model-like females" that World of Warcraft players were used to in the game's world. It described them as being the most alienated from the traditional notion of femininity, it cites their "almost-plump" body, hooves, and cow-like noses as features that would typically be perceived as "ugly", giving players more variation in looks.

The Tauren's use of Native American imagery was criticized as insulting. Colin Campbell of Polygon described it as "appropriated" and a poor, exaggerated depiction. Digital Culture states that the depiction of Horde culture, including the Tauren, was "not nuanced", describing them as shallow cultural stereotypes and akin to colonial representations of primitive peoples. The book stated that the Tauren walked the line between "quiet and peaceful" and "implacable" foes who "smash their enemies under hoof", as opposed to the more pseudo-Western Alliance. Philip Michael Alexander wrote in Identity and Collaboration in World of Warcraft that the Tauren seemed like a good idea for a fictional race until he saw how they "lampooned" Plains Indian culture, calling it "shockingly similar" to real life. Noting that they were even displaced from their homeland, he described their characterization as "almost too lazy" and said that it made him change his character's race away from Tauren.
