= Warcraft Rumble =

2023 video game

- Developer: Blizzard Entertainment
- Publisher: Blizzard Entertainment
- Directors: Tom Chilton, Vik Saraf
- Producer: Jackie Bacal Head
- Artist: Jeremy Collins
- Composer: Jake Lefkowitz
- Series: Warcraft
- Engine: Unity
- Platforms: Android; iOS; Windows
- Release: November 3, 2023
- Genres: Tower defense, real-time strategy
- Modes: Single-player, multiplayer

Warcraft Rumble is a 2023 free-to-play mobile tower defense and action strategy video game developed and published by Blizzard Entertainment. Warcraft Rumble is set within the Warcraft universe. It was released for iOS and Android on November 3, 2023 and for Windows on December 10, 2024.

== Gameplay ==
Warcraft Rumble is a mobile tower defense and action strategy set in the Warcraft universe. Along with co-op and multiplayer options, there is a single-player campaign available. The idea of the game is to use gold that has been gained passively to create troops who battle automatically and advance. These troops can take objectives to increase their gold supply and engage in combat with hostile forces. Once the forces have caught up to and vanquished the enemy leader, the game is over.

Within the world of the Warcraft series, troops are separated into many categories known as families. Every family consists of stronger groups with various leaders who guide the troops.

== Development ==
Warcraft Rumble is a free-to-play, tower defense and action strategy video game by Blizzard Entertainment. In mid-2021, the game entered into alpha stage. Warcraft Rumble was originally announced by Blizzard Entertainment on May 3, 2022, under the title Warcraft Arclight Rumble. During its development, the title underwent a name change, simplifying to Warcraft Rumble. The game launched worldwide on November 3, 2023, coinciding with BlizzCon 2023.

The creators of Warcraft Rumble drew inspiration from tower defense video games. The necessity to make the characters stand out on small phone displays led to the decision to include them in the game's unit roster. Every model required a distinct silhouette in addition to a color scheme that was coded. Blizzard Entertainment desired representation from all around the Warcraft universe, the developers carefully considered factions other than the Alliance and Horde.

On July 2, 2025, Blizzard announced that they had ceased the development of new content for Warcraft Rumble and laid off the majority of the game development team.
