= Jaina Proudmoore =

Character in Warcraft

- Warcraft character
- Jaina Proudmoore in Heroes of the Storm
- First appearance: Warcraft III: Reign of Chaos
- Created by: Blizzard Entertainment
- Voiced by: Carrie Gordon Lowrey (WC3, WC3:R and WoW Classic); Laura Bailey (WoW: WotLK onwards)

In-universe information
- Race: Human
- Gender: Female
- Relatives: Arthas Menethil (former lover)

Jaina Proudmoore is a fictional character who appears in the Warcraft series of video games by Blizzard Entertainment. Within the games, she is one of the most powerful sorceresses alive. She is currently Lord Admiral, ruler of the island nation of Kul Tiras. Jaina was formerly the leader of the Kirin Tor, a faction of mages who have ruled over the once great city of Dalaran. She swore to defeat the Burning Legion and its sinister agents any way she could and helped defeat and banish the demons. Once a diplomat, she advocated for peace between the Alliance and the Horde, and she later joined the Alliance after the destruction of her city of Theramore at the hands of the Horde. The character has become one of the most iconic and noted characters in Warcraft lore, and has received positive critical reception from gamers. Jaina's other appearances include the collectible card game Hearthstone and the crossover multiplayer online battle arena video game Heroes of the Storm. Jaina was voiced by Carrie Gordon Lowrey in Warcraft III: Reign of Chaos and World of Warcraft, and is currently voiced by Laura Bailey in the subsequent World of Warcraft expansions, Hearthstone, and Heroes of the Storm.

== Development ==
Jaina first appeared in Warcraft III: Reign of Chaos. As per the game's campaign designer David Fried, in an early draft she was supposed to die and be raised as a banshee, but this plot element was scrapped and moved over to the story of Sylvanas Windrunner. In an interview with Warcraft developer Dave Kosak over World of Warcraft: Mists of Pandaria, he revealed that much of the game's scenarios stem from the developers' desire to allow Jaina's character to be further developed and allow her to further participate in the story, similar to how "the way you might move some pawns aside on a chessboard so that the queen can come out and start doing some damage." Heroes of the Storm designer Alan Dibiri said that for Jaina's appearance within the game, she was "designed to be a straight-up spellcaster", and that "her abilities are cold-based, and she can cast area of effect damage and slow enemies with chill.”

Heroes of the Storm designer Kent-Erick said that in designing the character, "we had a lot of fun working on Jaina's talents. We actually went through a couple of iterations, trying to make sure she had multiple fun builds [...] You can have Jaina throwing out Frostbolts every second if you play your cards right!" In an interview with World of Warcraft Trading Card Game developer Cryptozoic, he stated that "MMO fans are immediately drawn to iconic figures like Tirion Fordring, Jaina Proudmoore, and Sylvanas Windrunner", which contributes to the popularity of the game.

== Appearances ==
Jaina Proudmoore is the leader of Dalaran and former leader of the port city of Theramore. Born into nobility, Jaina is the daughter of Grand Admiral Daelin Proudmoore, lord of the island nation of Kul Tiras.

After displaying magical talent at a young age, it was arranged for Jaina to be sent to Dalaran to begin an apprenticeship with the Kirin Tor (the faction of mages who rule Dalaran). After persistent badgering, Jaina was accepted as the apprentice of the Kirin Tor's leader Archmage Antonidas, becoming one of the few female wizards at the time.

During her early adulthood, Jaina struggled to prevent the spreading of a mysterious plague of undeath that would initiate the Third War and send her longtime friend and romantic interest, Prince Arthas Menethil, down a path of unmitigated darkness.

After the plague of Lordaeron and destruction of Dalaran during the events of Warcraft III: Reign of Chaos, Jaina rallied as many survivors she could and led them west across the great sea, eventually arriving on Kalimdor and founding the city of Theramore. As the war escalated, Jaina gained the trust of Thrall, the warchief of the reformed Horde, and became a key player in uniting the races of Azeroth to work together and stop the Burning Legion.

Once an advocate for diplomacy and peace between the Horde and Alliance, Jaina has more recently declared war on the Horde after the destruction of Theramore at the hands of warchief Garrosh Hellscream. Following Theramore's destruction, the Kirin Tor approached Jaina to become their new leader after the death of their former leader Rhonin at the hands of the Horde during Theramore's destruction. Accepting the role, Jaina pledged to maintain the rebuilt Dalaran's position of neutrality between the Horde and Alliance despite the events of Theramore. However, after it was discovered that blood elf mages had used Dalaran's resources to aid the Horde in stealing an artifact from the night elf capital of Darnassus, Jaina banished all blood elves from Dalaran, taking prisoners where possible but swiftly executing any who resisted. Jaina has since pledged Dalaran and the might of the Kirin Tor to King Varian Wrynn and the Alliance.

Jaina appears as a playable character in the crossover game Heroes of the Storm. In the game, she is a powerful ranged attack mage, with both direct and area of effect attacks that deal a chill effect to enemies. Her "heroic abilities" allows players to summon a water elemental or cast a freezing ring that deals damage and roots opponents.

Jaina also appears in the Warcraft spinoff card game Hearthstone, where she is a playable hero and represents the Mage class. As such, she wields powerful magical abilities, and can make use of effects such as freezing and boosts to spell power. She also makes an appearance in the World of Warcraft Trading Card Game as a collectible card.

== Reception ==
The character has received mostly positive reviews. Engadget's Anne Stickney, while criticising the "lamentable state" of female characters in Warcraft, singled out Jaina as a "shining exception", writing "Jaina stands on her own two feet, and her existence isn't tied to anyone in particular. Arthas is dead, and while Wrath of the Lich King had her crying every other moment, that was understandable. Jaina as a character was peeling away from how Arthas had defined her and coming into her own." Reviewing Jaina Proudmoore: Tides of War, Stickney also wrote that "Christie Golden knows her Warcraft and knows it well. With a host of beloved Warcraft novels under her belt, she continues to shine with her latest foray into the world of Azeroth. Golden is also no stranger to Jaina Proudmoore; her novel Arthas: Rise of the Lich King fleshed out more of Jaina's tumultuous past as well as the birth and death of her relationship with Arthas, even as Golden explored the details of Arthas' fall. That said, the character of Jaina has never been written better—Golden has an amazing grasp on the woman and what exactly is going on inside her head." Stickney further wrote that "Jaina Proudmoore [is] a force to be reckoned with. It's not the uncanny magic prowess, it's not that she is now leader of the Kirin Tor. It's that even when she was driven over that brink of loss, even when every ounce of support she had was stripped from her, she still retained her wisdom." Jaina also featured in a letter addressed to the character.

Mike Fahey of Kotaku referred to Jaina as "Warcraft's mightiest sorceress", and that "she's [Jaina] been kicking arse in Warcraft since back before there was a world of it, and she was romantically involved with the Lich King prior to the Lich King bits. Blizzard's put Jaina through hell, so it's about time she got a little payback [in Heroes of the Storm]." Kotaku's Gergo Vas also listed her as "a great character everyone's familiar with." John Bedford of Eurogamer labelled her as "Warcraft's iconic mage", an opinion agreed upon by Julian Aidan of Hardcore Gamer, who found Jaina to be "one of the most iconic characters in WarCraft lore." Adanai.com listed Jaina among "unconventional video game heroes" list, stating: "The most powerful magician in the Warcraft universe, Jaina Proudmoore holds her own in a fight, which she demonstrates many times in-game. But she's not a fighter at heart; she's a scholar and a diplomat who always tries to find a peaceful solution. Later games have made questionable choices regarding her character, but in her Warcraft III incarnation, she was someone any young girl could look up to: brilliant, brave, tolerant, and kind." In 2015, Vietnamese newspaper Thanh Niên ranked the "strong and smart" Jaina as the 25th sexiest female video game character. She is also a popular subject to cosplay as.
