= Arthas Menethil =

Arthas Menethil Lich King
- Warcraft character
- Arthas Menethil in Heroes of the Storm
- First appearance: A Trial of Will, Chapter 5 of Warcraft: Of Blood and Honor
- First game: Warcraft III: Reign of Chaos
- Created by: Blizzard Entertainment
- Voiced by: Justin Gross (WC3 and WC3:FT); Patrick Seitz (WoW onwards); Michael McConnohie (WoW onwards, as Lich King)

In-universe information
- Race: Undead human
- Gender: Male

Arthas Menethil is a fictional character who appears in the Warcraft series of video games and novels by Blizzard Entertainment. He was once a paladin of the Silver Hand and the crown prince of Lordaeron, but he turned to evil during a fight to save his people. He later became the Lich King, one of the most prominent antagonists in Warcraft lore. The critical reception of the character has been mostly positive.

In Warcraft III, Arthas is voiced by Justin Gross. In subsequent appearances, he is voiced by Patrick Seitz (as Arthas) and Michael McConnohie (as the Lich King).

== Development ==
According to Warcraft game designers Scott Mercer and Greg Street, "early on in the development of Warcraft III, we knew the game would be about heroes leading their armies into battle. We initially created Arthas as one of those leaders, so we knew from the beginning he would be central to the storyline", and that he "is the bridge connecting the human and the undead campaigns."

Regarding the development of World of Warcraft: Wrath of the Lich King, Mercer stated that "when development began on Wrath of the Lich King, we knew we wanted the players to have a more personal connection with the Lich King ... so we started designing quests and instances in which we could show the Lich King to the players." Developers also designed the game so that "players can see the wrecks of the Alliance ships that Arthas set ablaze ... they can also find the altar upon which Arthas first discovered Frostmourne ... We deliberately built these aspects into Wrath of the Lich King to help remind players who Arthas is and where he came from, which we hope makes his character that much more vivid in players' minds."

== Appearances ==
=== Warcraft franchise ===
Arthas Menethil was the prince of Lordaeron and the only son of Terenas Menethil II. Arthas was an idealistic, yet somewhat rash, young man who dreamed of one day succeeding his father as king of Lordaeron. Arthas became an apprentice paladin at nineteen and served as a favorite pupil of Uther the Lightbringer. Though Arthas loved the kindly Uther like an uncle, he longed to take command of his own destiny and become a hero like the brave veterans who fought the orcs during the Second War. Despite the heartache he felt when his brief affair with the sorceress Jaina Proudmoore came to an end, Arthas remained remarkably committed to his roles as both the prince of Lordaeron and as a holy paladin. He had a deep reverence for the Light and wanted nothing more than to safeguard his beloved people from harm.

Arthas was inducted into Knights of the Silver Hand at the age of 19. The ceremony was held in the Cathedral of Light in Stormwind City, and was attended by prominent figures such as Genn Greymane, Thoras Trollbane, Daelin Proudmoore, and Jaina Proudmoore, whom Arthas had not seen since childhood. Archbishop Alonsus Faol led the initiation process, which included four of the five original paladins: Uther, Tirion Fordring, Saidan Dathrohan, and Gavinrad the Dire. Arthas was presented with the holy warhammer called Light's Vengeance by Gavinrad, and had the ceremonial silver plates placed upon his shoulders by Uther. While in Stormwind, Arthas visited the newly crowned king, Varian Wrynn, and sparred with him while recounting old memories. He also met the recently born prince, Anduin Wrynn, who gripped his finger.

When Arthas took up the fight against the Scourge, he became increasingly frustrated and stymied by the seemingly unstoppable enemy. Arthas took increasingly extreme steps to conquer them, and his comrades warned him that he was losing his hold on his humanity. A highly debated moment in Warcraft lore revolves around Arthas's decision to purge Stratholme, a city under the influence of the Scourge with its residents about to transform. Uther and Jaina disagreed with Arthas, resulting in their choice to part ways with him. Arthas's fear and resolve proved to be his ultimate undoing. He tracked the plague's source to Northrend, intending to end its threat forever. Instead, the prince eventually fell prey to the Lich King's (Ner'zhul's) tremendous power when he took up the cursed runeblade ("mourneblade"), Frostmourne, believing that it would save his people. Though the sword did grant him unfathomable power, it also stole his soul and transformed him into the greatest of the Lich King's death knights. With his soul cast aside and his sanity shattered, Arthas led the Scourge against his own kingdom. He murdered his father, King Terenas, and crushed the realms of Lordaeron, Quel'Thalas and Dalaran under the Lich King's iron heel.

When the Lich King was threatened by the forces of Illidan Stormrage, Arthas traveled to the Frozen Throne of Northrend. He broke the ice surrounding his master so he could don the Lich King's Helm of Domination and merge with him. After taking control of the Scourge as the new Lich King, Arthas challenged the Alliance and the Horde by initiating attacks on their cities. They responded by sending forces to Northrend to wage war against him.

In World of Warcraft, Arthas is a raid boss and the primary antagonist of the Wrath of the Lich King expansion. He was mortally wounded after a band of adventurers led by Tirion Fordring stormed his fortress, Icecrown Citadel, and defeated him in battle. He was succeeded as the Lich King by Bolvar Fordragon. In World of Warcraft: Shadowlands, it is revealed that upon his death Arthas' soul was cast into The Maw, a realm of the Shadowlands - Warcraft universe's afterlife - by the spirit of his former mentor Uther. The Jailer, the lord of the Shadowlands, used his soul in order to forge a new mourneblade named "Kingsmourne", which was later used by the brainwashed Anduin. After Anduin was freed from the Jailer's control, Arthas' soul was freed from its bindings, allowing it to peacefully fade away.

=== Hearthstone ===
In the online digital collectible card video game Hearthstone, Arthas as The Lich King was added as a legendary neutral minion card in the 2017 Knights of the Frozen Throne expansion. Lich King Arthas is the default starting hero for the Death Knight class, which was introduced in the 2022 March of the Lich King expansion. He also appears in his original human form as an alternate hero for the Paladin class, which can be achieved as a visual alteration for the default paladin hero by defeating the Lich King in the final Knights of the Frozen Throne single-player mission with all nine classes. Lich King Arthas also makes appearances in Hearthstone's other game modes, most notably within the Battlegrounds and Mercenaries game modes.

=== Heroes of the Storm ===
Arthas appears as a playable character in the crossover game Heroes of the Storm. In the game, Arthas is a warrior hero who performs a tanking role on the battlefield. His aim is to attract the attention of enemy players, as he can withstand a large amount of incoming damage thanks to his necromantic self-healing powers, meanwhile disrupting the enemy team with crowd control abilities. Arthas is proficient against melee physical attackers, slowing their move and attack speed. His playstyle is somewhat limited and predictable due to his lack of mobility, yet he is extremely strong in almost any scenario involving teamwork. One of the two heroic abilities allows him to summon Sindragosa, a mighty frost wyrm, that appears and flies over a portion of the battlefield, slowing and disabling enemies with her frost breath. Arthas Menethil is one of the six Blizzard characters who appear in the Heroes of the Storm cinematic trailer.

=== Other appearances ===
In Blizzard's 2023 first-person shooter Overwatch 2, the character Reinhardt has a Lich King skin, styled after Arthas' look. Arthas appears in the non-canon children's book Snow Fight: A Warcraft Tale by Chris Metzen and Wei Wang. In Guitar Hero: Warriors of Rock, Prince Arthas Menethil is an unlockable character after collecting 1600 stars in Quickplay+. Arthas featured in an episode of the animated web series Death Battle where he battled Sauron from the Lord of the Rings franchise. While not a direct appearance, Arthas was referenced in the game AdventureQuest through an enemy named Lord Arrgthas.

== Reception ==
The character has received mostly positive reception, and is often included on lists involving the most popular Warcraft characters and video game characters as a whole. Empire listed Arthas at No. 25 on their list of "the 50 greatest video game characters", writing "Of all the characters in Warcraft lore, Arthas Menethil is the most tragic." He was also included on "The 10 best video-game characters" list by The Guardian, which stated that "initially the valiant model of a medieval knight, everything changes when Arthas picks up a cursed sword and begins to perpetrate a steadily more sinister series of atrocities (think dead peasants), culminating in killing his own father. The character really came into his own in the mighty World of Warcraft, over which his twisted spirit presided for five years."

Matthew Rossi of Engadget listed the Lich King at No. 4 on his list of the "Top 10 magnificent bastards of Warcraft", since he "successfully molded Arthas into the perfect death knight ... Arthas went from an earnest young prince and paladin trying desperately to save his people to a cackling villain who betrayed them, and it was more Arthas' doing than the Lich King's that Illidan was defeated." He also wrote that "Arthas was useful because he started as a basically good, if somewhat arrogant, young paladin who slowly grew obsessed over time as he witnessed the actions of the Scourge, making mistakes ... and then justifying each mistake as a necessity. By the time he took up Frostmourne and lost his soul, he'd long since eroded it away with expedient choices that were, in fact, monstrous ... Arthas as a death knight and later Arthas as the Lich King showed this tendency to want to justify or prove his actions were the right ones, that anyone would have done what he did." Rossi stated that the lesson of Arthas was "Ultimately, that power corrupts. Power corrupted him, and it will corrupt you, too. That it is inescapable [...] that becoming the Lich King was inevitable, that all kings and princes and people of power ultimately end up slaves to themselves."

Arthas was listed on Complex's list of "25 dead video game characters we wish were still here", noting that "in the same way that Boromir was corrupted in Lord of the Rings, Arthas represents the folly of man, and how easily power can be corrupted. Because of this, we almost want him to survive just to serve as an example that redemption is possible in anyone. If the Lich King had been able to turn around his ways, then there would've been hope for us all." IGN found Arthas to be one of "gaming's most notorious anti-heroes", since "Arthas Menethil began as something of a Disney prince, upholding the Light wherever he saw the need. But with the arrival of the plague of undeath, the Light in Arthas began to waver ... but as is often the case, he wasn't a simple prince-turned-insane-villain. The newly formed Lich King may have been evil, but he was keeping the undead Scourge in check, holding back the flood of the decrepit and the mindless."

Arthas also features in Warcraft-related merchandise, such as Halloween costumes.
