= Warcraft III: Reforged =

2020 video game

- Developers: Blizzard Entertainment; Lemon Sky Studios
- Publisher: Blizzard Entertainment
- Producer: Pete Stillwell
- Designer: Matt Morris
- Series: Warcraft
- Platforms: Microsoft Windows macOS
- Release: January 28, 2020
- Genre: Real-time strategy
- Modes: Single-player, multiplayer

Warcraft III: Reforged is a remastered edition of the 2002 real-time strategy video game Warcraft III: Reign of Chaos and its expansion The Frozen Throne. Released on January 28, 2020, it features updated graphics, new campaign gameplay settings as well as modern online Battle.net features. The game received mixed reviews from critics and an overwhelmingly negative reception from players due to its changes from the original, the lack of many announced features, and technical issues.

== Gameplay ==
Reforged retains the gameplay of the original, but its development has led to further balance changes to the game's multiplayer. Players from the original client are able to access and play with Reforged players by upgrading to the new client (after they have purchased the product). There is a Classic Graphics setting available without purchase for those owning a classic license. Similar to StarCraft: Remastered, it uses the textures of the original release. Users can unlock profile icons based on per-race ratings.

The campaign's missions were visually updated to reflect World of Warcraft, however, the map of Azeroth and heroes' appearances were still kept closer to the original Warcraft III concepts than to those appearing in WoW. Moreover, there are certain features missing from Reforged, such as the competitive ladder, classic animated backgrounds and replay saving option. Some of them are expected to be added in upcoming patches. However, some have not been included, like the "Clans" social system, which has not been mentioned by Blizzard.

The campaign now has three difficulty settings, one of them is the "story mode" aimed at newcomers.

== Synopsis ==
Warcraft III: Reforged has the same plot as the original game, but possesses minor visual and stylistic changes.

== Development ==
Blizzard intended, along with a desire from the player base, to develop StarCraft: Remastered as a generally pure remake. In contrast, Warcraft III: Reforged was intended to be less pure. Producer Pete Stillwell said that "When we went to Korea [for StarCraft: Remastered] and talked with pros and people still playing in game rooms, the overwhelming feedback was 'Please don't change the game ... Make it pretty, give us a modern matchmaker and then quietly step away, Blizzard.' Getting those marching orders made the endeavor not just easier but more focused. But with Warcraft 3: Reforged, we've talked with the communities in Europe and in China [who say], 'Hey, we don't think this game is done.' The goal is not just to give Warcraft III a new coat of paint, but 'do more with it.'" Lemon Sky Studios partnered with Blizzard to provide most of the remastered 3D art assets.

According to Jason Schreier of Bloomberg News, the remaster had problems from the start in 2017. While the team behind the remaster had a grand scope for what they wanted to bring, the Activision management did not see much value in the remaster over new games, and pressure was placed on Blizzard to focus on these newer games. The Classic Games team at Blizzard, behind the development of the remaster, was never given the necessary budget to complete their scope. Further, with the February 2019 layoffs across Activision Blizzard, many of the staff on the Classic Games team were affected, and the change of management within the team greatly impacted the production rates. There also were issues with the management style of Rob Bridenbecker, the manager of the Classic Games group, that further impacted how the team functioned.

Other games at development within Blizzard were canceled in favor of titles like Overwatch, but because they had already started taking pre-orders for the remaster, the project could not be easily canceled. Instead, a decision was made by management to release the game in an early state to avoid having to refund the pre-orders, even though the Classic Games team realized the game was not ready in that state. By the end of 2019, the Classic Games team had called on other Blizzard teams to help prepare the game to a reasonable state for launch in January 2020. About eight months following release, the Classic Games team was disbanded, leaving the promised updates the responsibility of other teams within Blizzard.

=== Story ===
Originally, Blizzard author Christie Golden was commissioned to work on an altered campaign, while the original campaign would be partially retconned to bring it in line with the story of World of Warcraft and the revisions to the story made by the World of Warcraft: Chronicle lore series. Some original voice actors would be replaced by those currently voicing their characters. However, due to fanbase reaction, this was scrapped. Though only the original intro cinematic was recreated, the others are remastered.

=== Custom content ===
The internal scripting language of Warcraft III, JASS, is joined by Lua, commonly used in scripting and custom content for other games, and for Blizzard's World of Warcraft. Lua is intended to make custom content creation easier and to expand it. Blizzard has said they intend to make the editor more powerful. Other changes such as increased custom camera views and individual unit traits are introduced.

The Acceptable User Policy claims all intellectual property rights to custom games created on Reforged to Blizzard Entertainment, which has been met with criticism.

== Release ==
At BlizzCon 2018 on November 2, 2018, Blizzard Entertainment announced Warcraft III: Reforged featuring remodeled characters and graphics with a prospective release in 2019. After Reforged's reveal, the game's first balance changes in years were announced. During Blizzcon 2019, the beta for the game began.

Reforged was originally slated to be released in 2019, however, on December 17, 2019, Blizzard announced that the release would be delayed until January 28, 2020, stating that "as we started approaching the finish line, we felt we'd need a little extra development time for finishing touches".

Due to the large amount of negative sentiment towards the remaster, Blizzard released a "2.0" update in 2024. Among the features added was the ability to switch between Reforged and "Classic HD" graphics. The latter uses the character models of the original release without the alterations made by Reforged. Meanwhile, the classic installer is now bundled with Reforged, and supports all of the original mods and custom maps. Since the release, most of the community multiplayer has moved to the W3Champions platform, in response to Reforged's handling of competitive ladders.

On October 3, 2024, Blizzard disabled macOS support for Warcraft III: Reforged by remotely deleting the game's executable from players' Mac computers. Subsequent statements by Blizzard representatives referenced an unspecified "issue" with the game on the Mac. macOS support was restored in the 2.0 patch released on November 13.

== Reception ==
Reception

Aggregate score
Aggregator	Score
Metacritic	59/100

Review scores
Publication	Score
Game Informer	6/10
GameStar	66/100
IGN	7/10
PC Gamer (US)	59/100

Warcraft III: Reforged received "mixed or average" reviews according to Metacritic. PC Gamer's Fraser Brown concluded that Reforged was still an exceptional game at its core but was plagued by bugs, a lack of features and poor design choices such as the "massive" user interface. German magazine GameStar opined that the remaster was still a good game in regards to its single-player, despite it not including the promised changes and additions, but its multiplayer features were now either worse than before or non-existent.

Player response was overwhelmingly negative. On release, the game was review-bombed by users on Metacritic, temporarily becoming the lowest score ever for a Blizzard game, before being surpassed by 2022's Diablo Immortal. Similarly, the game would temporarily become the lowest-ranked game on the site by user score, before being surpassed by Madden NFL 21. Many criticized the remaster for its absence of features promised by Blizzard at launch, removal of previously existing features, technical issues, changes to the original game's user interface among other gameplay features, and graphical changes which some felt had either not been improved enough or looked worse. Blizzard was also criticized for their decision that, due to it sharing Reforged's client, all existing copies of Warcraft III: Reign of Chaos were required to update to a newer version, which meant that many of the gameplay changes to Reforged were now mandatory in the original. Additionally, there were complaints towards Blizzard's announcement that they would claim ownership over all user-created content in Reforged.

On February 3, 2020, Polygon reported that Blizzard is offering full refunds for all players on request regardless of playtime. The next day, Blizzard announced that some technical issues and missing features will be addressed with future patches but defended their decision not to include the cutscenes showcased at BlizzCon 2018 with their wish to preserve the spirit of the original.

== See also ==
- List of video games notable for negative reception
