= Warcraft III: Reign of Chaos =

2002 video game

- Warcraft III box art depicting an orc
- Developer: Blizzard Entertainment
- Publisher: Blizzard Entertainment (Note: Japanese version published/distributed by Capcom.)
- Director: Frank Pearce Jr.
- Producer: Chris Sigaty
- Designer: Rob Pardo
- Artist: Samwise Didier
- Writer: Chris Metzen
- Composers: Tracy W. Bush; Derek Duke; Glenn Stafford
- Series: Warcraft
- Platforms: Windows, Classic Mac OS, Mac OS X
- Release: NA/AU: July 3, 2002; EU: July 5, 2002
- Genre: Real-time strategy
- Modes: Single-player, multiplayer

Warcraft III: Reign of Chaos is a high fantasy real-time strategy computer video game developed and published by Blizzard Entertainment released in July 2002. It is the second sequel to Warcraft: Orcs & Humans, after Warcraft II: Tides of Darkness, the third game set in the Warcraft fictional universe, and the first to be rendered in three dimensions. An expansion pack, The Frozen Throne, was released in July 2003. Warcraft III is set several years after the events of Warcraft II, and tells the story of the Burning Legion's attempt to conquer the fictional world of Azeroth with the help of an army of the Undead known as the Scourge, led by the fallen paladin Arthas Menethil. It chronicles the combined efforts of the Human Alliance, Orcish Horde, and Night Elves to stop them before they can corrupt the World Tree.

In the game, as in many real-time strategy (RTS) games, players collect resources, train individual units and heroes, and build bases in order to achieve various goals (in single-player mode), or to defeat the enemy player. Four playable factions can be chosen from: Humans, Orcs, (both of which appeared in the previous games) and two new factions: the Night Elves and the Undead. Warcraft III's single-player campaign is laid out similarly to that of StarCraft, and is told through the races in a progressive manner. Players can also play matches against the computer, or against others—using local area networking (LAN) or Blizzard's Battle.net gaming platform.

After Warcraft II: Beyond the Dark Portal, the last in the Warcraft saga, was released in 1996, Blizzard began development of a point-and-click adventure game called Warcraft Adventures: Lord of the Clans, which was supposed to continue the story. Lord of the Clans was canceled in favor of Warcraft III in 1998, which was presented to the public at the European Computer Trade Show in September 1999. The game's design and gameplay was significantly altered during development, with the final game sharing little similarities with the originally presented version (see similarities to StarCraft).

The game received acclaim from critics, who praised the game's presentation and multiplayer features. It is considered an influential example of RTS video games and one of the greatest video games ever made. Warcraft III was a commercial success, shipping 4.4 million copies to retail stores, selling over a million within a month. Video game modifications created with the World Editor, such as Defense of the Ancients, led to lasting changes and inspired many future games. In 2020, Blizzard released a remastered version of both Warcraft III and its expansion, The Frozen Throne, called Warcraft III: Reforged.

== Gameplay ==
Warcraft III takes place on a map of varying size, such as large plains and fields, with terrain features like rivers, mountains, seas, or cliffs. The map is initially hidden from view and only becomes visible through exploration. Areas no longer in sight range of an allied unit or building are covered with the fog of war, meaning that while the terrain remains visible, player caused changes such as enemy troop movements and building construction are not. During a game, players must establish settlements to gain resources, defend against others, and train units from buildings to explore the map and fight computer controlled foes. There are three main resources that are managed in Warcraft III: gold, lumber, and food. The first two are required to construct units and buildings, while food restricts the maximum number of units that can be possessed at the same time. Additionally, a new "upkeep" system means that producing units over certain amounts will decrease the amount of gold one can earn, compelling players to focus on playing with a limited number of units to avoid penalties.

A screenshot of the single-player campaign, showing the orc hero Thrall approaching a quest marker and the full game interface

The game displays units and buildings as well as the environment from a classical top-down perspective with a slight angle that can only be zoomed and rotated slightly. The game features a fixed interface in the bottom of the screen that displays a mini-map, the information about the currently selected unit or group of units and possible actions for this unit or building. If multiple units are selected, the game automatically groups them by type, allowing all units of the same type to be given special commands (like using their skills). A small top bar displays the current time of day as well as the currently owned resources and the current upkeep level. The top left corner displays a portrait of the player's hero(es) for quick access. If worker units have no jobs to do, their icons are displayed in the bottom left corner for easy assignment.

Warcraft III features four playable factions: The Alliance — a coalition of humans, dwarves, and high elves — and the Horde — composed of orcs, trolls, and minotaur-inspired tauren — return from the previous games while the Undead Scourge and the Night Elves were added as two new factions. As in StarCraft, each race has a unique set of units, structures, technologies, and base-building methodology.

The game also introduces creeps, computer controlled units that are hostile to all players. Creeps guard key areas such as gold mines or neutral buildings and, when killed, provide experience points, gold, and special items that can be used by heroes. Warcraft III also introduced a day/night cycle to the series. Besides having advantages or disadvantages for certain races, at night most creeps fall asleep, making nighttime scouting safer; however, the line of sight for most units is also reduced. Additionally, some Night Elf units become invisible at night when not moving. Other minor changes to the gameplay were due to the 3D terrain. For instance, units on a cliff have an attack bonus when attacking units at lower elevations.

In addition, Warcraft III adds powerful new units called heroes. For each enemy unit killed, a hero will gain experience points, which allow the hero to level-up to a maximum level of 10. Progressing up a level increases the hero's attributes and also allows the hero to gain new spell options (bringing role-playing video game elements to the series). Certain hero abilities can boost allied units. All heroes can equip items to increase skills, defense, and other abilities. At level six, the hero can obtain an "ultimate" skill that is more powerful than the three other spells that the hero possesses. Heroes can also utilize the various natural resources found throughout the map, such as controllable non-player characters, and markets in which the hero can purchase usable items. Often, hero units become the deciding factor in determining a winner.

Warcraft III's campaign mode is divided into four campaigns, each featuring a different faction. Each campaign is itself divided into chapters, and there is a set order in which they have to be played as the story follows the events in these campaigns. Additionally, an optional prologue campaign that serves as a tutorial can be played before starting the main campaign. Unlike previous Blizzard titles, such as Warcraft II or StarCraft, there are no mission briefings in which plot exposition occurs and objectives are announced; rather, Warcraft III uses a system of "seamless quests". Some plot development happens in an occasional cinematic, but most occurs in-game with cutscenes. Objectives, known as quests, are revealed during the progress of the map. Main quests are those that must be completed to proceed to the next chapter, but there are also optional side quests that are not initially revealed, but can be discovered and completed while following the main questline, oftentimes granting benefits that help with those main objectives.

Through each race's campaign, the player retains control of one or more heroes who slowly grow in experience as the levels progress, which is carried over to subsequent missions, allowing the hero to become more powerful throughout the course of the campaign.

While different in terms of story-line and precise gameplay, all of the different races' campaigns are structured similarly. Each begins with a level involving simple mechanics to introduce the faction and the basic elements of their hero and units. After one or two such levels, the first "building mission" occurs, requiring them to build and maintain a base while competing with one or more enemy forces. The only campaign that breaks this pattern is the Night Elf campaign, whose first mission involves building a limited base. The last level of each race's campaign is an "epic battle" in which a large number of enemy foes has to be defeated.

The game's multiplayer mode uses the Battle.net network. Players can create free accounts in regional "gateways," which helps reduce lag; these are Azeroth (U.S. East), Lordaeron (U.S. West), Northrend (Europe), and Kalimdor (Asia). Unlike previous Battle.net-enabled games, Warcraft III introduced anonymous matchmaking, automatically pairing players for games based on their skill level and game type preferences, preventing cheating and inflating their records artificially. If players want to play with a friend in ranked matches, Warcraft III offers "Arranged Team Games", where a team joins a lobby, and Battle.net will search for another team; as with anonymous matchmaking, the enemy team is not known beforehand.

While campaign games can have many different objectives, the sole objective in multiplayer games is to destroy all the buildings of the opposition. In default melee matches, players can pick their own heroes, and losing one will not end the game. To make the game proceed more quickly, by default the map is fully revealed but covered in the fog of war. Warcraft III, like Blizzard's previous title StarCraft, allows for single and multiplayer replays to be recorded and viewed, allowing a game to be played at slower and faster speeds and viewed from the perspective of all players.

Players can also host custom games, using maps either created in the World Editor, or the default multiplayer scenarios. The map editor allows a variety of custom maps to be created, such as a number of tower defense and multiplayer online battle arena maps, the most notable of which was Defense of the Ancients. The game also offers friends lists and channels for chatting, where players can create custom channels or join Blizzard-approved ones. Warcraft III also allows players to band together to form "clans", which can participate in tournaments or offer a recreational aspect to Warcraft III. Global scores and standings in matchmaking games are kept on a "ladder".

== Synopsis ==
=== Setting and characters ===
Warcraft III takes place in the fictional world of Azeroth. Several years before the events of the game, a demon army known as the Burning Legion, intent on Azeroth's destruction, corrupted a race called the Orcs, and sent them through a portal to attack Azeroth. These events were previously shown in Orcs & Humans, Tides of Darkness and Beyond the Dark Portal. After many years of fighting, the Orcs were defeated by a coalition of humans, dwarves and elves known as the Alliance; the surviving Orcs were herded into internment camps, where they seemed to lose their lust for battle. With no common enemy, a period of peace followed, but the Alliance began to fracture.

The game follows the story of three different heroes: The young and idealistic human paladin and crown prince of Lordaeron, Arthas Menethil, as he becomes more and more corrupted until he joins the Undead and assists with the summoning of demonic forces to Azeroth; the adventures of Orc warchief Thrall as he brings his people to the continent of Kalimdor to escape human captivity and the impending downfall of Lordaeron; and the events involving Tyrande Whisperwind, the Night Elven leader, who has to deal with both the arrival of humans and orcs in their sacred lands and the invasion by the demon forces.

=== Story ===
The game opens with the Orc leader, Thrall, waking from a nightmare warning him of the return of the Burning Legion. (Note: Thrall: What kind of nightmare was that? / The Prophet (later revealed to be 'Medivh'): It was not a nightmare, young warchief, but a vision. Follow me, and I will reveal what your future holds. - Blizzard Entertainment. Warcraft III: Reign of Chaos (Apple Macintosh). Level/area: Prologue: "Chasing Visions".) After a brief encounter with a being who is known only as "the Prophet", and, fearing that his dream was more of a vision than a nightmare, he leads his forces in an exodus from Lordaeron to the forgotten lands of Kalimdor. (Note: The Prophet: Now, go, young Thrall. Sail west to the lands of Kalimdor. It is there that you will find your destiny. It is there that your people's salvation will be assured. - Blizzard Entertainment. Warcraft III: Reign of Chaos (Apple Macintosh). Level/area: Prologue: "Departures".)

An example of how the game handles plot exposition through cutscenes: Arthas decides to cull the city Stratholme before the Undead can claim the population, to the disgust of his mentor and friend. "The Culling" is a mission favorably noted by critics as the pivotal turning point for the character, as well as for the moral dilemma it posited.

Meanwhile, Arthas defends the village of Strahnbrad from orcs. (Note: Arthas: Look, here's where we stand. Our scouts have confirmed that there is an orc encampment hidden somewhere over the next ridge. / Uther: As I suspected. / Arthas: It gets worse. They're preparing to attack the nearby village of Strahnbrad. As far as we know, the village is completely defenseless. / Uther the Lightbringer: I need to move against the Orcs' base immediately. Can you handle Strahnbrad's defense on your own? / Arthas: Of course, Uther. Don't worry about me.. - Blizzard Entertainment. Warcraft III: Reign of Chaos (Apple Macintosh). Level/area: Human Campaign: "The Defense of Strahnbrad".) He then joins Archmage Jaina Proudmoore, who aids him in investigating a rapidly spreading plague, which kills and turns human victims into the undead. Arthas kills the plague's originator, Kel'Thuzad, and then purges the infected city of Stratholme which leads Jaina to part ways with him in disgust. The Prophet, who failed to convince other human leaders to flee west, begs Jaina to go to Kalimdor. (Note: The Prophet: [...] It falls to you now, young sorceress. You must lead your people to the west to the ancient lands of Kalimdor. Only there can you combat the shadow and save this world from the flame. - Blizzard Entertainment. Warcraft III: Reign of Chaos (Apple Macintosh). Level/area: Human Campaign: "The Culling".) Arthas pursues the dreadlord Mal'Ganis to the icy continent of Northrend, where he helps his old friend Muradin Bronzebeard in finding a powerful sword called Frostmourne. When he is told that his forces have been recalled by the Emissary, he begins losing his sanity and engineers the burning of his own ships to prevent their return. Arthas and Muradin eventually find Frostmourne but learn that the sword is cursed. (Note: Muradin Bronzebeard: Hold, lad. There's an inscription on the dais. It's a warning. It says, "Whomsoever takes up this blade shall wield power eternal. Just as the blade rends flesh, so must power scar the spirit." Oh, I should've known. The blade is cursed! Let's get the hell out of here! / Arthas: I would gladly bear any curse to save my homeland. - Blizzard Entertainment. Warcraft III: Reign of Chaos (Apple Macintosh). Level/area: Human Campaign: "Frostmourne".) Disregarding the warning, Arthas offers his soul to gain the sword which leads to Muradin being knocked out (and presumed dead) by a shard of ice when Frostmourne is released. Arthas slays Mal'Ganis with the blade and returns to Lordaeron where he murders his father, King Terenas.

Now a death knight, Arthas meets with the leader of the dreadlords, Tichondrius, who tasks him with resurrecting Kel'Thuzad. After exhuming his body and killing his former mentor Uther the Lightbringer for his father's urn to transport the remains in, Arthas sets off to Quel'Thalas, kingdom of the high elves. He kills Sylvanas Windrunner, the Ranger General of Silvermoon (only to resurrect her as a banshee), corrupts their sacred Sunwell and revives Kel'Thuzad as a Lich. The Lich informs him of the Burning Legion, a vast demonic army who are coming to consume the world, as well as about his true master, the Lich King, who was created to aid the Legion with his Undead Scourge but in truth wishes for the Legion to be destroyed. Kel'Thuzad opens a dimensional portal and summons the demon Archimonde, who begins the Burning Legion invasion, not before destroying Dalaran. Arthas and Kel'Thuzad are cast aside by Archimonde but Kel'Thuzad reveals to Arthas that the Lich King has already foreseen this and is planning to overthrow the Burning Legion.

Thrall arrives on Kalimdor, meeting Cairne Bloodhoof and the Tauren and clashes with a human expedition on the way to find an Oracle. Meanwhile, the Orcish Warsong Clan is left behind in Ashenvale to build a permanent settlement, but angers the Night Elves and their demigod Cenarius by cutting down the forests for resources. To defeat them, the Warsong leader Grom Hellscream drinks from a fountain contaminated with the blood of the Legion's pit lord commander Mannoroth, successfully killing Cenarius, but binding his clan to the Legion's control. Thrall manages to reach the Oracle, in fact the Prophet, who tells him of Grom's actions. Following the Prophet's directions, Thrall and Jaina join forces and capture Grom, healing him of Mannoroth's corruption. Thrall and Grom begin to hunt Mannoroth and Grom kills him, dying in the process, but in doing so freeing the orcs from the demonic control of Mannoroth.

Tyrande Whisperwind, leader of the Night Elves, is outraged to find the Humans and Orcs violating the forests and blames them for Cenarius' death, so she vows to destroy both. However, she soon discovers that a far greater threat has returned to Kalimdor: the Burning Legion. In order to oppose the Burning Legion, Tyrande reawakens the sleeping Elf Druids, starting with her lover, Malfurion Stormrage, and frees his brother Illidan Stormrage from prison, against Malfurion's wishes. Illidan meets Arthas, who tells him about the powerful "Skull of Gul'dan". Consuming the Skull and becoming a demon-elf hybrid, Illidan uses its power to kill Tichondrius but is banished from the forest by his brother as he is now part demon. Meanwhile, the Prophet summons Thrall, Jaina, Tyrande and Malfurion, and reveals that he used to be Medivh, the Last Guardian and the betrayer from Warcraft: Orcs & Humans, returned to make amends for his past sins. With the Burning Legion marching towards Mount Hyjal in their intent to corrupt the World Tree and thus the whole world, Humans, Orcs, and Night Elves form a reluctant alliance to spring a trap on the Burning Legion. They manage to delay the Legion long enough for many ancestral spirits to gather at the World Tree and destroy Archimonde as he attempts to reach it but in doing so, the Night Elves lose their immortality and their power over nature will gradually wane over time, though they do not mind. Peace once again comes to Kalimdor as the Burning Legion's forces wither away in defeat. Medivh, in a final monologue, then states that he needed to teach the world that guardians are no longer necessary to look after Azeroth and that he is satisfied that his task is now complete. Medivh then disappears, stating that he will now take his place amongst the legends of the past.

== Development ==
Alpha gameplay footage shown at ECTS 1999. The screenshot shows the original, minimal game interface and over-the-shoulder camera perspective. A similar camera angle would be adopted for future games in the franchise, such as World of Warcraft.

After the success of Warcraft II (1995) and Warcraft II: Beyond the Dark Portal (1996), Blizzard originally planned to continue the story with a point-and-click adventure game called Warcraft Adventures: Lord of the Clans. This game was supposed to tell the story of Thrall from being raised in captivity to becoming the leader of his clan. However, in 1998, Blizzard canceled Lord of the Clans for not meeting the company's quality standards. Thrall's story was instead worked into Warcraft III, whose development began in early 1998. The game was announced as a role-playing strategy game (RPS) on September 5, 1999, at a press conference by the game's lead designer Rob Pardo inside the Henley-Suite at the European Computer Trade Show 1999.

According to Pardo, Mike O'Brien, the game's lead programmer, originally planned a strategy game—tentatively titled Warcraft Legends—with few units to command, over-the-shoulder camera and no base building. However, after a year of work this concept did not work out and the existing framework was used to create Warcraft III instead. As a result of these design choices, the first version shown at ECTS 1999 had no notable interface, however it did have portraits for the heroes. In first previews, the game's design and gameplay was therefore compared to games such as Myth and Heroes of Might and Magic. Various articles showed that abilities and items were used via right-click on a unit and an appearing icon collar. In the early stages of development, Blizzard emphasized the role-playing aspect and downplayed base building. Around January 24, 2000 a video from Korea appeared on the Internet; the video showed some aspects of gameplay along with commentary by Pardo. This version already had an interface concept, however most of the interface were placeholders. It had a map, icons for abilities and unit commands and an eye-shaped display for gold. Originally, the game was planned to be released at the end of 2000.

At E3 2000, Blizzard showed a first gameplay trailer that included an interface with some elements of the final design. Then from E3 2000 around May 12, 2000 to ECTS 2000 the game was not changed very much. Gameplay footage from 2001 reveals a polished version of the interface seen in the E3 2000 trailer. Back in November 2000, the game was set to feature five playable races (with the addition of demons) and only a single resource to be mined. In January 2001, Blizzard announced the Night Elves as the last race as well as the conversion of demons into an NPC race. The next major changes came between ECTS 2000 and E3 2001, when a different interface and the Night Elf race was revealed. The versions demonstrated at E3 2001 and ECTS 2001 already contained all the final interfaces and units. In April 2001, Blizzard still experimented with different resources and had versions of the game with gold, lumber, mana stones and upkeep or a race depending resource that represented the population like the required food in newer versions.

In the middle of January 2002, Blizzard shipped out 5000 beta versions of Warcraft III to randomly selected testers in order to help improve it before being released in stores. The beta release had all the game's units and races, however, it was only playable over Battle.net; single player games and LAN play were not playable on the beta version of the game. Warcraft III was first released in the United States and Australia on July 3, 2002 and in Europe on July 5, 2002.

Blizzard continued to maintain WarCraft III, regarding technical issues and compatibility for newer operating systems. In April 2018, Blizzard integrated widescreen support for the first time, more than 15 years after the game's first release.

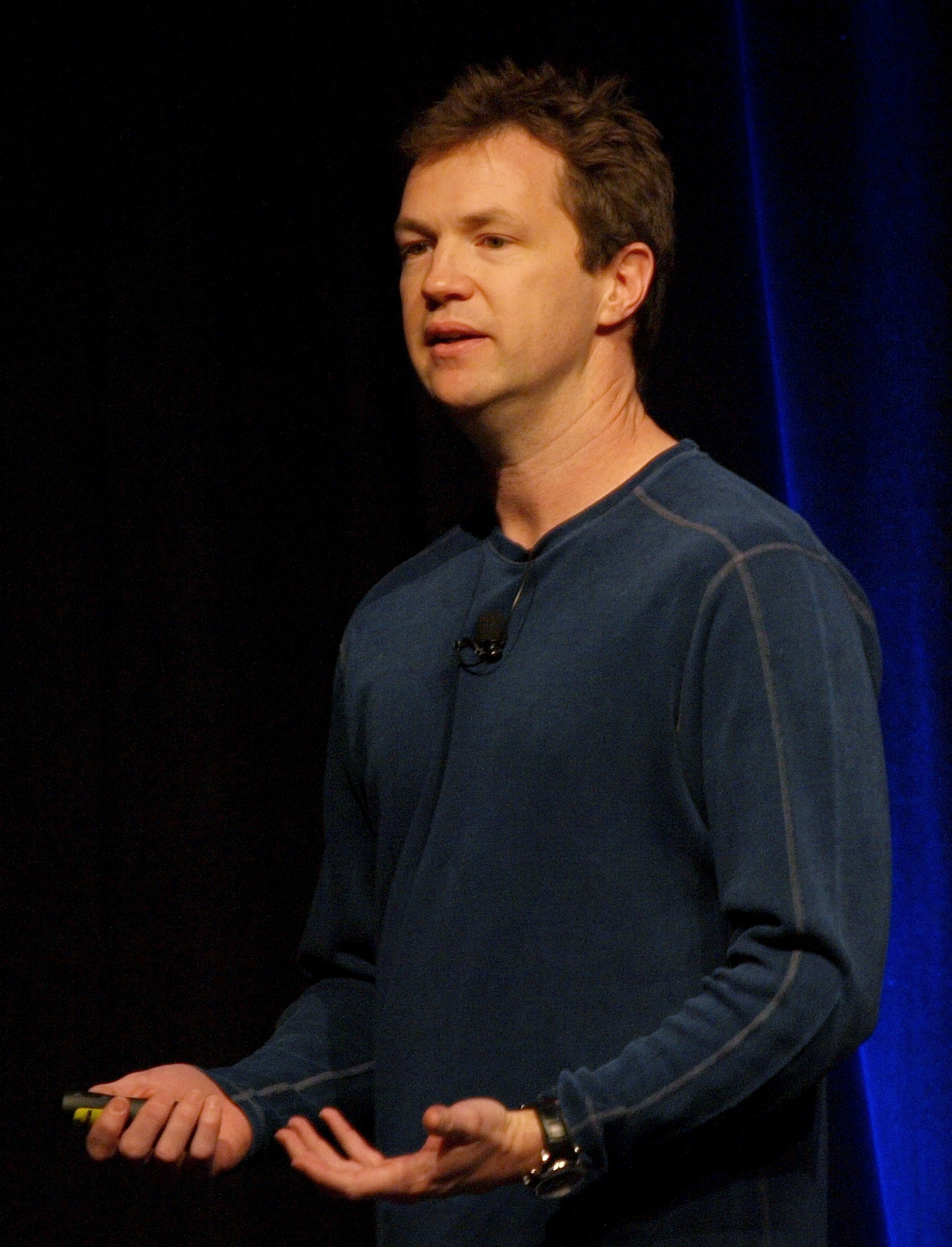
Rob Pardo, lead designer

=== Visual design ===
Warcraft III was the first Blizzard game to be rendered using 3D graphics. Unlike other 3D games of that era, this included all parts of the game, including the menu screens. All characters, including environment units like sheep, have their own 3D portraits when selected that animate when the unit is talking. The game does not use mission briefings like its predecessor but instead tells the story using cutscenes rendered using the game's 3D engine. These cutscenes show the characters using a side-view camera, zooming in to the models. Additionally, each campaign features pre-rendered cinematics that show the outcome of the campaign.

According to Samwise Didier, Blizzard's art director for Warcraft III, the company, when developing the first game of the series, attempted to create a more realistic experience, based on the belief that PC gamers preferred these graphics, leading to Warcraft: Orcs and Humans looking like Medieval Europe. Blizzard allowed classical fantasy properties like Dungeons & Dragons and The Lord of the Rings to influence Warcraft II, adding more fantasy races such as elves, ogres and dwarves, while still keeping a more realistic design. With the establishment of a dependable fan base due to the success of the first two games, the creative team behind Warcraft III decided no longer to follow their artistic vision. As such, the game's visuals mark a notable departure from the previous games in the series, using bolder and more vibrant colors and pursuing a more comic book style. Didier also integrated characters he designed for Dungeons & Dragons into Warcraft III, such as Uther The Lightbringer and Illidan Stormrage. The shift towards a more cartoonish looking world that started with Warcraft III was continued in World of Warcraft which deliberately used less realistic depictions to allow the game to be played on less powerful PCs, thus increasing the potential player-base. The artwork of Warcraft III was hugely influential on a number of other high fantasy real-time strategy games that followed it.

=== Audio ===
Most of the music of Warcraft III was composed by Tracy W. Bush, Derek Duke, Jason Hayes, and Glenn Stafford. The Limited Edition of Reign of Chaos came with much of the orchestral music on a separate CD. Each of the four playable races has different music: monastic music for the humans; ambient and Native American-sounding music for the Night Elves; warlike music for the Orcs; and fast, haunting music for the Undead.

One of the signatures of Blizzard games are the unit quotes: If a single unit is clicked four or more times in a row, the unit's voice samples become increasingly comical. The unit may start getting angry at the player, or make allusions and references to other games, film or jokes.

=== Writing ===
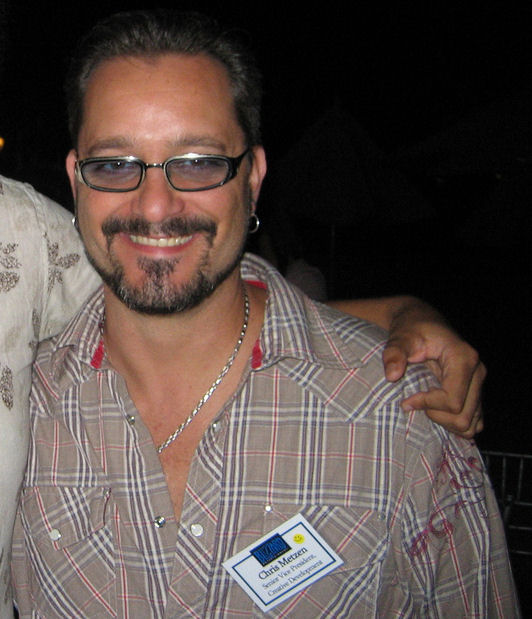
Chris Metzen, writer and creative director

Most of the game's missions and background story was written by Chris Metzen, who also provided the voice for Thrall. Metzen had previously contributed artwork to the first game and became involved in writing stories and missions in Warcraft II. Warcraft III was the first game Metzen served as creative director for, a role he would continue in for all Blizzard games until his retirement in 2016.

=== Modding ===
As did Warcraft II and StarCraft before it, Warcraft III contains a World Editor program that allows players to create their own custom scenarios and maps. The World Editor is powerful enough to allow modders to change almost any aspect of the game and create new maps that feature little of the game's original content. Despite its wealth of features, the World Editor was easy enough for players without any coding experience to design new games. Through Battle.net, players can then share these maps with others, increasing the popularity of custom maps. To facilitate modding, Blizzard and third-party developers released tools for a variety of tasks. Though the editor has received updates through game patches, it is not officially supported as a product. The Lord of the Rings was a particularly popular subject for modded maps, as a trilogy of movies was released around the same time as Warcraft III.

Some custom maps have enjoyed great success, particularly maps based on Aeon of Strife such as Defense of the Ancients (DotA), which became a tournament item at BlizzCon 2005 and other tournaments around the world. DotA is largely attributed with to being the most significant inspiration for the multiplayer online battle arena (MOBA) genre. A strong fanbase has opened up the opportunity for sponsorship and advertising, eventually leading the genre to become a global cultural phenomenon. In 2012, Valve acquired commercial rights to the DOTA name trademark.

=== Expansion ===
Immediately after the release, Blizzard began brainstorming content for an expansion and development began in October 2002. In January 2003, Blizzard announced that the expansion pack was titled The Frozen Throne and continues the story for the Night Elves, Humans and Undead after the events of the main game while providing a completely separate, role-playing focused campaign for the Orcs. Among other changes, The Frozen Throne added a new hero for each faction as well as five neutral heroes that can be hired by all factions. After a public beta test that allowed 20,000 players to test the expansion, it was released worldwide on July 1, 2003.

=== Special editions ===
Upon release, Blizzard made Warcraft III available with four different box arts, one for each faction, in a limited edition. In addition to the regular game, a limited Collector's Edition Warcraft III bundle containing a Warcraft III cinematic DVD, including behind-the-scenes features and the cinematics of all prior Warcraft games; a Collector's Edition Soundtrack; a Collector's Edition instruction manual; The Art of Warcraft book; and lithographic prints was released. Blizzard also released the Warcraft Battle Chest, which contains Reign of Chaos bundled with The Frozen Throne in one box. Another version, the Exclusive Gift Set, came bundled with the cinematic DVD, official BradyGames strategy guide, and Warcraft II: Battle.net Edition.

=== Warcraft III: Reforged ===
At BlizzCon 2018 on November 2, 2018, Blizzard announced a remaster of both Warcraft III and its expansion The Frozen Throne entitled Warcraft III: Reforged featuring remodeled characters and graphics with a prospective release in 2020. It was released on January 28, 2020. Many promised features and updates were not initially included, and several controversial changes were also made to the game even for players who did not purchase Reforged. This led to mixed reception from critics and negative reception from fans, resulting in Blizzard offering refunds. The release of Warcraft III: Reforged resulted in the termination of the original titles Warcraft III and its expansion The Frozen Throne being supported any further.

== Reception ==
=== Critical reception ===
Reception

Aggregate score
| Aggregator | Score |
|---|---|
| Metacritic | 92/100 |

Review scores
| Publication | Score |
|---|---|
| Eurogamer | 9/10 |
| GamePro | 5/5 |
| GameSpot | 9.3/10 |
| GamesRadar+ | 5/5 |
| IGN | 9.3/10 |
| PC Gamer (US) | 94% |

Edit on Wikidata

On review aggregator website Metacritic, Warcraft III received a score of 92/100, indicating "Universal acclaim".

Most critics praised the game's graphics, both the design of the individual units as well as the game world itself, concluding that Blizzard successfully entered the 3-D universe. German magazine PC Games compared the units' appearance to beauty pageant contestants and emphasized many details such as waving capes, knights who balance their weight from one foot to another while standing around and bodies of water colored red when units die in them. The campaign-related cinematics were especially noted, with multiple critics declaring them most impressive feats of video rendering. However, GameSpot noted that the character models were of mediocre quality, especially when viewed up close during in-game cutscenes. Critics also praised the interface as simple yet powerful and making it very easy for players to effectively control their units.

The game's soundtrack was widely lauded as atmospheric and aiding the game's tone, featuring faction-specific music such as heroic hymns (humans) or charming flute melodies (night elves). Reviewers especially noted the individual units' sound effects, the realistic battle noises and mystical magical effect sounds as well the units' humorous comments. The voice acting was praised by many reviewers, with GameSpot finding that it "conveys each personality distinctly and vividly". While IGN also praised most of it, they also noted that some voice acting was mediocre and very few voices actually bad.

While each faction has different units with strengths and weaknesses, the game was found to be balanced enough that no faction is overpowered. GameSpot emphasized positively that the game adds some variety compared to other real-time strategy titles because it forces players to go exploring early on while simultaneously building their base, lest their hero does not gain sufficient experience to win in later battles. The review also noted that each faction has safeguards in place to prevent one player from rushing their opponent too early. GamePro also highlighted that the various mechanics, such as heroes and upkeep, offered more tactical possibilities than ever before.

Many reviewers praised the game's campaign for creating an epic storyline that avoids typical stereotypes and provides a nuanced portrayal of the different factions. Gamecritics.com concluded that Blizzard had finally succeeded in fleshing out the story-line of the first two Warcraft titles, giving each side its own motivations and differences beyond cosmetics. In a retrospect published in March 2018, Waypoint calls the game's story "one of the all-time great single-player campaigns in history", specifically emphasizing the Alliance mission "The Culling" in which the player is placed in a no-win situation and forced to help Arthas slaughter his own people before they turn into aggressive zombies. (Note: According to David K. Fried, who designed the mission "The Culling", Blizzard originally planned to have children villagers as well as adults and had included sound files of villagers panicking and begging for their lives. Both were considered too disturbing and turned off but these resources still exist in the game and can be turned on by manipulating the game files.) Three years prior, in 2015, Vice called "The Culling" as well as Arthas's betrayal at the end of the Alliance campaign and the destruction of Dalaran three of the seven greatest moments in Blizzard Entertainment's history.

The game's multiplayer features were lauded by many critics with GamePro describing them as "addictive" and a fruitful result of long beta testing. Reviewers emphasized that the Battle.net integration made multiplayer games easier than with any other game at that time and lauded the variety of factions as well as the balance between those factions.

=== Sales ===
Warcraft III sold one million units in the first month after release, becoming the fastest-selling PC video game in history at that time and surpassing a record set by Diablo II. The NPD Group declared it the third-best-selling computer game of 2002. In the United States, Warcraft III sold 1 million copies and earned $49.4 million by August 2006, after its release in July 2002, making it the country's seventh best-selling computer game between January 2000 and August 2006. Warcraft III received a "Gold" sales award from the Entertainment and Leisure Software Publishers Association (ELSPA), indicating sales of at least 200,000 copies in the United Kingdom. In France, it sold over 200,000 units by March 2005.

=== Accolades ===
The game was awarded the title "game of the year" by GameSpot as well as "best real-time strategy game of the year" by PC Gamer and received a number of other awards and accolades from critics. In 2018, Rock, Paper, Shotgun declared Warcraft III to be the 34th best strategy game of all time. German magazine GameStar ranked Warcraft III as the best strategy game and the second best PC game of all time in 2018, noting that the game and its expansion pack received scores higher than any other game since.

During the 6th Annual Interactive Achievement Awards, the Academy of Interactive Arts & Sciences awarded Warcraft III with "Computer Strategy Game of the Year"; it also received nominations for "Computer Game of the Year", "Innovation in Computer Gaming", "Outstanding Achievement in Game Design", and "Outstanding Achievement in Original Music Composition".

== Legacy ==
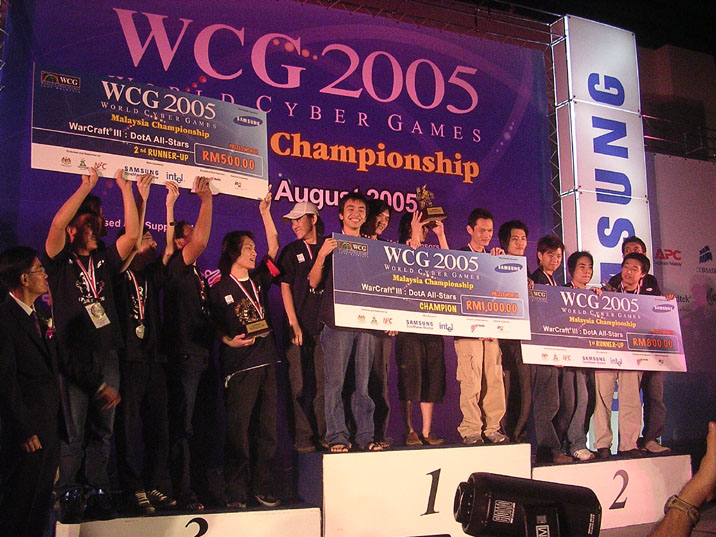
The top three placed teams from the first World Cyber Games Defense of the Ancients championship

Warcraft III has been an influence on real-time strategy games, especially the addition of role-playing elements and heroes as units. More than the game itself, mods created with the World Editor led to lasting changes and inspired many future games. Defense of the Ancients (DotA) paved the way for the multiplayer online battle arena genre, inspiring the creation of the mod's standalone sequel, Dota 2, and games such as League of Legends, Heroes of Newerth, and Heroes of the Storm. Blizzard pointed to DotA as an example of what dedicated mapmakers can create using strong developer's tools. DotA All-stars became an important tournament scenario, starting with its prominence at the debut of Blizzard's BlizzCon convention in 2005. Since then, MOBAs have had a big impact on the development of esports, becoming some of the most watched games in the world. The World Editor was used as a tool for creating many popular tower defense custom maps that served as inspiration for the standalone tower defense games, such as Plants vs. Zombies.

Many of the characters, locations and concepts introduced in Warcraft III and its expansion went on to play major roles in Blizzard's World of Warcraft (2004), which became the world's most popular MMORPG by player count of nearly 10 million in 2009. They also took a notable part in other Blizzard games, such as Hearthstone (2014). The majority of the playable heroes from Warcraft III were featured in their crossover multiplayer game Heroes of the Storm (2015). In October 2018, Comic Book Resources listed four characters introduced in Warcraft III in their list of the Top 25 most iconic characters ever created by Blizzard, including Illidan Stormrage and Jaina Proudmoore.

== See also ==
- Professional Warcraft III competition
- Warcraft: The Board Game
