= Warcraft =

Video game series

- Genres: Real-time strategy, MMORPG, collectible card game
- Developer: Blizzard Entertainment
- Publisher: Blizzard Entertainment
- Creators: Allen Adham; Frank Pearce; Michael Morhaime
- Platforms: MS-DOS, Microsoft Windows, Mac OS, Sega Saturn, PlayStation, iOS, Android
- First release: Warcraft: Orcs & Humans; November 15, 1994
- Latest release: Warcraft Rumble; November 3, 2023

Warcraft is a fantasy video game series and media franchise created by Blizzard Entertainment. The series consists of six core games: Warcraft: Orcs & Humans (1994), Warcraft II: Tides of Darkness (1995), Warcraft III: Reign of Chaos (2002), World of Warcraft (2004), Hearthstone (2014), and Warcraft Rumble (2023). Initially a real-time strategy (RTS) series, Warcraft expanded into other game genres beginning with World of Warcraft, a highly influential massively multiplayer online role-playing game (MMORPG). The franchise has also spawned novels, comics, a tabletop role-playing game, a trading card game, and a 2016 feature film.

The franchise is primarily set on the planet Azeroth, as well as related planets and metaphysical dimensions. Azeroth is inhabited by various races and civilizations, including typical fantasy races such as elves, dwarves, gnomes, orcs, and trolls, along with original races and creatures unique to the franchise. Its lore and story center on warfare between the races and factions of Azeroth, typically between the human-led Alliance and the orc-led Horde, chronicling the exploits of heroes and villains on both sides. While high fantasy at its core, the Warcraft universe incorporates a diverse assortment of influences, including science fiction and dark fantasy. Warcraft has been noted as differentiating itself from other fantasy universes by highlighting "monster races" such as orcs, trolls, and undead as complex protagonists and giving them significant character development and moral complexity.

The Warcraft franchise has been highly successful, grossing over $12 billion in revenue, making it one of the highest-grossing media franchises of all time. The games have been critically acclaimed: the first three Warcraft games are considered landmarks of the RTS genre, while World of Warcraft is regarded as the most popular and influential MMORPG of all time.

== Video games ==
Release timeline Game releases in bold
1994	**Warcraft: Orcs & Humans**
1995	**Warcraft II: Tides of Darkness**
1996	Warcraft II: Beyond the Dark Portal
1997–1998
1999	Warcraft II: Battle.net Edition
2000–2001
2002	**Warcraft III: Reign of Chaos**
2003	Warcraft III: The Frozen Throne
2004	**World of Warcraft**
2005–2006
2007	World of Warcraft: The Burning Crusade
2008	World of Warcraft: Wrath of the Lich King
2009
2010	World of Warcraft: Cataclysm
2011
2012	World of Warcraft: Mists of Pandaria
2013
2014	**Hearthstone**
2014	World of Warcraft: Warlords of Draenor
2015
2016	World of Warcraft: Legion
2017
2018	World of Warcraft: Battle for Azeroth
2019	**World of Warcraft Classic**
2020	**Warcraft III: Reforged**
2020	World of Warcraft: Shadowlands
2021	World of Warcraft: Burning Crusade Classic
2022	World of Warcraft: Wrath of the Lich King Classic
2022	World of Warcraft: Dragonflight
2023	**Warcraft Rumble**
2024	World of Warcraft: Cataclysm Classic
2024	World of Warcraft: The War Within
2024	Warcraft Remastered Battle Chest
2025	World of Warcraft: Mists of Pandaria Classic
2026	World of Warcraft: Midnight
2026	Warcraft III Reforged: Forsaken Kingdom
2026	**World of Warcraft: Forever**
2027	World of Warcraft: The Last Titan

The first three games in the Warcraft series, including their expansion packs, were all released on both the PC and Macintosh. All of these games were of the real-time strategy genre. Each game proceeded to carry on the storyline of the previous games, and each introduced new features and content to improve gameplay. The name "Warcraft" was proposed by Blizzard developer Sam Didier. It was chosen because "it sounded super cool", according to Blizzard co-founder Allen Adham, without any particular meaning attached to it.

Warcraft II: Tides of Darkness was the first game in the series to feature play over the internet using Battle.net, although this was not included until a later release of the game. Warcraft II was also the first in the series to be re-released as a "Battle Chest", a bundled copy of the game containing both the original and expansion. Warcraft III: Reign of Chaos was the first game in the series to feature a Collector's Edition, which all subsequent games have released as well. Warcraft III and World of Warcraft also have both had "Battle Chests" released for them subsequent to their initial release. The "Battle.net" edition of Warcraft II was also the first to introduce the use of CD keys to the series, requiring each user online to have their own copy of the game in order to be able to connect.

In 1998, an adventure game in the series, Warcraft Adventures: Lord of the Clans, was announced as being canceled, having been previously delayed from a 1997 release.

In 2004, Blizzard Entertainment moved the series away from the real-time strategy genre and released World of Warcraft, a massively multiplayer online role-playing game (MMORPG). Requiring a subscription fee to be paid to play, it also introduced regular additional content to the series in the form of patches. World of Warcraft gained popularity worldwide, becoming the world's largest subscription-based MMORPG in 2008. The game reached a peak 12 million subscribers worldwide in October 2010. World of Warcraft has had ten expansions as of 2024, with two more announced. During the production of StarCraft II: Wings of Liberty, Blizzard co-founder Frank Pearce stated that "If there's a team that's passionate about doing another Warcraft [real-time strategy], then that's definitely something we would consider. It's nothing that we're working on right now, we have development teams working on Cataclysm, StarCraft II: Wings of Liberty, Diablo III, and when those teams are all off the projects they're working on, they'll be intimately involved in the discussions about what's next".

In 2013, Blizzard announced a new free-to-play online digital collectible card game, originally titled Hearthstone: Heroes of Warcraft, with the beta being available in summer of 2013. In March 2014, Hearthstone was released. In addition to free-to-play basic gameplay Hearthstone contains fee-based features such as additional card packs.

On May 3, 2022, Blizzard announced a new Warcraft free-to-play mobile game called Warcraft Arclight Rumble.

In 2022, Blizzard and NetEase cancelled an unannounced World of Warcraft mobile spin-off game.

On November 3, 2023, Blizzard released the free-to-play mobile tower defense and action strategy game Warcraft Rumble. At BlizzCon 2023, Blizzard Entertainment unveiled three forthcoming expansions to The War Within, Midnight, and The Last Titan. These expansions collectively constitute the Worldsoul saga, a narrative continuum led by Chris Metzen. Blizzard also announced World of Warcraft: Cataclysm Classic and confirmed their commitment to a more accelerated timeline for future content drops.

In September 2024, it was reported that there were several talks about making Warcraft 4 but due to the poor reception of Warcraft III: Reforged, Blizzard executives turned down the idea.

== Other media ==
=== Tabletop games ===
- Warcraft: The Board Game – strategic board game from Fantasy Flight Games, based on Warcraft III
- Warcraft: The Roleplaying Game – role-playing game from Sword & Sorcery Studios
- World of Warcraft: The Board Game – board game based on World of Warcraft, also by Fantasy Flight Games
- World of Warcraft: The Adventure Game – board game based on World of Warcraft, also by Fantasy Flight Games
- World of Warcraft Miniatures Game – a miniature war game based on World of Warcraft, by Upper Deck Entertainment.
- D&D: World of Warcraft - sourcebook for the 5th edition of the Dungeons & Dragons fantasy role-playing game

=== Collectible card games ===
- World of Warcraft Trading Card Game – 2006–2013

=== Novels ===
- Warcraft: Of Blood and Honor (2000)
- Warcraft: Day of the Dragon (2001)
- Warcraft: Lord of the Clans (2001)
- Warcraft: The Last Guardian (2002)
- Warcraft: War of the Ancients
  - The Well of Eternity (2004)
  - The Demon Soul (2004)
  - The Sundering (2005)
- World of Warcraft: Cycle of Hatred (2006)
- World of Warcraft: Rise of the Horde (2006)
- World of Warcraft: Tides of Darkness (2007)
- World of Warcraft: Beyond the Dark Portal (2008)
- World of Warcraft: Night of the Dragon (2008)
- World of Warcraft: Arthas: Rise of the Lich King (2009)
- World of Warcraft: Stormrage (2010)
- World of Warcraft: The Shattering: Prelude to Cataclysm (2010)
- World of Warcraft: Thrall: Twilight of the Aspects (2011)
- World of Warcraft: Wolfheart (2012)
- World of Warcraft: Jaina Proudmoore: Tides of War (2012)
- World of Warcraft: Vol'jin: Shadows of the Horde (2013)
- World of Warcraft: Dawn of the Aspects (2013)
- World of Warcraft: Paragons (2014)
- World of Warcraft: War Crimes (2014)
- World of Warcraft: Destination: Pandaria (2014)
- World of Warcraft: Chronicle Volume 1 (2016)
- World of Warcraft: Illidan (2016)
- Warcraft: Durotan - The Official Film Prequel (2016)
- Warcraft: The Official Novelization (2016)
- World of Warcraft: Traveler (2016)
- World of Warcraft: Chronicle Volume 2 (2017)
- World of Warcraft: Chronicle Volume 3 (2018)
- World of Warcraft: Traveler: The Spiral Path (2018)
- World of Warcraft: Before the Storm (2018)
- World of Warcraft: Traveler: The Shining Blade (2019)
- World of Warcraft: Shadows Rising (2020)
- World of Warcraft: Sylvanas (2022)
- World of Warcraft: War of the Scaleborn (2023)
- World of Warcraft: Blood Ties (2025)

=== Comics ===
- World of Warcraft (2007–2009), a series published by DC Comics imprint WildStorm.
- World of Warcraft: Ashbringer (2008–2009), a four-issue miniseries published by WildStorm.
- World of Warcraft: Curse of the Worgen (October 9, 2012)
- World of Warcraft: Pearl of Pandaria (September 25, 2012)
- Warcraft Saga Issue 1
- World of Warcraft: Dark Riders (May 7, 2013)
- World of Warcraft: Bloodsworn (August 13, 2013)
- World of Warcraft: Warlords of Draenor (2014) a three-issue series published by Blizzard
- Warcraft: Bonds of Brotherhood (2016)
- World of Warcraft: Legion (2016) a four-issue series published by Blizzard

=== Manga ===
- Warcraft: The Sunwell Trilogy, a manhwa series published by Tokyopop.
  - Dragon Hunt (March 2005)
  - Shadows of Ice (March 2006)
  - Ghostlands (March 2007)
- Warcraft: Legends (2008–2009), a five-part graphic novel series, which is a continuation from The Sunwell Trilogy.
- World of Warcraft: Death Knight (December 1, 2009)
- World of Warcraft: Mage (June 1, 2010)
- World of Warcraft: Shaman (September 28, 2010)
- World of Warcraft: Shadow Wing
  - The Dragons of Outland (June 2010)
  - Nexus Point (March 2011)

=== Magazine ===
In 2009, Blizzard announced that it would be releasing a magazine with Future US Ltd. This magazine would be purchasable by online subscription, and not for sale in newsagents or stores, making them collector's items. The magazine released quarterly, and each contained 148 pages. No advertisements were included in the magazine. In September 2011, Blizzard announced that the magazine was ceasing publication. Refunds, plush toys or in-game pets were given to subscribers depending on the outstanding length of subscription.

=== Film adaptation ===
In a May 9, 2006 press release, Blizzard Entertainment and Legendary Pictures announced that they would develop a live-action film set in the Warcraft universe. At BlizzCon 2008, according to Mike Morhaime, a script was being written.

In January 2013, Duncan Jones was announced to direct the adaptation, from a script by Charles Leavitt. The film was set to begin principal photography in early 2014 with a plot based on the novel Warcraft: The Last Guardian. On July 20, 2013, Legendary Pictures and Warner Bros. Entertainment unveiled a sizzle reel during their San Diego Comic-Con 2013 panel, with Duncan Jones hopping on stage briefly to discuss the project. Production on the film started shooting on January 13, 2014. The first full-length trailer for the film was released on November 6, 2015. Warcraft premiered in Los Angeles on June 6, 2016, and was released by Universal Pictures in the United States on June 10, 2016. It received mostly negative reviews from critics, but grossed $439 million worldwide against a reported budget of $160 million.

=== Heroes of the Storm ===
In 2015, Blizzard released Heroes of the Storm, a crossover multiplayer online battle arena video game in which players can control various characters from Blizzard's franchises as playable heroes, the majority of which come from the Warcraft universe. The game also features numerous mounts based on mounts or other creatures from World of Warcraft, as well as a battleground based on the PvP zone Alterac Pass. A number of Warcraft-themed skins have been introduced for Heroes of the Storm in the “Echoes of Alterac” event in June 2018. Various soundtracks from World of Warcraft, such as Obsidian Sanctum from Wrath of the Lich King, The Wandering Isle from Mists of Pandaria, and Stormwind theme, are present as background music in the game. Heroes of the Storm is inspired by Defense of the Ancients, a community-created mod based on Warcraft III.

== Setting ==
=== Location ===
Most of the Warcraft series takes place on the planet of Azeroth. Other planets in the Warcraft universe include: Draenor (and its sundered remnants, known as Outland), Argus, K'aresh, Mardum (also known as the Shattered Abyss), Xoroth, Rancora, and Nathreza. There are also several metaphysical areas mentioned, including the Emerald Dream, the Elemental Planes, the Twisting Nether, the Great Dark Beyond, and the Shadowlands. Warcraft: Orcs & Humans, the first game in the series, takes place in Azeroth.

==== Azeroth ====
Azeroth has four known continents, named the Eastern Kingdoms, Kalimdor, Northrend, and recently rediscovered Pandaria, the homeland of the pandaren. All continents are separated by the Great Sea. Three major archipelagos also reside in the Great Sea: the Broken Isles; Zandalar, the birthplace of the troll civilization; Kul Tiras, a maritime human nation; and the Dragon Isles, the birthplace of the dragons.

In the center of the Great Sea is an enormous, everlasting vortex called the "Maelstrom" beneath which lies the aquatic city of Nazjatar, home of the amphibious Naga. Near the Maelstrom lies the volcanic Isle of Kezan, home of the goblins.

==== Draenor (Outland) ====
Draenor, which is featured in Warcraft II: Beyond the Dark Portal, is the original homeland of the Orcs and past home of the Draenei. Draenor was torn apart when the Orcish leader, Ner'Zhul (later the first Lich King) opened dozens of portals to other worlds in an attempt to escape the invading Alliance Armies from Azeroth. The sheer number and combined power of the portals ripped Draenor into fragments and cast the remainder into the mysterious parallel dimension called the Twisting Nether, Home of the Demons.

The remnants of the world are now known as Outland. It is featured in the last mission of the human campaign of Warcraft II: Beyond the Dark Portal, Warcraft III: The Frozen Throne and more prominently in World of Warcraft: The Burning Crusade.

An intact Draenor is the main feature of the fifth World of Warcraft expansion, Warlords of Draenor, which takes place 35 years earlier in an alternate timeline.

=== Major races and factions ===
The early Warcraft games centre on conflict between humans and the orcish Horde. In Tides of Darkness, the human kingdoms form the Alliance to resist the Horde. The second game also expanded the armies with units drawn from other fantasy peoples as both sides gain allies from other peoples, including dwarves and high elves for the Alliance, and trolls and ogres for the Horde.

Reign of Chaos has four playable factions: the Human Alliance, the Orcish Horde, the Night Elves and the Undead Scourge. Under Thrall, the Horde frees itself from demonic influence and forms alliances with other peoples, including trolls and tauren, a race of bovine humanoids. The Scourge is an army of undead commanded by the Lich King. It was created by the Burning Legion, an army of demons led by Sargeras, to prepare Azeroth for invasion. In the expansion The Frozen Throne, the Scourge comes into conflict with the Legion, while a group of undead breaks away from the Lich King and becomes known as the Forsaken. The Scourge remains a major enemy in Wrath of the Lich King, in which players confront the Lich King in his stronghold of Icecrown Citadel.

In World of Warcraft, the Alliance and Horde are the principal player factions. Each faction initially offered four playable races, including dwarves, gnomes and night elves for the Alliance, and trolls, tauren and the Forsaken for the Horde. Later expansions added more playable races. The panda-like pandaren, introduced as a playable race in Mists of Pandaria, were the first whose players could choose either faction. Later updates allowed players from opposing factions to form groups for selected activities and join the same guilds.

== Reception ==
In 1999, Next Generation listed Warcraft and StarCraft as number 32 on their "Top 50 Games of All Time", commenting that, "While Warcraft did not create the realtime strategy genre, it made it appealing to a broad audience. Warcraft II went on to refine the genre. Easy to play, nuanced in design, a pleasure to look at, and often a laugh riot, Warcraft II was nearly perfect."

By 2004, the series sold more than 15 million units.
