= Warcraft III: The Frozen Throne =

2003 video game expansion

- Warcraft III: The Frozen Throne cover
- Developer: Blizzard Entertainment
- Publisher: Blizzard Entertainment
- Director: Frank Pearce Jr.
- Producer: Chris Sigaty
- Designer: Rob Pardo
- Writer: Chris Metzen
- Composers: Tracy W. Bush; Victor Crews; Derek Duke; Jason Hayes; Glenn Stafford
- Series: Warcraft
- Platforms: Microsoft Windows, Mac OS X
- Release: NA: July 1, 2003; AU: July 3, 2003; EU: July 4, 2003
- Genre: Real-time strategy
- Modes: Single-player, multiplayer

Warcraft III: The Frozen Throne is an expansion pack for Warcraft III: Reign of Chaos, a real-time strategy video game by Blizzard Entertainment. It was released worldwide on July 1, 2003, for Microsoft Windows and Mac OS X. The Frozen Throne builds upon the story of Reign of Chaos, and depicts the events after the main game's conclusion. The single-player unfolds from the perspective of two new protagonists, the Night Elf warden Maiev Shadowsong and the Blood Elf prince Kael'thas Sunstrider, as well as returning protagonist Arthas Menethil. Additionally, the expansion contains Act I of a separate Horde campaign that is independent from the main storyline with Blizzard releasing Acts II and III via patch in December 2003, taking in player feedback of Act I when developing these chapters.

The expansion adds new units, buildings and heroes for each faction, two new auxiliary races, five neutral heroes (with three more later added by patches) as well as a number of tweaks to the gameplay and balancing. Sea units were reintroduced, which were absent in Reign of Chaos. Battle.net-powered multiplayer was expanded by the addition of clans, automated tournaments and new maps and custom scenarios.

Development began in October 2002, shortly after the release of the main game and the expansion was announced on January 22, 2003. Public beta tests allowed 20,000 players in two series of trials to play with the new features. Support continued even after release, with Blizzard adding new content and balancing changes as well as support for newer hardware.

The Frozen Throne received generally favorable reviews from critics. Most reviewers praised the mission design of the single-player campaign for deviating from the standard real-time strategy game formula. The design and audio of the new units was generally positively, though a few critics bemoaned the graphics and some of the voice-acting. By August 15, 2003, it had sold more than one million copies.

== Gameplay ==
Warcraft III: The Frozen Throne is a real-time strategy video game that puts players in control of a group of units and buildings in order to achieve a variety of goals. The expansion fine-tunes the gameplay of the main game rather than changing it. The food limit and the upkeep requirements, which dealt a penalty on resource gain when too many units were active at the same time, have both been increased slightly, leading to the ability to mobilize somewhat larger and more powerful forces. The cost of buildings has been decreased as well, allowing for a quicker start of the game. The weapon and armor type system has been completely revamped and a lot of units have had their weapon or armor types changed, and the weapon types are effective and ineffective against different armor types compared to Reign of Chaos. Changes to building costs and the addition of new early-game defensive structures serve to deter early-game tactics that relied on rushing the enemy with hero units. In addition to treasure items found in the main game, enemies now will also leave "runes" upon defeat that can be used to replenish health or mana. In addition, The Frozen Throne re-introduces naval battles, which were previously featured in Warcraft II: Tides of Darkness and its expansion, but almost completely absent in Warcraft III.

Naga units standing in a Naga base complete with production and defense buildings.

For each faction, The Frozen Throne adds several new units and buildings, including a player-controlled shop, and one new hero, a kind of powerful unit which each can only be recruited once, per faction. To complement the new shop, normal units can be upgraded to carry items. Two new Factions, the Naga and Draenei, have also been added. The Naga feature in all four campaigns and have their own production and defense buildings as well as unique units with separate skills. While enemies in some single-player missions, players can control them in others. The Draenei on the other hand are found only in one of the campaigns and are classified by Blizzard as creeps, i.e. neutral units that attack all parties equally. The expansion also added five neutral hero units, some of which appear in the single player campaigns. Neutral heroes can be used in melee maps via the Tavern, a neutral building used to hire them. The tavern can also instantly revive any fallen hero, with an increased resource cost, and reduced health and mana of the revived hero.

The single player missions have been given more varied objectives, ranging from controlling multiple armies at the same time to forcing players to make do with only a limited number of units. Unlike in previous Warcraft games, Blizzard did not include the orcs in the main campaign. According to level designer Tim Campbell, the company failed to come up with a plausible story-based reason why orcs should appear in the main story line. Blizzard instead decided to create a more RPG-driven campaign that focuses on controlling one or multiple heroes on a network of interlinked maps. As such, base building, resource gathering and unit training are absent from most of the campaign while heroes can be leveled up past the normal 10-level limit. The Horde campaign contains almost 40 items specifically created for it. Both campaigns combined add approximately 40 hours of new gameplay.

When playing against the computer on a custom map, players can now select a difficulty level for the computer opponent. The multiplayer aspect was expanded upon with the implementation of clans and automated tournaments that include a strict 30-minute time limit. It also added the ability to chat with others while waiting for a game. The expansion includes 62 new multiplayer maps and custom scenarios based on popular mods and allows up to twelve players at the same time. If an ally leaves the game, their resources are now shown in a separate window and can be transferred.

The Frozen Throne also includes an improved version of the World Editor program that can be used to create custom maps and scenarios to play against the computer or other players. The improved World Editor allows the user to do more custom work with regards to editing skills, providing more functions in the triggers, new units, more global map settings, and three new tile-sets to work with. Creators can now link multiple maps together and make events on one map affect another map. The Horde campaign was specifically made with the goal in mind of showcasing what the new World Editor was capable of. While Blizzard does not officially support the World Editor, the Frozen Throne version offers more options and documentation.

== Synopsis ==
=== Settings and characters ===
The Frozen Throne takes place on the fictional high fantasy world of Azeroth. In the main game, the human paladin Arthas Menethil was corrupted by the Lich King Ner'zhul, an undead sorcerer entrapped in ice (the titular "Frozen Throne"), and became his lieutenant. Arthas invaded the High Elven kingdom and killed its general, Sylvanas Windrunner, whom he resurrected to serve him. He then paved the way for an invasion by the Burning Legion—a demonic force from another realm—who were ultimately defeated by an alliance of elves, humans, and orcs. In the events leading up to the victory against the Legion, Night Elf leader Tyrande Whisperwind freed the imprisoned Illidan Stormrage. However, Illidan consumed a demonic relic, becoming half-demon himself, and was cast out. After the Burning Legion's defeat, Illidan was contacted by Kil'jaeden, one of the remaining masters of the Legion, who tasks him with destroying the rebellious Lich King.

The expansion introduces new factions to the game's universe: The Blood Elves, former High Elves that now suffer from addiction to magic; the Naga, mutated former Night Elves; the Draenei, the original inhabitants of Draenor, the orc homeworld now known as Outland; and the Pandaren, a race of globetrotting, anthropomorphic pandas. The Frozen Throne follows the quest of the Night Elf warden Maiev Shadowsong to recapture the renegade Illidan Stormrage, Blood Elf prince Kael'thas Sunstrider's struggle with the Alliance and subsequent service to Illidan, Arthas' attempt to rescue the Lich King from Illidan's assault, and Sylvanas Windrunner's fight for independence. The Horde campaign is separate from the other three, being a stand-alone story and using more role-playing game mechanics over real-time strategy game mechanics. The campaign chronicles the early days of the Horde's newly established kingdom from the perspective of the beastmaster hero Rexxar.

=== Plot ===
Maiev Shadowsong pursues the fugitive Illidan to a set of islands. There, she finds Illidan has allied himself with the Naga and obtained an artifact called the Eye of Sargeras, forcing Maiev to call on Illidan's brother Malfurion Stormrage and Malfurion's wife Tyrande Whisperwind for aid. Illidan flees with the eye to the kingdom of Lordaeron. When Tyrande is swept away by a river while helping a group of Blood Elves led by the prince Kael'thas, Maiev convinces Malfurion that she died to maintain their pursuit of Illidan. They capture Illidan and destroy the Eye, which Illidan reveals he was using to destroy the Lich King. When Kael'thas informs him that Tyrande may still be alive, he uses the Naga to help Malfurion find and rescue her. In thanks, Malfurion pardons him for his past crimes. With Maiev still in pursuit, Illidan flees to Outland.

In Lordaeron, the Blood Elves are in an uneasy alliance with Garithos, the racist human commander of the remaining Alliance forces. When their prince Kael'thas is only able to complete a number of demeaning tasks with the help of Illidan's Naga, Garithos imprisons Kael'thas and his forces for treason. The Naga leader rescues them and leads them to Outland, where they join forces with Illidan, who promises to satisfy their addiction to magic. Together, they take over Outland. Illidan's master Kil'jaeden finds Illidan and plans to punish him for failing to destroy the Lich King, but decides not to when Illidan claims that he traveled to Outland to recruit forces for a new assault.

Arthas returns to the Undead-controlled regions of Lordaeron where three dreadlords loyal to the Burning Legion - Balnazzar, Detheroc, and Varimathras - rule. Arthas informs them of the Legion's defeat and retreat before declaring himself king. While purging the kingdom of the remnants of the Alliance aided by Sylvanas Windrunner and the Lich Kel'Thuzad, Arthas notices that his powers have diminished. The Lich King telepathically contacts Arthas and explains his loss of power is a result of Illidan's attacks, and summons him to defend the Frozen Throne. Arthas leaves for Northrend where he, with the help of the Lich King's minions, defeats Illidan in a duel. Arthas shatters the ice of the throne and dons the Lich King's helmet, thereby joining their souls and becoming the new Lich King. Meanwhile, in Lordaeron, Sylvanas is freed from the Lich King's control. With the help of Varimathras, she kills the remaining two dreadlords and Garithos and declares Lordaeron the home of the free undead, rechristened the "Forsaken".

Untouched by the events in Lordaeron and Northrend, Horde Warchief Thrall builds a new kingdom called Durotar on the continent of Kalimdor. Rexxar, a half-ogre beastmaster and adventurer, is tasked by Thrall and other inhabitants to help build the kingdom. He is aided by Rokhan, a troll shadow hunter. Rexxar learns that humans from the island of Theramore plan to invade Durotar, led by Admiral Daelin Proudmoore, who is unwilling to accept the truce between humans and the Horde. With the help of the admiral's guilt-ridden daughter, Jaina Proudmoore, he leads an assault on Theramore, slays the admiral, and leaves Jaina in command of the city.

== Development ==
Immediately after the release, Blizzard began brainstorming content for an expansion and development began in October 2002. The Frozen Throne was officially announced on January 22, 2003. With the previous success of StarCraft: Brood War, expectations were high for Blizzard to create another expansion that rivaled the original in both length and new content. A main focus when developing the expansion was studying the way players used the different races and units in order to identify in which area each race needed to be strengthened, leading to the development of new units and spells to meet these demands. Examples include giving Orcs a low level way to heal units and adding a human unit that can disable enemy towers from the air. When designing the campaigns, the levels were created with the new heroes' abilities in mind.

Blizzard's Bill Roper first offered a preview of the new expansion in February 2003 before Blizzard debuted the single player campaign at E3 2003. Roper also teased that the Naga would be introduced as a new race, which ultimately was not included in the final expansion. On February 14, 2003, Blizzard announced the first beta test for the game, which offered 10,000 players a chance to sample the game. On March 10, 2003, 10,000 more players were selected to participate in the beta test. On April 1, 2003, Blizzard teased that the Pandaren would become a fifth faction in the upcoming expansion and even created an entry on the official homepage detailing heroes, history and units. While this was only an elaborate April Fools' Day prank, the final expansion did include the Pandaren Brewmaster as one of the neutral heroes which could also be unlocked in single-player in a secret mission. On May 29, 2003, Blizzard announced that the expansion set had "gone gold". It was released in 2003 in North America on July 1, Australia on July 3, and in Europe on July 4, 2003.

Blizzard continued to support The Frozen Throne with new patches that fixes problems and added new content, such as adding an additional neutral hero in May 2004 and two more in August 2004. The expansion also only included the first chapter of the Horde campaign upon release with Acts II and III released as part of a patch in December 2003. This allowed Blizzard to take fan feedback into account when creating the next two chapters of the campaign. There have been many patches released for the game, including patch 1.21b, which allowed the game to be started without the official CD. In April 2018, Blizzard integrated proper widescreen support for the first time, more than 15 years after the game's original release.

== Reception ==
=== Critical reception ===
Reception

Aggregate score
Aggregator	Score
Metacritic	88/100

Review scores
Publication	Score
Game Informer	9/10
GameRevolution	B+
GameSpot	9.2/10
GameSpy	88%
GameZone	9.4/10
IGN	9.0/10
PC Gamer (US)	83%

The Frozen Throne received a rating of 88/100 from review aggregator Metacritic indicating generally positive reviews from critics, with only a single review below 80.

Critics liked that the new units and heroes fit well visually in the existing game world and compared the quality of the cinematics favorably to the highly praised cinematics of the main game. Both the voice acting and the new music were noted positively by reviewers, although Strategy Gaming Online noted that the music repeats itself too often. Conversely, PC Gamer considered the cutscenes using the in-game graphics dated and called the voice-acting "a tad amateurish". 4Players and Game Informer also criticized the low resolution graphics. GameSpy found most unit voices excellent but criticized that the whole troll race sounds like "Rastafarian outcasts".

The new heroes and units were widely considered a good fit and helpful for improving balance by negating some problematic areas, such as the Night Elves' lack of tank units. IGN particularly liked the Naga in both design and concept, especially the fact that they have their own advantages and magical abilities. GameStar and PC Games lauded that the new mechanics of defeated enemies leaving health and mana runes in missions with limited units helps avoid previously necessary regenerating phases, improving the game's flow.

Most reviewers praised the variety of missions in the single player campaign as a feat of storytelling and innovation, especially that the standard "build base, recruit units, kill enemy" formula was only used in a few missions. GameSpot even called it the "most skillfully designed single-player scenarios" of any real-time strategy game to that date and appreciated how the varied missions are still all plausible in the context of the game. Despite the praise, reviews also noted that the expansion's story is more buildup than resolution when it is supposed to be the culmination of the main game's storyline. PC Gamer also criticized the story as being too long to be interesting, dismissing the Night Elf campaign as mostly unnecessary. Many reviewers also liked the choice to have a separate Orc campaign with its RPG elements, likening the gameplay to Blizzard's Diablo series. Conversely, many critics also found it annoying that enemies respawn in the Horde campaign, forcing players to replay the same fights.

The improved multiplayer and skirmish options, especially the various new AI difficulty levels and the multiplayer improvements with clans, tournaments, and ranked game searches, were praised by critics. GameSpot also emphasized in its review that many new unit types were designed to counter particular strategies in multiplayer, while GameSpy found that the new units focusing on countering magic leads to a more involved multiplayer game. Strategy Gaming Online opined that the multiplayer "felt like a letdown" as it lacks some of the features of the campaign but admitted that the improvements made were significant and enhanced the experience. Like a number of other critics, Strategy Gaming Online bemoaned that the Naga were not added as a new playable race for multiplayer.

=== Sales ===
The Frozen Throne was the most-sold PC game in the first three weeks of July 2003 and was also the best-selling PC game of June 2003 due to preorders. The expansion sold more than one million copies by August 15, 2003. The Frozen Throne received a "Silver" sales award from the Entertainment and Leisure Software Publishers Association (ELSPA), indicating sales of at least 100,000 copies in the United Kingdom.

=== Accolades ===
German video gaming magazine GameStar called The Frozen Throne the best add-on in PC gaming history and as of July 2018 had not awarded another score as high as the expansion has. The editors of Computer Gaming World nominated The Frozen Throne for their 2003 "Expansion Pack of the Year" award, but it lost to Battlefield 1942: Secret Weapons of WWII. It was also a runner-up for Computer Games Magazine's "Expansion of the Year" award, which ultimately went to EverQuest: Lost Dungeons of Norrath. The Age called The Frozen Throne the best expansion pack for PC of 2003, while GameSpot named it the best computer game of July 2003. At the first Spike Video Game Awards in 2003, The Frozen Throne was nominated for the "Best PC Game" and "Best Animation" category, but lost to Halo: Combat Evolved and Dead or Alive Xtreme Beach Volleyball respectively.

== Legacy ==
The Frozen Throne's Horde campaign lays the groundwork for World of Warcraft with many of the player's actions in the campaign being later explored in the MMORPG. Similarly, other elements that were introduced or fleshed out in the expansion went on to become the focus in World of Warcraft expansions, such the Draenei and Blood Elves as well as the world of Outland in The Burning Crusade, the fall and death of Arthas as the Lich King in Wrath of the Lich King and the Pandaren race in Mists of Pandaria. In 2017, Blizzard released an expansion to their Hearthstone digital collectible card game entitled Knights of the Frozen Throne that, among other allusions to The Frozen Throne, contains an undead version of Rexxar the beastmaster. The majority of the playable heroes added in the expansion The Frozen Throne, including five neutral heroes, reprised their role in the crossover multiplayer online battle arena Heroes of the Storm. A Night Elf unit from the expansion, the Mountain Giant, appears as a boss in the Warcraft-themed battleground.
