= Inside West Coast Customs =

American car remodeling TV show

- Country of origin: United States
- Original language: English
- No. of seasons: 8
- No. of episodes: 68

Production
- Producers: Ryan Friedlinghaus; Discovery
- Production locations: Corona, California, US; Burbank, California, US
- Camera setup: Multi-camera
- Running time: 60 minutes

Original release
- Network: Discovery, Fox Sports 2, Motor Trend
- Release: February 20, 2011 – April 10, 2018

Inside West Coast Customs is a car remodeling reality television show based in Burbank, California. The series revolves around car customizer Ryan Friedlinghaus and his staff at West Coast Customs as they transform ordinary, factory-model vehicles into extraordinary, fully customized vehicles. The show has featured cameo appearances by celebrities that include Shaquille O'Neal, Mark Wahlberg, will.i.am, Justin Bieber and Conan O'Brien.

The first season of Inside West Coast Customs consisted of 11 episodes which originally aired in 2011. The second season's 16 episodes followed in 2012. The third season had a production run of five episodes which were originally broadcast from February 2013 to March 2013. Following season 3, the show briefly dropped the Inside from the name and changed networks to Fox Sports 2. For its seventh season, Inside West Coast Customs kept its original name and moved to Velocity (now Motor Trend). Inside West Coast Customs premiered its eighth season in 2018.

== Series overview ==
Season	Episodes	Originally released	
Season	Episodes	First released	Last released
1	10	February 20, 2011	April 18, 2011
2	16	September 11, 2011	April 15, 2012
3	5	February 10, 2013	March 10, 2013
4	10	June 16, 2013	November 17, 2013
5	12	April 20, 2014	December 21, 2014
6	7	December 6, 2015	January 17, 2016
7	7	March 21, 2017	April 18, 2017
8	10	January 23, 2018	April 10, 2018

== Episodes ==
=== Season 1 ===
No. overall	No. in season	Title	Type of car	Customer	Original release date
1	1	"The Armored Lounge for Sir Richard Branson"	Armored truck	Virgin Gaming	20 February 2011
2	2	"Alien Takeover"	Hummer H1	Alienware	20 February 2011
3	3	"Smoothie Operator"	RV	JuiceBlendz	27 February 2011
4	4	"Techno Denali"	GMC Yukon Denali	HP	6 March 2011
5	5	"Old... Meets New"	Chevrolet Camaro	Monster Energy	13 March 2011
6	6	"Not Your Grandparents RV"	RV	Spy Optics	20 March 2011
7	7	"This Is Not a Game"	Audi R8	Monster Cable Tron	27 March 2011
8	8	"Baja or Bust"	Toyota Tundra	OX	3 April 2011
9	9	"Discovery Hot Dog Hero"	Hot Dog cart	Best Buy / Discovery	10 April 2011
10	10	"Take the T-Tops Out"	Chevrolet Camaro	Rascal Flatts	18 April 2011

=== Season 2 ===
No. overall	No. in season	Title	Type of car	Customer	Original release date
11	1	"Gwynn's Legacy Stang"	Ford Mustang	Darrell Gwynn Foundation	11 September 2011
12	2	"Vett.I.am"	Chevrolet Corvette	will.i.am	4 October 2011
13	3	"7 Step Fiesta"	Ford Fiesta	Best Buy / Ford	16 October 2011
14	4	"American Icon"	Jeep Wrangler	Zippo	23 October 2011
15	5	"Marks Mobile Office"	Cadillac Escalade	Mark Wahlberg	30 October 2011
16	6	"Bieber's Bling"	Cadillac CTS-V	Justin Bieber	6 November 2011
17	7	"Kustom Karts"	-	Nintendo / Mario Kart 7	22 January 2012
18	8	"Monster Week"	'72 Skylark	Monster Energy	12 February 2012
19	9	"DC Tundra"	Toyota Tundra	DC Shoes	19 February 2012
20	10	"Operation Camaro"	Chevrolet Camaro	UCLA Operation Mend	26 February 2012
21	11	"Double Play"	Kia Soul, Kia Optima	Kia Motors	4 March 2012
22	12	"The SEMA Experience"	Mini Cooper	Megan Elliott (Ryan's wife)	11 March 2012
23	13	"Micro Stang"	Ford Mustang	Microsoft	25 March 2012
24	14	"Camaro For a Cause"	2011 Chevrolet Camaro	American Cancer Society	1 April 2012
25	15	"Family Affair"	Trophy truck / Fiat 500 / Mercedes Sprinter	Fiat Automobiles / Ryan Friedlinghaus / Dylan Friedlinghaus	8 April 2012
26	16	"Vader's Ride"	Volkswagen Passat	LucasArts	15 April 2012

=== Season 3 ===
No. overall	No. in season	Title	Type of car	Customer	Original release date
27	1	"Shaq's Back"	Jeep Wrangler	Shaquille O'Neal	10 February 2013
28	2	"SkypeStream"	Airstream	Skype	17 February 2013
29	3	"WCC Joins the Military"	Chevrolet Silverado	Marine Corps Base Camp Pendleton	24 February 2013
30	4	"Firefall-bus"	Tour bus	Red 5 Studios, Firefall	3 March 2013
31	5	"Geek Squad"	NASCAR Ford Fusion & Volkswagen New Beetle	Geek Squad	10 March 2013

=== Season 4 ===
No. overall	No. in season	Title	Type of car	Customer	Original release date
32	1	"AquaMan & The Flash"	Kia Rio, Kia Forte	DC Entertainment	16 June 2013
33	2	"WCC Body Armour"	2013 Chevrolet Camaro	Line-X, Praxair	23 June 2013
34	3	"South of the Border Buses"	Volkswagen Type 2 Bus	Ohana Group, Semyx	30 June 2013
35	4	"Attack of the Monster Kids Sprinter"	Mercedes-Benz Sprinter	Monster Cable, Praxair	7 July 2013
36	5	"Technoliner"	A big bus	CDW, Red Kap	14 July 2013
37	6	"Chris Brown's First Love"	Lamborghini Gallardo	Chris Brown	21 July 2013
38	7	"Smurfs Come to WCC"	Innova Dash UEV	Sony, Smurf Cars	28 July 2013
39	8	"Cool Capable Braun Explorer"	Ford Explorer	BraunAbility	4 August 2013
40	9	"The Road Home"	Ford E-250, 1960s Chevy Suburban, 1969 Ford Mustang Convertible	eBay	10 November 2013
41	10	"Cracker Jack'd Mobile Splash Party"	A big R.V.	Cracker Jack	17 November 2013

=== Season 5 ===
No. overall	No. in season	Title	Type of car	Customer	Original release date
42	1	"Kid's Kaddy"	Cadillac Fleetwood Brougham	Kid Rock	20 April 2014
43	2	"Mad Max"	1971 Ford Maverick, 1998 Ford Ranger	Warner Brothers	27 April 2014
44	3	"Who's the Boss"	2013 Scion FR-S	"Little" Ryan Friedlinghaus	4 May 2014
45	4	"The West Coast Customs Experience"	2013 Chrysler 300 SRT	SEMA Show	11 May 2014
46	5	"Looking Back"	(greatest hits)	(various)	18 May 2014
47	6	"Continental Tire Corvette"	2014 Chevrolet Corvette Stingray	Continental AG	28 May 2014
48	7	"El Rusty"	1966 Chevrolet El Camino	Rusty Wallace	1 June 2014
49	8	"FANtasy Build"	Jeep Compass	Esurance	23 November 2014
50	9	"Nest Protects"	A FireTruck	Nest Labs	30 November 2014
51	10	"BatSUV"	Cadillac Escalade	Justin Bieber's dad	7 December 2014
52	11	"Raise the Roof"	2015 Toyota Sienna	Toyota	14 December 2014
53	12	"WCC's New Zip Part 1"	Burbank location	West Coast Customs	21 December 2014

=== Season 6 ===
No. overall	No. in season	Title	Type of car	Customer	Original release date
54	1	"WCC's New Zip Part 2"	Burbank location	West Coast Customs	6 December 2015
55	2	"Top Up Top Down"	1968 Ford Mustang convertible	Sandy Campanaro	13 December 2015
56	3	"Jack N' 4 Beats"	An old trailer	Jack Daniel's	19 December 2015
57	4	"BBQ's Galore"	A box truck	Barbeques Galore	9 January 2016
58	5	"Sema"	Toyota	Toyota	10 January 2016
59	6	"Slingshaq"	Polaris Slingshot	Shaquille O'Neal	17 January 2016
59	7	"Larry's Tailgate 2000"	Tailgate 2000	Larry and Doctor Peper	17 January 2016

=== Season 7 ===
No. overall	No. in season	Title	Type of car	Customer	Original release date
60	1	"Steampunk VW"	60's split window VW bus	Fred Behr	21 March 2017
61	2	"The KMART Experience"	A bus	Kmart	28 March 2017
62	3	"Sriracha IS"	Lexus IS	Lexus, Huy Fong Foods	4 April 2017
63	4	"Quickjack/SEMA"	BMW i3, Ford Raptor, Ford Mustang, golf cart	BMW, BendPak	11 April 2017
64	5	"Kid Jennings"	Cadillac Eldorado	Kid Rock	18 April 2017

=== Season 8 ===
No. overall	No. in season	Title	Type of car	Customer	Original release date
65	1	"Post Malone's Old Skool Explorer"	1992 Ford Explorer	Post Malone	6 November 2017
66	2	"Mitsubishi (Re)Model-A"	Mitsubishi Outlander/Mitsubishi Model A	Mitsubishi	6 November 2017
67	3	"Green Day's Bookmobile Tour Bus"	GMC Bookmobile	Wheels For Wishes	23 January 2018
68	4	"Rollin' in my 5.0"	1993 Ford Mustang, Lamborghini Aventador	Andy Campanaro, Travis Scott	30 January 2018
69	5	"Black Panther Lexus"	Lexus LC 500	Lexus	6 February 2018
70	6	"From School Bus To Coolbus"	Schoolbus	Logan Paul	13 February 2018
71	7	"SEMA Neckbreakers"	Kia Stinger, Kia Cadenza	Kia	20 February 2018
72	8	"WCC's Pumping Iron"	Trailer	Gunnar Peterson, Jared Lorenzen, Jordan Clarkson	13 March 2018
73	9	"El Dorado Seville"	1957 Cadillac Eldorado Seville	KenGee Erlich	20 March 2018
74	10	"Joe Jonas Falcon"	1964 Ford Falcon	Joe Jonas	27 March 2018
75	11	"The Continental Camaro"	1969 Chevrolet Camaro	Continental Tire	3 April 2018
76	12	"Ultimate Rescue Truck"	Bus	Jake Paul	10 April 2018
