= Entertainment Software Association =

US trade association of the video game industry

- Logo
- Formation: April 1994; 32 years ago
- Type: Trade association
- Legal status: 501(c)(5) organization
- Headquarters: Washington, D.C., U.S.
- Location: United States
- President & CEO: Stanley Pierre-Louis
- Website: www.theesa.com
- Formerly called: Interactive Digital Software Association (1994–2003)

The Entertainment Software Association (ESA) is the trade association of the video game industry in the United States. It was formed in April 1994 as the Interactive Digital Software Association (IDSA) and renamed on July 21, 2003. It is based in Washington, D.C. Most of the top publishers in the video game industry (or their American subsidiaries) are members of the ESA.

The ESA also organized the annual Electronic Entertainment Expo (E3) trade expo in Los Angeles, California. The ESA's policy is based by member companies serving on the ESA's three Working Groups: "Intellectual Property Working Group", "Public Policy Committee" and "Public Relations Working Group".

== History ==
The concept of the IDSA/ESA arose from the controversies that the violence depicted in the video game Mortal Kombat drew. This led to a United States Congress hearing in late 1993, where the video game industry was put under scrutiny for the level of violence in games like Mortal Kombat and Night Trap. During these hearings, Sega and Nintendo blamed the other for the situation, citing differences in how they would rate the content of games for players. Following the hearings, Congressman Joe Lieberman proposed the Video Game Ratings Act of 1994, which would have set a government-overseen commission to establish a ratings system for video games, and threatened to push it through legislation if the video game industry did not voluntarily come up with one of its own. Recognizing the threat of government oversight, the companies decided to establish the IDSA to be a unified front and represent all video game companies at this level, and subsequently developed the Entertainment Software Ratings Board (ESRB) to create a voluntary but standardized rating approach to video games. At first, Sega proposed to IDSA that they wanted to use the Videogame Rating Council ratings, but Nintendo turned down the proposal, fearing it was out of place. In July 1994, IDSA representatives returned to Congress to present the ESRB, which Congress accepted and became the standard for the American industry.

The IDSA formally renamed itself to the Entertainment Software Association (ESA) on July 21, 2003. The renaming was made to reflect that the associated companies were primarily in the realm of creating entertainment software across ranges of devices, and the new name was selected to more clearly define the industry. Doug Lowenstein founded the ESA. On December 14, 2006, game blog Kotaku reported that he was resigning to take a job in finance outside the industry. On May 17, 2007, Mike Gallagher replaced Doug Lowenstein as the president of the ESA.

In 2019, Variety reported that Gallagher had lost the confidence of the board of directors over a number of related issues in the preceding years. His office was characterized as a toxic work environment in which he pitted his subordinates against each other and sent them belittling messages. He also fired an experienced high-level employee in favor of a new employee he preferred. With the 2016 election of Donald Trump, Gallagher attempted to publicly align the ESA with Trump's policies, such as the Tax Cuts and Jobs Act of 2017, which was unpopular with members of the association. Robert A. Altman and Phil Spencer, then the chair and vice-chair of the board, respectively, spearheaded an internal investigation into Gallagher's conduct. Gallagher announced on October 3, 2018, that he would be stepping down as president; then ESA senior vice-president Stanley Pierre-Louis served as interim president during ESA's search for a permanent replacement. In the end, ESA opted to elect Pierre-Louis as the permanent president and CEO in May 2019.

== Activities ==
In addition to overseeing the ESRB, the ESA organized the Electronic Entertainment Expo (E3). After the IDSA's formation, the video game industry became concerned over the treatment they had received at recent Consumer Electronic Shows and were seeking another trade show venue. The IDSA partnered with International Data Group (IDG) to organize the first E3, held in May 1995 at the Los Angeles Convention Center in Los Angeles. The first E3 proved more successful than originally expected, and the IDSA negotiated with the IDG to take ownership of E3 and its intellectual property, with the IDG serving to help handle execution of the event. In a 1997 interview, IDSA president Doug Lowenstein said E3 was also the primary source of income for the IDSA. In 2016, revenues from running E3 accounted for about 48% of the organization's annual budget, with another 37% coming from membership dues. Some member companies criticized the ESA for its split focus between producing E3 and acting as a legislative advocacy group, with neither focus receiving adequate attention. Following the high profile withdrawals of companies like Sony and Electronic Arts from attending E3, the direction of E3 was called into question, with some members advocating for the business of running E3 to be split out into a separate company. The ESA ultimately discontinued E3 permanently in December 2023.

The ESA leads in confronting legislation that would be harmful to the video game industry, particularly related to video game rating controversies under the ESRB, and encouraging legislation that would be beneficial to the industry. Of note, the ESA was one plaintiff in Brown v. Entertainment Merchants Association, a Supreme Court case that judged that video games were protected works under the First Amendment in 2012, and helped get entertainment software included in the Information Technology Agreement of 1996.

The ESA also engages in government lobbying at the state and federal level. According to a Bloomberg report, the ESA spent approximately $1.1 million in the first quarter of 2011 on lobbying efforts in Washington D.C. The ESA has initially been a proponent of the proposed anti-piracy SOPA and PIPA legislation, Red 5 Studios CEO Mark Kern founded the League For Gamers (LFG), a rival trade organization, in response. In January 2012, the ESA dropped its support for both SOPA and PIPA, while calling on Congress to craft a more balanced copyright approach.

Gregory Boyd, chairman of the Interactive Entertainment Group at the New York law firm stated, "When it comes to lobbying, the 'main industry group' that individual companies defer to is the Entertainment Software Association (ESA), which spent $4.83 million on its own in 2012 — more than Facebook, Google, or even the National Rifle Association (NRA)."

The ESA also works to combat and reduce copyright infringement of video game-related works for the companies it represents. This is typically done through sending takedown or cease and desist notices to sites hosting infringing work, and working with search engines like Google to delist sites that host infringing files. They also work with law enforcement agencies to train agents how to handle copyright infringement.

ESA has spoken in favor of the loot box mechanics, arguing that it does not constitute gambling.

The ESA launched their Accessible Games Initiative in March 2025 in partnership with EA, Google, Microsoft, Nintendo of America, and Ubisoft, addressing video game accessibility. The Initiative developed 24 tags with the intention for these to be included on software box covers or included on digital storefronts to describe games' features towards accessibility, such as narrated menus or joystick inversion options.

In February 2025, ESA announced the Interactive Innovation Conference (IICON), a spiritual successor to E3, though closed to the public and aimed at connecting video game publishers with other entertainment industry venues. The first edition was held at the Fontainebleau Las Vegas in April 2026.

== Criticism and controversies ==
The association's support for SOPA/PIPA was protested by Mark Kern's rival trade association League for Gamers, and through boycotts of the E3 convention.

In May 2019, Variety reported that then-ESA President and CEO Mike Gallagher had lost the confidence of the organization's board of directors following concerns about his leadership. According to the report, Gallagher was accused by current and former employees of fostering a toxic workplace culture, including pitting employees against one another, sending belittling messages, and dismissing an experienced executive in favor of a preferred hire. The article also reported that Gallagher's efforts to align the ESA more closely with the administration of President Donald Trump, including public support for the 2017 Tax Cuts and Jobs Act, had generated dissatisfaction among several ESA member companies. Variety further reported that the board, led by chair Robert A. Altman and vice chair Phil Spencer, initiated an internal investigation into Gallagher's conduct. Gallagher was fired as ESA president in October 2018, and interim president Stanley Pierre-Louis was later appointed as his permanent successor.

On August 3, 2019, it had been found that an unsecured list of personal attendee data was publicly accessible from the ESA's site. The list contained the information of over 2,000 people, most of them being the press and social media influencers that had attended E3 2019. ESA removed the list afterwards, and apologized for allowing the information to become public. Later, through techniques similar to those used in the 2019 incident, users found similar data for over 6,000 attendees of past E3 events that were still available on user-authenticated portions of their website; these too were pulled by ESA once they were notified.

The ESA was noted for lobbying against video game preservation efforts. This included opposition to Stop Killing Games, a movement started by Ross Scott in 2024 to mandate leaving online-only video games in a reasonably functional state after discontinuation. In May 2026, Stop Killing Games organizer Moritz Katzner accused the ESA of spreading falsehoods about the movement's aims.

At a hearing on the California AB 1921 / Protect Our Games Act in June 2026, ESA vice-president Jennifer Gibbons stated that Minecraft and Call of Duty private community servers "[a]re illegal", and when questioned by committee members, she further stated that the ESA considers it piracy, referencing pending lawsuits and USTR "notorious markets" reports. The statement was criticized online, with news outlets pointing out that Mojang Studios, the developer of Minecraft, explicitly provides software and documentation for running private servers on their official website. When prompted with criticism, the ESA doubled down, stating that "private servers infringe on the intellectual property rights of game publishers."
