= West Coast Customs =

Automobile repair shop focusing on the customization of vehicles

- Type: Private company
- Founded: 1994 (LA Times), 1997 (USA Today), 2000 (incorporation)
- Founder: Ryan Friedlinghaus
- Headquarters: Burbank, California, U.S. (Note: The company was previously headquartered in several other locations in southern California, namely the cities of Corona, El Segundo, Inglewood, Compton and Laguna Niguel.)
- Key people: Quinton Dodson, Chris G. Cooley, Dana Florence
- Products: Custom cars, branded merchandise, franchising, trade school courses
- Revenue: $10 million (2008)
- Number of employees: 40 (2015)
- Website: www.westcoastcustoms.com

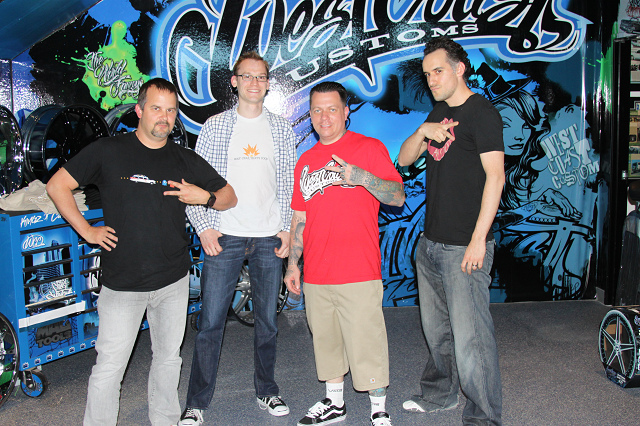
CEO of West Coast Customs Ryan Friedlinghaus, in red, poses with three Microsoft employees. Friedlinghaus makes a "W" hand sign as in the opening sequence of Inside West Coast Customs, while the Microsoft employees make V signs.

West Coast Customs (abbreviated by the company as WCC) is an automobile repair shop focusing on the customization of vehicles. It was started by co-founders Ryan Friedlinghaus and Quinton Dodson circa 1994. According to Friedlinghaus, he began the business with a $5,000 loan from his grandfather, but other sources claim that he raised the seed money for the business while working at his father's liquor store. Owing to the patronage of celebrities such as Shaquille O'Neal and Sean Combs, along with appearances in the reality television programs Pimp My Ride and Street Customs, the company has gained a high degree of notoriety and has become a multimillion-dollar business.

Besides celebrities, West Coast Customs has also created vehicles for global brands such as Virgin, Nintendo, and Microsoft. It is frequently characterized as one of the best custom car shops in the United States. However, the company has also at times been accused of missing deadlines, using aggressive sales tactics, and producing low quality and potentially unsafe customized vehicles. Some observers and past employees have also criticized the company's employment practices.

It has had some success franchising outside of the United States; it has opened franchises in Dubai, and Shanghai (as Chinese: 西海岸汽车定制). Other franchises, however, such as the one in Berlin, closed shortly after opening due to becoming insolvent. With a long history of different locations within the U.S. state of California, its current flagship and largest facility of 60,000 square feet (5,600 m^{2}) is headquartered in Burbank, California.

== History ==
=== Early years; Pimp My Ride (1990–2007) ===
According to two contradictory statements in the Los Angeles Times, West Coast Customs was founded in either 1994 or 1998 by auto enthusiast Ryan Friedlinghaus. In a 2008 article, USA Today put the foundation year as 1997. The legal entity, West Coast Customs International, LLC, was incorporated in California on October 20, 2000. A young Friedlinghaus had gotten his custom vehicles featured on the covers of auto magazines by age 14, but he became frustrated with the tedium of dealing with multiple specialty shops, which led to longer times to build the vehicles. According to Entrepreneur, this frustration, coupled with his love for custom cars, was what led to his opening of his own shop.

The company moved many times in its early years, but it was at its Inglewood location that WCC began to gain a reputation for quality, which caused celebrities to have their cars modified there. According to Friedlinghaus, one of his first customers was Shaquille O'Neal, who wanted a customized Chevrolet Suburban, and this relationship helped him get contacts with other celebrities who were looking for custom automobiles. Owing to this, Music Television (MTV) offered Friedlinghaus the opportunity to have a reality television show filmed at his business with co-founder Quinton "Q" Dodson as the star and rapper Xzibit as the host; his acceptance of this deal led to the 2004 TV show Pimp My Ride.

Pimp My Ride was extremely successful, spawning international spin-offs, and its success increased the profile of West Coast Customs substantially. The show's format was that the Film producer at MTV would find typical Americans with junk cars, they would be given a short interview with Xzibit, Friedlinghaus and the WCC crew to determine their interests and hobbies, and then WCC staff would take their junk car and transform it into a custom car embodying the interests and personality of its owner. In 2004, CBS News reported that the show consistently ranked first place in the 12 to 34-year-old demographic for its 9:30 pm time slot.

According to a former employee of the company at the time Pimp My Ride was filmed, most of the work on the vehicles was done behind the scenes. Cars and expectations for the final product would arrive on Monday, and employees had until the following Friday to complete a project, sometimes necessitating twelve hour work days. According to this employee, much of the off-screen labor was done by illegal immigrants from Mexico, around eleven in total. As the employees were of WCC and not MTV, MTV was apparently unconcerned about possible ramifications of this for them.

Owing to the popularity of Pimp My Ride, West Coast Customs was prominently featured in the 2005 street racing video game L.A. Rush as the car upgrade mechanism. According to the Chicago Tribune, Midway, the developer of the game, paid "handsomely" to be able to use the brand.

In June 2005, Friedlinghaus took over the role of host from Dodson for the fourth season.

As early as 2005, during airing of the second season of Pimp My Ride, rumors circulated that the location of the show would change and Friedlinghaus would part with MTV to host a show on a different network. These rumors were confirmed with simultaneous announcements by MTV and Friedlinghaus in 2007, after the fourth and final season with WCC as the shop.

In a 2007 interview in the Los Angeles Times that Friedlinghaus gave after the Pimp My Ride relocation from West Coast Customs to Galpin Auto Sports, Friedlinghaus credited Pimp My Ride with helping him build his brand, but said that he felt that his focus on building cars for the television show damaged his relationships with his other customers.

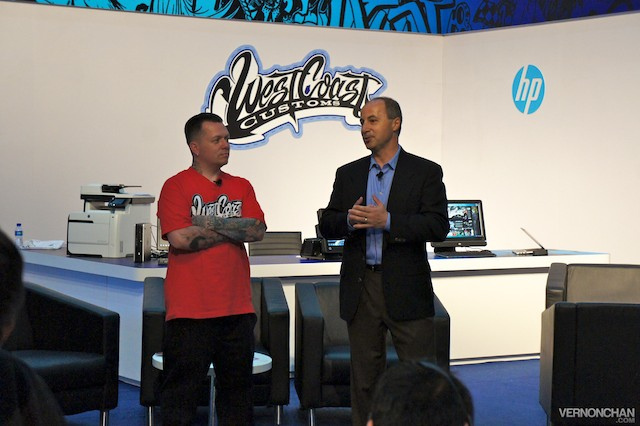
Friedlinghaus speaks with Hewlett-Packard, a client of his, at HP's Global Influencer Summit in 2012 in Shanghai, China.

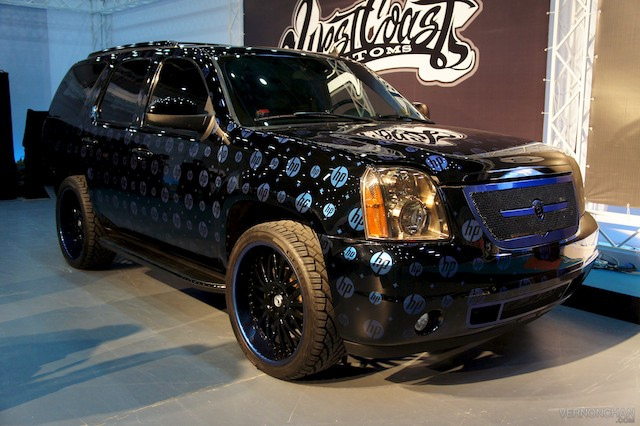
Exterior of GMC Denali West Coast Customs prepared for HP for the 2012 summit

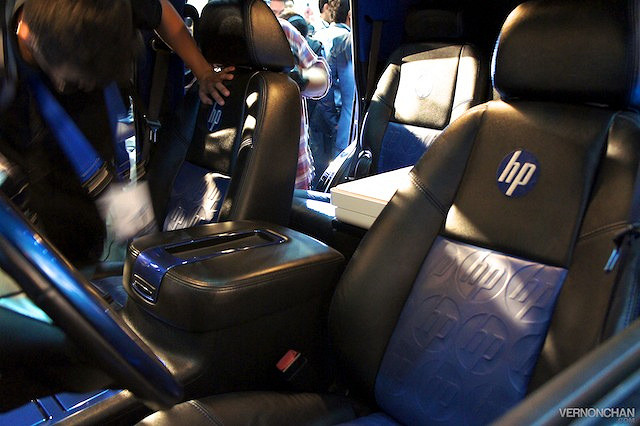
Interior of vehicle West Coast Customs prepared for HP for the 2012 summit

=== Street Customs and (Inside) West Coast Customs (2007–2018) ===
Nevertheless, after leaving Pimp My Ride, Friedlinghaus would almost immediately begin a new television program that aired simultaneously on Discovery Channel and The Learning Channel, Street Customs, produced by Pilgrim Films & Television. Instead of building the cars for the people chosen by MTV, the new show followed ongoing customizations being done for consenting customers of West Coast Customs. Friedlinghaus described the difference between the two shows thus: "I want to build cars on TV, not for TV." While the breakup was described as amicable, others at WCC were not so subdued: Sean Mahaney, a then-employee of WCC, reportedly said "Most of the MTV people are not real car guys... They pay us to build the cars, so we do what they want even if it sucks."

Street Customs would change names twice and networks four times, but its format remained constant. While cars would still be built for individuals, more and more episodes were devoted to brands as the show ran on. Because MTV was no longer footing the bill, all episodes of the new series were about cars built for people who could afford the high cost of customization. Some notable vehicles built for celebrities in Street Customs include one for Carroll Shelby, a Cadillac for Shaquille O'Neal (according to Friedlinghaus, O'Neal had already had 30 cars built for him by WCC by July 2007), a modified Range Rover for an unnamed member of the royal family of Dubai, and a Cadillac CTS-V for Justin Bieber. Brands built for included Chronic Tacos and Vans.

According to Friedlinghaus, in an interview with The Press-Enterprise, the Great Recession affected his business heavily: he had to lay off half of the company's employees, orders decreased, and customers opted to have used cars repaired instead of buying brand new cars to be customized.

In 2010, West Coast Customs designed three identical customized 1955 Ford F-100 pick up trucks that were prominently featured in the film The Expendables. One of these cars was for Sylvester Stallone, who sold it at auction in 2011 for $132,000. In 2015, WCC created a car by combining the body of a Ford Maverick and the internals of a Ford Ranger for another film, Mad Max: Fury Road.

After the 2009 season, the show was renamed Inside West Coast Customs. Along with this change, it was also moved to Discovery HD Theater, which later became a different specifically automotive related cable channel, Velocity.

In 2012, Jalopnik reported that the rapper will.i.am and Friedlinghaus organized a publicity stunt wherein will.i.am pretended that his car, a DeLorean modified by West Coast Customs at a cost of $700,000, was stolen. Friedlinghaus then pretended to find the supposedly stolen car. No police report was filed, nor were the police even called; Jalopnik describes the event as a "viral marketing stunt gone badly".

In June 2013, Fox Sports Network took over the production of the show, dropping the word "Inside" from the show's name, and continued to produce new seasons of the show until 2016. In March 2017, the television show moved back to Velocity with a new season; Velocity then renewed the show in January 2018.

Timeline of Street Customs seasons
Seasons	Network	Notes
2007, 2009	Discovery Channel and The Learning Channel	Street Customs
2010–2012	Discovery HD Theater	Show renamed to Inside West Coast Customs
2013–2016	Fox Sports Network	"Inside" dropped from name
2017–2018	Velocity	"Inside" restored to name

On August 29, 2018, it was announced Six Flags Magic Mountain was in the process of constructing a roller coaster named West Coast Racers, which was designed in part by West Coast Customs.

== Location changes ==
The company has moved several times in its history, across 3 different counties in the Los Angeles metropolitan area, each time to larger spaces. According to Friedlinghaus, the first shop was in Laguna Niguel, California, after which it moved to Compton, California, in 1998. In 2000, it moved again to a location on Olive Street in Inglewood, California. After the first season of Pimp My Ride, the company moved yet another time to a larger location in El Segundo, California, near Los Angeles International Airport that had a room specifically for the filming. After Pimp My Ride left the company, it moved to a location in Corona, California, in preparation for the Street Customs television show.

During filming of Season 5 Episode 12 "WCC's New Zip Part 1" of West Coast Customs, Friedlinghaus began moving the shop to its current location, a 60,000 square feet (5,600 m^{2}) auto shop on West Empire Avenue in Burbank, Los Angeles County, California. The grand opening of the new facility occurred in December 2014.

== Criticism ==
=== Mistreatment of employees ===
As early as 2008, USA Today noted that Friedlinghaus's auto shop routinely had 60-hour work weeks and employees had "insane deadlines" working for Friedlinghaus, a "self-described micromanager". One former employee, Mauricio Hernández, who would go on to co-found the Mexican franchise of WCC, claimed in an interview with NPR that during the period of his employment at the California branch (2004–2009), he worked ten to twelve hours per day, six days per week as an undocumented worker, without Social Security or any other benefits, and that by so doing he "missed...the childhood of [his] kids."

In an interview with Entertainment Scoop, when asked "What does it take to be an employee at West Coast Customs?" Friedlinghaus replied, "Not saying, 'when do I go home?' The guys who want to stay and work and get things done...it's hard to find people that are good...[people who will do] whatever we ask them to do."

On April 23, 2014, after an investigation by the United States Department of Labor (USDOL), the company was found to have violated the provisions of the Fair Labor Standards Act. The government found that the company was not paying employees overtime or minimum wage nor keeping proper records. During the investigation, the government found that all employees were paid a weekly salary, regardless of how many hours they worked. Because employees were frequently coerced to work overtime, this resulted in a wage of $6/hour for some employees. Furthermore, until 2011, the company attempted to skirt minimum wage and overtime laws by classifying their on-site exclusive long-term employees as independent contractors, which is illegal in the United States.

When presented with the opportunity to go to court or pay the fine assessed by USDOL, Friedlinghaus chose to pay the fine, which amounted to $157,592 in back wages for the wronged employees and $16,830 in civil penalties. In an interview with The Press-Enterprise after the fine was paid, Daniel Pasquil, the director for the wages and hour division of the West Covina office of the USDOL, noted that "the most important thing is that the company did correct the violations" and stressed that the company is now in full compliance.

=== Quality issues alleged ===
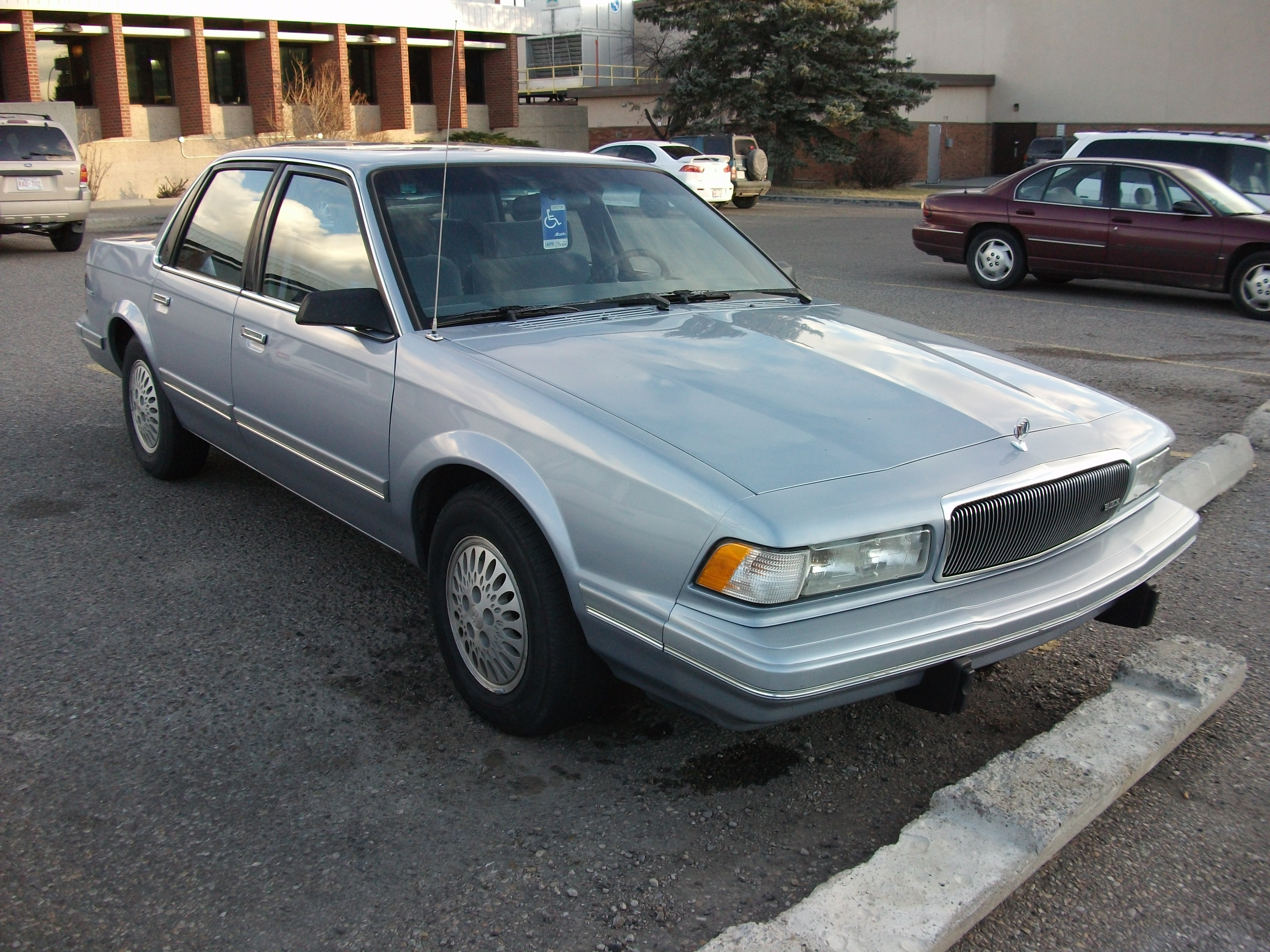
A Buick Century, the same model and color of which were "pimped" on the MTV show

==== Jake Glazier's Buick Century ====
In 2015, The Huffington Post interviewed three people who were participants on Pimp My Ride, one of whom had a vehicle that was "pimped" during the time that the location of the show was West Coast Customs, Jake Glazier (featured in Season 4 Episode 7, "Jake's Buick Century").

During the episode, the team at West Coast Customs were told that Glazier had recently graduated from a degree program in audio engineering, so they installed an MTX Jackhammer high fidelity sound system (with accompanying decibel meter and warning light, in the words of Xzibit, to stave off deafness) and a record player inside the dashboard. Other customizations were a flat black paint job (with a red metal flake paint job on the roof with scallops on the sides and hood to match), four-inch whitewall tires, removal of the muffler and installation of exhaust pipes, and black and white vinyl interior.

Besides problems caused by the long period of time that the vehicle was in the shop, for around one half of a year, Glazier claimed that the quality of the vehicle he received was also severely compromised. According to Glazier, when the muffler was removed, three "fake" exhaust pipes were substituted instead: these were used to make the engine sound much more powerful to viewers of the television show, but they made the car needlessly loud. He also claimed that very little or no mechanical work was done to the car, to the extent that he had trouble driving it home from the show's set. Due to all of the mechanical trouble, one month after acquiring the car from West Coast Customs, he sold it to MTX Audio for $18,000. According to Glazier, MTX did not buy the car to drive it, but merely to prevent it from falling into the hands of their competitors. Glazier further claimed that when it was time to receive the car, Dana "Big Dane" Florence intimidated him to act more enthusiastic for the cameras, saying "Listen, we put a lot of work into this. We expect you to be a little more fucking enthusiastic." Larry Hochberg, an executive producer for MTV at the time, disputed Glazier's statements, saying that in reality great lengths were taken to provide the participants in the show with automobiles in good driving condition, and that MTV even paid for some further repairs and tows after the cameras were rolling.

Despite the problems he faced with the vehicle, and with the caveat that he appear on a show with the same format as Pimp My Ride where MTV paid for all work done until the car was delivered (and for some afterwards, depending on who one believes), Glazier said he would happily participate in the program again if given the chance.

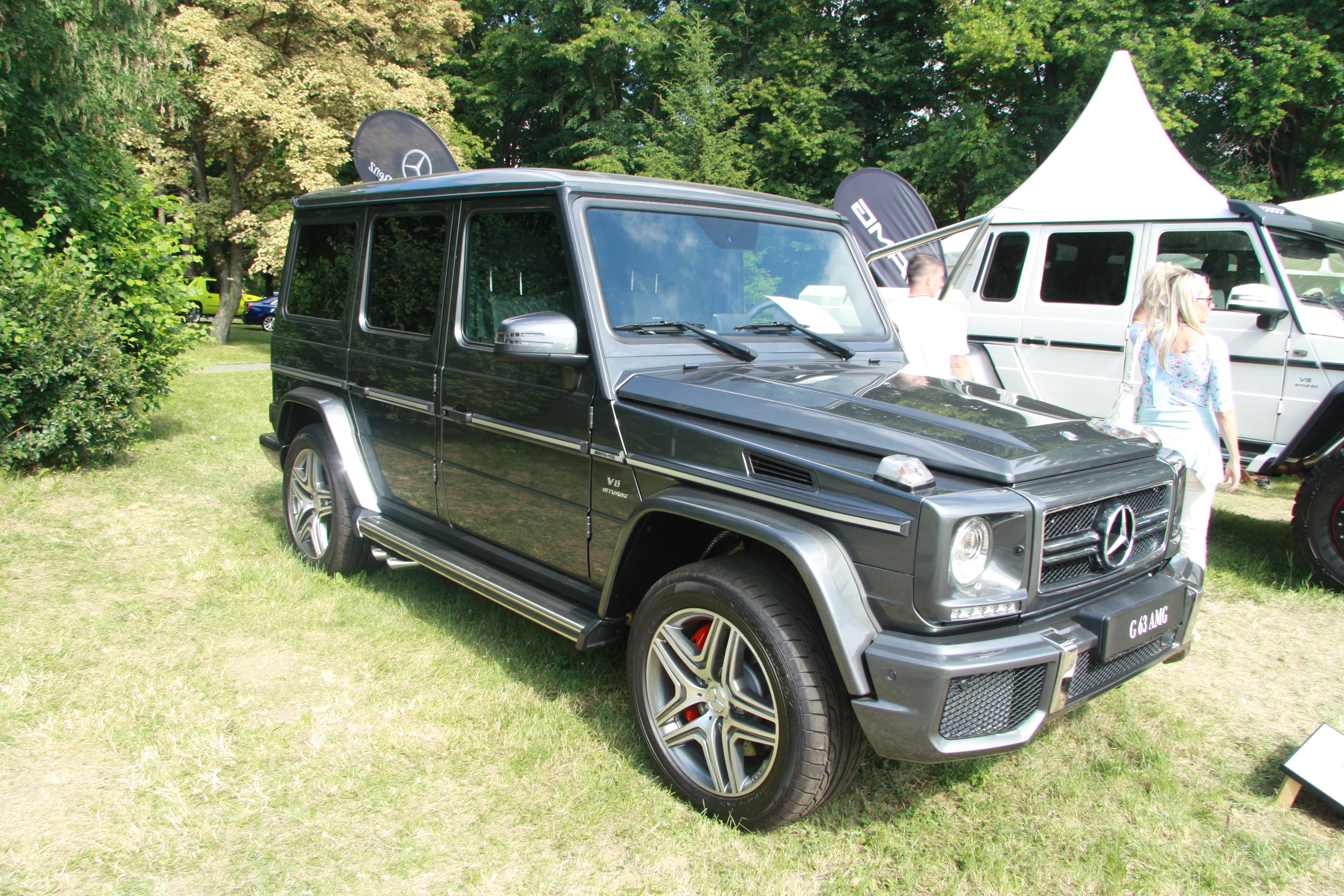
Mercedes-Benz G-Wagen of the same model and year to the one modified on behalf of Paytas

==== Trisha Paytas' Mercedes-Benz G-Wagen ====
There have been several high-profile incidents of quality issues outside of the context of the MTV program. In 2015, Trisha Paytas, a singer-songwriter and internet personality, had her three-week-old 2014 Mercedes-Benz G-Wagen customized by WCC. Among other customizations, she requested that the car be painted pink, that Swarovski crystals be integrated into the headrests and steering wheel, and that the floormats be changed out with customized ones. According to Paytas, after bringing in her vehicle, she was promised that it would be ready by November 17, but the company missed both that deadline and a further one on December 9. After the second deadline was missed, she uploaded a vlog to YouTube about her experience, and thereafter claimed that WCC threatened her with a lawsuit if she refused to remove it. December 17 became the deadline that the company would ultimately keep, but when Paytas came to pick up the vehicle, she found that none of the electronic components worked, including those that are required for safety in the United States, such as turn signals, headlights, and windshield wipers. Furthermore, the dashboard instruments did not function. To her complaints about these issues, Paytas claims that the company told her to drive the car home and then to the Mercedes-Benz dealership from which she bought it to ask them for an in-warranty repair. Paytas uploaded yet another vlog five days after this incident, after which point WCC uploaded its own video in the form of a scrolling text public relations statement. In the statement, besides denying that they had "talked down" to Paytas, WCC denied that its customization was the reason for the issues with her vehicle, claimed that the vehicle was late because she had changed what she had ordered "several times", denied that they had ignored Paytas as Paytas claimed, and invited Paytas to contact them with any further requests or complaints for an "immediate resolution," noting that they had already committed to fix the problem (which, though they wrote it was "unrelated to their services", they would do it anyway "as part of providing excellent customer service"). The company also noted its track record, but did not provide any concrete details. As of December 23, 2016, the statement-as-YouTube video, which has had its comments disabled, had 261 "likes" and 1,652 "dislikes", or a ratio of 6.32 dislikes for every 1 like.

After receiving the repaired vehicle, Paytas wrote on Instagram that although "it was a bit of a struggle getting [it] [...] I do love my [car] so very very much."

==== Firefall bus for Red 5 Studios ====
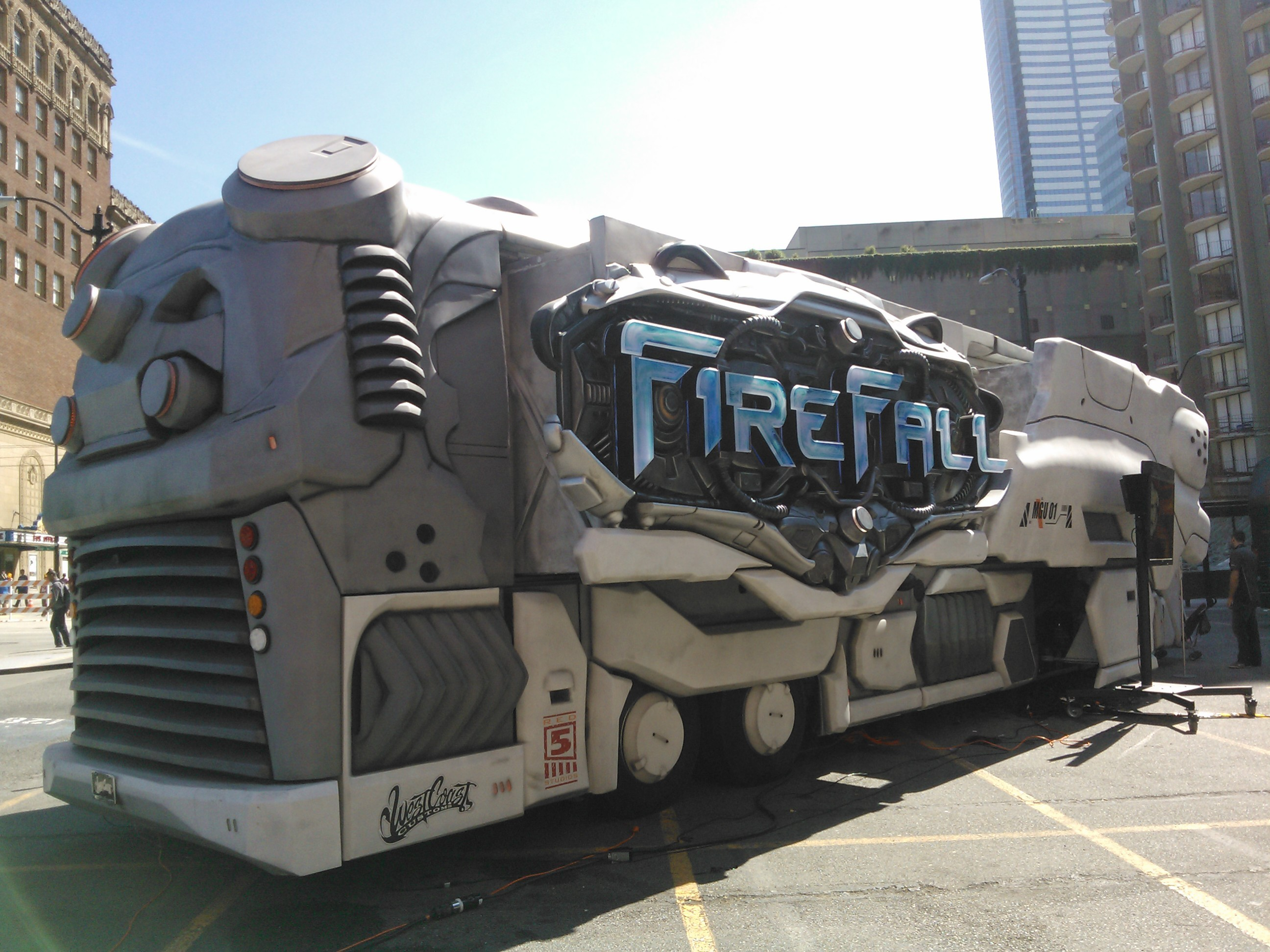
The Firefall promotional bus makes its debut appearance at Anime Expo 2012.

In 2010, Chinese online game operator The9 Limited announced Firefall, an MMO first-person shooter to be developed by Red 5 Studios as their first game. The game would enter closed beta in 2011, and open beta in 2013. Mark Kern, a video game designer, was appointed by The9 as CEO of the new Red 5 Studios. As CEO, one of Kern's major tasks was promoting the game, and he chose to do this in part with a custom designed tour bus worth US$3 million made to look like one of the vehicles in the videogame and to be converted into a game room on wheels. The customization of the bus was featured on Inside West Coast Customs in Season 3 Episode 4. While in the episode itself it is made to appear that the bus was on-time, arriving at the Los Angeles 2012 Anime Expo which took place between June 29 and July 2, in reality it arrived much later than anticipated, according to both then-CEO Mark Kern and a report by Tech in Asia. Kern also accused WCC of not delivering what he wanted and of going over budget, while Tech in Asia noted that the bus was delivered missing some of its key features, and that it missed all of the key video game conferences for the year 2011 (such as the Electronic Entertainment Expo 2012, which was held between June 5 and 7). According to their report, it now "sits in a warehouse somewhere, collecting dust." A Twitter parody of the bus describes itself as a "gross demonstration of capitalistic overindulgence."

== Franchises ==
West Coast Customs has attempted to franchise its brand to other parts of the world with limited success.

=== Closed franchises ===
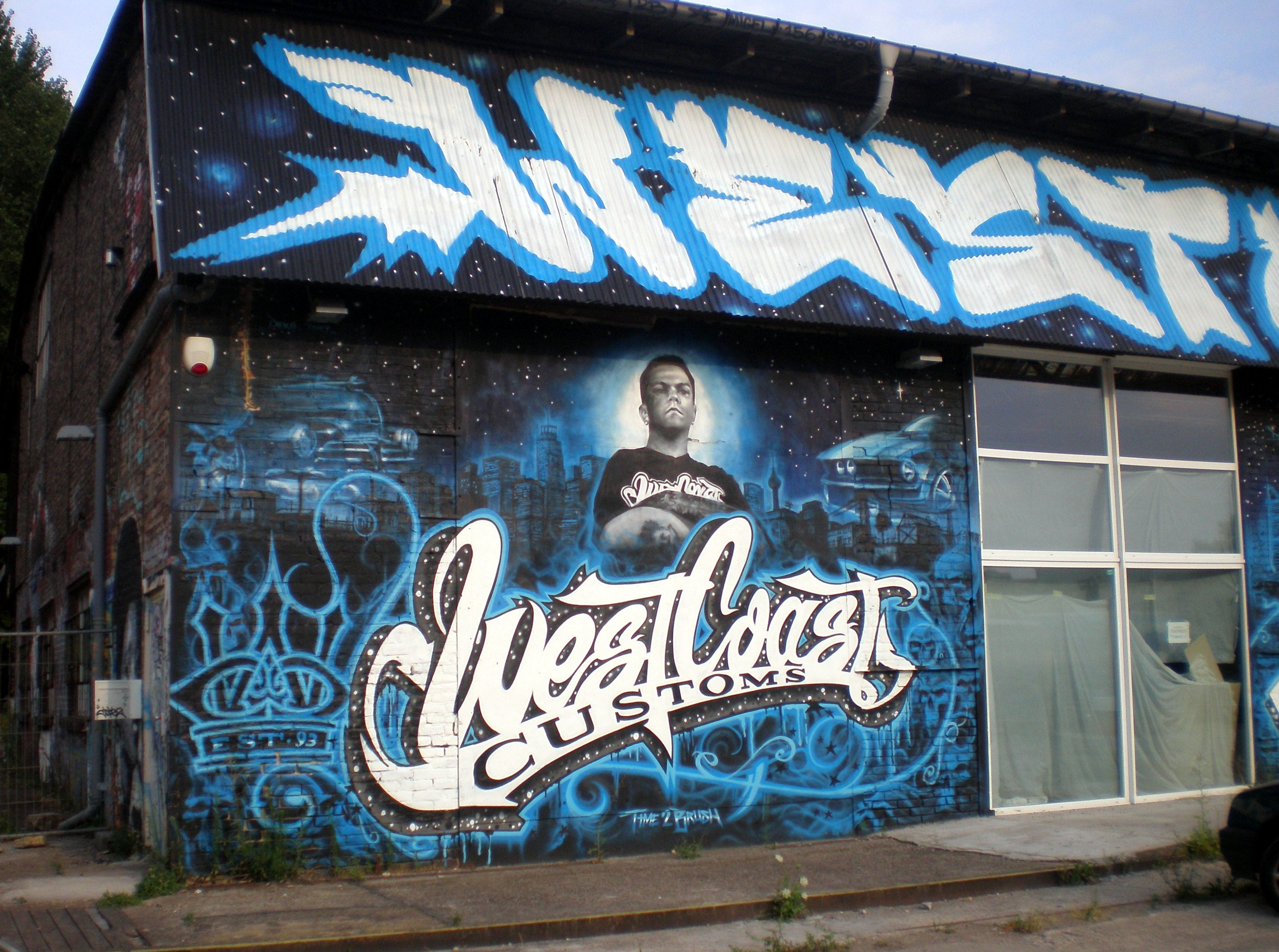
Facade of the Berlin franchise shortly after its closure

- On September 14, 2008, a franchise was opened in a converted factory building along Revaler Straße in Friedrichshain, Berlin, but it closed and declared insolvency less than one year later on August 14, 2009. Before its closure, professional boxer Wladimir Klitschko and musician "Evil" Jared Hasselhoff were customers. In 2011, following the closure of the business, the building was repainted.
- Mauricio Hernández, a former employee at the California location hired just before the debut on Pimp My Ride, co-founded a Mexican franchise with Friedlinghaus' blessing in 2009. A television show with a similar format to the American version called Tunéame la nave was first broadcast on August 14, 2009, by Azteca shortly after the opening of the new business. According to Hernández, who became the host of the show, the franchise was opened with a "high" fee paid to Friedlinghaus to use the brand. The show continued for six seasons on Azteca, but it is unclear if there will be a 2017 season and where it will air. This is because on May 24, 2016, during airing of season six, Hernández announced that he was abandoning the "West Coast Customs" brand and company in favor of his own brand, PacifiCoast Customs. In an interview with TuningMex, Hernández stated that the new company had hired 20 employees, had an initial investment of MXN 2.5 million (US$133,947), and would be based in Culiacán, Sinaloa, Mexico, describing the name change as similar to cutting "an umbilical cord." In a separate interview, Hernández stated that when people in Mexico think of West Coast Customs, they think of him and not Ryan Friedlinghaus, thus hinting that he does not believe that the change in name will hurt business. Hernández stated that the new company is projected to work on only twenty cars in its first year, thus guaranteeing quality and that employees will not be overworked.

=== Never opened franchises ===
- A Japanese franchise is mentioned on the official WCC website, and a website announcing that it was "coming soon!" became available in 2009, and was online until March 13, 2012, but by April 13, 2012, the server hosting the site began returning a 403 error, and after November 7, 2012, the server hosting the website of the Japanese franchise went offline. In a 2013 video released by HP interviewing Friedlinghaus, the Japanese franchise's logo was displayed as (Japanese: ウエスト・コースト・カスタムズ), despite the fact that no such company existed at the time. An address was never provided, no Japanese media wrote about the opening of the franchise, and no further information about it has been forthcoming from WCC, so it can be assumed that the Japanese franchise never opened.
- In 2010, Dana Florence traveled to St. Petersburg, for a question-and-answer session at the "Active Open Air Show Cars [sic]", according to The Village. A Russian franchise under the name Russian: Вест Коуст Customs is likewise mentioned by the company, but as of January 2017, as in the case of the Japanese franchise, there is no sign of its opening.
- A Malaysian franchise is also mentioned in the 2013 HP video as Malay: Pantai Barat Customs. The owner of the franchise claimed that he would bring "official WCC merchandise to Malaysian shores" in 2013, but has made no further posts as of December 2016.

=== Open franchises ===
Despite these setbacks, some franchisees have created successful businesses.

- In 2007, Friedlinghaus announced a Dubai franchise to be owned by Al Ghussein Global Investments, which continues to operate as of December 2016. The Dubai franchise was opened with a fee of AED 18 million (US$4.9 million) paid to West Coast Customs to use its trademark.
- On January 14, 2016, Friedlinghaus announced a further Shanghai franchise via a Facebook post. When the franchise opened on August 18, 2016, the event was met with substantial positive coverage by Chinese media, with articles appearing in the Qilu Evening News, auto magazine Autohome, and the website of Chinese television station Phoenix InfoNews Channel. The franchise is located at No. 218 Huajiang Road in Shanghai's Jiading District.
