= World of Warcraft: Forever =

2026 video game

World of Warcraft Forever
- Developer: Blizzard Entertainment
- Publisher: Blizzard Entertainment
- Composers: Adam Burgess; Brendon Williams; David Arkenstone; Neal Acree; Jason Hayes
- Series: Warcraft
- Platforms: Windows; macOS
- Release: November 4, 2026
- Genre: MMORPG
- Mode: Multiplayer

World of Warcraft: Forever is a massively multiplayer online role-playing game (MMORPG) developed and published by Blizzard Entertainment. It is an alternate version of World of Warcraft designed around the game's original 2004 setting and gameplay, while introducing new content and storylines not present in the original game. Blizzard has described it as a new branch of World of Warcraft that will operate alongside the modern version of the game and World of Warcraft: Classic.

Forever is chronologically set during the first year of World of Warcraft, taking place within a separate continuity from the modern version of the game. Unlike Classic, which recreates the original game as it was, Forever expands upon the original version of Azeroth by adding new zones, quests, dungeons, raids, races, abilities, and race-class combinations, while retaining the level cap at 60. The game is intended to explore areas and stories that were not developed during the original progression of World of Warcraft.

Blizzard announced World of Warcraft: Forever at BlizzCon 2026 on September 12, 2026. The beta version began on September 17, 2026, and the full game released on November 4, 2026. Access to Forever is included with an existing World of Warcraft subscription or game time, while optional digital upgrade packs provide additional content and cosmetic items.

World of Warcraft: Forever achieved the largest launch in World of Warcraft history by peak concurrent player count, alongside the highest number of returning players in the game's history. The game reached 1 million concurrent players in China.

== Gameplay ==
World of Warcraft: Forever uses the original version of Azeroth as its foundation but expands the world with new content. The game retains a level cap of 60 rather than progressing to higher levels through conventional expansions. Blizzard has said that progression will instead focus on new activities, stories, abilities, equipment, and other systems while keeping players within the original level range.

The game adds three new zones and substantially expands or changes several existing areas of the original world. Blizzard also plans to add more than 1,000 quests, nine dungeons, and two raids. The additional content is intended to cover parts of Azeroth that were left undeveloped in the original game and stories that take place alongside the events of the original World of Warcraft storyline.

A new playable race, the Skyborne Elves, is introduced in Forever. The game also features additional race and class combinations that were unavailable in the original version of World of Warcraft, including Forsaken Paladins and Dwarf Shamans.

Community and Cooperation

One of the design choices in World of Warcraft: Forever is the return of gameplay mechanics that encourage players to interact and cooperate. Unlike modern World of Warcraft, where multiple players can receive credit for attacking the same enemy without being grouped together, Forever retains the original enemy-tagging system. This means that players must form groups if they want to share credit for defeating enemies during quests. Blizzard senior game designer Josh Greenfield explained that keeping this mechanic was intentional because it encourages social interaction. The system reflects the cooperative gameplay found in earlier versions of World of Warcraft, where forming groups was a common part of completing quests.

Exploration and Progression

World of Warcraft: Forever brings back the slower travel and exploration style found in the original game. Unlike newer versions of World of Warcraft, Forever does not allow flying mounts, which were first introduced in The Burning Crusade expansion. Instead, players must explore Azeroth on foot or use ground-based transportation. Blizzard's developers explained that this choice was made to encourage players to experience the world around them rather than skip over large areas. Associate production director Clay Stone stated that the team wanted to maintain some of the challenges that made the original game unique, such as longer travel times and the need to work with other players. By keeping these mechanics, Forever places greater emphasis on exploration, cooperation, and the overall experience of traveling through Azeroth.

== Development ==
Blizzard began seriously pursuing the concept behind World of Warcraft: Forever in the first half of the 2020s. According to Blizzard developers, members of the development team had discussed creating a new version of the original game as early as 2020. The team's work on World of Warcraft Classic and experiments such as World of Warcraft: Season of Discovery helped inform the development of the project. Blizzard decided to pursue the concept as a full project around 2024.

The project was initially associated with rumors of a "Classic Plus" version of World of Warcraft. Blizzard later confirmed the project under the name World of Warcraft: Forever at BlizzCon 2026. Executive producer Holly Longdale described the game as a new beginning for World of Warcraft that would preserve the original game's setting while allowing Blizzard to tell new stories within it.

Rather than replacing either the modern version of World of Warcraft or World of Warcraft Classic, Forever is designed to exist alongside both games. Blizzard has described the project as a permanent version of the game focused on expanding the original Azeroth rather than progressing through the same expansion timeline as the main game.

== Reception ==
Reception

Aggregate score
Aggregator	Score
Metacritic	84/100

World of Warcraft: Forever received generally favorable reviews from critics, according to the review aggregation website Metacritic.
