= Michael Gallagher (political advisor) =

American businessman and political advisor

Michael D. Gallagher
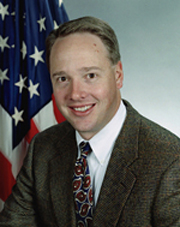
- Michael Gallagher in 2004

Assistant Secretary of Commerce for Communications and Information
- In office 2004 – 2006; Acting: 2003-2004
- President: George W. Bush
- Secretary: Donald Evans; Carlos Gutierrez
- Preceded by: Nancy J. Victory
- Succeeded by: John M. R. Kneuer

Deputy Assistant Secretary of Commerce for Communications and Information
- In office August 14, 2003 – 2004
- President: George W. Bush
- Secretary: Donald Evans; Nancy J. Victory (Asst. Secretary)
- In office November 2, 2001 – May 26, 2003
- President: George W. Bush
- Secretary: Donald Evans

Personal details
- Born: January 23, 1964 (age 62) Arcadia, California, U.S.
- Party: Republican
- Children: 3
- Education: University of California, Berkeley; UCLA School of Law
- Occupation: Business executive

Michael D. Gallagher (born January 23, 1964) is an American businessman and political advisor. He held positions in the George W. Bush White House, including in the United States Department of Commerce. He was the president and CEO of the Entertainment Software Association, the trade association representing the computer and video game industry from 2007 until 2018. He is now the CEO of the Washington Policy Center.

== Career ==
Gallagher received his B.A. from the University of California, Berkeley and his J.D. from the University of California, Los Angeles.

Gallagher served as administrative assistant to Washington Congressman Rick White and co-chaired the government relations practice group at the law firm of Perkins Coie.

He was managing director for government relations at AirTouch Communications, which was merged with Verizon Wireless. After the merger, he was vice president for state public policy at Verizon.

On November 2, 2001, Gallagher was appointed Deputy Assistant Secretary of Commerce for Communications & Information (NTIA) and on October 14, 2003, he was appointed Assistant Secretary for Commerce and Information via a recess appointment, bypassing Senate approval. He was later confirmed by the Senate on November 20, 2004 and left the Commerce Department in 2006.

On May 17, 2007, the Entertainment Software Association (ESA) named Gallagher as their 2nd president, replacing founder Doug Lowenstein. He stepped down in October 2018 following an internal investigation led by Robert Altman and Phil Spencer, then the chair and vice-chair of the ESA's board of directors, respectively. In 2019, Variety reported that Gallagher had lost the confidence of the board over a number of related issues in the preceding years. His office was characterized as a toxic work environment in which he pitted his subordinates against each other and sent them belittling messages. He also fired an experienced high-level employee in favor of a new employee he preferred. With the 2016 election of Donald Trump, Gallagher attempted to publicly align the ESA with Trump's policies, such as the Tax Cuts and Jobs Act of 2017, which was unpopular with members of the association. These issues eventually led to the investigation and his ouster.

Following his ouster, he founded a consulting firm for technology startups in 2019. In 2022, Gallagher took over as President & CEO of the Washington Policy Center, a conservative think tank in Washington state. He also serves as Chairman of the US Board of Advisors for NTT Docomo.

In March 2022, Gallagher took over as President & CEO of the Washington Policy Center, the leading free market think tank in Washington State.
