= World of Warcraft: Classic =

2019 video game

- Developer: Blizzard Entertainment
- Publisher: Blizzard Entertainment
- Series: Warcraft
- Platforms: Microsoft Windows, macOS
- Release: August 26, 2019
- Genre: MMORPG
- Mode: Multiplayer

World of Warcraft: Classic is a 2019 massively multiplayer online role-playing game developed and published by Blizzard Entertainment. Running alongside the main version of the game, Classic recreates World of Warcraft in the vanilla state it was in before the release of its first expansion, The Burning Crusade. It was announced at BlizzCon 2017 and was released globally August 26, 2019.

Various additional versions of Classic have since been released, including progression servers that have advanced sequentially through re-releases of the game’s first four expansions, seasonal servers featuring new or altered content distinct from the original game, a "20th Anniversary Edition" re-release of the original Classic and permadeath Hardcore servers.

== Gameplay ==
Classic recreates the game in the state it was in during patch 1.12.1, circa September 2006, before the launch of The Burning Crusade expansion. The maximum level of the player characters is set to 60, all expansion content is absent, and almost all the gameplay mechanics of the original version have been exactly replicated. As the game's multiple expansions have dramatically changed the gameplay over time, Classic allows players to relive the original experience, although some modern interface and functional enhancements introduced in later expansions have been integrated, as well as re-patching of bugs and exploits that were present at the original release of patch 1.12. A big part of this version of World of Warcraft is the social factor which many players felt was lacking from more recent iterations of the game.

Players can choose from the eight original races of World of Warcraft: humans, dwarves, gnomes, and night elves for the Alliance, and orcs, trolls, tauren, and the Forsaken for the Horde. The original nine classes are present: druid, hunter, mage, paladin, priest, rogue, shaman, warlock and warrior. As in the original version of the game, only Alliance players can become paladins, and only Horde players can become shamans. Races and classes added in the expansions are not available in the game. The game world is restored to its original, pre-Cataclysm state, and expansion areas such as Outland are not accessible.

To emulate the original game's patch release cycle, content in Classic was released in phases. This means that game content originally released in patches, such as the Blackwing Lair, Ahn'Qiraj, and Naxxramas raids; battlegrounds like Warsong Gulch and Alterac Valley; and certain items and quests; became available after launch according to a six-phase schedule. Unlike the content patches for the original game, these phases did not modify the core game mechanics such as character abilities in any way; the game balance has been set to the 1.12.1 version of the game since release.

== Development ==
Release timeline Expansion progressions in bold
2019	**World of Warcraft Classic**
2020
2021	**The Burning Crusade Classic**
2021	Season of Mastery
2022	**Wrath of the Lich King Classic**
2023	Season of Discovery
2023	Hardcore
2024	**Cataclysm Classic**
2024	20th Anniversary Edition
2025	**Mists of Pandaria Classic**
2026	The Burning Crusade Classic - Anniversary Edition

The option of Classic servers has been a long-standing request in the World of Warcraft community. Every expansion has removed or replaced old content and introduced controversial or unwanted mechanics, resulting in many players expressing a preference for older versions of the game. For example, the game's first expansion, The Burning Crusade, removed the original level-60 version of Kazzak, and in the process, all of the items that he dropped became forever unobtainable. The Burning Crusade also added flying mounts, which were criticized for their effect on world PvP; raised the level cap to 70, which was criticized for making all level 60 content obsolete; and opened the formerly faction-specific Paladin and Shaman classes to both factions. The second expansion, Wrath of the Lich King, removed the original versions of the Naxxramas and Onyxia raids and all items that could be obtained from them; added a Random Dungeon Finder tool, which many players felt spoiled the "social aspect" of the game; and made certain UI improvements that were criticized for reducing the need to read quest descriptions. Blizzard repeatedly refused to create legacy servers so that players could stay on older versions of the game. One of their oldest refusals was posted on February 21, 2008, by Drysc, who stated "We were at one time internally discussing the possibility fairly seriously, but the long term interest in continued play on them couldn't justify the extremely large amount of development and support resources it would take to implement and maintain them. We'd effectively be developing and supporting two different games."

Versions of World of Warcraft that existed prior to the launch of The Burning Crusade were often referred to as "vanilla" by players, but were referred to by Blizzard as "classic" at least as far back as November 29, 2009, when Vaneras wrote "We occasionally see requests for us to open pre-TBC realms, or classic realms if you prefer. Lately there have also been requests for pre-WotLK realms, and I am sure that once the next expansion pack is released there will be requests for pre-Cataclysm realms as well. We have answered these requests quite a few times now saying that we have no plans to open such realms, and this is still the case today. We have no plans to open classic realms or limited expansion content realms".

Demand for Classic and other legacy realms significantly increased when the Cataclysm expansion revamped the entire original game world, making the majority of the classic or "old world" content forever inaccessible. Blizzard's response at the time, as provided by Tom Chilton, was "Currently, my answer would be probably not. The reason I say that is because any massively multiplayer game that has pretty much ever existed and has ever done any expansions has always gotten the nostalgia of, 'Oh God, wouldn't it be great if we could have classic servers!' and more than anything else that generally proves to be nostalgia. In most cases - in almost all cases - the way it ends up playing out is that the game wasn't as good back then as people remember it being and then when those servers become available, they go play there for a little bit and quickly remember that it wasn't quite as good as what they remembered in their minds and they don't play there anymore and you set up all these servers and you dedicated all this hardware to it and it really doesn't get much use. So, for me, the historical lesson is that it's not a very good idea to do". When the issue was raised at a Q&A panel at BlizzCon 2013, J. Allen Brack famously responded "You think you do, but you don't", a phrase which would become the subject of ridicule years later.

Meanwhile, many private servers were being created by the community. Originally, private servers were mere novelties used for experimenting with alterations to the game rules, such as raising the level cap to 255. These early servers rarely had properly scripted raids, quests, or anything else. However, as expansions progressed and demand for legacy realms grew, private servers reversed focus and were seen as a way to faithfully re-create older versions of the game. Private servers emphasizing fidelity to the official versions of the game were referred to as "Blizzlike" and included Feenix, Molten Core, Emerald Dream, Nostalrius, and Light's Hope. The most popular was Nostalrius, which opened in February 2015 and had 800,000 registered accounts and 150,000 active players when it shut down in response to a cease and desist letter on April 10, 2016. In the wake of Nostalrius's shutdown, a Change.org petition for official Classic servers was created and received over 200,000 signatures, and ex-World of Warcraft team lead Mark Kern personally delivered it to Blizzard's president at the time, Michael Morhaime. Blizzard acknowledged the community's desires, and stated they had been discussing legacy servers internally for years but technical problems prevented them from implementing them. Consequently, the Nostalrius team released their source code to Valkyrie-WoW, another long-standing private Vanilla WoW server, hosted in Russia, and the Nostalrius servers returned on December 17, 2016, under the name of Elysium Project, with the player database as it had been just before the shutdown in April.

On November 3, 2017, at BlizzCon 2017, the then-Executive Producer of World of Warcraft, J. Allen Brack, announced Classic on stage during the WoW panel. Details of the project were further revealed in interviews: it was going to be a faithful recreation of the original version of the game, but running on the modern infrastructure. A developer blog post published on June 15, 2018, further detailed the technical implementation, and a panel was held during BlizzCon 2018 that explained the development process behind the game. To create Classic, Blizzard ported the original 1.12.1 game data and assets to their modern server and client infrastructure. This allows Classic to share much of the source code between the modern version of the game, which removes the development overhead of maintaining two different versions of the game, and also means that Classic will have all the performance and security improvements added to the original game server and client that were absent in the 2006 version.

== The Burning Crusade Classic ==
In March 2020 Blizzard sent out a survey to Classic players gauging their interest in a Classic Burning Crusade game. After positive reactions it was verified in February 2021 and in the last week of May it became available for download leading up to its release on June 1.

== Wrath of the Lich King Classic ==
In April 2022, Blizzard announced Wrath of the Lich King Classic, scheduled for release later in the year. On July 25, Blizzard released a trailer with the confirmed release date of September 26.

At the launch of the Wrath of the Lich King Classic, the developers announced an approach of minimal changes, aiming to preserve the original game's experience while allowing for certain adjustments to improve gameplay. This represented a shift from the philosophy adopted for World of Warcraft Classic in 2019, when Blizzard sought to reproduce the original game's mechanics and behaviors as faithfully as possible, including unintended interactions and technical limitations.

Traditionally, both unofficial private servers and Blizzard's official Classic servers have used the "end-patch state" for each expansion, meaning that the class balancing and features are based on the final phase of the original games. In Wrath of the Lich King, the end-patch state included a Dungeon Finder tool that allowed players to enter a queue and be automatically matched with other players to complete 5-man content. Blizzard opted to not include the Dungeon Finder, instead offering an improved in-game bulletin board system where players can look for groups for any type of content, in effort to promote social interaction.

In the lead-up to launch, Blizzard implemented one of its first major changes: Joyous Journeys, a limited-time 50% experience buff intended to ease the leveling experience for new and returning players. Joyous Journeys was active during the Wrath of the Lich King pre-patch, and returned again one month before each new content phase was set to launch. Blizzard also made it so that any player could immediately create a Death Knight character on any server. Previously, this required that the player reach level 55 before being able to unlock the Death Knight class. This was later reverted to reduce abuse by bots.

In the first content phase, the health and damage of all mobs in the Naxxramas raid were increased in order to provide players more of a challenge, due to the original release in 2008 being rather undertuned and quickly defeated.

The second content phase included broader changes, including entirely new systems. With the introduction of the Ulduar raid, Blizzard implemented a series of changes and "catch-up mechanics" to make acquiring gear and items from Phase 1 easier and faster. First was changing the loot tables of Phase 1 bosses: in Phase 2, all bosses on 10-player difficulty would instead drop items from their 25-man difficulty. The items from 10-man difficulty were scattered across bosses in Heroic Dungeons, and could be accessed by doing the dungeons on a new "Titan Rune Dungeon" difficulty. Players referred to this new difficulty as "Heroic+", as the feature is reminiscent of Mythic and Mythic+ Dungeons from later World of Warcraft expansions.

Like for Naxxramas, the developers sought to release the main raid of Phase 2, Ulduar, with a higher difficulty. All bosses were released in their most "pre-nerf" state, giving players the hardest possible version of each boss from 2009. To give players greater incentive to continue running Ulduar in later phases, gear on all difficulty modes was given higher stats and higher item levels. During this phase, Blizzard also introduced the first significant changes to PvE class balancing, by changing abilities to increase performance or eliminate newfound play styles that were detrimental to group content.

Several cosmetic changes also came in Wrath of the Lich King Classic. When the in-game barbershop was originally added in 2008, players were able to pay in-game currency to subtly alter their characters appearance, such as changing their hairstyle and certain accessories. Blizzard later added a paid Character Recustomization service, which allowed players to fully recreate their character, changing gender, skin color, and more. For the Classic version, these recustomization options were made baseline, and any player could use in-game gold to completely recreate their character's appearance, including gender (now called Body Type). Wrath of the Lich King's original release also included paid Race Change and Faction Change features, which were both added in Phase 2 of Wrath of the Lich King Classic.

The "WoW Token" became available for Wrath of the Lich King Classic players on May 23, 2023. Originally launched during the Warlords of Draenor expansion, this item allows players to exchange real money for the token, which can then be exchanged for in-game gold or a 1-month WoW subscription.

Phase 3 for Wrath Classic launched on June 20, 2023, adding the Argent Tournament area and daily quests, Trial of the Champion dungeon, Trial of the Crusader and Grand Crusader raids, Onyxia's Lair raid, Trial of the Champion dungeon, as well as Defense Protocol: Beta, a new difficulty level for existing endgame dungeons. This phase saw the introduction of "Heroic" difficulty for raiding content, which was immediately available without requiring players to first complete the "Normal" difficulty mode. Unlike the original release of Patch 3.2, the heroic and normal difficulty of raids in this tier shared a lockout, and could instead be toggled on a boss-by-boss basis.

Wrath Classic's 4th Phase was released on October 10, 2023, adding the Icecrown Citadel raid, three Frozen Halls dungeons, Defense Protocol: Gamma difficulty for existing dungeons, and several new features. Among these was the introduction of Random Dungeon Finder, a tool that allows players to join a queue and be automatically grouped with others for the specific or randomized content. Additionally, the Pets and Collections systems were added, allowing players to access mounts, pets, heirlooms and toy items from characters across their account.

Phase 5 was released on January 11, 2024, adding the Ruby Sanctum raid.

== Cataclysm Classic ==
At BlizzCon 2023, Blizzard officially announced that Wrath of the Lich King Classic would continue into Cataclysm content, coming some time in the first half of 2024. The announcement noted that gameplay changes would be coming to the Classic version, such as continuing the "Titan Rune Dungeon" system, as well as faster leveling speeds and a faster content release schedule.

The 4.0 Cataclysm pre-patch launched on April 30, 2024, adding the new races of Worgen and Goblin, unlocking different race/class combinations, as well as the revamped 0-60 zones and quests. On May 20, 2024, the expansion officially launched, unlocking the new level 80-85 zones and dungeons.

The Rise of the Zandalari patch was introduced on July 30, 2024, adding reimagined versions of the Zul'Gurub and Zul'Aman raids as 5-player dungeons for max level characters.

Content in the Rage of the Firelands patch became available on October 29, 2024, bringing the Firelands raid as well as "Elemental Rune Protocol: Inferno" dungeons, which allowed players to complete heroic dungeons at a higher difficulty level in order to earn tokens and purchase select items from tier 11 raids. The release of the Firelands raid was delayed, opening on November 6, 2024.

The Hour of Twilight patch was released on February 18, 2025, adding the Dragon Soul raid, Hour of Twilight Dungeons and "Elemental Rune Protocol: Twilight" difficulty for existing dungeons. Looking For Raid (LFR) was excluded from the patch, despite it being launched with this patch in the original 2011 release of Cataclysm. Players could instead acquire LFR gear from running Protocol: Twilight dungeons.

== Mists of Pandaria Classic ==
In November 2024, during a 30th Anniversary livestream for the Warcraft series, Blizzard officially announced that the Mists of Pandaria would be coming to World of Warcraft Classic some time in summer 2025. In April 2025, Blizzard allowed users to begin signing up to beta test Mists of Pandaria Classic.

Mists of Pandaria Classic launched on July 21, 2025. In addition to the original 85-90 quests, zones, dungeons and raids, Blizzard introduced "Celestial Dungeons", following the format of the "Elemental Rune" and "Titan Rune" dungeon modes from Cataclysm Classic and Wrath of the Lich King Classic. Celestial Dungeons were intended to be a replacement for the Raid Finder difficult mode, as Blizzard opted not to implement any version of Raid Finder in Mists of Pandaria Classic. The first raid tier featured a staggered rollout of the three raid instances, followed by the inclusion of each raid's loot table into the Celestial Dungeon system.

In September 2025, Blizzard opened free character transfers to consolidate players onto "Mega Realms" in each region, citing the benefits of higher player concentration that were observed after executing previous transfers for Season of Discovery and Classic Era realms.

On December 9, 2025, Phase 3 "The Thunder King" of Mists of Pandaria Classic launched, adding the Isle of Thunder and Isle of Giants zones, as well as the Throne of Thunder raid and new story content based around the Shado-Pan Assault faction and continuation of the legendary questline. The Throne of Thunder raid opened two days later on December 11, 2025. This is the second to last raid in the Mists of Pandaria Expansion.

At Blizzard's "State of Azeroth" event in early 2026, a roadmap was unveiled for Mists of Pandaria Classic, placing Phase 4 of content in Spring 2026, and the final Phase 5 of content, which includes the Siege of Orgrimmar raid, in Summer 2026.

On June 2, 2026, the final "Siege of Orgrimmar" content patch of Mists of Pandaria Classic launched, adding the Timeless Isle, Legendary Cloak questline, Proving Grounds, and the Siege of Orgrimmar raid.

== 20th Anniversary Edition ==
During Warcraft Direct 2024, Blizzard announced a re-release of the 2004 version of World of Warcraft, which launched shortly after on November 21, 2024. Named the "20th Anniversary Edition", this version of Classic retains most of the features from the 2019 release of World of Warcraft: Classic, but also includes certain quality-of-life updates, such as the Chronoboon Displacer, updated Honor System, removal of the Buff and Debuff Limits, as well as a native LFG tool and the ability to enable a more modern guild panel UI. Blizzard stated on its announcement that the 20th Anniversary Edition would be continuing into The Burning Crusade some time in late 2025 or early 2026.

=== 20th Anniversary Edition: The Burning Crusade ===
On February 5, 2026, the 20th Anniversary Edition servers transitioned into The Burning Crusade. At launch, the anniversary edition of The Burning Crusade includes several changes from the 2021 "Classic" version, including account-wide attunements, raid-wide Bloodlust/Heroism buffs and immediate access to guild banks.

=== 20th Anniversary Edition: Hardcore ===
Blizzard also released Hardcore-only servers with the launch of the 20th Anniversary Edition, which feature previous permadeath mechanics and an optional "Self-Found Mode". Blizzard has stated that the Hardcore servers will not be progressing to The Burning Crusade, and characters on them will be given the option to transfer to Normal realms to continue playing in The Burning Crusade Classic.

== Classic Era and Seasonal Servers ==
=== Classic Era ===
Before the launch of Burning Crusade Classic, Blizzard created separate copies of each server, known as Classic Era servers, while the original realms all were set to automatically progress with content from Burning Crusade. Players were able to pay to create copies of their existing characters on the Classic Era servers, which would stay in a 1.12.1 state, with all content phases unlocked. Similarly, players could freely create new characters on Classic Era servers to replay content from the game in that state.

=== Season of Mastery ===
Reinvented versions of World of Warcraft Classic have launched as separate servers intended to give players a fresh experience with the game. Blizzard began creating seasonal Classic servers in November 2021 with the launch of Season of Mastery, which introduced changes to the game's mechanics that made it more challenging. Season of Mastery also included an "ironman" mode, by which players could attempt to progress without letting their characters die. Season of Mastery officially concluded on February 14, 2023.

=== Classic Hardcore ===
On August 24, 2023, Blizzard launched official Hardcore Classic servers that feature permadeath and the ability for characters to "duel to the death", known as Mak'gora. This game mode was inspired by a community of players on Classic Era realms who used addons to create an unofficial permadeath experience, with other rules such as restricting access to the auction house or trading with other characters. Characters that die on official Hardcore servers are not able to log back in to the character or resurrect, but are able to transfer the character to existing Classic Era realms.

==== Self-Found Mode ====
On February 29, 2024, a Self-Found Mode was added to Hardcore servers, allowing players to formally apply an extra set of restrictions to their character. In addition to the normal Hardcore ruleset, Self-Found Mode prevents players using the auction house, and sending or receiving mail. Self-Found Mode is only available for new characters, as an option during character creation. Players are able to turn off Self-Found Mode, but are unable to turn it back on once disabled.

=== Season of Discovery ===
On November 30, 2023, Season of Discovery was launched as a seasonal server type. Discovery introduced new content to the base "Vanilla" world for the first time, including a new system of class abilities called runes, allowing certain classes to perform new roles, and additions to existing systems such as professions. Discovery launched with gated leveling, where players can only progress to level 25 in the first phase and subsequent phases will increase the level cap incrementally.

Additionally, Season of Discovery features forced faction balance upon launch which would lock players from creating a new character of the dominant faction. Each phase also featured reworked PvE and PvP content, such as 10-player Blackfathom Deeps raid and a world PvP event in Ashenvale. Blizzard tested new methods to combat Real-money Trading (RMT) within Season of Discovery, including restricting new accounts ability to trade, send mail, or use the auction house within their first 30 days.

Phase 2 of Discovery raised the level cap to 40 and converted the dungeon Gnomeregan into a 10-player raid, added a PvP event in Stranglethorn Vale called The Blood Moon, and introduced restrictions to players participating in so-called "GDKP" runs, where players bid on items that drop from raid bosses with gold.

Phase 3 of Discovery raised the level cap to 50 and converted the Temple of Atal'Hakkar ("Sunken Temple") dungeon into a 20-player raid. Persistent world events called Nightmare Incursions were also introduced, allowing players to complete specific quests and missions to gain reputation with a new faction and purchase rewards.

Phase 4 of Discovery increased the level cap to the max level of 60, added a new 5-player dungeon, Demon Fall Canyon, and unlocked a reworked version of Molten Core as a 20-player raid, as well as a reworked 40-man version of Onyxia's Lair.

Phase 5 of Discovery introduced updated versions of the Zul'Gurub and Blackwing Lair raids, as well as the new raid Crystal Vale. A new boss was also added to the Demon Fall Canyon dungeon from Phase 4.

Phase 6 of Discovery added the "48-Hour War" event leading to the opening of the Ruins of Ahn'Qiraj and Temple of Ahn'Qiraj raids. Ruins was retuned for 10+ players, while Temple changed to 20+ players. The emerald dragons of Emeriss, Ysondre, Lethon and Taerar were moved into a special "Nightmare Grove" raid instance, rather than being open-world bosses.

Phase 7 of Discovery introduced the Naxxramas raid, along with the Scourge Invasion event. The Karazhan Crypts, an unfinished area in Deadwind Pass, was introduced as a new 5-player dungeon featuring new quests and items. This was originally planned as the final full patch of the seasonal server, but more content was released following community feedback.

Phase 8 of Discovery introduced the first all-new raid: the Scarlet Enclave. This phase also added New Avalon, the first new zone added to the Classic world, along with new quests and supporting content. The developer team confirmed that this would be the final content added to Season of Discovery.

== World of Warcraft: Forever ==
At Blizzcon 2026, Blizzard announced World of Warcraft: Forever, an alternate version of the "Classic" 2004 release of World of Warcraft. Forever is intended as a "Classic+" version of World of Warcraft, where players progress to level 60 in "familiar yet fresh" zones of Azeroth from the original game, while discovering new abilities, systems and experiences.

== Reception ==
Reception

Aggregate score
Aggregator	Score
Metacritic	(Classic) 81/100 (TBC) 79/100

PC Gamer scored Classic an 80 out of 100 and wrote, "WoW Classic is more than just a new version of an iconic game, it feels like a window to a time where interacting with people online still felt novel and exciting." Polygon praised the difficulty of Classic and its overall design to nurture "social connections" in comparison to its modern counterpart, calling it a "faithful snapshot of a moment in time".

Since launch, Blizzard has faced some criticism from players for their use of layering technology for the Classic servers. In addition to splitting the communities within each unique realm, players were found to be using the "layers" to exploit the in-game economy. However, as of October 10, 2019, most realms are down to a single layer, with only the highest population servers still utilizing additional layers.

The game won the award for "PC Game of the Year" at the 2019 Golden Joystick Awards, and was nominated for "Game, Classic Revival" at the NAVGTR Awards.
