= Nostalrius =

Private World of Warcraft server

Nostalrius was a private World of Warcraft server, which opened on February 28, 2015. The server ran Patch 1.12, catering to aficionados of the early version of the game, nicknamed "Vanilla". Stating breach of copyright, Blizzard Entertainment issued the administrators of the server a cease and desist letter, and so the Nostalrius server was shut down on April 10, 2016, leading to outcry on Facebook and Twitter and large-scale coverage in mainstream computing journalism.

It was one of the most successful private servers to date with over 800,000 accounts registered. After the conclusion of Nostalrius servers, a discussion about the possibility of Blizzard opening official "Legacy" servers had begun.

== Discussion of legacy servers ==
The launching of the private Nostalrius server brought the issue of "vanilla" legacy servers to the forefront of discussion for World of Warcraft. A petition on Change.org received over 280,000 signatures pleading Blizzard to hear the voices. Many famous YouTubers have made videos on this very topic discussing the pros and cons of Legacy servers, and it managed to get the attention of one of the middle managers of World of Warcraft, Mark Kern, who supports the idea of Legacy servers. Blizzard Entertainment was silent on the issue until April 25, where the lead game developer responded to the discussion.

== Blizzard's response ==
On April 25, 2016, J. Allen Brack responded to the Nostalrius discussion. He spoke of the possibility of "Pristine" realms, with many of the new features turned off, to make leveling harder, and social interaction more prevalent in the game.

On November 3, 2017, Blizzard announced World of Warcraft: Classic, an official "vanilla server", in response to the popularity of Nostalrius and Elysium Project. It was released 27 August 2019.

== Further developments and the return of Nostalrius ==
After a month or so of large scale protests, Blizzard invited the Nostalrius team to the Blizzard HQ to present the case for Vanilla. An eighty-page "post-mortem" document describing the development of Nostalrius, the problems that happened and some marketing strategies was presented to Blizzard, and after some time, released on the Nostalrius forums. In the following six months, Blizzard did not respond at all to any communication from the Nostalrius team. Allen Brack and the World of Warcraft development team announced they would not be making any statements about Vanilla at the 2016 BlizzCon convention. Consequently, the Nostalrius team released their source code to Valkyrie-WoW, another long-standing private Vanilla WoW server, hosted in Russia, and the Nostalrius servers returned on December 17, 2016, under the name of Elysium Project, with the player database as it had been just before the shutdown in April. In October 2017, the Elysium servers were taken offline when it had been revealed that some staff had been involved in gold selling and character manipulation, which went against the 'Blizzlike' philosophy the team purportedly stood for. The servers returned one month later, with the project rebranded as Elysium Project "Nighthaven".

== WoW Classic and ties to Nostalrius ==
In an interview published on November 4, 2017, by Eurogamer, J. Allen Brack said they would welcome the involvement of Daemon and Viper, the leads of the Nostalrius project in the production of World of Warcraft: Classic. However, at BlizzCon 2018, developers Brian Birmingham and John Hight stated that there were no members of the Nostalrius team working on WoW Classic.
