= Washington Policy Center =

Free-market think tank

- Location: Seattle, Washington
- Chairman: Greg Porter
- President and CEO: Steven Hatting
- Revenue: $7.16 million (2024)
- Expenses: $3.92 million (2024)
- Staff: 25
- Website: www.washingtonpolicy.org
- Formerly called: Washington Institute Foundation

The Washington Policy Center (WPC) is a think tank based in the state of Washington. The organization's stated mission is "to advocate for government transparency and accountability, as well as to improve lives by promoting sound public policy based on free-market solutions." It has a statewide staff of approximately 25 and offices in Seattle and Spokane. The organization is divided into eight research centers: Agriculture, Education, Environment, Government Reform, Health Care, Small Business, Transportation, and Worker Rights. WPC is an affiliate of the State Policy Network, a nonprofit organization that serves as a network for conservative and libertarian think tanks focusing on state-level policy in the United States.

WPC operated a free public-service website, WashingtonVotes.org, which tracked what bills state legislators introduce and support. WashingtonVotes.org provided a roll call service to state media outlets while the legislature is in session.

The organization uncovered an error in Sound Transit's defense in a $500 million class-action lawsuit regarding the collection of car tab tax charges. The state Attorney General's office acknowledged the error. The constitutionality of the car-tab collection levied by Sound Transit was upheld by the State Supreme Court in February 2020.

== See also ==
- Freedom Foundation
