= Firefall (video game) =

2014 video game

- Developer: Red 5 Studios
- Publishers: Red 5 Studios; Garena
- Designers: Scott Youngblood; Scott Rudi
- Programmers: Eric Le Saux (AI); Lutz Justen (Graphics); David Nikdel (Gameplay)
- Writers: Scott Burgess; Mark Kern; Orson Scott Card; Richard Pearsey; James B. Jones
- Composers: Michael Bross; Boon Sim
- Platform: Microsoft Windows
- Release: WW: July 29, 2014
- Genres: Massively multiplayer online First-person shooter Third-person shooter
- Mode: Multiplayer

Firefall was a science fiction free-to-play massive multiplayer online open world shooter video game developed and released by Red 5 Studios in 2014. Officially announced in 2010, the game entered closed beta in 2011 and open beta in 2013. It was the first and only game to be developed by Red 5 Studios, combining elements from both the shooter genre and some role-playing aspects from the massive multiplayer online genre. Firefall was shut down in 2017.

== Gameplay ==
Players wear power armor, called Battleframes, that grants health regeneration, jump jets, and a retractable pair of wings that allows players to glide. Each Battleframe has a unique main weapon, a standard secondary weapon, a set of three unique abilities, and a fourth special ability that charges while the player is in combat. There are five main types of Battleframes. The player begins with the standard issue version of each of the five types of Battleframes, and can change between them freely. Players level up by completing missions and collect equipment from downed enemies to further enhance their Battleframe's attributes or to add entirely new features to their weapons and abilities. Upon fully leveling their Battleframe, the player is awarded a token that allows them to unlock an Advanced Battleframe with additional specialized weapons and abilities.

Much of the combat is influenced by Tribes, a game the lead designer worked on previously, and centers around the use of jump jets. This feature adds a third dimension to combat that allows the player remain in the air for long periods of time and to quickly travel to the tops of buildings. A retractable pair of wings further enhances the emphasis on the third-dimension as players are able to dive-bomb enemy positions or quickly escape hazardous situations.

In PvE zones, the player can engage in: dynamically generated missions and events that spawn at fixed locations throughout the open world, procedurally generated encounters that spawn at the player's location, on-demand missions that the player choose when and where to spawn, and world events that bring players together either to fight off the game's antagonist or to participate in group activities. The core goal of these missions is to allow the player to level up and acquire resources and equipment. Friendly fire and PvP combat is disabled by default, but a player can declare a duel with another player and engage in PvP combat.

Once the player has fully leveled their Battleframe, the player can then choose to engage in: an open world PvP zone to collect additional resources, or max-level zones and instanced missions where they bring the fight to the game's main antagonist in large scale battles. These missions also push the game's narrative forward as most of the story is told through instanced missions. At this point, the player's core goal changes from leveling up and acquiring resources and equipment to fighting to keep the player's playable zones from falling to the game's antagonist and acquiring notoriety in the game's competitive leader boards.

The game servers automatically create or shut down the number of available shards in order to prevent overcrowding in the game world. The spawn rate of missions is likewise adjusted to scale with the number of players online to prevent the players from getting bored or overwhelmed. Firefall's servers use cloud computing through Amazon Web Services to scale the number of servers to fit demand, automatically acquiring more CPU and memory during peak hours and releasing them when they are no longer needed. The game server places players on shards where they are most likely to become a part of an online community by prioritizing shards with the player's friends and clanmates. If the player is not a part of a clan or does not have any friends available, the server tries to place the player on the same shard for each of their gameplay sessions in order build familiarity with the other players who happen to share the same play-space. Players can jump between shards by joining squads with friends or clanmates.

The game has a player driven economy with features designed to deter gold farming. The game client directly interfaces with Twitch, which allow players to stream their play sessions without requiring a third-party application.

== Synopsis ==
The Firefall is an event that takes place in 2178 after an asteroid predicted to be a near miss gets caught by the Moon's gravity and crashes into Earth. The catastrophe plummets mankind into a dark age known as the Nine Year Winter and many large governments, including that of the United States, collapse. During the dark age, scientists discover a new substance called Crystite from the asteroid fragments. Found to be a powerful energy source, Crystite fuels the reconstruction and a new golden age of mankind. Despite the seemingly unlimited potential of Crystite, mankind wanted more and followed the trajectory of the Asteroid to Alpha Prime, a star system in Alpha Centauri. With the first massive loads of Crystite arriving from Alpha Prime, the governments of Earth, unified under The Accord, began construction of the Arclight, a warship that achieves faster-than-light travel by folding space in a process known as Arcfolding. The purpose of the Arclight was to prevent a potential revolt on Alpha Prime that would cripple Earth's economy due to mankind's reliance on Crystite. As the Arclight began its first attempt at faster-than-light travel in 2233, its large engines rips a hole in space that allows the Melding, an extra-dimensional energy storm, to emerge. Unable to complete the Arcfold, the Arclight crashes outside of Fortaleza, Brazil. The Melding engulfs most of Earth with the exception of areas near and surrounding the wreckage of the Arclight, now used as a base by The Accord, with its engines being used to keep the Melding at bay.

The playable story takes place four years after the Arclight's attempt to fold space, known as M-Day. The Melding has transformed Earth, mutating the wildlife and reshaping the landscape. The Melding is lethal to the player, which keeps the player constrained to the playable area. The player assumes the role of a mercenary working for The Accord. Crystite acts as an in-game currency that is rewarded to the player for completing missions. The main antagonist is the Chosen, who appear to be humans transformed by the Melding. Secondary antagonists include: Bandits, humans who refuse to join the Accord; Aranhas, an invasive spider-like insectoid accidentally brought over from Alpha Prime; and wildlife transformed by the Melding. The players' main objective is to aid in mankind's survival and to ultimately defeat the Chosen and repel the Melding.

== Development history ==
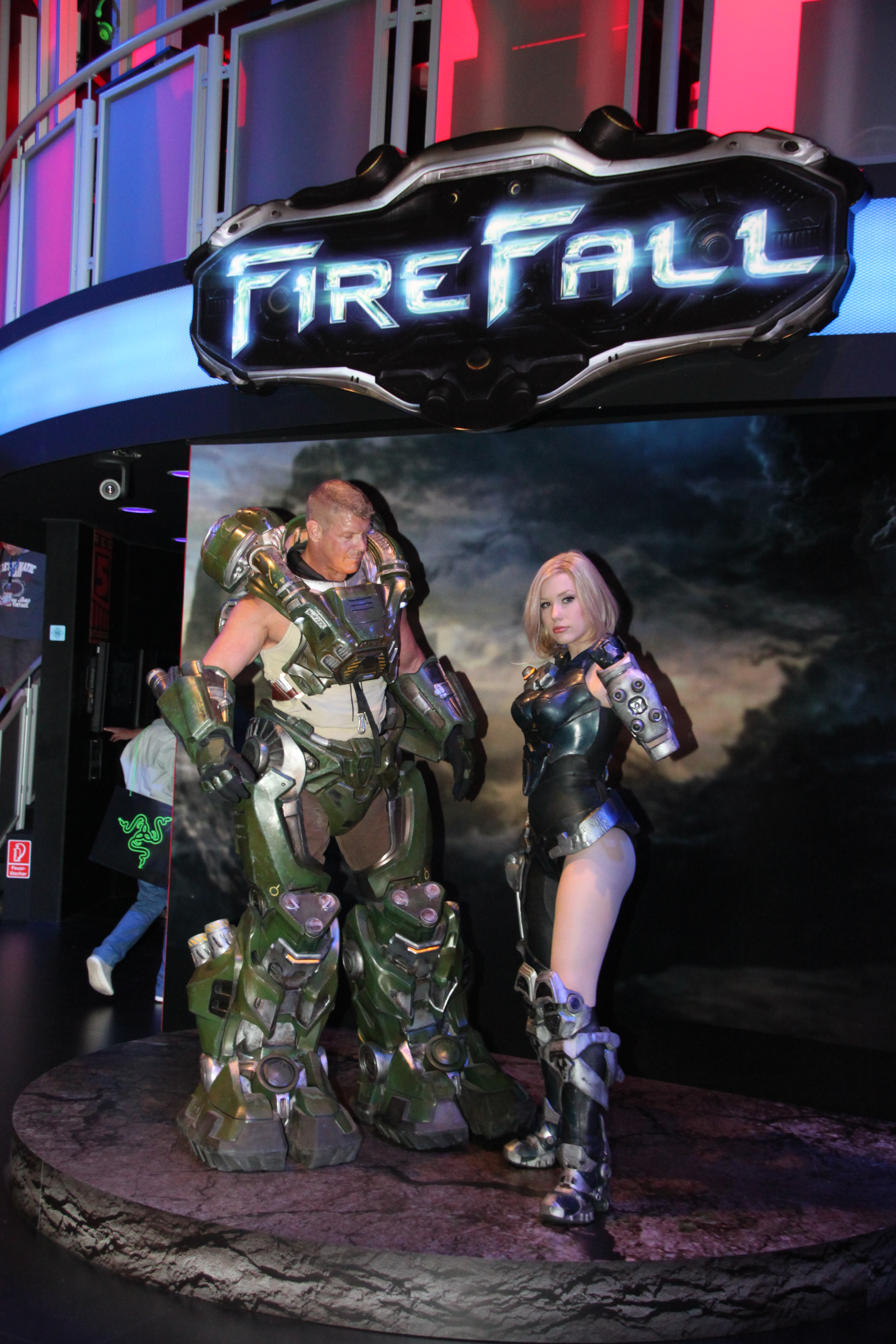
Firefall promotion at Gamescom 2012

Firefall used a custom server and graphics engine with its renderer based on Offset Engine by Offset Software that was sold to Intel in February 2008. Offset Engine was originally built for Offset Software's first person shooter Project Offset that was cancelled in 2010 by Intel due to the failure of Larrabee. Red 5 Studios relationship with Project Offset gave them full access to source code, which they heavily modified to suit their needs. Modifications to the Offset Engine include a custom texture streaming engine, a character and terrain system designed to handle hundreds of players in a large open world, a vegetation and prop system, custom lighting and FX, and integration of Havok Physics onto the server-side. The server code is built in-house.

Firefall was under development for over five years with its title undergoing several internal name changes before it was officially announced on September 3, 2010, at the Penny Arcade Expo in Seattle where it received high praise. The game became available to the public for the first time at PAX East 2011 where Red 5 held a live multiplayer tournament. The game entered its first closed beta test on September 2, 2011, and began continuous 24/7 closed beta testing on April 2, 2012, with the NDA being dropped April 6 during PAX East 2012. The game began monetization on August 24, 2012, allowing players to purchase cosmetic items and time compression bonuses that allows players to level up more quickly. A founders pack that allowed players to purchase access to the closed beta was offered on August 28, 2012.

During this time, the game announced $1 million in prize money for its PvP tournament throughout 2013 in order to stimulate its eSports program. The game entered open beta on July 9, 2013. After meeting limited success with its eSports Program, instanced PvP was removed from the game and none of the previously announced $1 million was paid out to the players. Firefall has made numerous changes to its core systems throughout its beta phase: iterating on different progression systems, trying different economic models, and testing different implementations of its mission types and back-end server technologies. The open beta ended on July 29, 2014, with the game being released on Steam or through an in house installer.

The art style in Firefall is primarily inspired by Masamune Shirow's Appleseed, Hayao Miyazaki, and Udon Entertainment's Street Fighter. The Firefall Original Soundtrack was composed by Michael Bross and Boon Sim during beta with Chris Lord & JJ Lee composing additional soundtracks for the game's release.

== Developer ==
Red 5 Studios
- Type: Subsidiary of The9
- Industry: Video games
- Founded: 2005; 21 years ago
- Defunct: 2016; 10 years ago
- Headquarters: Irvine, California, United States

Red 5 Studios was an American video game company that was known for its high proportion of former employees of Blizzard Entertainment. The founders previously worked on World of Warcraft. Mark Kern was a team lead, William Petras was art director, and Taewon Yun was part of the company's Korean operation which oversaw the launch of World of Warcraft in Asia. The company's only game release was Firefall.

=== History ===
In early 2007, Red 5 Studios launched a campaign to increase the size of the organization by recruiting the top game developers in the industry. Citing a lack of success using conventional recruiting methods, Red 5 turned to San Francisco-based Pool and Orange County-based Airbag Industries, to help them send a personalized recruiting pitch to each of the 100 prospective hires. In early February, the project was completed, and each of the "dream hires" was delivered a package containing 5 nested art boxes, with an iPod Shuffle containing a personalized message in the center. As of June 2007, three of the candidates had joined Red 5, and a fourth was being interviewed.

On April 23, 2009, Red 5 Studios announced the closing of their Shanghai office. In January 2010 Red 5 laid off about 30 people. In March 2010, it was revealed that Chinese company The9 has acquired a majority stake in Red 5.

On September 8, 2010, Red 5 Studios revealed Firefall at PAX Prime in Seattle. In July 2011, Red 5 announced a collaboration with Orson Scott Card, author of the science fiction novel Ender's Game, as writer of the Firefall story as well as the creation of a manga novel co-written by his daughter Emily Janice Card and drawn by Joe Ng. In August, 2011 after PAX Prime, Red 5 began closed beta testing on Firefall.

On September 30, 2011, it was announced that Red 5 Singapore, a wholly owned subsidiary of The9, would substitute Webzen for publishing in all of the countries worldwide other than the United States, Canada and European countries. On October 21, 2011, Chinese company The9 established Red 5 Singapore to handle game operations in Asia.

Red 5 Studios pulled support from 2012 E3 in protest of the ESA's support of SOPA and PIPA. Mark Kern instead created League for Gamers with the 50,000 dollars intended to be spent on E3. Red 5 announced it is to open a new 30-man office in Cork, Ireland, initially dedicated to European support and localization for the upcoming free-to-play shooter Firefall.

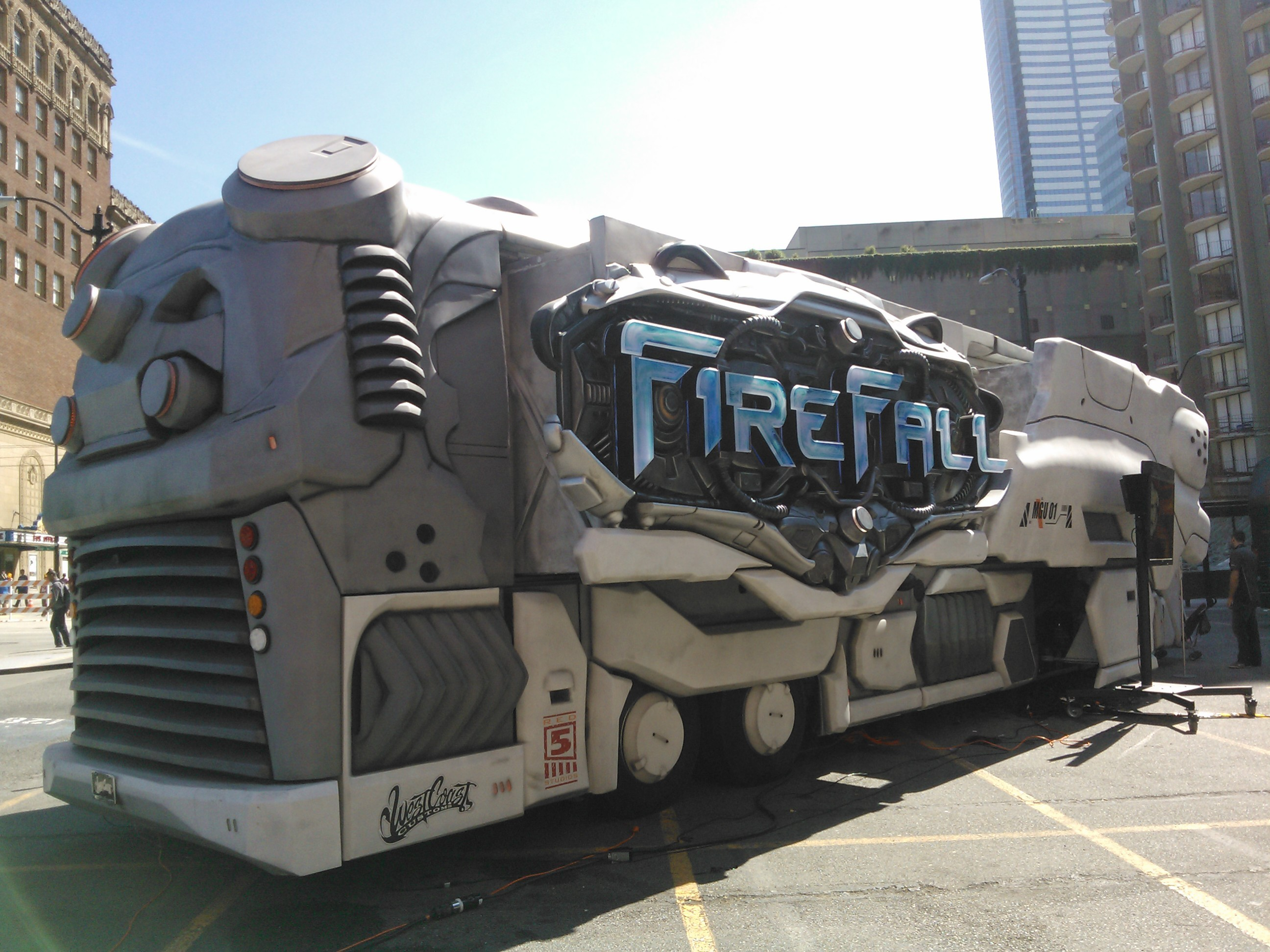
The Firefall promotional bus makes its debut appearance at Anime Expo 2012

In 2013, Red 5 Studios attempted to promote the game by commissioning West Coast Customs to create a custom bus, dubbed the "Firefall Mobile Gaming Unit". Intended to expand via hydraulics and host LAN competitions, the project faced significant issues when the bus was delivered late, over-budget, and missed major conference premieres.

On December 20, 2013, Red 5 Board of Directors voted out Mark Kern of CEO position, Kern was the last of Red 5′s four founders with the company, all of whom formerly worked at Blizzard Entertainment.

On May 26, 2015, Chris Whiteside, the former lead producer of ArenaNet on Guild Wars, then the design director for Guild Wars 2, attended an interview as a member of Red 5 Studios, stated “We’ve been through the fire, and we’ve grown close. These guys (Red 5 Studios) have bonded into a truly collaborative business, and our overall plan is to become the best online world building studio in the business. We know what people remember from our checkered past, but we know we can prove we’ve come through the fire and controversy ready and raring.”

Red 5 Studios in November 2015 laid off 40 employees (including Chris Whiteside) and several more in December 2015. On December 25, 2015, Christmas Day, many employees received a letter in lieu of a paycheck: "Hi Team, I regret to inform you that Red5 currently does not have the funds necessary to meet our payroll scheduled for today Friday, December 25. Due to this, there will not be payroll paid this week. Red5 and The9, our parent company, is currently working to resolve this, during the holidays, as soon as possible. We are hopeful we’ll be able to resolve this and will update the team immediately."

In July 2016, all of the Red5 development team, including the community manager FadedPez, had been fired. There were no official statements regarding the future of Firefall from The9, but it was confirmed that the servers were still on, however the authenticating servers for new players were not. As of July 7, 2017, the servers were officially shut down.

== Reception ==
Reception

Aggregate score
Aggregator	Score
Metacritic	60/100

Review scores
Publication	Score
GameSpot	5/10
IGN	5.7/10
PC Gamer (US)	47/100

Firefall launched in 2014 to mixed reviews primarily criticizing the quest design as repetitive and lackluster group play mechanics, as well as slow world-travel between areas.
