= Mark Kern =

Video game designer

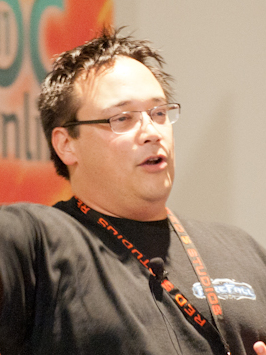
- Kern in 2011
- Education: University of Rochester (BA); Boston University (JD)
- Occupations: Game developer; Game designer
- Employer(s): Blizzard Entertainment (1997–2005); Red 5 Studios (2005–2013)
- Known for: World of Warcraft, Firefall

Mark Edward Kern, also known as Grummz, is a former video game executive. He worked for Blizzard Entertainment from 1997 to 2005 and served as co-founder and CEO of Red 5 Studios during the development and promotion of the video game Firefall.

Kern graduated from the University of Rochester and received a Juris Doctor degree from the Boston University School of Law. Kern was involved in online activism opposing the Stop Online Piracy Act (SOPA).

== Early life and education ==
Mark Kern attended college at the University of Rochester, earning a Bachelor of Arts in cognitive science in 1992. He earned a Juris Doctor from Boston University School of Law in 1995, where he was an editor on the university's Journal of Science and Technology Law.

== Career ==
=== Blizzard Entertainment ===
Kern joined Blizzard Entertainment in 1997, initially serving as an Associate Producer for StarCraft. His roles expanded to include Producer of StarCraft 64, Producer of Diablo II, and Team Lead for World of Warcraft. Kern departed Blizzard in 2005.

=== Red 5 Studios ===
Following his tenure at Blizzard, Kern co-founded the game development company Red 5 Studios alongside three other former Blizzard employees and was its CEO during the development of Firefall.

Tech in Asia reported allegations that Kern overspent on promotion for Firefall, including a themed promotional bus estimated to cost approximately $3 million and a dedicated video-production operation. Two unnamed Red 5 employees told The Escapist that Kern's absences and decision-making had disrupted the studio's work.

In 2013, Kern was removed from his position as CEO of Red 5 Studios by the board of directors. He referred to his time at the company as his own "Kobayashi Maru".

=== MEK Entertainment and later work ===
Kern founded the studio MEK Entertainment in 2014. The company raised $1 million in seed funding for an Oculus Rift virtual reality MMO.

In 2016, Kern began seeking crowdfunding for Em-8er, a "spiritual successor" to Firefall. Kern did an interview with YouTuber Upper Echelon in Sept 2024, claiming that about 600K has been raised so far for Em-8er.

== Online activism and later activity ==
In response to the Stop Online Piracy Act and the PROTECT IP Act in 2012, Kern initiated a lobbying group named League4Gamers.

In 2016, Kern became involved in the Nostalrius petition to convince Blizzard to consider reviving vanilla servers for World of Warcraft. Following the Blitzchung controversy in which a Hong Kong eSports player was penalized by Blizzard for voicing his support of the 2019–2020 Hong Kong protests during a Blizzard streaming event in 2019, Kern quit playing World of Warcraft and called for a boycott of Blizzard.

Kern has been involved in right-wing activist causes. During the online backlash and criticism against the Canadian narrative development studio Sweet Baby Inc. around unsubstantiated claims of "forcing" diversity, Kern opposed efforts to increase awareness of diversity and related progressive causes in March 2024.
