= History of massively multiplayer online games =

The history of massively multiplayer online games spans over thirty years and hundreds of massively multiplayer online games (MMOG) titles. The origin and influence on MMO games stems from MUDs, online RPGs, Dungeons & Dragons (D&D) and earlier social games.

== Early Multiplayer Online Games ==
=== The first virtual worlds ===
In 1974, Mazewar introduced the first graphic virtual world, providing a first-person perspective view of a maze in which players roamed around shooting at each other. It was also the first networked game, in which players at different computers could visually interact in a virtual space. The initial implementation was over a serial cable; however, when one of the authors began attending MIT in 1974, the game was enhanced so that it could be played across the ARPAnet, forerunner of the modern Internet.

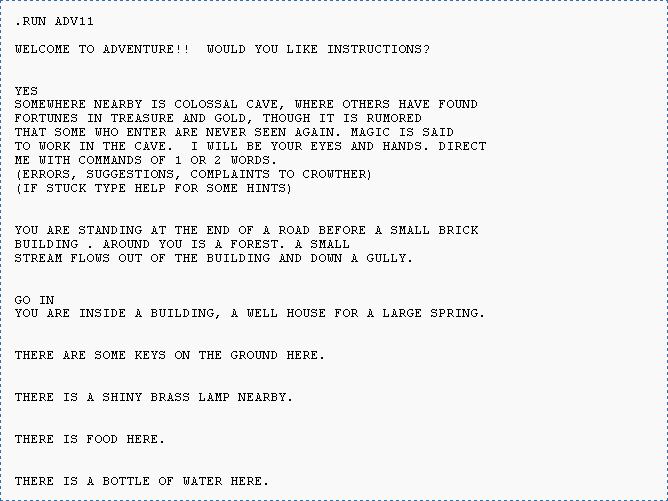
Will Crowther's Adventure

You haven't lived until you've died in MUD. -- The MUD1 Slogan.

Adventure, created in 1975 by Will Crowther on a DEC PDP-10 computer, was the first widely played adventure game. The game was significantly expanded in 1976 by Don Woods. Adventure contained many D&D features and references, including a computer controlled dungeon master.

Inspired by Adventure, a group of students at MIT, in the summer of 1977 wrote a game called Zork for the PDP-10. It became quite popular on the ARPANET. Zork was ported under the name Dungeon to FORTRAN by a programmer working at DEC in 1978.

In 1978 Roy Trubshaw, a student at Essex University in the UK, started working on a multi-user adventure game in the MACRO-10 assembly language for a DEC PDP-10. He named the game MUD (Multi-User Dungeon), in tribute to the Dungeon variant of Zork, which Trubshaw had greatly enjoyed playing. Trubshaw converted MUD to BCPL (the predecessor of C), before handing over development to Richard Bartle, a fellow student at Essex University, in 1980.

MUD, better known as Essex MUD and MUD1 in later years, ran on the Essex University network until late 1987.

The popularity of MUDs of the Essex University tradition escalated in the USA during the 1980s when affordable personal computers with 300 to 2400 bit/s modems enabled role-players to log into multi-line Bulletin Board Systems and online service providers such as CompuServe. During this time it was sometimes said that MUD stands for "Multi Undergraduate Destroyer" due to their popularity among college students and the amount of time devoted to them.

In 1987, Nihon Falcom's Yoshio Kiya, creator of the Dragon Slayer action role-playing games, expressed his idea for an online RPG "with a system that allows total freedom for the player. For example, despite it being a sword and sorcery world, the hero decides to do nothing and just quietly enjoy his life as a local baker in town. If everyone could take up different roles in some kind of computer networked game, I think it would be really fun."

In 1989, Yehuda Simmons published Avalon: The Legend Lives which has seen continued development and support ever since. Avalon, while not the first MUD, set the bar for imitators, with never-before-seen features such as an in-depth economic system, farming and labour mechanics, player-driven autonomous governments with ministers, barons and organization elections, a warfare conquest system featuring legions, battalions, trenches, minefields, barricades and fortifications, as well as thousands of unique player abilities and skills which formed the basis of Avalon's meritocratic PVP system based on skill-worth as opposed to the traditional level-based progression system favoured by many other games of this genre. Avalon's mission statement was to be the first fully developed roleplaying world - a life within a life using real-world systems to fully immerse players into the lives of the characters they created.

Many MUDs are still active and a number of influential MMORPG designers, such as Raph Koster, Brad McQuaid, Matt Firor, Mark Jacobs, Brian Green, and J. Todd Coleman, began as MUD developers and/or players. The history of MMORPGs grows directly out of the history of MUDs.

=== PLATO ===
Meanwhile, the PLATO system, an educational computer system based on mainframe computers with graphical terminals, was pioneering many areas of multiuser computer systems. By the middle of 1974, there were graphical multiplayer games such as Spasim, a space battle game which could support 32 users, and the Talkomatic multi-user chat system.

Oubliette, written by Jim Schwaiger, and published on the PLATO system predated MUD1 by about a year. It was so difficult that one could not play it alone: in order for players to survive, they had to run in groups. While Oubliette was a multi-player game, there was no persistence to the game world. Following it, also on PLATO, was a game called Moria written in 1975, copyright 1978. Again, players could run in parties but in this game it was also possible to effectively play while only running one character.

Another early PLATO game was Avatar, begun around 1977 and opened in 1979, written by Bruce Maggs, Andrew Shapira, and Dave Sides, all high school students using the PLATO system at the University of Illinois. This 2.5-D game was running on 512×512 plasma panels of the PLATO system, and groups of up to 15 players could enter the dungeon simultaneously and fight monsters as a team.

These games were graphical in nature and very advanced for their time, but were proprietary programs that were unable to spread beyond PLATO. Textual worlds, which typically ran on Unix, VMS, or DOS, were far more accessible to the public.

=== Early commercial development ===
The first commercial MMORPG (although what constitutes "massive" requires qualification when discussing mid-1980s mainframes) was Island of Kesmai designed by Kelton Flinn and John Taylor. This roguelike game became available in 1985 for $12.00 per hour via the CompuServe online service and supported up to one hundred players.

In early 1985, one of the first graphical online services (beaten to status as the first by Commodore's PlayNET by a matter of months) was Games Computers Play (GCP), a dial-in service for Atari 8-bit computers based in York, Pennsylvania. Users dialed in 300-baud or 1200-baud modem, and moved their avatar around an isometric virtual mallscape via joystick. They could chat privately and in virtual group chat rooms, exchange mail, and play several online multiplayer games by traveling to different doors. Most notably, one of these games, Lords of Space, was the first commercial graphical MMO, and featured a persistent universe in which an unlimited number of players traveled in armed spaceships, exploring planets to build facilities on and exploit for resources, which could in turn be sold to buy new ships and upgrade their ships' equipment. Players could run into each other and engage in combat. GCP was also notable for actively advertising the use of its text-chat rooms as a vehicle for playing remote role-playing game sessions.

Lucasfilm's Habitat was an early and technologically influential online role-playing game developed by Lucasfilm Games and made available as a beta test in 1986 by Quantum Link, an online service for the Commodore 64 computer and the corporate progenitor to America Online. It was initially created in 1985 by Randy Farmer and Chip Morningstar, who were given a "First Penguin Award" at the 2001 Game Developers Choice Awards for this innovative work, and was the first attempt at a large-scale commercial virtual community (Morningstar and Farmer 1990; Robinett 1994) that was graphically based. It ran from 1986 to 1988, after which it was closed down at the end of the pilot run. A sized-down incarnation but with vastly improved graphics (avatars became equipped with facial expressions, for example) was launched for general release as Club Caribe in January 1988.

The first graphical MMORPG (initially referred to as a Multi-user Dungeon (MUD)) was Neverwinter Nights by designer Don Daglow and programmer Cathryn Mataga (not to be confused with Neverwinter Nights by BioWare). "Neverwinter Nights" went live on AOL for PC owners in 1991 and ran through 1997. This project was personally championed and green-lighted by AOL President Steve Case. Both Club Caribe and Neverwinter Nights cost $6.00 per hour to play.

During the early-1990s, commercial use of the internet was limited by NSFNET acceptable use policies. Consequently, early online games like Legends of Future Past, Neverwinter Nights, Gemstone III, Dragon's Gate, and Federation relied heavily on proprietary services such as CompuServe, America Online, and GEnie for distribution.

Air Warrior was an early multiplayer game as players could battle each other flying virtual fighter planes. The game was first introduced in 1986 and ran on the GEnie network. In 1993 the game was revised to run over the internet.

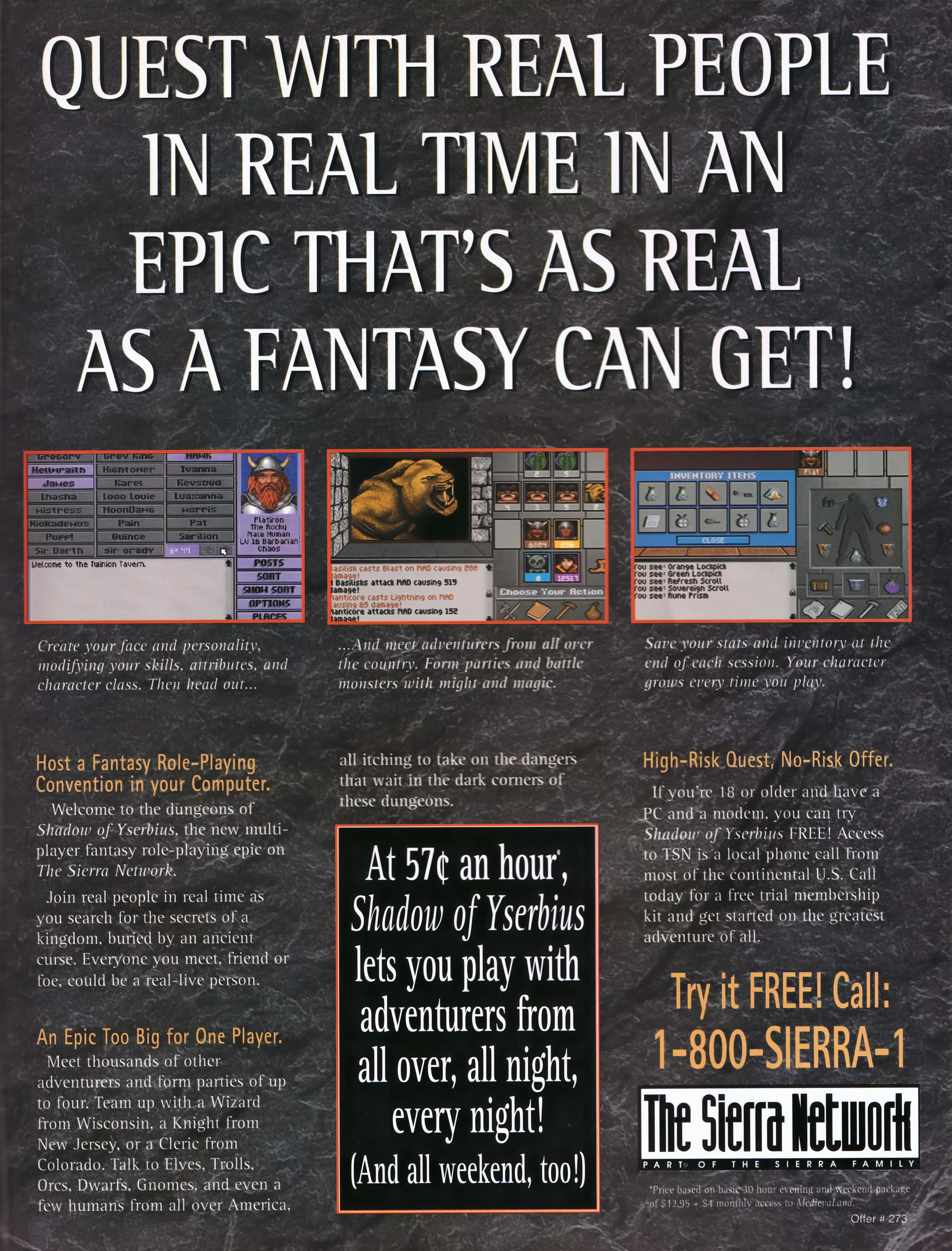
Magazine ad for The Shadow of Yserbius which required a monthly subscription to The Sierra Network.

Following Neverwinter Nights was The Shadow of Yserbius, an MMORPG on The Sierra Network (TSN), which ran from 1992 through 1996. The game was produced by Joe Ybarra. The Shadow of Yserbius was an hourly service, although it also offered unlimited service for $119.99 per month, until AT&T acquired TSN and rendered it strictly an hourly service. The name was then changed from TSN to the ImagiNation Network.

== Commercial MMORPGs on the Internet ==
As NSFNET restrictions were relaxed, traditional game companies and online services began deploying games on the internet. The first commercial text-based MMORPG to make this transition to the Internet from a proprietary network provider (CompuServe, in this case) was Legends of Future Past. Legends was also notable for being one of the first titles to have featured professional Game Masters who conducted online events.

The term MMORPG was coined by Richard Garriott, the creator of Ultima Online, in 1997. Prior to this, graphical online games were known as graphical MUDs or gMUDs. The term probably derives from "MMOG", which can be traced back to the 1995 E3 Convention, when Dale Addink used it to describe Confirmed Kill.

The Realm Online was another successful early Internet MMORPG, launched by Sierra Online. Although released just after Meridian 59, the beta was active several months before. The Realm Online had fully animated 2D graphics, both in and out of combat situations, which made it accessible to a wider audience compared to more text-based games or the graphical MUDs on which it was based. Also, its gameplay and interface were already familiar to those accustomed to the graphical adventure games earlier popularised by Sierra. Like many of its predecessors, The Realm Online only featured simple turn-based combat. However, it did feature a huge number (for the time) of visual character customization options. It, too, is still running.

Nexus: The Kingdom of the Winds, whose beta was released to Korean audiences in 1996 was one of the first MMORPGs. It is still an active game today with over 1000 subscribers.

Meridian 59, launched by 3DO in late 1996, was one of the first Internet MMORPGs. It was one of the first Internet games from a major publisher, one of the first to be covered in the major game magazines and the first MMPOG to introduce the flat monthly subscription fee. Perhaps most significantly, was its 3D engine, allowing players to experience the game world through the eyes of their characters. A cult following quickly grew for Meridian 59 that still exists today.

Tibia, launched by CipSoft in January 1997, started out as a hobby project by four students. The game's graphics have stayed largely the same with a 2D top-down perspective. Tibia predates many of the tropes popularized by World of Warcraft and is known for its depth, mysteries and secrets. The game is notable for its hardcore leveling curve with harsh death penalties. It still receives updates and is most popular in Poland and Brazil.

Ultima Online, Alpha testing in Jan 1996 and later released in September 1997, is now credited with popularizing the genre. It featured 3D isometric/third-person graphics, and was set in the already popular Ultima universe. It was also a more involved, complex game than many of its predecessors.

Two years after Ultima Online, The Fourth Coming was released, an MMORPG in 3D isometric. It was launched in France under the name La 4ème Prophétie and contributed to spread the MMORPG culture in Europe as one of the first graphical MMORPG. It became very popular through the website GOA until its close in 2001. This MMORPG featured a unique communication system. The game has lost its popularity, however it is still a subject of nostalgia for its old players and some servers continue to host players.

A lesser known MMORPG was launched, on the Mplayer network, in March 1998 called Underlight by Lyra Studios LLC. The game featured live action FPS combat in a 3D environment, an advancement system where players write quests for other players, and a unique faction system with fixed houses that are player run. Also notable was the game's rules required people to play in-character at all times and the game's rich story line. This game was similar to Meridian 59 and likewise has maintained a cult following to this day, recently being re-launched again in 2014 by another group of former players under a new company named KoiWare.

Meanwhile, commercial online gaming was becoming extraordinarily popular in South Korea. Nexus: The Kingdom of the Winds, designed by Jake Song, was commercially released in 1996 and eventually gained over one million subscribers. Song's next game, Lineage (1998), enjoyed even greater success gaining millions of subscribers in Korea and Taiwan. This helped to secure developer NCsoft's dominance in the global MMORPG market for several years. NCSoft has released Lineage 2, City of Heroes, Guild Wars, Exteel, and Aion: The Tower of Eternity. Recently, titles such as Blade & Soul and Guild Wars 2 were released between late 2011 to early 2012.

EverQuest, launched in March 1999 by Verant Interactive (a development venture inside Sony which was always closely aligned with the operating entity that became Sony Online Entertainment), surpassed Ultima Online in player count and success. It was the most commercially successful MMORPG in the United States for five years, and was the basis for 32 expansions (as of December 2025) and several derivative games.

In 1999, following Ultima Online and EverQuest, was another hit, Asheron's Call. Together, these three games are sometimes referred to as the original "big three" of the late 1990s.

== Second generation MMORPGs ==
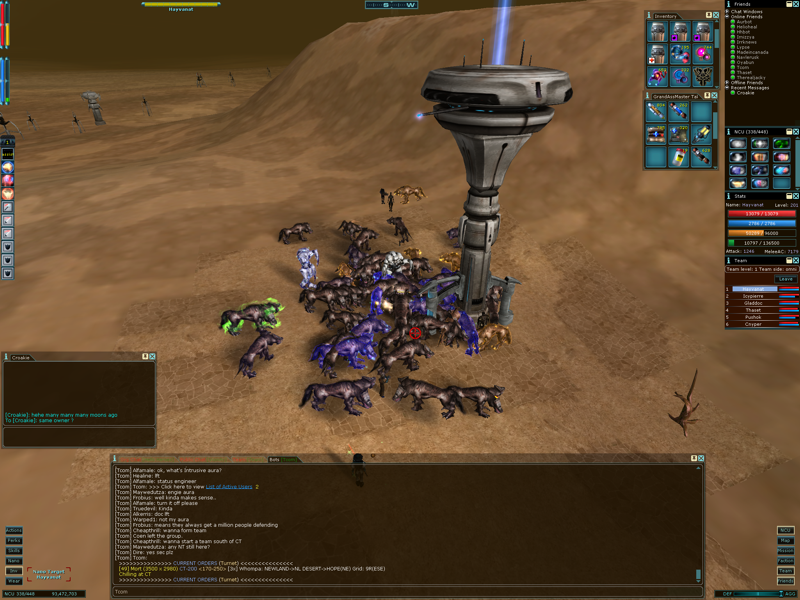
Anarchy Online is a 2001 massively multiplayer online role-playing game.

By the turn of the millennium, game companies were eager to capitalize on the new market. The concept of massively multiplayer online games expanded into new video game genres around this time, though RPGs, with their ability to "suck in" the player, were (and still are) the most financially promising.

The next generation of MMORPGs, following the "big three" of the previous decade, was to include the medieval PvP-oriented Dark Age of Camelot, the sci-fi Anarchy Online, and Ultima Online 2. Anarchy Online, released first in June 2001, was saddled with crippling technical problems upon its release, mostly due to an inability to handle the huge playerbase. Dark Age of Camelot launched smoothly four months later, introducing "Realm vs. Realm" PvP and other innovations, and quickly passed Ultima Online and Asheron's Call in popularity, and became EverQuest's main rival. Ultima Online 2 was cancelled by Electronic Arts in March 2001, as they had decided that the market was becoming saturated and that it would be more profitable to divert resources to the original Ultima Online. RuneScape by Jagex was also released in 2001. 2001 also saw MMORPGs move off of PCs and onto home consoles in a limited form with the release of Phantasy Star Online; however, due to platform limitations, it would not be until EverQuest Online Adventures release that 'massive' features found their way outside of non-combat areas on consoles.

2001 also saw the first fully 3D sci-fi space-ship MMORPG. Jumpgate: The Reconstruction Initiative (also Jumpgate or Jumpgate Classic and commonly abbreviated as JG or JGC) is an MMORPG in a science fiction setting for the PC, released in North America on September 25, 2001 by NetDevil (developer) and 3DO (publisher).

In 2002 the sprite-based Ragnarok Online, produced by Korean company Gravity Corp, was released. Though unknown to many Western players, the game took Asia by storm as Lineage had done. The publisher has claimed in excess of 25 million subscribers of the game, although this number is based upon a quantity of registered users (rather than active subscribers). 2002 also saw the release of MapleStory, another sprite-based title, which was completely free-to-play - instead of charging a monthly fee, it generated revenue by selling in-game "enhancements". MapleStory would go on to become a major player in the new market for free-to-play MMORPGs (generating huge numbers of registered accounts across its many versions), if it did not introduce the market by itself.

In September 2002, Earth & Beyond was released. Having been in development since 1997, this was the second 3D sci-fi space-ship based MMORPG. Earth and Beyond only lasted two years before being shut down by developer Westwood Studios' owners, Electronic Arts.

In November 2002, Final Fantasy XI by Square-Enix became the first MMOG to provide clients for different platforms using a single set of servers, in addition to being the first 'true' MMOG to appear on a video game console due to its initial release in Japan in May of the same year on the PlayStation 2. It would go on to provide a client for a third platform, the Xbox 360, in 2006.

In March 2003, Ubisoft launched their first MMORPG: Shadowbane. Shadowbane was notable for featuring no quests, and instead relying on player warfare to provide immersion. To support this goal it featured player-built, player-owned, and player-razed cities and capitals, and a system for player government.

Also in March 2003 Sony Online Entertainment launched EverQuest Online Adventures, a PlayStation 2 spin-off of the successful EverQuest MMO. This game was only accessible to PlayStation 2 players. The game shut down on the March 29, 2012 after nine years of full operations.

May 2003 saw the release of Eve Online, produced by CCP Games, which had players taking the role of spaceship pilots and had gameplay similar to the series Star Control. Though not the first space MMO (Microsoft Allegiance was the first space MMO and was released in 1999), Eve was able to achieve lasting success. One of the reasons for its success may have been the game's design, in which all subscribers play in one shared universe as a result the natural partitioning of the game universe into solar systems connected by stargates. This partitioning allows the world to be divided up in such a way that one or more solar systems run on different servers, while still maintaining a single coherent world.

In June 2003, The Walt Disney Company launched its first MMORPG, Toontown Online, for open release. Unlike a lot of other first and second generation MMOs at the time, Toontown was unique from the rest because it specifically focused on reaching audiences of children and families, while most MMOs of the generation appealed to older players. Because of this, it is often entitled the first MMO for families. With Toontown's unique playing style, players took on the roles of classic cartoon characters, which were heavily based on the world in the 1988 Touchstone Pictures film, Who Framed Roger Rabbit. The objective of the game was simple. One had to save the city of Toontown from evil business robots, known as Cogs. While a lot of the game was based on leveling up from side activities, the combat features of the game took precedence. The weapons of the game that lured off Cogs were known as Gags, unique objects found in cartoons and comedic nature (such as a flower pot or TNT). According to the storyline, "Cogs just can't take a joke!" After a good 10 years of the game being targeted to all kinds of audiences, Disney decided to close it in order to shift its development towards another virtual world experience known as Club Penguin. Thousands of community members are still actively playing in community servers that have risen in the wake of its closing.

In October 2003, Lineage II (NCsoft's sequel to Lineage) became the latest MMORPG to achieve huge success across Asia. It received the Presidential Award at the 2003 Korean Game awards, and is now the second most popular MMORPG in the world. As of the first half of 2005 Lineage II counted over 2.25 million subscribers worldwide, with servers in Japan, China, North America, Taiwan, and Europe, once the popularity of the game had surged in the West.

2003 also saw the appearance of Second Life. While not primarily a role playing game, it is clearly multiplayer and online, and it is used as a platform where people construct role playing games based on Gor, Star Trek, vampires, and other genres.

In April 2004, NCSoft produced another significant title, City of Heroes. It introduced several major innovations in gameplay and also featured an extreme number of possible visual character appearances, and its comic-book superhero theme made it stand out.

== Current-generation MMORPGs ==
=== 2000s ===
The most recent generation of MMORPGs, based on arbitrary standards of graphics, gameplay, and popularity, is said to have launched in November 2004 with Sony Online Entertainment's EverQuest II and Blizzard Entertainment's World of Warcraft (WoW). At the time, Sony expected to dominate the market, based on the success of the first EverQuest, and decided to offer a flat monthly rate to play all of their MMORPGs including EverQuest, EverQuest II, and Star Wars Galaxies, to keep from competing with itself. While EverQuest II was a commercial success as predicted, World of Warcraft immediately overtook all of these games upon release, and indeed became so popular that it dwarfed all previous monthly-fee MMORPGs. The closest MMORPG to World of Warcraft was, in terms of paying subscribers, RuneScape with more than one million subscribers and even more free players. RuneScape was also the world's largest free MMORPG, though it received less media attention than WoW. With the release of these newer games, subscriptions began to decline for many older MMORPGs, even the year-old Lineage II, and in particular Everquest. The current MMORPG market has World of Warcraft in a position similar to the position of Dungeons & Dragons in the tabletop RPG market, with both games' market share being greater than 50% of the overall market.

In August 2005 Sony Online Entertainment acquired The Matrix Online, and the game was shut down at 11:59pm, 31 July 2009. It is one of the first games Sony terminated along with Free Realms on March 31, 2014.

On April 25 2005, ArenaNet (a subsidiary of NCSoft) successfully launched Guild Wars, introducing a new financial model which might have been partly responsible for the game's success. Though definitely an online RPG, and technically having a persistent world (despite most of the game's content being instanced), it requires only a one-time purchasing fee. It was also designed to be "winnable", more or less, as developers would not profit from customers' prolonged playtime. Other differences compared to traditional MMORPGs include strictly PvP-only areas, a relatively short playtime requirement to access end-game content, instant world travel, and strategic PvP. The game is designed around the max level cap of level 20, so players will not run into the level-spreading problem when grouping. For these differences it was termed instead a "Competitive Online Role-Playing Game" (CORPG) by its developers. With five million games purchased as of April '09, Guild Wars was still continuously profitable (due to several stand-alone games) but was still not viewed by some as a serious competitor to WoW in terms of profit and number of players. However, the alternative nature of the payment system in Guild Wars meant that the game did not aim to "compete" with WoW rather than exist alongside it, and in that sense it could still be considered a large success.

There was also significant competition (and potential for profit) among free-to-play MMORPGs. A few of the most successful of these were Silkroad Online (launched 2004) by the publisher Joymax, the 3D sprite based MMORPG Flyff by Aeonsoft, Rappelz by nFlavor, (with Aeonsoft and nFlavor merging in 2010 to become Gala Lab Corp) Perfect World by Beijing Perfect World, the 2D scrolling MMORPG MapleStory by Wizet and finally the free-to-play converted Shadowbane by Ubisoft. Most of these games generate revenue by selling in-game "enhancements", and due to their free nature have accumulated huge numbers of registered accounts over the years, with a majority of them from East Asia. On July 1, 2009, Ubisoft shut down the Shadowbane servers.

Many of the most recent big-budget contributions to the market have focused on giving players visually stunning graphics. In 2007, The Lord of the Rings Online: Shadows of Angmar (LOTRO) was one of the first of these to meet with commercial success, followed by the problematic 2008 launch of Age of Conan: Hyborian Adventures and the Player versus player focused Warhammer Online: Age of Reckoning. Much like LOTRO, many of the games in development with big expectations have multi-media tie-ins, such as Star Wars: The Old Republic (launched 2011) and Star Trek Online (launched 2010). In mid-2013, WoW was one of the most played games in North America, and the most subscribed to MMORPG worldwide, with a total of over 7 million subscriptions.

=== 2010s ===
In 2010, Pocket Legends, the first cross-platform MMORPG for mobile platforms was launched for iOS and later that year for Android. In contrast to PC and console MMORPGs and despite the game's success, development was short lived. Since 2012, no new expansions are released as the player base has shrunk due to the company's focus on the launch of new titles.

In 2014, WildStar that is developed by Carbine Studios was released by NCSOFT was a big budget subscription-based game that later moved to a free-to-play model. In November 2018, Carbine Studios and WildStar were shut down for good by NCSOFT.

By December 2016, Turbine was no longer involved with the development of MMORPG's, instead to focus on a future of mobile development. Both The Lord of the Rings Online and Dungeons & Dragons Online continued development under a newly formed studio by the name of Standing Stone Games, with game staff, servers and services moving from Turbine to the new studio. As part of this transition, Daybreak Games became the new publisher, taking over from Warner Brothers. Asheron's Call and its sequel closed on January 31, 2017 as result of the events.

=== "The Big Five" ===
"The Big Five" is a loose term used amongst game critics and reviewers to group the five most popular, successful or active MMORPGs (depending on criteria) of any given period. The games that are commonly considered members of "The Big Five" slowly shift over time, as some lose active players while others gain more. In October and December 2020, Massively Overpowered contributors Eliot Lefebvre and Carlo Lacsina stated that at the time, "The Big Five" were Black Desert Online (BDO), Final Fantasy XIV (FF14), The Elder Scrolls Online (ESO), World of Warcraft (WoW), and Guild Wars 2 (GW2).

Reviewer Bio Break, who in February 2019 included Star Wars: The Old Republic (SWTOR) rather BDO, questioned whether "The Big Five" were properly defined as a group, stating that 'these titles aren't necessarily the most popular or successful, there is just a perception that they are so,' and claiming that RuneScape 'doesn't get that much respect among the wider community'. Similarly, critic Josh Strife Hayes listed RuneScape rather than BDO amongst 'the five major games that dominated the MMO landscape in the last few years' in July 2021, when Final Fantasy XIV overtook World of Warcraft (which had been 'an absolute dominant force' until then). Although players and observers had speculated for over a decade that this or that game would eventually 'dethrone' or 'kill' WoW by attaining even more popularity, instead many WoW players just gradually left the game out of disappointment, with only some switching to its main competitors.

== See also ==
- List of MMORPGs
- History of online games
- MOG
- MMORPG
- Virtual world
