= Arcane Legends =

2012 video game

- Developer(s): Spacetime Studios
- Publisher(s): Spacetime Studios
- Series: Legends
- Platform(s): iOS, Android, Google Chrome, Microsoft Windows
- Release: 2012
- Genre(s): hack and slash
- Mode(s): multiplayer

Arcane Legends is a free-to-play hack and slash multiplayer mobile game originally launched in 2012 by Spacetime Studios for Microsoft Windows, iOS, Android, and Google Chrome. It is the fourth title in Spacetime Studios' "Legends" series, following Pocket Legends, Star Legends, and Dark Legends.

== Gameplay ==
Players can select a class from three options: Warrior, Rogue, or Mage. They then choose from three starting pets: Precious, Timber, or Guapo. The Warrior has the most health and armor; the Rogue has lower defenses but higher attack and dexterity; while the Mage has the most mana and supports other classes. Each class has a unique set of weapons it can use. Weapons can be purchased with Gold in the Auction, platinum in Store or found in chests that are dropped by enemies. The players can change outfits (vanities) that they find during the adventures or through the auction house.

Pets increase the stats and unleash arcane abilities. They can be found inside of eggs dropped by mobs, chests, or purchased through the store with the in-game currency. There are three modes to engage in battle with other players: Team Death Match, Capture the Flag and Free for All.

== Reception ==
The game received generally positive reception around the time of its initial launch in 2012. The game starts players with armor, and some boots. As of April 2022, Arcane Legends has a rating of 4.2 stars on the Apple App Store. The game has 968 total reviews.
