= Star Trek Timelines =

2016 video game

- Developers: Disruptor Beam; Wicked Realm Games
- Publishers: Disruptor Beam (iOS), Tilting Point (Android)
- Engine: Unity 5
- Platforms: Facebook Platform, iOS, Android
- Release: January 14, 2016
- Genre: Strategy
- Mode: Multiplayer

Star Trek Timelines is a strategy role playing video game developed by Disruptor Beam for iOS and Android devices, Facebook, Facebook Gameroom, the Amazon Store, and Steam. On March 4, 2020 Tilting Point acquired the game from Disruptor Beam and created a new studio Wicked Realm Games to support the title. The player is the captain of a ship and can form their ship's crew from characters from any era of Star Trek, while steering the fate of the galaxy through diplomacy, science and force of arms. The game passed over a decade of continuous online operations in January 2026.

== Gameplay ==
Set after the events of Star Trek Nemesis and Star Trek: Voyager's series finale, Star Trek Timelines begins as the player captains their first starship command to investigate an unknown temporal anomaly. Upon arriving at the anomaly, the player meets Q, who immediately explains that a full-on temporal crisis has begun throwing people, places, and objects from other timelines (including the Mirror Universe) into this one.

Star Trek Timelines lets players recruit characters from all eras of the Star Trek TV series, including The Original Series, The Animated Series, The Next Generation, Deep Space Nine, Voyager, Enterprise, Discovery, Short Treks, Picard, Lower Decks, and Strange New Worlds as well as the Star Trek movies, comics, novels, and non-canon sources. Players take on the role of Captain, in command of their first starship (a Constellation class starship.) Soon, players must recruit crew and build starships from across the timelines in order to aid Q by sending crew on Away Missions, engaging in Starship Battles, and completing main missions to progress the story and choose which game factions take further control of a galaxy in chaos.

The players are also able to form in-game groups called "Fleets" and "Squadron" sub units that are ranked in weekend events and collaboratively upgrade "Starbases" to provide shared bonuses.

=== Away missions ===
One of the primary ways to progress in the game (including Starship Battles) an Away Mission is when the player sends a team of 3 characters out to complete a challenge. Each step of an Away Mission will require a character with the appropriate skill level and proficiency: diplomatic, scientific, medical, engineering, security, and command. Certain characters will even be able to unlock special steps on an Away Mission for rare rewards. Each Away Mission has three levels of difficulty: normal, elite, and epic. Common and uncommon characters are able to participate in special away missions called 'Cadet Challenges' to earn different currencies in the game.

=== Starship battles ===
Starship battles are described as "real-time conflicts between two starships and their respective crew". Before a starship battle, the player assigns 1-5 characters to a starship's battle station. Each character, when placed in a battle station, is able to temporarily increase the output of a ship. Currently, this is represented by three core stats: Damage, Accuracy, and Evasion. Players can collect schematics to build more ships to take into battle. The gameplay of the starship battles involves 3D combat, Jon Radoff stating: "We wanted to authentically and gorgeously portray all the things you would see out the window of a starship".

=== Credits, merits, and dilithium ===
Players can earn new crew and starships by playing the game or purchasing packs with real money. Star Trek Timelines uses dilithium as a premium currency. For in-game earned currency, players receive credits, merits, honor, and tickets, the first two being used to purchase packs from the Time Portal as well as items from the game's many Star Trek factions, such as the Dominion or the Terran Empire. Honor is used to purchase special crew and items (such as Honorable Citations), many of which are unobtainable any other way. Tickets are used to play Cadet Challenges and Arena Battles, and they refill daily.

== Development ==
Disruptor Beam approached CBS about a Star Trek game when they had been developing Game of Thrones: Ascent for a year. Jon Radoff, CEO of Disruptor Beam, described the process of licensing Star Trek as "very competitive". Officially announced in April 2014, Star Trek Timelines is a 3D/2D game built in Unity 5. Its first live demo was at PAX East 2015, and the first playable tutorial experience was later debuted at Star Trek Las Vegas 2015.

On July 20, 2015 Disruptor Beam announced a partnership with John de Lancie for Star Trek Timelines. His involvement includes working with the design team and writers, as well as reprising his role as Q by providing in-game voice acting.

The game was ported to Facebook in December 2016.

Material based on Star Trek: Discovery was added after the series' debut.

== Reception ==
Star Trek Timelines has an aggregate rating of 4.1 on the Google Play store, and was selected as an Editor's Choice recipient. On the App Store, it has a rating of 4.5. An early review by Gamezebo regarded Star Trek Timelines as a "labor of love" for Disruptor Beam, but cautioned that the game was buggy at this stage, and criticising the battles as largely running themselves. A reviewer for Kotaku negatively compared Star Trek Timelines to Star Wars: Galaxy of Heroes, criticising the energy system used in gameplay. A reviewer for VentureBeat described Star Trek: Timelines as the "best Star Trek game" in at least a decade, highlighting the diversity of characters available, that the missions felt similar to Star Trek episodes, and the spaceship battles. As a negative, he stated that buying expansion packs of characters and ships could get expensive. A reviewer for Pocket Tactics found the gameplay "a bit light", and the free-to-play currencies in the game as "convoluted". As of March 2016, Star Trek Timelines had been downloaded a million times. Golem.de enjoyed the exciting story, beautiful appearance and the use of characters from all versions of Star Trek, but describes the game as being based on the pay-to-win principle, saying "The game uses virtually any situation to encourage the players to buy virtual items." (Original quote: "Das Spiel nutzt praktisch jede Situation, um den Spieler zum Kauf von virtuellen Gegenständen zu animieren.") Meg Stivison described the concept of the game as being like fan fiction, and found the time paradox conceit explained various aspects of the plot well. Stivison criticised the need to repeat each mission several times to earn the correct item, saying that eventually "all the fanfictiony fun is gone". However, Stivison summed up the game as "super fun".

In 2020, Screen Rant ranked Timelines as the sixth best Star Trek game.
