= History of online games =

Online games are video games played over a computer network. The evolution of these games parallels the evolution of computers and computer networking, with new technologies improving the essential functionality needed for playing video games on a remote server. Many video games have an online component, allowing players to play against or cooperatively with players across a network around the world.

== Background of technologies ==
The first video and computer games, such as NIMROD (1951), OXO (1952), and Spacewar! (1962), were for one or two players sitting at a single computer, which was being used only to play the game. Later in the 1960s, computers began to support time-sharing, which allowed multiple users to share the use of a computer simultaneously. Systems of computer terminals were created, allowing users to operate the computer from a different room from where the computer was housed. Soon after, modem links further expanded this range so that users did not have to be in the same building as the computer; terminals could connect to their host computers via dial-up or leased telephone lines. With the increased remote access, host-based games were created, in which users on remote systems connected to a central computer to play single-player, and soon after, multiplayer games.

Later, in the 1970s, packet-based computer networking technology began to mature. Between 1973 and 1975, Xerox PARC developed local area networks based on Ethernet. Additionally, the wide area network ARPANET further developed from its 1969 roots, led to the creation of the Internet on January 1, 1983. These LANs and WANs allowed for network games, where the game created and received network packets; systems located across LANs or the Internet could run games with each other in peer-to-peer or client–server models.

== PLATO ==
In the 1960s, Rick Bloome implemented SpaceWar! as a two-player game on PLATO.

In the early 1970s, the PLATO time-sharing system, created by the University of Illinois and Control Data Corporation, allowed students at several locations to use online lessons in one of the earliest systems for computer-aided instruction. In 1972, PLATO IV terminals with new graphics capabilities were introduced, and students started using this system to create multiplayer games. By 1978, PLATO had multiplayer interactive graphical dungeon crawls, air combat (Airfight), tank combat, space battles (Empire and Spasim), with features such as interplayer messaging, persistent game characters, and team play for at least 32 simultaneous players.

== Networked host-based systems ==
A key goal of early network systems such as ARPANET and JANET was to allow users of "dumb" text-based terminals attached to one host computer (or, later, to terminal servers) to interactively use programs on other host computers. This meant that games on those systems were accessible to users in many different locations by the use of programs such as telnet.

Most of the early host-based games were single-player, and frequently originated and were primarily played at universities. A sizable proportion was written on DEC-20 mainframes, as those had a strong presence in the university market. Games such as The Oregon Trail (1971), Colossal Cave Adventure (1976), and Star Trek (1972) were very popular, with several or many students each playing their own copy of the game at once, time-sharing the system with each other and users running other programs.

Eventually, though, multiplayer host-based games on networked computers began to be developed. One of the most important of these was MUD (1978), a program that spawned a genre and had significant input into the development of concepts of shared world design, having a formative impact on the evolution of MMORPGs. In 1984, MAD debuted on BITNET; this was the first MUD fully accessible from a worldwide computer network. During its two-year existence, 10% of the sites on BITNET connected to it. In 1988, another BITNET MUD named MUDA appeared. It lasted for five years, before going offline due to the retirement of the computers it ran on.

In the summer of 1973, Maze War was first written at NASA's Ames Research Center in California by high school summer interns using Imlac PDS-1 computers. The authors added two-player capability by connecting two IMLAC computers with serial cables. Since two computers were involved, as opposed to "dumb terminals", they could use formatted protocol packets to send information to each other, so this could be considered the first peer-to-peer computer video game. It could also be called the first first-person shooter.

In 1983, Gary Tarolli wrote a flight simulator demonstration program for Silicon Graphics workstation computers. In 1984, networking capabilities were added by connecting two machines using serial cables just as had been done with the IMLACs for Mazewar at NASA eleven years earlier. Next, XNS support was added, allowing multiple stations to play over an Ethernet, just as with the Xerox version of Mazewar. In 1986, UDP support was added (port 5130), making SGI Dogfight the first game to ever use the Internet protocol suite. The packets used, though, were broadcast packets, which meant that the game was limited to a single network segment; it could not cross a router, and thus could not be played across the Internet. Around 1989, IP multicast capability was added, and the game became playable between any compatible hosts on the Internet, assuming that they had multicast access (which was quite uncommon).

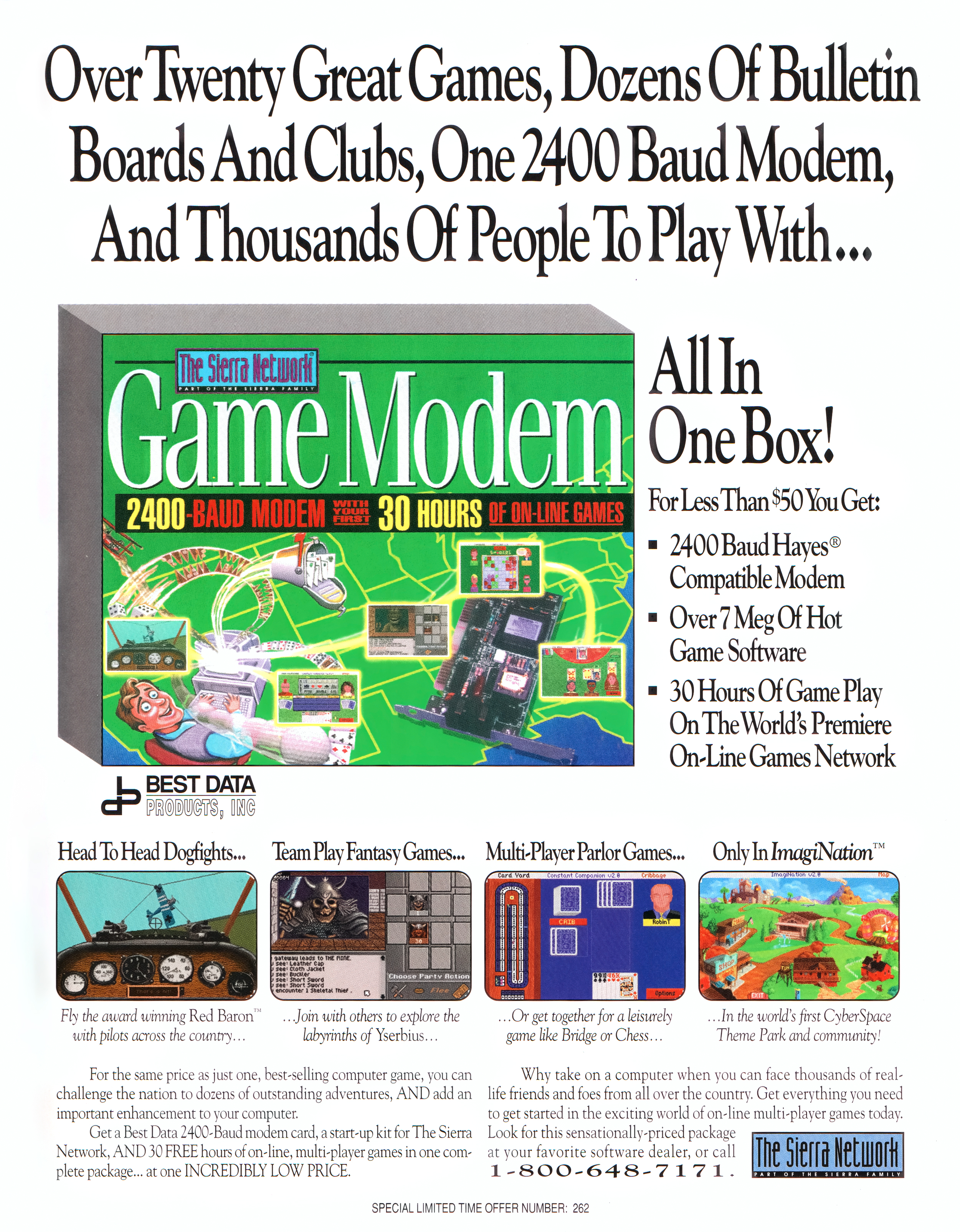
Magazine advertisement for The Sierra Network's starter kit, offering a trial subscription along with a 2400 baud modem

In 1989, Sierra On-Line launched The Sierra Network, fully rolling it out in the US by 1991. As an MS-DOS-based platform, it was groundbreaking as the first subscription service fully dedicated to online gaming. It featured customizable avatars and offered a variety of games under a monthly fee, setting a precedent for modern online gaming communities.

In May 1993, Sega of Japan demonstrated an online version of arcade OutRunners, allowing up to eight players to play the game across two different cities in Japan. It was the first online arcade game to be demonstrated, with two separate OutRunner four-player cabinets connected in Tokyo and Osaka via an Integrated Services Digital Network (ISDN) operated by Nippon Telegraph and Telephone (NTT). Sega announced plans for a Japanese release in July 1993. A month later in June 1993, AT&T announced plans with Sega of America to introduce a similar online console gaming system for the Sega Genesis.

== X Window System games ==
In 1986, MIT and DEC released the X Window System, which provided two important capabilities in terms of game development. Firstly, it provided a widely deployed graphics system for workstation computers on the Internet. A number of workstation graphics systems existed, including Bell Labs' BLIT, SGI's IRIS GL, Carnegie Mellon's Andrew Project, and Sun's NeWS, but X managed over time to secure cross-platform dominance, becoming available for systems from nearly all workstation manufacturers, and coming from MIT, had particular strength in the academic arena. Since Internet games were being written mostly by college students, this was critical.

Secondly, X had the capability of using computers as thin clients, allowing a personal workstation to use a program that was actually being run on a much more powerful server computer exactly as if the user were sitting at the server computer. While remote control programs such as VNC allow similar capabilities, X incorporates it at the operating system level, allowing for much more tightly integrated functionality than these later solutions provide; multiple applications running on different servers can display individual windows. For example, a word processor running on one server could have two or three windows open while a mail reader running on the workstation itself, and a game running on yet another server could each display their own windows, and all applications would be using native graphics calls.

This meant that starting in the summer of 1986, a class of games began to be developed which relied on a fast host computer running the game and "throwing" X display windows, using personal workstation computers to remotely display the game and receive user input. Since X can use multiple networking systems, games based on remote X displays are not Internet-only games; they can be played over DECnet and other non-TCP/IP network stacks.

=== Xtrek ===
The first of these remote display games was Xtrek. Based on a PLATO system game, Empire, Xtrek is a 2D multiplayer space battle game loosely set in the Star Trek universe. This game could be played across the Internet, probably the first graphical game that could do so, a few months ahead of the X version of Maze War. Importantly, however, the game itself was not aware that it was using a network. In a sense, it was a host-based game, because the program only ran on a single computer, and knew about the X Window System, and the window system took care of the networking: essentially one computer displaying on several screens.

=== Fully network-aware games ===
The X version of Maze War, on the other hand, was peer-to-peer and used the network directly, with a copy of the program running on each computer in the game, instead of only a single copy running on a server. Netrek (originally called Xtrek II) was a fully network-aware client–server rewrite of Xtrek. Other remote X display-based games include xtank, xconq, xbattle and XPilot (1991). By 1989 Simson Garfinkel reported that on MIT's Project Athena, "Games like 'X-tank' and 'X-trek' let students at different workstations command tanks and starships, fire missiles at each other as fast as they can hit the buttons on their mice, and watch the results on their graphics displays". Observers estimated that up to one third of Athena usage was for games.

== Commercial timesharing services ==
As time-sharing technology matured, it became practical for companies with excess capacity on their expensive computer systems to sell that capacity. Service bureaus such as Tymshare (founded 1966) dedicated to selling time on a single computer to multiple customers sprang up. The customers were typically businesses that did not have the need or money to purchase and manage their own computer systems.

In 1979, two time-sharing companies, The Source and CompuServe, began selling access to their systems to individual consumers and small business; this was the beginning of the era of online service providers. While an initial focus of service offerings was the ability for users to run their own programs, over time applications including online chat, electronic mail and BBSs and games became the dominant uses of the systems. For many people, these, rather than the academic and commercial systems available only at universities and technical corporations, were their first exposure to online gaming.

In 1984, CompuServe debuted Islands of Kesmai, the first commercial multiplayer online role playing game. Islands of Kesmai used scrolling text (ASCII graphics) on the screen to draw maps of player location, depict movement, and so on; the interface is considered Roguelike. At some point, graphical overlay interfaces could be downloaded, putting a slightly more glitzy face on the game. Playing cost was the standard CompuServe connection fee of the time, $6 per hour with a 300 baud modem, $12 for a 1200 baud modem; the game processed one command every 10 seconds, which equates to 1 2/3 cents per command.

The LINKS was an online network launched for the MSX in Japan in 1986. It featured several graphical multiplayer online games, including T&E Soft's Daiva Dr. Amandora and Super Laydock, Telenet Japan's Girly Block, and Bothtec's Dires. It also featured several downloadable games, including Konami's A1 Grand Prix and Network Rally.

Habitat was the first attempt at a large-scale commercial virtual community that was graphically based. Habitat was not a 3D environment and did not incorporate immersion techniques. It is considered a forerunner of the modern MMORPGs and was quite unlike other online communities (i.e. MUDs and MOOs with text-based interfaces) of the time. Habitat had a GUI and a large userbase of consumer-oriented users, and those elements in particular have made it a much-cited project. When Habitat was shut down in 1988, it was succeeded by a scaled-down but a more sophisticated game called Club Caribe.

In 1987, Nintendo president Hiroshi Yamauchi partnered with Nomura Securities on the development of the Family Computer Network System for the Family Computer in Japan. Led by Masayuki Uemura, Nintendo Research & Development 2 developed the modem hardware, and Nomura Securities developed the client and server software and the information database. Five network-enabled games were developed for the system, including a graphical, competitive online multiplayer version of Yamauchi's favorite classic, Go.

In 1987, Kesmai (the company which developed Islands of Kesmai) released Air Warrior on GEnie. It was a graphical flight simulator/air combat game, initially using wire frame graphics, and could run on Apple Macintosh, Atari ST, or Commodore Amiga computers. Over time, Air Warrior was added to other online services, including Delphi, CRIS, CompuServe, America Online, Earthlink, GameStorm and CompuLink. Over time, Kesmai produced many improved versions of the game. In 1997, a backport from Windows to the Macintosh was made available as an open beta on the Internet. In 1999, Kesmai was purchased by Electronic Arts, which started running the game servers itself. The last Air Warrior servers were shut down on December 7, 2001.

In 1988, Federation debuted on Compunet. It was a text-based online game, focused around the interstellar economy of the galaxy in the distant future. Players work their way up a series of ranks, each of which has a slightly more rewarding and interesting but difficult job attached, which culminates in the ownership of one's own "duchy", a small solar system. After some time on GEnie, in 1995 Federation moved to AOL. AOL made online games free in 1996, dropping surcharges to play, and the resulting load caused it to drop online game offerings entirely. IBGames, creators of Federation, started offering access to the game through its own website, making it perhaps the first game to transition off of an online service provider. IBGames kept the game operational until 2005 after most of the player base transitioned to the sequel, 2003's Federation II.

In 1990, Sega launched the online multiplayer gaming service Sega Meganet for the Mega Drive (Genesis) video game console. Sega continued to provide online gaming services for its later consoles, including the Sega NetLink service for the Sega Saturn and the SegaNet service for the Dreamcast. In 1995, Nintendo released the Satellaview, a satellite modem for the Super Famicom in Japan only after partnering up with St.GIGA, that gave the console online multiplayer gaming. In 1999, Nintendo released an add-on for the Nintendo 64 called the 64DD in Japan only, which offered Internet through a now-defunct dedicated online service for e-commerce, online gaming, and media sharing. The late 1990s saw an explosion of MMORPGs, including Nexus: The Kingdom of the Winds (1996), Ultima Online (1997), Lineage (1998), and EverQuest (1999).

In 2000, Sony introduced online multiplayer to the PlayStation 2. It was the first time of Sony doing so, and like many major consoles to come, it became a norm in the industry. In 2001, Nintendo introduced online multiplayer to the GameCube using an add-on called a Broadband Adapter and Modem Adapter. It, however, came dead last in competing with the likes of the upcoming Xbox and the now icon of modern gaming, the PlayStation 2, both in sales and online impact. Later on, in 2001, Microsoft released the Xbox, which by using Xbox Live, offered online multiplayer and other Internet capabilities to the console and continued doing so for its later consoles, the Xbox 360 and the Xbox One. In 2006, Nintendo released the Wii, which offered online multiplayer gaming and other Internet capabilities over Nintendo Wi-Fi Connection and WiiConnect24, respectively. Both services were shut down on May 20, 2014, along with online capabilities of any games that utilize the feature, such as Mario Kart Wii (2008). The same year the Wii hit store shelves, rival Sony introduced its new console to add to its line of industry icons, the PlayStation 3 which used the brand new PlayStation Network (PSN) for online multiplayer gaming and other Internet capabilities to the system, and continued doing so for later consoles such as the PlayStation 4. In 2012, Nintendo made a successor to the dying Nintendo Wi-Fi Connection involving their next-gen console, the Wii U, and its handheld counterpart, the Nintendo 3DS, by creating the Nintendo Network to continue on its online multiplayer and Internet capabilities, in order to compete against Microsoft's Xbox Live and Sony's PlayStation Network. Nintendo's latest console, the Nintendo Switch, does offer online play via Nintendo Network.

== See also ==
- History of arcade video games
- History of massively multiplayer online games
- History of mobile games
- History of video games
- Online game
- Multiplayer video game
