= Jeff Kurtenacker =

- Born: 7 September 1976 (age 49)
- Origin: Green Bay, Wisconsin
- Occupation: composer

Jeff Kurtenacker (born September 7, 1976) is a music composer for video games, television, radio, and film. He was lead composer on the 2014 MMO WildStar by Carbine Studios, and co-composer on the major release Pirates of the Burning Sea by Flying Labs Software, released in January 2008, and worked on World of Warcraft and Warcraft 3 as a choral arranger and copyist. He lives in Southern California.

== Early life ==
Kurtenacker was born and raised in Green Bay, WI. In 2001 he moved to Los Angeles to complete the Film Scoring program at UCLA Extension. He also has a degree in Music Composition and Audio/Video Technology from Lawrence University in Appleton, WI.

== Work and projects ==
=== Video game scores ===
- WildStar by Carbine Studios
- Mystery Case Files: Dire Grove (contracted by SomaTone Interactive Audio)
- Hidden Expedition: Devil's Triangle (contracted by SomaTone Interactive Audio)
- Campfire Legends (contracted by SomaTone Interactive Audio)
- Avenue Flo - PlayFirst (contracted by SomaTone Interactive Audio)
- Cate West 2: The Velvet Keys (contracted by SomaTone Interactive Audio)
- Clockwork Man (contracted by SomaTone Interactive Audio)
- Karaoke Revolution: American Idol Encore 2 -Horn/String Arranging; Organ/Keys MIDI programming (contracted by SomaTone Interactive Audio)
- Warriors Game - HistoryChannel.com (contracted by SomaTone Interactive Audio)
- Ben Stein - It's Trivial iPhone game (contracted by SomaTone Interactive Audio)
- IGOR - The Game (contracted by SomaTone Interactive Audio)
- Forgotten Riddles 2 (contracted by SomaTone Interactive Audio)
- Age of Mythology for Nintendo DS (contracted by SomaTone Interactive Audio)
- Assault Heroes 2 (XBLA game) - (cinematics only) (contracted by SomaTone Interactive Audio)
- Universal's The Simpsons Ride website mini games music (contracted by SomaTone Interactive Audio)
- Pirates of the Burning Sea
- Warcraft III - Vocal Orchestrations and Copywork
- World of Warcraft - Copywork; some arranging
- Karaoke Revolution: American Idol Encore - Horn/String Arranging; Organ/Keys MIDI programming (contracted by SomaTone Interactive Audio)
- Mystery Case Files: Madame Fate (contracted by SomaTone Interactive Audio)
- Cate West: The Vanishing Files (contracted by SomaTone Interactive Audio)
- Sunset Studio Deluxe (contracted by SomaTone Interactive Audio)
- Mystery London (contracted by SomaTone Interactive Audio)
- Hotel Mahjong (contracted by SomaTone Interactive Audio)
- Born Punk
- The Expanse: A Telltale Series (Composer and Audio lead)

=== Film/Television scores ===
- The Girl Who Wore Freedom (directed by Christian Taylor)
- For the Good of the People (directed by Dana Jones)
- The Navigator. A short film by Carlo Treviso
- Tonic: The Legend of Wooly Creek

=== Radio/TV commercials ===
- Rich Brother, Rich Sister (book) radio ad
- The Seven Sins: The Tyrant Ascending (book) radio and TV ad
- The Romanov Bride (book) radio ad
- SeaVegg TV infomercial
