= Star Legend =

Star Legend or Star Legends may refer to:

- Star Legend (ship)
- Star Legends: The Blackstar Chronicles, a mobile game
- "Star Legend", an episode of the 1977 television series Space Academy
