= Rails Across America =

2001 video game

- Developer: Flying Lab Software
- Publisher: Strategy First
- Designers: Paul Canniff; Russell Williams
- Platform: Windows
- Release: NA: September 18, 2001; EU: December 2001
- Genre: Business simulation
- Modes: Single-player, multiplayer

Rails Across America is a railroad simulation game released in late 2001 by developer Flying Lab Software and publisher Strategy First. It received generally positive reviews. Though no official expansions have been released, a rudimentary map-editing tool was made available to the player community.

== Gameplay ==
The game covers the period 1830–2040 in North America (including parts of Canada and Mexico). The game is 'strategic' with emphasis on expansion of rail networks, finance, and competition with other railroads. The general goal of the game is to accumulate the most "prestige", although specific scenarios may have other goals.

The map is the main gameplay screen.

Rails Across America uses a proprietary 2D engine and 3D-flavored sprites, which are outdated when compared to contemporary games of the time. The game is played in a top-down view with various zoom levels. At the closest zoom, one can see animated trains and industries. At the furthest zoom the map is an abstract of the rail network. The user interface includes many 'report' style screens which allow players to analyze the performance of specific aspects of their railroad, to compare themselves to their competitors, to obtain financing, etc.

The seamier side of the great age of railroad expansion is represented by a system of 'influence' which is gained by various achievements, and which can be expended in various ways to undermine the competition. Influence is represented by colored 'cards' with number values and some flavor text. The color and numbers are used in contention with opponents and the outcome can affect finances, construction, prestige, etc. Some smaller scenarios do not use the influence system.

Going bankrupt mid-game can be a viable tactic, suffering a temporary set of restrictions but allowing the player to shed excessive debts in robber-baron style.

Single-player mode includes multiple scenarios with specific goals, and longer 'campaign' games. Multi-player mode supports up to eight players over LAN or GameSpy. Players who drop out are replaced by AIs.

The game provides several options which allow players to customize the experience, especially in multi-player mode.

== Reception ==
Reception

Aggregate score
Aggregator	Score
Metacritic	81/100

Review scores
Publication	Score
Computer Gaming World	4.5/5
GameSpot	7.6/10
IGN	7.5/10
Computer Games Magazine	5/5

According to Phil Steinmeyer of PopTop, developer of Railroad Tycoon 3, Rails Across America received "outstanding reviews" but "sold poorly, and Flying Labs abandoned plans for follow ups".

The game won Computer Gaming World's 2001 "Best Game We Just Don't Get" special award. The editors wrote, "Rails Across America is a very, very good game—according to a pack of our freelancers. We respect our writers' opinions, but not one of the CGW edit staff could warm up to this 4.5-star robber baron game." The editors of Computer Games Magazine nominated Rails Across America as the best strategy game 2001, but ultimately gave the award to Civilization III. However, it won the magazine's special award for "Best Multiplayer".

== See also ==
- Chris Sawyer's Locomotion
- Sid Meier's Railroads!
- Pirates of the Burning Sea
