= Jon Radoff =

American entrepreneur

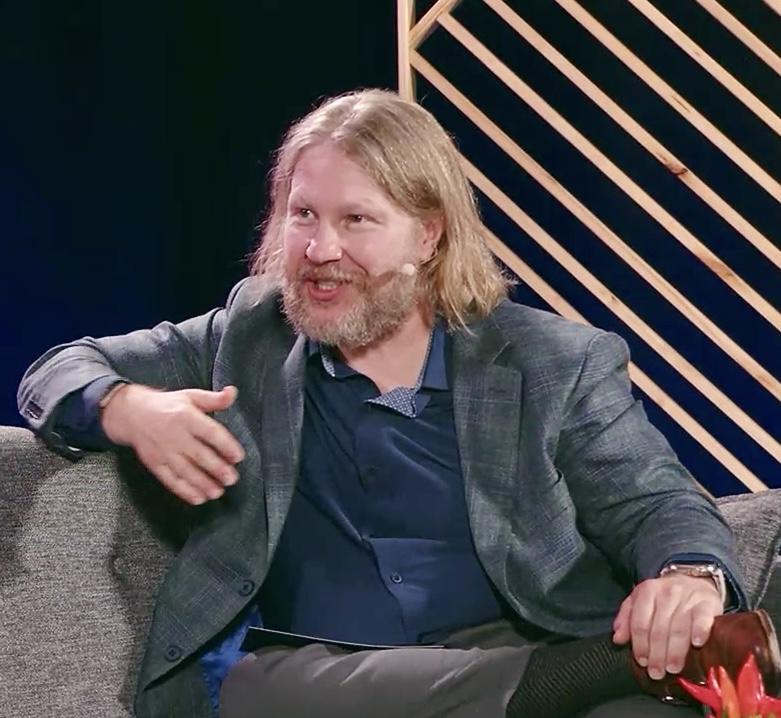
- Jon Radoff at Gamescom Congress 2024
- Born: September 17, 1972 (age 54); United States
- Education: Harvard University
- Occupations: CEO, Beamable Inc.

Jon Radoff (born September 17, 1972) is an American entrepreneur, author and game designer. His work has focused on online communities, Internet media and computer games. He is CEO and co-founder of Beamable, a Live Game services platform that enables the creation of online games based on Unity. Skillz acquired Beamable in January 2026.

Radoff began his career when he dropped out of college to found NovaLink, an early internet service provider. In 1991, while at NovaLink, he created Legends of Future Past, one of the first commercial MMORPGs.

In 1997, he founded Eprise Corporation, a creator of Web content management software. Eprise went public on the NASDAQ stock market in 2000 and was acquired by Divine Inc. in 2001.

On September 21, 2006, Radoff founded GamerDNA, a social media company that developed social gaming communities and a videogame advertising network. GamerDNA is now part of Live Gamer.

In March 2010, Radoff started a new social game company called Disruptor Beam that built games for Facebook. In February 2013, the company released Game of Thrones Ascent. The company ultimately sold its games to other publishers, underwent a reorganization, and relaunched as Beamable.

== Writing ==
Radoff wrote Game On: Energize your Business with Social Games, which was published by Wiley in 2011. The book discusses social games, which Radoff views as a 5,000-year-old phenomena, and how games can be applied to businesses to make them more engaging and profitable. Radoff is generally critical of the gamification trend, and explains to businesses that they must incorporate story and immersion into their businesses if they really want to take advantage of the unique engagement offered by games.

Radoff's blog, Metavert Meditations, contains his writing on subjects including games, internet, metaverse, AR/VR, blockchain and artificial intelligence.

== Early career ==
Radoff lived in Northborough, Massachusetts and was a 1991 graduate of Algonquin Regional High School. During his high school years, he developed Space Empire Elite, a bulletin board system strategy game for Atari ST BBS systems. Much of the money Radoff earned from Space Empire Elite and his other Atari ST game, Final Frontier, later became seed capital which he used to start the company NovaLink.

Later authors who maintained or contributed to SEE include Jurgen van den Handel, Steven P. Reed, Carlis Darby, David Pence, Doc Wynne, David Jones, and Dick Pederson. Also while in high school, Radoff purchased the rights to port the Atari ST BBS software StarLink, which supported FidoNet, to the Amiga; Radoff named the ported software Paragon BBS. After a brief time studying at Worcester Polytechnic Institute, Radoff dropped out to form his first company.

== Games ==
The games developed, co-developed and/or directed by Jon Radoff:

Game	Release	Notes
Space Empire Elite	1987	Classic BBS Door for Atari ST. Later released/ported for Amiga, VAX, PC and many other computers.
Final Frontier	1988	BBS Door for Atari ST
Legends of Future Past	1991	Multiplayer interactive fiction game played on Tymnet, CompuServe Network
Cyber Corp	1993	Multiplayer online tactical strategy game
True Pirates	2011	Social network game set in the Golden Age of Piracy
50 Cent Blackjack	2012	Social network game in connection with 50 Cent
Game of Thrones Ascent	2013	Mobile game based on Game of Thrones
Star Trek Timelines	2016	Mobile game based on Star Trek
The Walking Dead: March to War	2017	Mobile game based on The Walking Dead
Archer: Danger Phone	2020	Mobile game based on the FX Series Archer
