= Pirates of the Burning Sea =

2008 video game

- Developers: Flying Lab Software (defunct); Portalus Games (present)
- Publishers: Current: Vision Online Games; EU, NA: Portalus Games; OC: Gamearena; Former: Sony Online Entertainment; Vision Online Games Portalus Games (Europe, USA)
- Platform: Windows
- Release: January 22, 2008
- Genre: Massively multiplayer online role-playing
- Mode: Multiplayer

Pirates of the Burning Sea is a massively multiplayer online role-playing game (MMORPG) previously developed by Flying Lab Software and Portalus Games, and currently supported by Vision Online Games. The game is set in the Caribbean in an anachronistic 1720 and combines tactical ship battles and swashbuckling combat with a player-driven economy and open-ended gameplay. In the game, players can choose from four nations: Great Britain, Spain, France and the generically named 'Pirates'.

The game was originally set to be closed in September 2018 by Portalus Games, but in 2019 Vision Online Games took over the game's operation, including the support for increased development and advertising.

== Gameplay ==
=== Careers ===
Players can choose a career for their avatars when they begin the game. The Career determines what abilities and features they will accrue as a captain. The player will receive one point for their avatar's career on every other level gained. These points can be spent in various ways depending on which career the player has chosen. Once a career is chosen, it cannot be changed.

There are a total of 45 skills for each career. The skill trees are composed of nine skill chains, each five skills in depth. A player will be able to reach the end of a single skill chain by Rank 15, and is then considered somewhat equal to a Rank 50 in that skill chain.

The different careers for nationals (British, Spanish, French) are:

- Naval officer - focuses on defense, escorting duties, and direct, broadside-to-broadside combat. Naval Officers gain access to powerful ships of the line.
- Privateer - focuses on utilizing the advantages of smaller ships to outmaneuver and outwit opponents. Privateers have an edge in boarding combat and can learn a skill that enables them to use Pirate PvP zones.
- Freetrader - focuses on trading, production and economics. They have abilities to effectively evade opponents in combat. Freetraders may learn skills that increase their ability to gather resources and produce goods. The different careers for pirates are:
- Cutthroat - all-around capability including the special ability to take command of defeated ships. These ships only have one durability point. If a Pirate takes command of a class specific ship he will automatically be flagged for PvP. Before version 1.4 this career was called just "Pirate" and was the only career available to the 'Pirate' faction.
- Buccaneer - more advanced career with more in the moment type skills. The command oriented "pirate", can use and collect captured ships deeds and can give bonuses to allied ships.

=== Characters ===
Players in Pirates of the Burning Sea can create up to six characters per server to represent themselves in the game. Each of them will captain their own ship and fight either for a nation of their choice or as a Pirate. As the player moves along in the game, the character will develop by gaining ranks (the equivalent of levels in other MMOs). The player can thus unlock new features, such as fighting abilities, and, most importantly, will be able to captain larger and better ships. The maximum rank a player can reach is 50.

When the character is first created, the player chooses a faction to join. This can be any one of either Britain, France, Spain or the Pirates, known as the Brethren of the Coast. The Dutch are also shown throughout the game, but are not playable. Each of the four factions have different starting ports, and therefore access to different resources at the start of the game.

Originally, a player was restricted to one nation per server, and this choice could only be undone by deleting all of that player's characters on that server. In the course of merging servers, this restriction was altered; players are still restricted to playing one nation at a time, but can change which nation they play for after each conquest cycle.

The 2008 server merge further complicated the situation as, despite being open to all, different servers cater to different populations and have different peak activity (for example, Roberts is an 'EU' server, with high activity during its corresponding time-zone). Only one semi-official European server exists.

After a player has chosen a nation, they can customize the looks of their character, selecting from a variety of costume pieces. The character's appearance can be changed freely in-game, and additional costume piece selections can be earned or purchased in-game.

==== Swashbuckling ====
Swashbuckling is the name given to avatar combat in Pirates of the Burning Sea. Players initially select from one of three different sword-based fighting styles, but may change styles later, or opt to learn an unarmed style. As they gain ranks, players earn points to spend on skills. There are a total of 45 skills for each fighting style. The skill tree is composed of 5 skill chains that are each 8 skills in depth.

The four styles are:

- Dirty fighting - fighting with a cutlass and pistol.
- Fencing - fighting with a rapier.
- Florentine - fighting with a small sword and dagger.
- Brawling - fighting bare-handed, or with brass knuckles or similar aids.

=== Port contention ===
Port contention is a system whereby players can generate "unrest" to enable PvP near a port. As players complete certain PvE missions, kill NPCs near the port, or turn in items, they contribute "unrest points". This can be counteracted by other players by completing certain missions and item donations. When enough unrest points accumulate, an area around the port is enabled for PvP. This initial PvP zone allows pirates and those in the privateer career to initiate combat with players from other faction.

If unrest points continue to accumulate, the PvP-enabled zone around the port grows in size, and is split into two parts; the outer ring works as the smaller zone did before, while the center of the zone is opened up for PvP to all players. The new zone persists until it is quelled, or until one faction accumulates sufficient points to put the port into contention.

For roughly two days after a port is put into contention, the faction that previously controlled the port and the faction that gained the most unrest compete to accumulate contention points, which grant them advantages when the port battle begins at the end of the contention period. The port battle is a 24 vs. 24 player battle, and the winner of the battle takes control of the port, whereupon the contention process can begin again.

=== Ships ===
As it stands there are approximately 55 ships in the game, with the aim to add more over time. What ship the player chooses to sail will affect both his combat capabilities and his economic capabilities. Most of these ships have been user created.

As a general rule, the bigger the ship, the less maneuverable it is. This means that even though a ship is bigger and has more and heavier cannons, it will not necessarily be the better choice. Because of the way combat works, ship speed and maneuverability has a great effect on combat. Small ships, especially in large groups, will in many cases be able to beat larger ships solely because of this, although the developers have stated that smaller ships are not designed to take out larger ships in a one-on-one stand off, but to play support roles to other ships such as harassing the enemy ships.

Ships of different sizes also have different cargo hold sizes. This is especially important to freetraders (the more cargo the player can bring from one port to another, the more they will be able to earn on a single trip). Merchant ships are generally less armed than warships, but have more cargo space.

A player is allowed to have up to 5 ships at various ports at any one time, and can save up to 100 additional ships in storage at their nation's capital. Though only one can be sailed, the others can be docked in port, fitted and ready for action. The player will also be able to transfer himself directly from one docked ship to another. This means that the player will have easy access to any of his ships, no matter how far away they are.

==== Durability ====
Durability is a system devised to deal with ship losses. It accounts for the largest expenditure in the economy, it assures that players tread carefully in their expensive ships, and is, together with specific cargo items that are lost when a ship is sunk, the only 'death penalty' beyond lost time.

In the game, each ship has a set number of durability points. When a ship is sunk or defeated it loses a durability point. If it loses its last point, it is considered destroyed and lost. This way, players will want to keep as many Durability Points as possible, because durability directly equals the value of the ship. Ships captured by pirates have only one durability point.

In order to keep the bigger ships in demand and in order to make them more expensive, the higher level ships will have much fewer Durability Points than the expendable, smaller ships. This assures that the higher level ships will be risky to bring into combat, and players may think twice before sacrificing their ship.

The 1.5 patch added an insurance system which refunds 90% of a ships construction value (not the actual price paid by the player) upon loss of all points of durability. This was implemented for varied reasons, which included National players being unwilling to fight against Pirate players.

Pirate players capture highest level ships for free. This caused national players to avoid the free ships as the risk of losing an expensive ship was much greater than the reward of defeating a pirate who had a free ship.

==== Shot types ====
Various types of ammunition are available for use, and can be manufactured, purchased or, made available as a quest reward. Most commonly, 11 different types of cannon shot is available, and this can be subdivided into 3 distinct categories:

- Round shot (primarily damages armor, structure and enemy guns) – basic round shot (the default ammunition available in infinite supply for all guns on all vessels when no other shot type is loaded), stone shot, heavy round shot, bronze round shot, explosive round shot
- Antipersonnel shot (primarily damages crew) – grapeshot, canister shot, langridge (improvised canister shot)
- Dismantling shot (primarily damages rigging) – bar shot, chain shot, star shot

==== User-created ships, sails and flags ====
One of the unique features of Pirates of the Burning Sea is the system in place for players to create and submit ships, sails (emblems) and flags. If the ship, sail or flag passes a rather rigorous approval system, it is implemented into the game for anyone to use. Some user created ships, sails and flags were in the game at launch, and further additions continue.

=== Societies ===
In the game, players can form groups known as Societies. These function much like guilds in other MMOs, and feature several tools that can be used for communication amongst its members. Players are only able to join a society with members of their own nation. The primary advantage of a society is the community of players with whom one might cooperate to achieve their own ends.

=== Economy ===
The economy in PotBS is a player-driven, production-based system. This means that everything is made by players, but not by the avatars themselves.

Players manage plots of anything from lumbermills to shipyards in order to produce goods that can either be sold to other players or be used by the producer themselves. The buildings will then save up hours, in real time, that can be used for production. They will be saved up even when the player is not playing, but only to a maximum of 72 hours. Each account is limited to 10 plots per server.

Many things that a player can produce require several steps in their production. Ships, for example, are made of ship hulls, which are made of planks, which are cut from trees. Along with this, the ship hull needs nails, which are made from iron, which is refined from iron ore. The ship, along with the ship hull, also needs masts, cannons, several hundred yards of rope, and so on.

While there is no requirement to taking part in the economy system, the rewards of doing so are significant. Economy is also directly tied to the port contention system, as who controls a port might control access to resources only available at that port.

== Development ==
Pirates of the Burning Sea has been in development since 2002. During the first few years of development, Flying Lab Software realized that this project required more attention than anticipated. Gradually, not only have they more than doubled their staff, but have also put an MMO entitled Delta Green (based on the role-playing game of the same name), on hold. Beta testing began on 14 December 2005, and ran until 1 January 2008.

Pirates of the Burning Sea was released on January 22, 2008. The game was formerly subscription-based, but switched to a multi-tiered freemium model in November 2010. Access was also included in Sony Online Entertainment's Station Access Pass.

In April 2008 one-time server transfers were added along with the announcement that the original server list was being reduced to four, in an effort to increase server populations. By November, seven servers were closed. As of March 2009 the six active servers worldwide that are available for new player creation and transfers to are Antigua (North America/World), Blackbeard (North America/World), Rackham (North America/World), Defiant (Australia), Caribbean (Russia) and Roberts (Europe). In March 2010, the servers were further condensed into two: Roberts and Antigua.

In December 2012, Sony Online Entertainment removed Pirates of the Burning Sea from their online offerings. Former members of game developer Flying Lab Software formed Portalus Games to run the game and host it. Portalus has been running the game since February 2013.

In 2018, Portalus Games began work on closing the game with a target date of September 30. They attributed this decision to the game's last remaining programmer leaving the company, but they also noted that they were open to another operator taking over control of the game.

After a period of continued availability thanks to "contributions from players and management", in January 2019 Vision Online Games took over the game's operation and support for new development and advertising.

== Music ==
Over two hours of original swashbuckling music were composed for Pirates of the Burning Sea by Adam Gubman and Jeff Kurtenacker. While many live musicians performed on the soundtrack, the majority of the music was composed digitally. An official soundtrack was released as a promotional item during the pre-order period. There are no copies left in circulation, but two full soundtrack albums are currently available for purchase on iTunes.

== Reception ==
Pirates of the Burning Sea holds a 76% rating at GameRankings. Commonly cited positive aspects of the game include a player-driven economy, balanced classes and compelling PvP, while negative aspects include repetitive character vs. character (as opposed to ship vs. ship) fighting and a steep learning curve.

During the 12th Annual Interactive Achievement Awards, the Academy of Interactive Arts & Sciences nominated Pirates of the Burning Sea for "Massively Multiplayer Game of the Year".

== See also ==
- Rails Across America, the previous game by Flying Lab Software
