= Spacetime Studios =

Games development studio

- Type: Video Game Development Studio
- Industry: Video games
- Founded: 2005
- Headquarters: Austin, Texas, US
- Area served: Worldwide
- Key people: Gary Gattis, Cinco Barnes, Anthony L. Sommers, Jake Rodgers
- Website: http://www.spacetimestudios.com/

Spacetime Studios (STS) is a games development studio, based in Austin, Texas. Founded in 2005 by a small group of PC MMO game developers. The start-up was created with the aim to create Sci-Fi MMOs for the PC market.

== History ==
In 2005, Spacetime Studios was founded by Gary Gattis, Cinco Barnes, Anthony L. Sommers and Jake Rodgers, with collaborative experience working on such titles as Wing Commander, Star Wars Galaxies and Ultima Online. In March 2006, they successfully contracted to begin development of an original IP for a PC sci-fi MMO for NCSoft called Blackstar. This was facilitated in part by the veteran game developer's long-standing working partnership with personnel at NCSoft and familiar with their previous work on sci-fi games.

After several years of preproduction work, in January 2008, NCSoft cancelled their agreement with STS to publish Blackstar, citing a change in economic conditions in the market, after poor performance of two other MMOs in their publishing group such as Tabula Rasa and a consequent reassessment of the Korean publisher's North American portfolio strategy. Spacetime Studios had initially contracted the full rights and ownership of the technology and tools for the newly created in-house game engine called the Spacetime Engine, written in C++ for the purpose of massively scalable tools and in-game assets. But NCSoft still owned the Blackstar IP, including all artistic concepts and narration assets.

STS laid off 12 team members as a result of this and continues to explore options to bring its flagship IP Blackstar to market in addition to unveiling a first glimpse of Blackstar video clip in February to market the project to a new publisher in addition to a presence at Games Developer's Conference that year. In May 2008, STS reacquires the Blackstar IP from NCSoft. Uncertainty in what is perceived as a difficult market transition leads to STS to consider various options to attract a new publisher or market the project to console and/or as a free-to-play business model. In August 2008, STS halved its staff in search of a new publisher and delivered video footage of preproduction of their game for GDC showcase.

In June 2009, STS published some concept art from Blackstar in a sign that it is still confident and committed to developing the project. STS announces completion of pre-production ready for mass production of Blackstar but subsequently reduces staff to the four founding members plus two. During 2009 STS invested time experimenting with the iOS applications during self-publishing games such as Shotgun granny under the moniker of ClockRocket Games and decided a Mobile MMO is achievable on this platform using the spacetime engine.

The development began in October 2009 and completed the underlying mechanics of a new game called Pocket Legends in January 2010. On 3 April 2010, Spacetime Studios launched Pocket Legends in a stripped-down mobile mmorpg. In September 2010 Spacetime Studios updates the app regularly Spacetime and announces multiplatform support including the Android platform with Investment from Insight Venture Partners.

On February 10, 2011, STS announced development of their original title, Blackstar, and confirm it will be released Quarter 2 of 2011. Subsequently, Blackstar was showcased at GDC, in March 2011, for the third time in its development history and receives widespread press coverage and interest in the games industry. In April 2011, Spacetime Studios celebrated the anniversary of its fantasy mobile mmo, Pocket Legends release. In 2012, STS announced that their games had exceeded over 250 million play sessions.

On January 12, 2014, they explained that no new expansions for Pocket Legends were released since 2012, as the player base has shrunk due to the company's focus on the launch of new titles.

== Spacetime Engine ==
The Spacetime Engine allows a cross-platform (iOS, Android, Windows, OS X, Linux, PC) play across a wide range of radio-transmission technologies (edge, 3g, 4g, Wi-Fi) across a wide range of device specifications and types, allowing effective performance data communication between the client and server, e.g. consistently <1 kbit/s. It allows rapid delivery of updates (in addition & external to Apple app store approval process), resulting in such statistic as updating Pocket Legends MMO on average 2 times daily with over 200 updates over a 12-month period. "We can do that because that's our engine, and we know that we can release stable content. People ask how much we test the content, and sometimes not that much. But we know it's going to be stable, it's not going to break the servers. It might be off balance, but we release it, put up a feedback thread..." ~ Gary Gattis at GDC 2010.

== Developing Mobile MMOs ==
With the unveiling of the iPhone at MacWorld, 2007, signified an important development in developer environment and an entirely new digital market of downloadable apps with micro-transactions. These factors led to Spacetime Studios investigating the developer and production "pipelines" of this new market opportunity and deciding that a 3D mobile MMO was a newly viable development prospect. Technically in 2009: "We're done with pre-production, which means we can confidently mass-produce engaging content. Our tools are data-driven, so they're very extensible. [...] Developers can have a fresh build of the game installed on their systems with a single-click. This would allow Spacetime Studios to have a fully multiplayer game running within one month and full prototype within two months. and within four months the core game had been completed (TenTonHammer Podcast #27).

Spacetime Studios summarized the challenges creating a mobile mmo that was restricted by hardware power, bandwidth over EDGE, small display size, touch controls for user input, wide appeal to a casual userbase for whom games would be a secondary consideration, significantly reduced gaming sessions ranging from 5–10 minutes and a bottom-line of highly consistent levels of performance, underpinning an active and responsive core gameplay experience with scope in future design that allowed for organic growth. Instanced levels, as opposed to a persistent open world, allowed the game to be playable on low end devices and low-bandwidth connectivity. It Allows quick formation of groups of players through hot-joinable hosted games, allows for short 10-minute level completion and future levels addition with scope for variable duration and depth of gameplay required.

== iOS & android markets ==
Pocket Legends has been downloaded over 4 million times in over 200 countries from April 2010 to May 2011 on both iOS and Android platforms. On top of those download figures, Pocket Legends monetizes at 10% compared to an average of 2% for other apps.

Pocket Legends initially released on iOS on 3 April 2010, with subsequent release onto Android in September, 2010. Currently Apple has over 190m iOS devices (with 350,000 apps downloaded >10b times) compared to Android's 100m devices (150,000 apps downloaded 3.7b times) as of March–April 2011. expectations would be in line with general trends in financial success of other apps that would predict higher monetization on iOS than Android. But in an interview with Computerworld's JR Raphael Spacetime Studios disclosed app data comparing iOS with Android first 30 & 60 days:

- Daily user activity on Android is more than double its level on iOS in practically every measure
- 9,000 daily downloads on Android compared to 3,000–4,000 daily downloads on iOS in the same time periods
- App use is x3 times higher on Android than iOS.
- 30-50% higher revenue on Android than iOS.
- Ad clicking is also x3 higher and Ad purchasing x2 higher on Android than iOS over the same timeframe.

Gary Gattis: "In some ways, it's kind of like the wild, wild West, but that's where the gold rush people made their claim. For us, the challenges have become opportunities."

== Games developed or published by Spacetime Studios ==
- Pocket Legends (fantasy style MMO, development of new expansions ceased since 2012)
- Star Legends: The Blackstar Chronicles (science fiction style MMO)
- Dark Legends (vampire style MMO)
- Arcane Legends (another fantasy style MMO)
- Battle Dragons (Strategy Games)
- Battle Command! (Strategy Games)
- Arcane Battlegrounds (Strategy Games)
- Call of Champions (MOBA game)
- Pocket Legends Adventures
