= Legends of Future Past =

- Developer: NovaLink (f/k/a Inner Circle Software)
- Publisher: NovaLink
- Designers: Jon Radoff; Angela Bull
- Platform: Internet
- Release: ^{NA} 1992
- Genre: MUD
- Mode: Multiplayer

Legends of Future Past was the first commercial text-based MUD to make the transition from a proprietary network provider (CompuServe, in this case) to the Internet. It was designed by Jon Radoff and Angela Bull. It was also notable in that it had paid Game Masters who conducted online events. The game was originally offered for $6.00 per hour in 1992 via CompuServe, and then lesser amounts via the Internet, operating until December 31, 1999.

Legends introduced one of the first (if not the first) crafting system in an online game. Players could harvest resources including ores, herbs and skins, and then use them to make weapons, armor and enchanted items. The game system was skill-based; players were not constrained to premade class archetypes. There were no level caps, and some very dedicated players attained levels in the hundreds.

Legends of Future Past was set in the "Shattered Realms", a world featuring a blend of fantasy and ancient technology. Most of the action in the game revolved around the city of Fayd, which served as the hub of activity for adventures, intrigue and roleplaying events. Some of the races included: aelfen (an elflike species), drakin (a race of dragon-men that ultimately resulted in player-created languages and cultural institutions), ephemerals (a wraithlike species that could not be harmed unless the player chose to manifest themself), highlander (think dwarves), humans (the only people who could utilize ancient technology), murg (a proud warrior race), mechanoids (artificial beings) and wolflings (a race of shapechangers).

Computer Game Review awarded Legends of Future Past the Golden Triad Award. It also won the award for artistic excellence in Computer Gaming World's 1993 Online Game of the Year competition, stating that they were overwhelmed by the creative power of storytelling and fertile liveliness.

Legends is credited with spawning a number of other online games and introducing some of the top talent in the MMORPG industry. Many GameMasters and developers at Legends of Future Past went on to become founders or product managers at top online games including SOE's Star Wars Galaxies, Worlds Apart Productions and Dejobaan Games. Jon Radoff, the developer of the game, created a gaming social network called GamerDNA and has started a social gaming company Disruptor Beam which holds the license to Game of Thrones.

== Reception ==
"Ranger" Chris Lombardi reviewed the game for Computer Gaming World, and stated that "this is no casual hobby, but if multi-player role-playing is one's game, it is definitely time to don one's favorite alter-ego, check into the local adventurers guild and poke around. It just might be "The Realm" in which one's personal Legends are made".

Computer Gaming World in 1993 wrote that Legends of Future Past was "a rich, dynamic and lovingly supervised world of the imagination ... Like most of these games, this one is extremely addicting — perhaps even more so". That year the magazine gave the game a Special Award for Artistic Excellence, and nominated it for On-Line Game of the Year.

== Revival ==
Although the source code to the game was lost, it was brought back online in 2026 with agentic AI by using Claude Code to re-learn all of the original game logic from the script files (which had been preserved). The game is now available to play for free, and the source code is available under the MIT License.
