= Star Legends: The Blackstar Chronicles =

2011 video game

- Developer: Spacetime Studios
- Engine: Spacetime Engine
- Platforms: iOS; Android; Chrome browser
- Release: Q2:2011
- Genres: MMORPG; Sci-fi
- Modes: Player vs Environment; Player versus player

Star Legends: The Blackstar Chronicles is a 3D mobile MMO by Spacetime Studios, creators of the popular iOS & Android app: Pocket Legends.

== Gameplay ==
Star Legends is a mission-based CORPG (Co-Operative Role-Playing Game) similar in design to PC MMO CORPG Guild Wars. The Blackstar Chronicles refers to the Episodic content of Star Legends: the game story is split into a series of chapters available as frequent updates, for players to download and purchase in-app to continue their character's progress and exploration of the Star Legends Fantasy-Sci Fi universe.

Each level is chosen from a central hub menu of currently hot-joinable games hosted by other players or an option to host a newly created, player mission. Each mission consists of an instanced level that can hold from between 1-5 players simultaneously, for solo or cooperative play online. Each mission contains several sub-levels designed around a common theme within the lore and world-background story of the Blackstar Chronicles, all hosted by a single server with multiple versions of levels (5 player limit) and social area zones (25 player limit) running concurrently. Standard MMO features include: Global Chat, Friend List and Trading of virtual items eg.

Co-operative Story Mode is an RPG Player vs Environment (PvE) mission-based story. Players take on the role of space privateers (avatars) forming cooperative teams and accepting missions involving different objectives such as clearing levels of AI-controlled aliens, navigating randomly generated content and solving environmental puzzles, while progressing their levels, skill abilities and equipment to aid them exploring more challenging levels spread across the entire Blackstar Chronicles Universe.

Privateer vs Privateer Mode is a Player vs Player: (PvP) mode where different teams of privateers (players) battle each other in instanced arenas, separate from the main PvE game.

Ground Combat: Combat uses a touch-tap targeting system GUI as used in Pocket Legends for players to move and activate skills and target AI-enemies. Environmental obstacles include: Solving puzzles by destroying or deactivating flame-turret sentries, opening closed doors, hacking computer terminals or flicking switches in the correct order. Class-specific skill-combinations involve intra/inter-class combinations/timing for players to maximize their damage output by teamwork and communication. Players will primarily level in terms of enhancing their equipment, adding new skills and statistical powerups as well as meeting minimum level requirements to access higher and more challenging levels and continue their branching story options.

Space Combat: According to a recent interview with Gary Gattis with MMORPGitalia: "Not at launch, but the engine supports it. The sky is the limit." would indicate that this feature, possible by means of the Spacetime Engine, will not be available at launch.

== Game story ==
In 41st century, there is war and destruction amongst the distant stars of the galaxy between four different races: The futuristic humans of the United Colonies Defense Force and their robotic allies known as the Mode against the demonic, alien Scorn and their necro-cyborg allies, the Riven.

Rumors abound that the crew of UCS Blackstar have discovered a novel alien presence on a nearby colony. Seeing an opportunity to turn a quick profit, countless privateers leap into action to carve out their fate among the stars in the hope of making their fortunes and fame.

== Development history ==
In March 2006 Spacetime Studios (STS) entered into a development contract with MMO publisher NCSoft to design a PC MMO based on a new IP called Blackstar. In January 2008, NCSoft cancelled their contract as publishers, citing a change in economic conditions and portfolio strategy. In 2009 Spacetime Studios began researching game development under the guise of Clockrocket Games for the newly released iOS platform on the iPhone. Development began on a new mobile MMO IP called Pocket Legends. Positive reception of their first title led to STS announcing the redevelopment of Blackstar for iOS and Android mobile suite of devices, on 10 February 2011.

== Technical requirements ==
Star Legends is an Online game requiring an internet connection over Wi-Fi or Mobile Broadband (EDGE, 3G & 4G). Most specifications of iOS & Android Smartphone/Tablet devices utilizing a Multi-touch Touchscreen GUI are compatible. Star Legends utilizes a single Cross-Platform Server to host all games, globally.

== Pricing and production ==
Star Legends is Free-To-Download App utilizing Micro-transactions aka the commercially dominant "Freemium" pricing model as found in other social gaming apps. Additionally, a PC-Windows client is run internally by the developers but is not set for retail until online security safeguards against hacking on this platform and a streamlined commercial strategy can be resolved.

The exceptionally long development and production of the Blackstar IP, includes over 250,000 words written for lore and narration and several years worth of concept art by former Visual Director of Blackstar, David Levy (who subsequently worked on the motion picture remake Tron: Legacy). Development of Blackstar began in 2006 and is scheduled to be completed in Q2: 2011, Gary Gattis (CEO of STS) believes: "Blackstar’s production design and overall polish will be unmatched in mobile gaming. [The company was] able to nurture the IP to its maximum potential through years of development – a luxury never before seen in Mobile gaming."
