= Underlight =

1998 video game

- Developers: Lyra Studios LLC (1997–2006); Ixios Studios (2008–2013); Red Coat Games (2013); KoiWare (2014-)
- Publishers: Lyra Studios LLC (1997–2006); Ixios Studios (2008–2013); Red Coat Games (2013); KoiWare (2014-)
- Platform: Windows
- Release: March 1998
- Genre: Role-playing game
- Mode: Multiplayer

Underlight is a fantasy multiplayer online role-playing game. It was Lyra Studio's first product and launched on MPlayer.com in March 1998. The game is currently managed by KoiWare and was released on Steam in December 2018.

The game currently operates on a free-to-play model, but players are able to purchase 'Pmare credits' allowing them to play as powerful monsters instead of normal characters.

== Gameplay ==
Underlight is a first-person graphical MUD. Players move around the world using the graphical interface, with speech, emotes, and feedback from the environment reported in a chat window. The game world is divided into a series of rooms, many of which spawn items or monsters regularly. Multiple rooms make up a plane, each of which has its own theme and access requirement. Mechanically, planes are identical but it's typically easier to communicate with players on the same plane than on different ones.

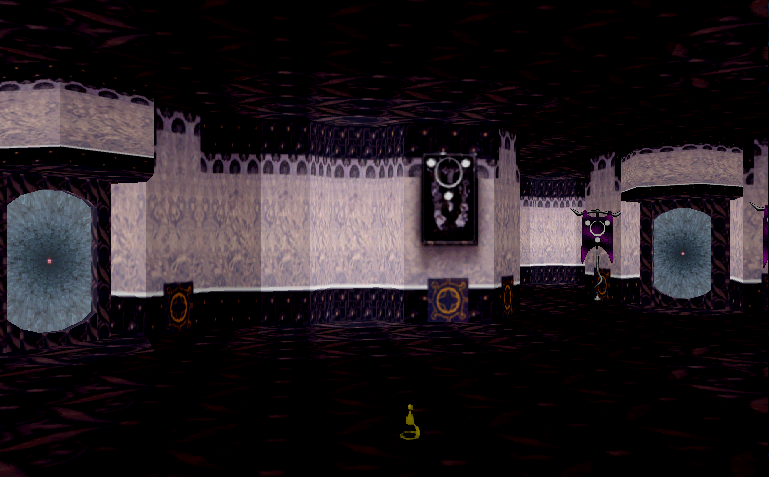
A room with two portals to other rooms, and an item on the floor which can be picked up.

Characters specializations fall into four focuses, each selected at character creation, which determine the skills they learn as they level up. Gatekeepers, aligned with the element of Willpower, are a melee-oriented focus, having the strongest basic attacks and the ability to block off doorways. Dreamseers, aligned with Insight, have the most potent ranged arts and are the best at using items. Soulmasters, aligned with Resilience, are a defense-oriented focus with the ability to shield and heal others. Fatesenders, aligned with Lucidity, are regarded as tricksters and have the ability to inflict various status effects on players and monsters alike.

Aside from defeating monsters, characters can gain experience by completing tasks granted to them by other players. Skills also have levels which have a chance to increase each time the skill is used, making them slightly faster and more powerful. Progression for both character levels and skills is restricted every tenth level until the character completes a task. These are typically assigned by another player who has been granted the title of 'teacher', which is in turn granted by a game master.

Roleplay in the game is strictly enforced and the game is notable for lacking any non-player characters other than most monsters. The most powerful monsters are also controlled by players or game masters and have the same abilities as characters, being able to move between rooms, trade items, and converse, although their speech is filtered through a basic cipher for any characters listening, and vice versa.

Characters also have the ability to join (or start) factions in the game. If the faction is large enough, they can take control of one of the eight strongholds in the world, granting members access to that stronghold and any skills exclusive to it.

On death, characters normally lose experience, drop a random item, and become a ghostly sphere that is only able to move and speak. The character is restored when they return to a non-combat zone, or Sanctuary. The game does allow players to 'kill' other characters permanently through the use of a particularly rare and powerful skill, though the difficulty of obtaining and using it prevents all but the most experienced and renowned characters from doing so.

== Setting ==
Underlight takes place within the City of Dreams - a consciousness shared by all those who visit it and enveloped by the Chaos, the source of the nightmares in the city. Characters come from a realm called Cloudsbreak, a plane divided into an infinite number of 'shards', one for each player, which are unable to interact with each other and are relatively mundane. Characters arrive in the city during sleep, and thus logging out is referred to and roleplayed as waking.

Most story events in the game are entirely player driven, and structured around the existence of up to eight houses that open and close as events in the game transpire, and as factions rise and fall. Each house has its own ideology and conflict between the houses often plays a major role in the plots and motivations of individual characters.

The game world itself is spread across multiple planes, with each house controlling one of the basic planes accessible by new dreamers. Planes that are only open to higher level dreamers tend to be further away from the city's hub, more dangerous, and more affected and distorted by the surrounding Chaos.

The game uses different terms for most familiar concepts that reflect the setting and help to facilitate roleplay. Characters are called 'dreamers' while monsters are called 'nightmares'. Items are 'talismans', skills are called 'arts'. Art levels are 'plateaus', character levels are 'orbits', every ten character levels is a 'sphere'. Logging out is 'waking' and staying logged in while away from the computer is referred to as 'trancing'.

== Development ==
The game was developed by Lyra Studios, a company based in Marina del Rey, California.

The game is currently developed and continually produced by KoiWare LLC. More information can be found out Underlight or KoiWare
