= The Shadow of Yserbius =

1991 video game

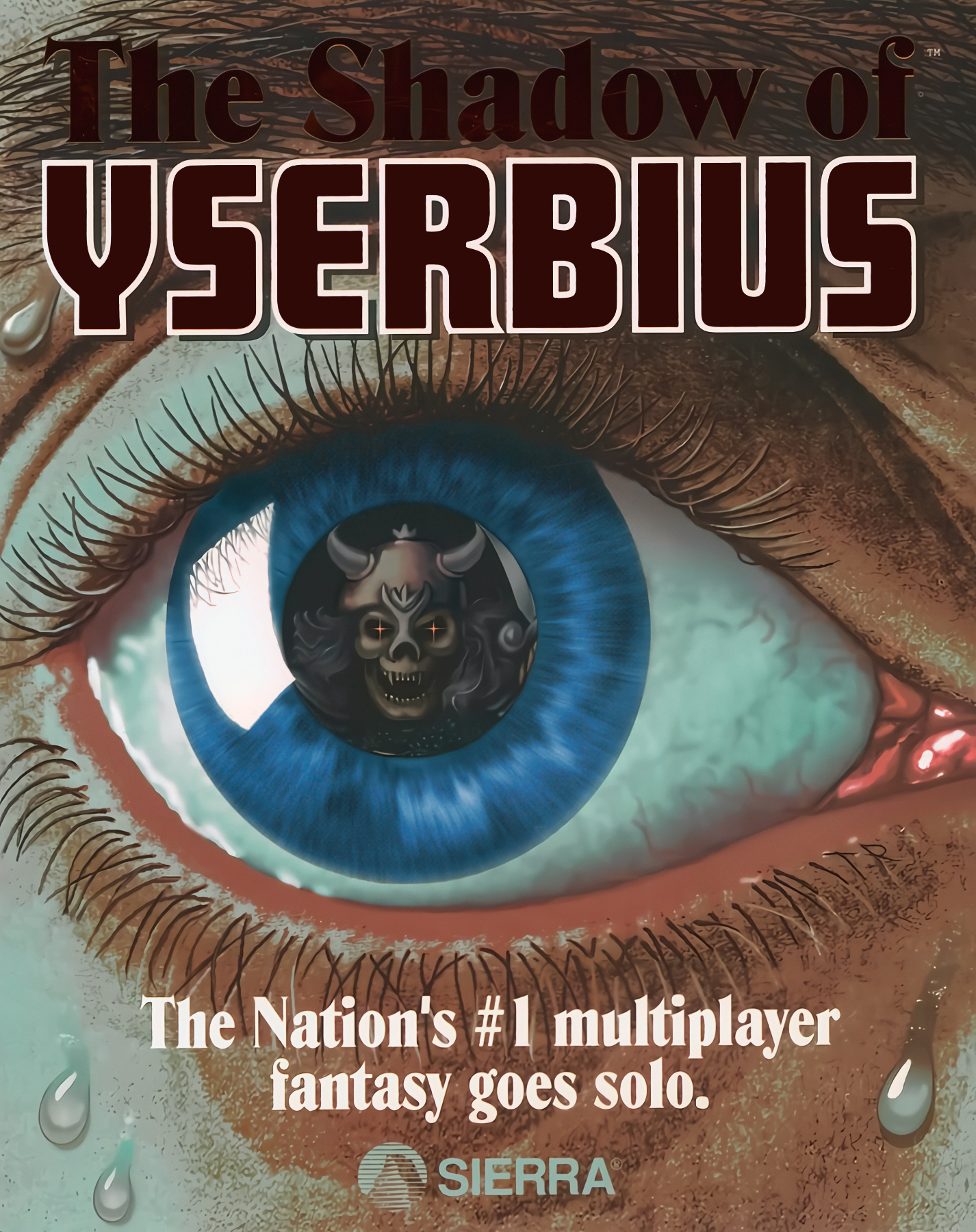
- Developer: Ybarra Productions
- Publisher: Sierra On-Line
- Platform: MS-DOS
- Release: 1991 (incl. with TSN); 1992 (offline port by Sierra); 1994/5 (incl. with INN)
- Genres: MUD; RPG
- Modes: Single-player, multiplayer

The Shadow of Yserbius, originally published by Sierra On-Line and developed by Joe Ybarra of Ybarra Productions, was the first of three graphical MUDs for the online community. The Shadow of Yserbius and its successors remained online until 1996, when America Online purchased the rights from AT&T for an undisclosed price (rumored to be $40 million). AOL soon abandoned The Shadow of Yserbius, which was a competitor to its existing online RPG Neverwinter Nights.

In late 2007, the ImagiNation Revival Project succeeded in resurrecting the long-dormant ImagiNation Network by using the original client software coupled with DOSBox. The Shadow of Yserbius was again available for online play with all features, graphics, sounds, and such fully intact and functional. Macros were fully supported and compatibility with old character and map files was enabled for TSN/INN versions 2.4 and higher. In early 2016, the server was shut down making online play not possible until recently.

The game was followed by two sequels: The Fates of Twinion (1993) and The Ruins of Cawdor (1995).

== Gameplay ==
Combat was simple turn-based point and click fare, typical of many graphical RPGs of its time.

The goal of the game was to kill an evil elemental creature called En-li-Kil. There were a number of "rooms", where up to 30 (later 60) people could meet and adventure together in groups of up to four. Combat was turn-based.

The available professions were Barbarian, Knight, Ranger, Thief, Cleric, and Wizard. Player races included Human, Orc, Elf, Troll, Dwarf, Gnome, Halfling, and Gremlin.

Another popular pastime was player vs. player sparring. Many players were members of guilds.

== Reception ==
Reception

Award
Publication	Award
Computer Gaming World	Finalist, Online Game of the Year, June 1994

Computer Gaming World in 1993 called the online version's static artwork "lovely" and approved of the questing and, especially, the social nature of the game. The magazine concluded that "those who possess the money would be well served to try out TSN and Yserbius". In June 1994 Shadow of Yserbius: Fates of Twinion was a finalist for Computer Gaming World's "Online Game of the Year" award, losing to Multiplayer BattleTech.

James V. Trunzo reviewed The Shadow of Yserbius in White Wolf #41 (March, 1994), giving it a final evaluation of "Below Average" for solo play but "Excellent" for online play and stated that "once you take away interaction with live friends and foes, Yserbius is just another hack-and-slay adventure game, lacking most of the features considered standard in other games of its ilk."

Computer Gaming World in 1994 stated that the boxed set of offline versions of Yserbius and Twinion was "a hollow shell of its vibrant on-line self ... Playing Yserbius without fellow on-line gamers is like being in an amusement park after hours, on in which the rides aren't all that fun to begin with". While acknowledging that "there is something to be said for" its "refreshingly simple" gameplay, and the usefulness of an offline way to learn and level up characters for the online version, the magazine concluded that most fantasy RPG players would be disappointed when Betrayal at Krondor, Lands of Lore, and other alternatives were available.

== Remake ==
MedievaLands is a complete remake of The Shadow of Yserbius and its sequel, The Fates of Twinion. In addition to support for modern Windows and macOS platforms, MedievaLands adds quality of life and gameplay functionality inspired by successors of the original games.
