= Game of Thrones Ascent =

2013 video game

- Developer: Disruptor Beam
- Publisher: Disruptor Beam
- Platforms: Facebook, iOS, Android, Browser
- Release: WW: February 21, 2013 (Beta)
- Genre: Strategy

Game of Thrones Ascent was a 2013 strategy game developed and published by Disruptor Beam for iOS, Facebook, Android, and web browser. and The game is based on the television series Game of Thrones, which is an adaptation of the series of fantasy novels A Song of Ice and Fire by George R. R. Martin. According to Martin, the game features "alliance building, treachery, marriages, murders, and most of all the constant struggle to be the greatest house in Westeros." The game includes the ability to engage in the dynamic political and social intrigue featured in the books and television show. The game had over 9 million registered players though daily activity suggested 3 thousand active players.

Disruptor Beam released the first expansion for the game, titled "The Long Night", in October 2014. The expansion allows players to travel beyond "The Wall" and offers upgrades to the game's Alliances system, along with new quests to complete and items to collect.

On October 5, 2018, it was announced that Game of Thrones: Ascent would be shutting down on January 3, 2019, ahead of the television series' final season.

== Gameplay ==
Game of Thrones Ascent was a point-and-click casual, role-playing/strategy video game. The player takes on the role of the head of a minor house, swearing allegiance to one of the Great Houses of Westeros, building and managing a keep and army of Sworn Swords. Players complete quests and build their holdings as solo play, making choices that influence their alignment and affect future quests.

They can also engage in player versus player conflict, both one-on-one with individual players, or as part of an Alliance in larger-scale wars. These wars are scheduled in 5-week "cycles", beginning with a week of low-conflict preparation, followed by three weeks of Alliance-versus-Alliance combat competing for ranks across eight of the nine major geographical areas of Westeros, and concluded with a week-long cooperative event. Of the Alliances that participated in these events "King's Landing" was the Number One ranked over the life of the game.

== Setting ==
The game closely followed the HBO television series, with weekly content updates following the airing of each episode. Quests allowed the player to participate in major events from the story in various ways, as well an original storyline exploring your character's past and current events at your holdings.

The player selected their primary location by swearing fealty to House Stark, House Lannister, House Greyjoy, House Baratheon, House Targaryen, House Tyrell, House Tully, or House Martell. However, the character visits many notable locations through the course of the game, including several famous places in Essos.
