= WildStar =

2014 video game

- Developer: Carbine Studios
- Publisher: NCSoft
- Directors: Mike Donatelli; Matt Mocarski
- Producer: Jeremy Gaffney
- Writer: Chad Moore
- Composer: Jeff Kurtenacker
- Engine: Proprietary
- Platform: Microsoft Windows
- Release: NA: June 3, 2014
- Genre: Online role-playing game
- Mode: Online multiplayer

WildStar was a massively multiplayer online role-playing game that was developed by Carbine Studios, published by NCSoft. It was unveiled on August 17, 2011, during Gamescom. WildStar was set in a fantasy/science fiction world on the fictional planet Nexus, where a mysterious and powerful race known as the Eldan have disappeared, leaving behind a wealth of technology and secrets for players to explore.

The game was released on June 3, 2014, with a subscription and later changed to free-to-play on September 29, 2015. While it was no longer required to pay for a subscription, those who did were "signature" members, getting a few bonuses such as increased experience/currency gain.

On September 6, 2018, NCSoft announced the immediate closure of Carbine Studios and that they "will begin the process of winding WildStar down". A shut-down date was later set for November 28, 2018.

== Plot ==
=== Setting ===
The Eldan, a highly advanced alien race, sought to create a perfect being called the Genesis Prime through the Nexus Project. This being, whom the Eldan named Drusera, seemed kind and benevolent, and was capable of shaping reality as she saw fit; shortly thereafter, the Eldan realized that their creation was less than perfect: Drusera contained an alternate, malicious personality which they called the Entity. They attempted to destroy the Entity using a device called the primal disintegrator. However, they were unsuccessful, and in retaliation the Entity annihilated all Eldan on the planet Nexus. Distraught over her failure to save the Eldan, Drusera then imprisoned herself (and by extension, the Entity).

Before their sudden extinction, the Eldan had sown the seeds for an intergalactic empire; they had contacted humans inhabiting a planet called Cassus, and assisted them in forming a mighty civilization which would span galaxies and ultimately be under Eldan control. After their patrons' disappearance, the majority of the Cassian humans continued as they had done before, forming a religion around the vanished Eldan. A splinter faction, who would become known as the Exiles, rebelled against the nascent Dominion and fled into the stars; over the years they accumulated other races who had grievances with the Cassian Dominion.

Shortly before the beginning of the game, an Exile explorer rediscovers Nexus. Both factions attempt to lay claim to the world: the Exiles want a planet to settle and call home, while the Dominion see the world as sacred and consider it a holy obligation to take it for themselves. Unfortunately for both sides, Nexus still contains Drusera, the Entity, and many holdovers from the Nexus project, both mechanical and living; the factions wrestling for control of the Eldan world need to fight not only each other, but the world itself.

== Gameplay ==
In WildStar, players were able to create a character that they could control through their playing session. These characters could move in an open, persistent world environment. Characters could level from 1 to 50. Gameplay mainly consisted of quests, dungeons, and player versus player combat.

=== Movement ===
WildStar allowed the player many liberties in movement, such as double jumping, sprinting, and dashing. This tied into the gameplay in ways such as speed races and jumping puzzles.

Moreover, there were zones with altered gravity in the game, allowing the player to jump higher.

=== Combat ===
A player confronts a boss in a party of 5 people. Both the player and the boss have their health points displayed on the center-left and center-right of the image, respectively.

WildStar used a system of telegraphs for combat, where zones are displayed on the ground, allowing a player to predict attacks of enemies and heals of allies. A player could dodge them by either walking or dashing out of them.

Player attacks were also telegraphs, this means that players had to cast them in the right direction if they wanted to damage enemies. Players also had the option of auto-targeting enemies, which puts the telegraph for the move they use centered on their current target. This made it easier to get a particular enemy into their telegraph, but often wouldn't catch as many enemies as a well-placed free-targeting attack would.

=== Housing ===
In WildStar, players could own a sky plot. This plot was a part of land consisting of a house and several "sockets", each socket could receive different "plugs". Plugs could consist of many different things, such as a crafting bench, a mine, an exploration shaft, etc.

The exterior offered not only plugs, but a remodel feature to change the ground, sky, and background music as well as complete creative freedom with "decor". Decor could be placed anywhere, rescaled in size, and rotated three different ways. Each housing plot had the option to put down one of many houses at the center of the exterior, which could be entered for a house interior that could have its walls, floors, ceiling, and lighting modified through remodeling, as well as free decor placement such as on the exterior. Various interior decorations offer a bonus to rested experience if a player logged out inside their home, making a house the best source of rested experience in the game.

This plot could be accessed by anyone who has the owner's permission. Every plug could be used by all the players who have access to this plot. If a visitor performed a task such as harvesting, the reward can be split by the visitor and the owner of the plot, allowing friends to maintain a plot for the owner and allowing both to benefit.

While housing was not a required part of the game, it offered many advantages to the players, from personal workbenches, gathering nodes, personal dungeons, quicker access to raids, and increased rested experience.

Near the game's sunset, "Housing Communities" were added. Allowing up to five housing plots belonging to different characters to be combined with some space between each individual skyplot to freely decorate with the housing decor.

=== Character advancement ===
Upon character creation, players would be able to choose among six classes, four paths, and eight races. Classes were limited to certain pre-determined races. There were no inherent statistical or game play differences in the different races; the difference was all aesthetic.

Each class was able to fulfill the role of DPS as well as one of the support roles, tank or healer.

WildStar also used a system of paths. Upon character creation, players were able to choose among the four paths, in addition to their desired class. Unlike classes, paths were not restricted to specific races, and leveled up independently of class, capping at 30. The paths were loosely based on the Bartle player types. The path the player chose upon character creation determined what kind of extra content the player enjoys, and each path gave players unique bonuses and benefits.

=== Player versus player ===
WildStar offered numerous means of player conflict. WildStar allowed players of opposing factions to fight almost anywhere within the in-game world.

In addition to open world combat, players were able to participate in more organized combat, such as arenas, battlegrounds, or War Plots, where players fought each other in teams.

Arenas consisted of small teams (2v2, 3v3, or 5v5) attempting to kill the opposing group of enemies. Each team had a set amount of respawns. A match was won when all of the members of a certain team had been killed, and were unable to respawn.

Battlegrounds consisted of larger teams (10v10 to 15v15). Matches were centered on varying objectives, and victory conditions were dependent upon the nature of the objectives teams are tasked with.

War Plots have the biggest teams (30v30). A War Plot is a fortress controlled by a War Party. Players of a War Party had to build the War Plot in order to increase its attack and defense possibilities. Matches were then organized by two War Parties. Victory is then obtained when players take control of the opposing team's War Plot.

=== Raiding ===
One of the main attractions of WildStar was its unique style of player vs. environment encounters, or raids. Carbine Studios took a stance unlike other games at the time and marketed raid encounters as "hardcore". Two primary raid instances were available in both 20 player and 40 player formats. The game began with the 20 man Genetic Archives instance and players progressed towards the 40 player Datascape instance. A future patch would lower the player number required in this instance to 20. In 2016 the third raid was added named Redmoon Terror. The raid is for 20 players. The encounters were unique in that they were built primarily off of WildStar's telegraph combat system, meaning players would need to interact with bosses in unfamiliar ways to defeat them.

== Development ==
WildStar development started in 2005, after 17 former members of Blizzard Entertainment founded Carbine Studios. At the time, the team expressed their desire to "do anything but WoW". The team decided it would be best for them to create their own game engine to allow for complete freedom and control over the new project.

In 2007, NCSoft acquired Carbine Studios, saying they were working on an unannounced MMO project.

WildStar was first announced by NCSoft at Gamescom 2011 and that it would use the subscription model. Two weeks later, more footage of the game was released at PAX Prime 2011.

WildStar initially gave players two methods of paying for the game's subscription: a monthly fee, or the purchase of an in-game item, C.R.E.D.D., with real money. C.R.E.D.D. granted 30 days of playtime and is tradable to other players for in-game currency. This essentially enables the player-driven economy to set the in-game price for C.R.E.D.D., and thus an exchange rate between real money and in-game currency.

On May 28, 2015, NCSoft announced that the game would become free-to-play to all players starting on September 29, 2015. Coinciding with the launch of the free-to-play model, the game received graphical updates that improves the lighting system, skyboxes, and viewing distance.

In February 2016, NCSoft closed the game's PvP servers for being under-populated and those users were merged with the two remaining PvE servers.

The decision to close down Carbine Studios, and shutdown the WildStar game servers, was announced by NCSoft at a staff meeting on September 6, 2018, after at least two other projects were declined by the publisher. NCSoft promised to refund in-game purchases made after July 1, 2018. WildStar's servers were announced to go offline on November 28, 2018, at 5:00 pm EST via the game website and the Steam Discussion threads.

=== Audio ===
The soundtrack for WildStar was composed and arranged by Jeff Kurtenacker.

== Reception ==
Reception

Aggregate scores
Aggregator	Score
GameRankings	(PC) 80.52%
Metacritic	(PC) 82/100

Review scores
Publication	Score
Eurogamer	8/10
G4	N/A
GamesRadar+	3.5/5
IGN	8.7/10

WildStar was released to mostly positive reviews. Aggregating review websites Metacritic and GamingRankings held a rating of 82/100 and 80.52% respectively. Reviewers praised the game for its own unique style and personality, an active battle system, and numerous side features such as housing and challenges. IGN's Branden Tyrrel remarked that "...WildStar is of course not the next evolution of the modern MMORPG. Instead, it's much more the culmination of a decade’s worth of experimentation and design, cherry-picked and enhanced, and infused with Carbine’s twists and light-hearted flourish". GamesRadar praised the game's combat system and its side features, but panned the game's traditional questing as "patience-breakingly long" and its story-telling as "shallow".
