= Carbine Studios =

American video game developer

Carbine Studios, Inc.
- Type: Subsidiary
- Industry: Video games
- Founded: 2005; 21 years ago
- Defunct: September 7, 2018
- Headquarters: Aliso Viejo, California, U.S.
- Products: WildStar
- Parent: NCSoft
- Website: https://www.carbinestudios.com/

Carbine Studios, Inc. was a video game developer and subsidiary of NCSoft, founded in 2005 by former members of Blizzard Entertainment. They were the developers of the online role-playing game WildStar.

== History ==
In the spring of 2005, Kevin Beardslee, the lead animator of World of Warcraft, resigned alongside nine of the game's developers, citing displeasure with low bonuses from Blizzard Entertainment despite the game's success. When acquired by NCSoft in 2007, the studio had recruited another seven Blizzard employees, as well as developers from other studios.

In March 2016, NCSoft announced a reorganization with Polygon reporting that more than 70 Carbine employees were laid off, roughly 40% of the studio's staff. The studio would still focus on Wildstar development, but it cancelled the planned Chinese version of the game.

In April 2017, job postings hiring for an unannounced title were added to the Carbine website. These mentioned use of Unreal Engine, and for applicants who have experience with "AAA cooperative multiplayer experience, multiplayer action combat titles."

On September 6, 2018, NCSoft announced that Carbine Studios would be immediately closed and "begin the process of winding WildStar down".

== Game ==
WildStar, a science fantasy MMORPG, was the only game released by Carbine Studios. Despite achieving initial success, the game's players dwindled over the next four years. The initial subscription-based model was abandoned and restructured into a free-to-play model with in-game microtransactions. Wildstar was closed on November 28, 2018, announced via the game's website and the official Steam forums.
