= The Sierra Network =

Online gaming service (1991–1998)

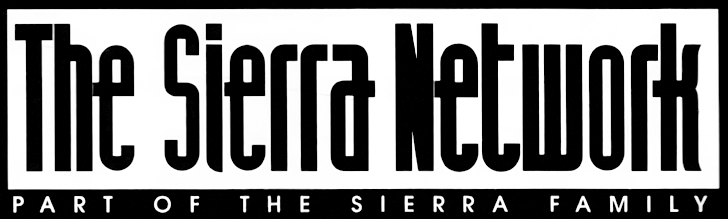
- Logo
- Predecessors: Sierra BBS
- Founded: May 1991; 35 years ago
- Defunct: 1998
- Headquarters: Oakhurst, California, United States

The Sierra Network (TSN), later rebranded as the ImagiNation Network (INN), was an online service launched in 1991 by Sierra On-Line. Developed beginning in 1989, the service offered subscribers an online space to play games and socialize, billing itself as a "cyberspace theme park." TSN was the first service focused exclusively on online gaming and was among the early adopters of online avatars.

== History ==
"What if I could invent something which would allow my grandma to pick up a card game, 24 hours a day, seven days a week, without leaving home, at a cost she could afford?"

— Ken Williams, original TSN mission statement

TSN was conceived by Ken Williams, co-founder of Sierra On-Line, who proposed expanding the company's games beyond single-player adventures into a social, online medium. The service launched in 1991 with real-time games and chat between users in different locations.

Previously, Williams had released a modem-supported helicopter flight simulator. He also took an interest in Prodigy, an early online service he called a "preview of the future." Prodigy was the first platform to integrate text with a graphical user interface and content designed for a mainstream audience.

Williams initially proposed "The Constant Companion", a compact unit that could connect to a television, similar to conventional video game systems. It required only a power source and telephone line, with a built-in modem. The target price was approximately $99, with revenue coming from subscription fees rather than hardware sales.

NEC initially collaborated with Williams, supplying computers and equipment for a Constant Companion prototype. When NEC's interest waned, Sierra shifted focus to personal computers and rebranded the project as "The Sierra Network."

The technical execution fell to Jeff Stephenson, Sierra's lead system programmer, who developed a new programming language for online gaming: an online-enabled version of Sierra's Creative Interpreter that supported multiple players and a point-and-click interface.

TSN launched with a simple interface, intended for users new to online gaming, and familiar games such as bridge.

The company expanded into rented office space in Oakhurst within a building previously known as The Old Barn, a restaurant with a Wild West theme. The building, recognizable by its water tower, later appeared on the service's home screen.

By November 1992, the company had invested $10 million in developing the service, aiming for 50,000 members by March 1993.

== Features and games ==
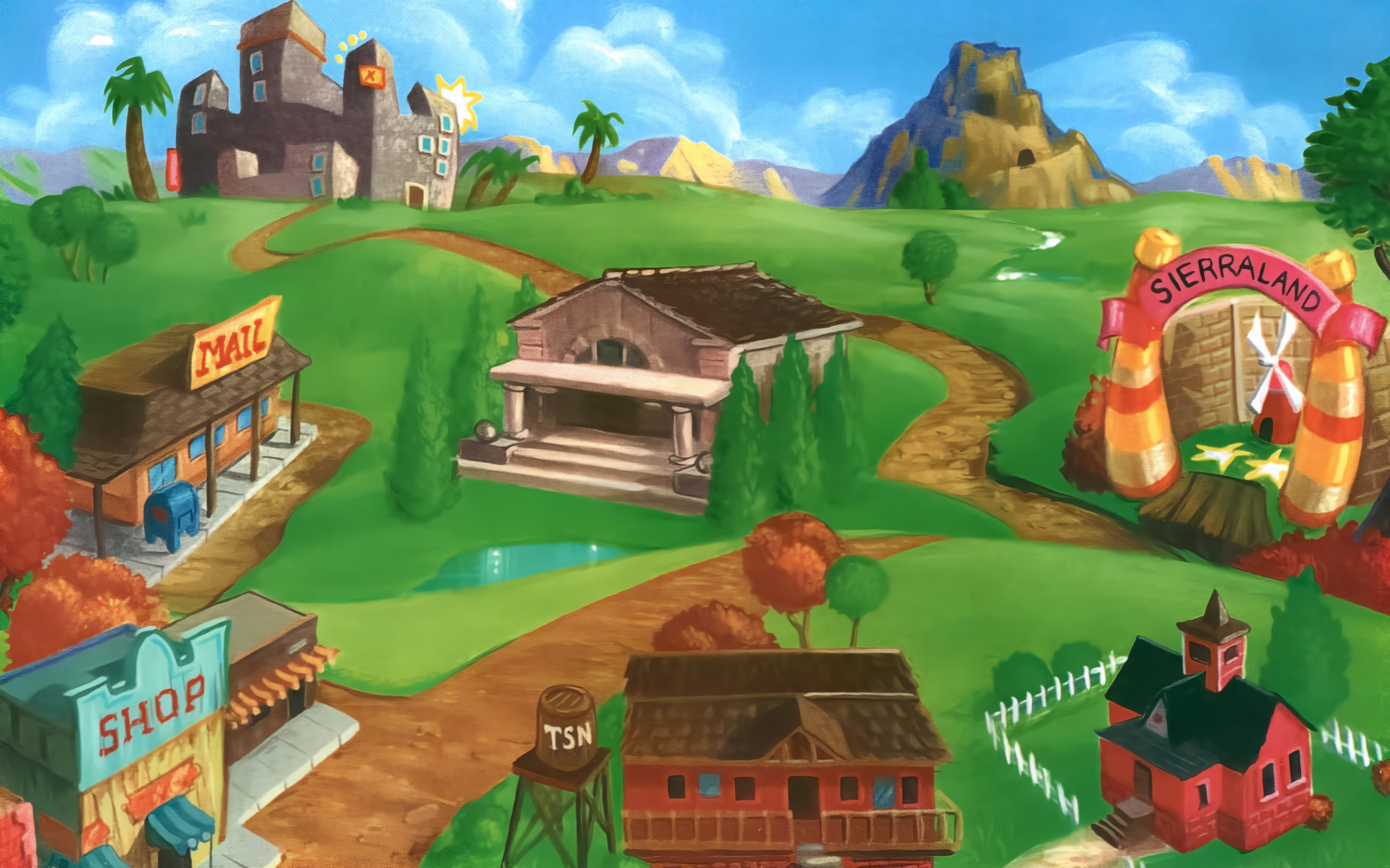
The Sierra Network home screen

Unlike many services available at the time, which used text-based interfaces, TSN used a graphical interface. The platform supported both multiplayer and single-player games, and users could create avatars and form guilds or clubs. TSN also offered online shopping, then uncommon in digital services. TSN was later described as "tragically ahead of its time".

Williams modeled The Sierra Network on Disneyland's themed lands, planning a digital theme park with distinct areas for different audiences and interests.

- The Town Hall: Offered administrative services, including billing details and an events calendar.
- The Mall: Initially offered physical copies of Sierra games and branded T-shirts via mail-order. The aim was to eventually evolve into a digital distribution platform for Sierra games.
- The Post Office: Allowed members to send and receive email.
- The Clubhouse: Provided access to traditional games such as chess, checkers, bridge, and backgammon.
- SierraLand: All-ages experiences with games like miniature golf, paintball, the Red Baron flight simulator, and Graffiti, a program for drawing and creativity.
- LarryLand: Catered to adults with a theme park inspired by the Leisure Suit Larry series, offering casino games and a virtual bar for socializing. The platform encouraged playful interactions like electronic kisses, under the supervision of system operators to maintain appropriate conduct.
- The Shadow of Yserbius: A role-playing game set in Mount Yserbius' dungeons, filled with monsters and puzzles. It combined traditional RPG elements, such as turn-based combat and character development, with social interaction.

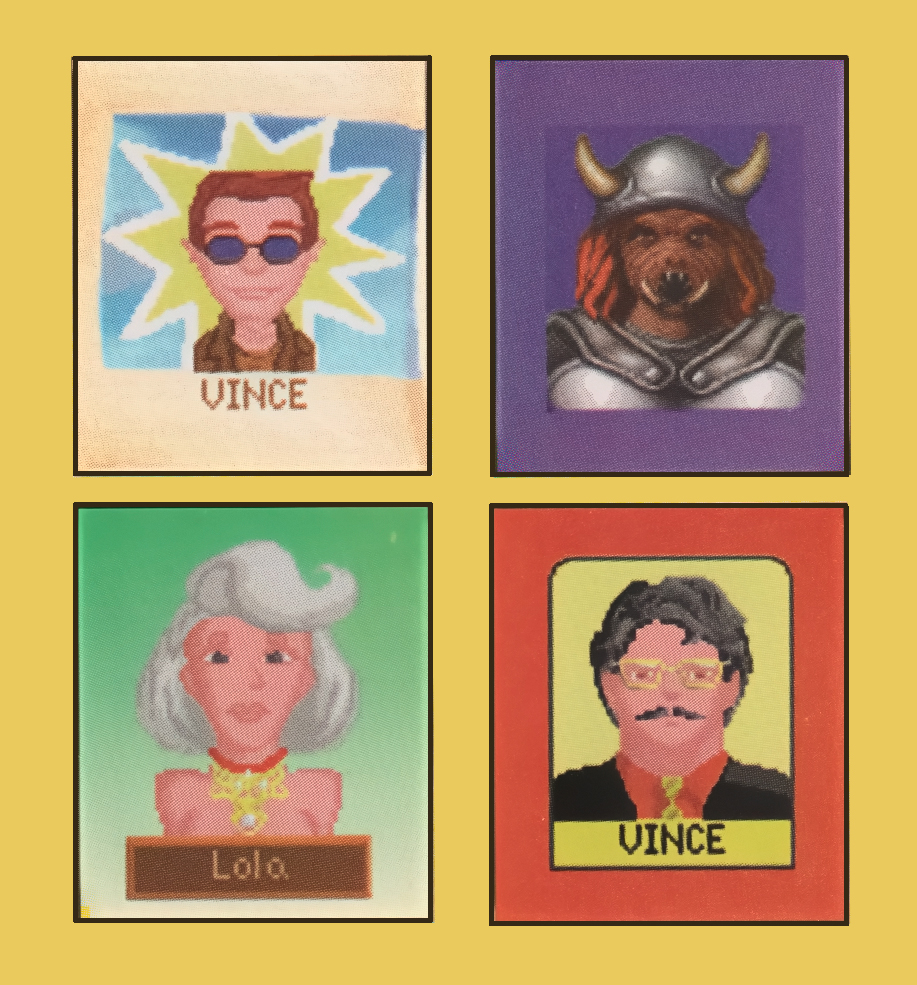
FaceMaker was among the first to offer customizable avatars on online platforms.

TSN also introduced FaceMaker, a tool that allowed members to design a virtual "face" or avatar for their online identity. The avatars, visible during games and chats, could be customized by gender, age, and style. The style of avatars could also change depending on the area of The Sierra Network being accessed. The modular design was inspired by Mr. Potato Head. FaceMaker was an early instance of customizable avatars.

== Pricing ==
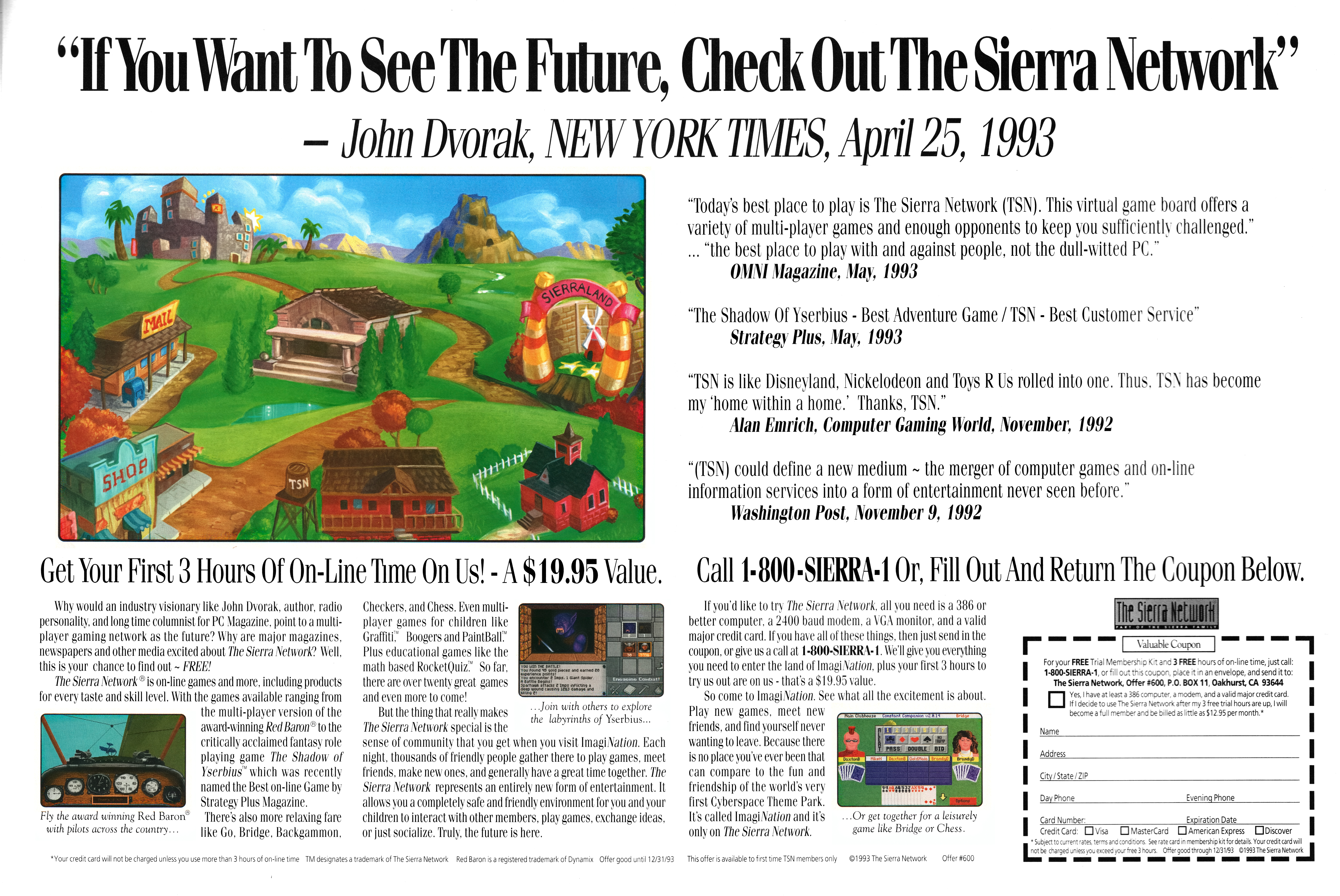
1993 magazine ad for The Sierra Network

In June 1992, TSN introduced a new flat rate pricing model, starting at $12.95 for up to 30 hours of service each month. The company described the flat rate as a long-term marketing strategy.

A central challenge was TSN's high operational costs. The service predated the widespread consumer use of the internet. Users had to dial in through local telephone numbers, which then connected to TSN via Telnet. "It was costing us more per hour to have customers online than what we were getting in revenue," said Williams.

By 1993, the pricing structure had evolved. A basic membership, priced at $12.95 a month, offered 30 hours of access during nights and weekends, but this was limited to Clubhouse games. Additional access to each of the three theme parks required an extra $4 per month. For broader access, packages could cost up to $150 per month and offer more playing time. These prices did not include the telephone charges required for connection, which could cost an additional $6.00 per hour.

The need for a dial-up connection limited potential growth to users within the continental United States. Despite raising prices, the company was losing money rapidly and struggled to meet the initial goal of 50,000 subscribers.

== Partnership, divestiture and closure ==
With TSN losing money and no clear path to profitability, Sierra sold a 20% stake in the service to AT&T in 1993. The network was renamed "The ImagiNation Network". In 1994, AT&T purchased the remaining stake for $40 million, taking over network infrastructure, customer acquisition, and billing.

AT&T planned to invest $5 million into developing new games for the platform. It also entered into an agreement to make ImagiNation accessible on Sega video game consoles, and AT&T officials said they intended to develop a version of a 3DO player that would include software for accessing the Sierra Network. The service struggled under the new corporate ownership, hampered by bureaucracy and attempts to overhaul its underlying code base. After several frustrating years, AT&T sold the ImagiNation Network in 1996 to America Online. By 1998, the service was discontinued.

Bill Gates and Microsoft showed interest in purchasing TSN concurrently with AT&T's initial investment. Gates argued that Microsoft's bid would have been more advantageous for Sierra's shareholders than AT&T's offer, and that Microsoft's emphasis on online ventures was a better match for TSN's direction than AT&T's wider-ranging strategy.
