= Pocket Legends =

2010 video game

- Developer: Spacetime Games
- Platforms: iOS; Android; Internet Browser
- Release: iOS: April 3, 2010; Android: November 11, 2010
- Genre: MMORPG
- Modes: Single-player, multiplayer

Pocket Legends is an iOS and Android mobile 3D MMO developed by Spacetime Studios. It has variously been described as the first cross-platform, mobile 3D MMO.

== Gameplay ==
Pocket Legends is a level-based CORPG (Co-Operative Role-Playing Game) similar in design to PC MMO Diablo II for Dungeon crawl gameplay and traditional side-quests found in other MMOs. Each level is chosen from a central hub menu of currently hot-joinable games hosted by other players or an option to host a newly created, player mission. Each mission consists of an instanced level that can hold from between 1–5 players simultaneously, for solo or cooperative play online. Each mission contains several sub-levels designed around a common theme within the lore and world-background story of the Fantasy World Of Alterra, all hosted by a single server with multiple versions of levels (5 player limit) and social area zones, called Townes (25 player limit), running concurrently. Standard MMO features include: Global Chat, Friend List and Trading of virtual items.

=== Co-operative story mode ===
Is a RPG Player vs Environment (PvE) Level-Clearing: system. Players (avatars) form cooperative teams involving the primary objectives of clearing levels of AI-controlled monsters, collecting item drops and finding treasure chests for gold coins. Players can advance their skill abilities and equipment to aid them exploring the world of Arterra either through inter-connected portals or using the menu-system of hot-joinable games currently in progress. Advances in players experiences points (xp) leads to raising levels and gaining access to more challenging campaigns and end of level boss monsters where greater emphasis on team play and timing of use of combat skills becomes necessary.

Quests: Players can talk to notable Non-Playable Characters (NPCs) and accept Quests to follow the game's story. This side content to the main PvE mode of Level-Clearing, includes a total of 213 unique quests for completing and involve such tasks as kill, fetch and find and rescue quests taken by finding friendly NPC's quest-givers and accepting their challenges in return for rewards such as items and gold coins. Different parts of the land of Arterra are linked by portals and sign-posts to create a connected world for exploration as well as "dungeon-runs".

=== Competitive player vs player ===
Player vs Player (PvP) is an instanced game, separate from PvE except that the same player characters and statistical builds are used in both game modes. Due to level differences, two popular forms of PvP are "Endgame PvP" for maximum level players and "Twinking" for characters at maximum level within their respective level ranges. Player goals are to improve their PvP statistics by improving their "kills/deaths ratios" and to improve their PvP ability in both 1v1 and group formats. Competitions and tournaments are organized and player-run on the STS Forums.

Arena PvP involves two teams of players of either 1v1 or 3v3 or 5v5, identified as either the red or blue team. Teams acquire one point per player killed on the opposite team and the first team to score ten kills wins.

Capture-The-Flag PvP involves two teams with the aim of running a flag without dropping it (being killed) across an arena to score points.

=== Campaigns ===
The main spine, which was made free during Pocket Legends' one year anniversary celebration, allows players to progress from level 1 to 80, the current level cap. Side maps, such as Wildwood, Sandstone Caves, Croc Feud, Skeller Krunch Returns, Frozen Nightmares, and Shadow Caves are also free.

=== Classes ===
There are five different classes in Pocket Legends: Enchantress, Archer, Ranger, Paladin, and Warrior. Each comes with a set of twelve skills. Each skill can be upgraded up to 9 times for characters level 65 and above, and up to 6 times for characters level 64 and below, using skill points that you gain by leveling; one level is equal to one skill point. By end game, not all the skills are able to be maxed, allowing for different "builds" to be used. When an attribute point is maximized for the corresponding Archetype Classes this "Build" produces a classic triumvirate of MMO's: Warrior = Tank; Archer = DPS/Single Target; Enchantress = AOE Nuke/Healer; Ranger = Close Combat DPS; Paladin = Tank/Support. By spending points on atypical attributes a hybrid build is achieved. Additionally splitting attributes between 2 categories produces a Dual-Spec Build.

Attribute	Warrior	Archer	Enchantress	Paladin	Ranger
Strength	Pure	Warbird	Pally	Tank-Rhino	Fox
Dexterity	Dex-Bear	Pure	Dex-Mage	Dexalidan	Fox
Intelligence	Int-Bear	Int-Bird	Pure	Support-Rhino	Fox

Statistical Attributes: The above table demonstrates the core game play in Pocket Legends of stacking attribute points towards a particular statistic to maximize character statistics such as health, strength, percentage chance to dodge or hit an enemy and more that can lead to optimal "builds" enhanced by item customization (below).

Skill Combos: In addition each class can produce combinations of skills for bonus damage between two skills from the same class (small bonus), two skills from two different classes (medium bonus) and three skills from three different classes (large bonus); these are called skill "combos" and along with other combat numbers are visually displayed on screen for performance feedback for players skill use in combat.

=== Items ===
The Item Rarity Index as follows, from most common to rarest: Grey (Trash), White (Common), Orange (Uncommon), Green (Rare), Purple (Epic), Pink (Legendary), Dark Purple (Elite). Certain items are more rare than their color suggests because they have been discontinued. Examples are certain holiday items obtained in holiday maps only available once a year. There is also a Light Blue rarity for vanity items, which replace the appearance of your standard gear. There are also newly added elite weapons which are a dark purple color

In addition, there are item sets. These offer exclusive set bonuses to increase player stats and can be identified on other characters by sparkles emitting from their body. End game dungeons (levels 50–76) holds the bulk of item sets in the game.

=== Pricing ===
The Pocket Legends application is both free to download and play. The maps which compose the "main spine" of content, which allows progression from level 1 to maximum level, is free. Some additional, premium content ranging from extra maps to character upgrades/adjustments and vanities are purchased through the use of Platinum. Platinum is the premium, in game credit used by developer Spacetime Studios to facilitate these transactions. Platinum purchase is not mandatory, however to successfully compete with top players it is almost necessary to spend large amounts of platinum on elixirs. In addition to purchasing Platinum credits, free Platinum may be earned through third party service provider.

== Development ==
=== Pre-release ===
During 2009, STS invested time experimenting with the iOS applications during self-publishing games such as Shotgun granny under the moniker of ClockRocket Games and decided a Mobile MMO is achievable on this platform using the spacetime engine. Work began in October 2009 and completed the underlying mechanics of a new IP called Pocket Legends in January 2010 On April 3, 2010, Spacetime Studios released Pocket Legends in a stripped-down but fully functional and soundly performing mobile mmorpg onto Apple's App Store. In September 2010 Spacetime Studios updates the app regularly Spacetime and announces multiplatform support including the Android platform with Investment from Insight Venture Partners. In April 2011, Spacetime Studios celebrates the anniversary of its fantasy mobile mmo, Pocket Legends release.

=== Post-release ===
For the first 12 months of release from April 2010–11, Pocket Legends was updated over 200 times and patched on average 1.7 times daily. Such statistics include both iOS app store approval submissions, Android market updates and live patches for smaller updates directly using the Spacetime Engine. An example of the first four months post-release development includes: x4 New Maps, New game mode PvP, New Features: World Map, Townes, customization and optimizations and bug fixes.

=== Technical requirements ===
Pocket Legends is an online game requiring an internet connection over Wi-Fi or Mobile Broadband (EDGE & 3G). Most specifications of iOS & Android Smartphone/Tablet devices utilizing a Multi-touch Touchscreen GUI are compatible. Pocket Legends utilizes a single Cross-Platform Server to host all games, globally.

== Reception ==
Pocket Legends was released to positive critical reception and reviews across major games publication sources. Amongst others, Pocket Legends received, "best app/multiplayer game" awards from bestappever.com, Pocket Legends was nominated for "Top 10 Most Innovative MMOs of 2010" alongside such games as EVE Online and World of Warcraft by mmorpg.com website and Spacetime Studios was voted one of the top 50 development studios working on mobile gaming platforms by PocketGamer. In 2010 for the first time, Game Developers Conference (GDC) hosted a "Smartphone Summit" including a presentation by Chief Vision Officer at STS, Cinco Barnes, and again in 2011 on "Mobile Design", in recognition of the growing development of games on this platform and the projected $1 billion in revenues expected for 2011 from social gaming. Wired reporting on an article by technology website "Electricpig", stating that STS was generating revenues of $8,000 per day,

~ "making it a shoo-in for six-figure earnings in the not-too-distant future"..

On the anniversary of the game's launch, Gamasutra described Pocket Legends as:

~ "Pocket Legends is the world's largest 3D Mobile MMO available in the App Store (for the iPhone, iPod touch, and iPad) and the Android Market. Pocket Legends has quickly proved to be popular with both the public and press, gathering praise from the most important publications in the industry."

Latest figures for the app include over 5 million downloads in over 200 territories as of May, 2011.

== Discontinuation of expansion development ==
Since 2019, no new expansions have been released. After the release of Pocket Legends, the developers have released several other mobile MMOs. They argued that the last expansion for Pocket Legends did not monetize as hoped because the player base has shrunk, presumably because most players had moved on to their other MMOs and that they expected more income from focusing on their latest MMO, Arcane Legends.
