= Dungeon crawl =

Type of scenario in fantasy role-playing games

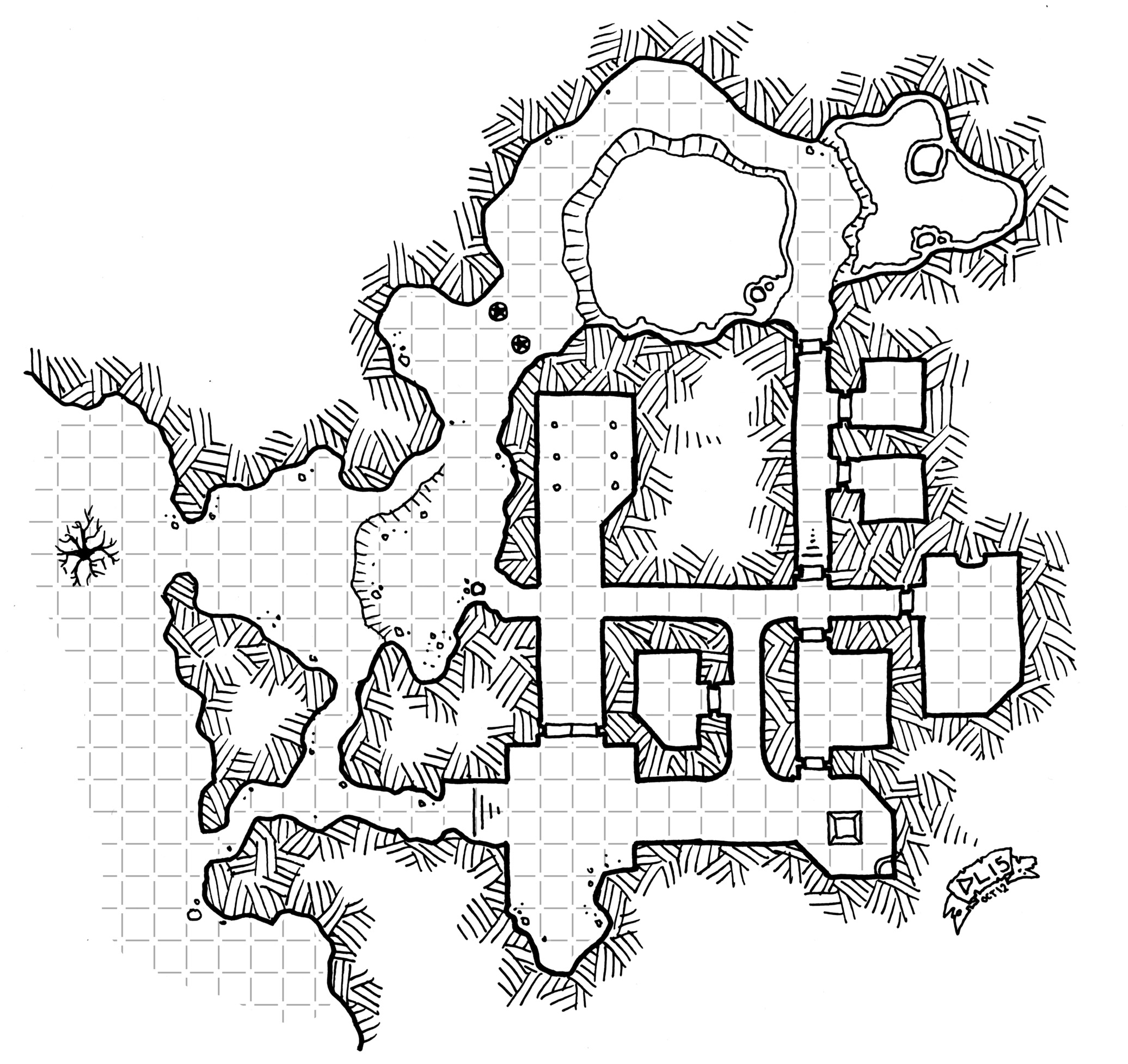
A dungeon map created for a tabletop role-playing game

A dungeon crawl is a type of scenario in fantasy role-playing games (RPGs) in which heroes navigate a labyrinth environment (a "dungeon"), battling various monsters, avoiding traps, solving puzzles, and looting any treasure they may find. Video games and board games which predominantly feature dungeon crawl elements are considered to be a genre.

== Board games ==
Dungeon crawling in board games dates to the 1975 release of Dungeon! Over the years, many games built on that concept. One of the most acclaimed board games of the late 2010s, Gloomhaven, is a dungeon crawler.

== Video games ==
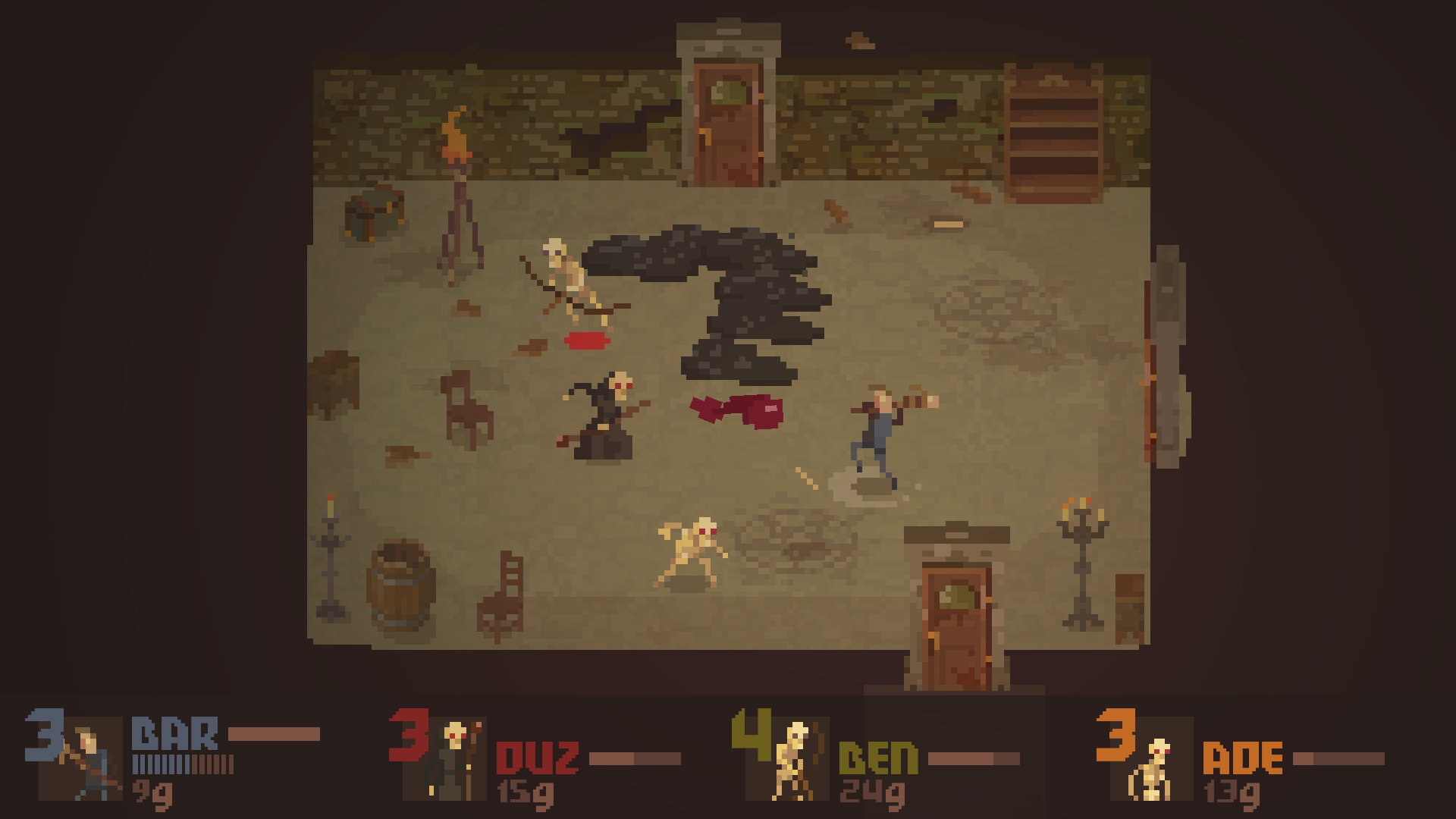
Crawl, a roguelite dungeon game

The first computer-based dungeon crawl was pedit5, developed in 1975 by Rusty Rutherford on the PLATO interactive education system based in Urbana, Illinois. Although this game was quickly deleted from the system, several more like it appeared, including dnd and Moria.

Computer games and series from the 1980s, such as Rogue, The Bard's Tale, Cosmic Soldier, Dungeon Master, Gauntlet, Madō Monogatari, Megami Tensei, Might and Magic, Legend of Zelda, Phantasy Star, Ultima, and Wizardry, helped set the standards of the genre. Their primitive graphics were conducive to this style, due to the need for repetitive tiles or similar-looking graphics to create effective mazes. Game Developer's Matt Barton described Telengard (1982) as a "pure dungeon crawler" for its lack of diversions, and noted its expansive dungeons as a "key selling point".

Some dungeon crawlers from this era also employed action role-playing game combat, such as Dragon Slayer, and The Tower of Druaga. Games that grew out of this style are also considered dungeon crawlers, in that the player is limited to the confines of the walls of the dungeon, but still allows for complex systems around combat, enemy behavior, and loot systems, as well as the potential for multiplayer and online play. Gauntlet, Diablo, The Binding of Isaac and Enter the Gungeon are examples of these dungeon crawlers.

Variations on the dungeon crawl trope can be found in other genres. In the early 2010s there was a modest resurgence in their popularity, particularly in Japan, largely due to the success of the Etrian Odyssey series by Atlus.

=== Instance dungeon ===
In massively multiplayer online games, an instance is a special area, typically a dungeon or a restricted dungeon-like environment, that generates a new copy of the location for each group or certain number of players that enters the area. Instancing, the general term for the use of this technique, addresses several problems encountered by players in the shared spaces of virtual worlds, but also sacrifices the social element of shared spaces and realistic immersion in that virtual world. They also tend to be a lot smaller and more linear.

=== First-person party-based dungeon crawlers ===
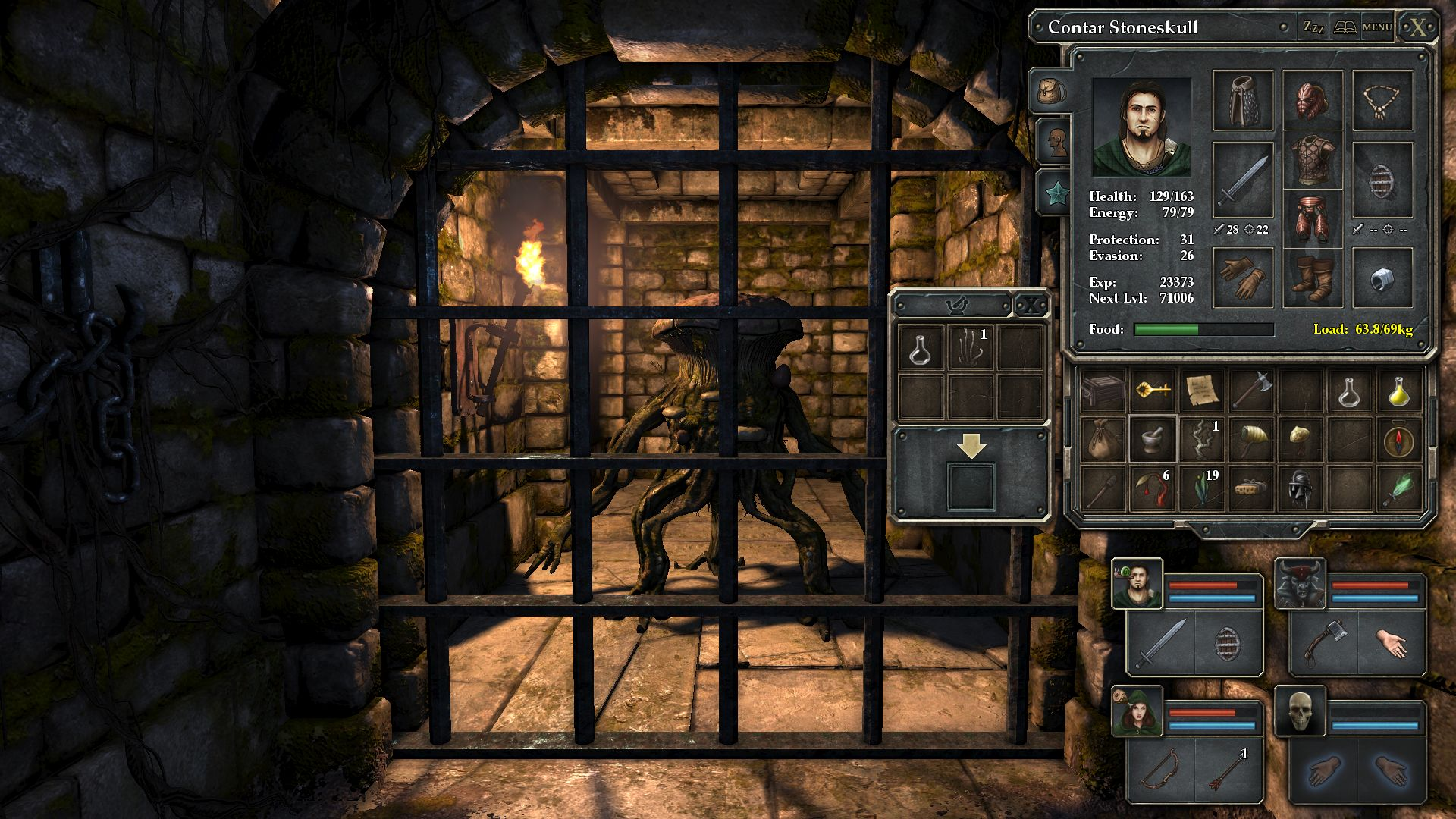
An in-game screenshot from Legend of Grimrock, a first-person grid-based dungeon crawler in the style of Dungeon Master. In the center of the image is the view into the Dungeon. On the right is the open inventory of a party member.

This subgenre consists of RPGs where the player leads a party of adventurers in first-person perspective, typically in a grid-based environment. Examples include the aforementioned Wizardry, Might and Magic and Bard's Tale series; as well as the Etrian Odyssey and Elminage series. Games of this type are also known as "blobbers", since the player moves the entire party around the playing field as a single unit, or "blob".

Many "blobbers" are turn-based, such as the play-by-mail game Heroic Fantasy, but some games such as Dungeon Master, Legend of Grimrock and Eye of the Beholder series are played in real-time. Early games in this genre lack an automap feature, forcing players to draw their own maps to keep track of their progress. Spatial puzzles are common, and players may have to, for instance, move a stone in one part of the level to open a gate in another part of the level.

== See also ==
- Play-by-mail game
- Role-playing game terms
- "Chapter One: The Crawl"
