= Moria (1975 video game) =

Role-playing video game for PLATO computer systems

- PLATO Moria's splash screen
- Developers: Kevet Duncombe; Jim Battin
- Platform: Mainframe computer (PLATO)
- Release: 1975 or 1976
- Genre: Role-playing video game or Dungeon Crawl
- Mode: Multiplayer

Moria is a dungeon crawl style role-playing video game developed for the PLATO system beginning around 1975 by Kevet Duncombe and Jim Battin. In the game, up to ten players can simultaneously journey through a dynamically generated dungeon, presented to the players in first-person wireframe 3D.

Some Moria players preferred to "role-play" as their fantasy personas instead of merely playing the game.

== Gameplay ==
Screenshot of gameplay, running in the CYBIS system

Moria allows parties of up to ten players to travel as a group and message each other, dynamically generating dungeons (instead of pre-computing them), and featuring a wireframe first-person perspective display.

== Development ==
Moria was developed by Kevet Duncombe and Jim Battin beginning in either 1975 or 1976. (Note: Many sources such as books of video game history have noted the game's development as starting in 1975, but The Friendly Orange Glow states it was 1976, based on a 1997 interview by the author with Duncombe. Duncombe has also claimed in a 2016 interview that the first version was written "around 1975 or 1976".) The game was later given a copyright date of 1978. It was initially begun as a top-down two-dimensional dungeon crawl game, inspired by contemporary PLATO game dnd, which was developed beginning in 1975, and others such as Orthanc (1978). Moria was one of several Dungeons & Dragons-inspired games on the PLATO network developed in the late 1970s. Although both developers had played other games based on works by J. R. R. Tolkien or Dungeons & Dragons, Duncombe had never read or played either. During development, Battin suggested converting the game into a 3D game, inspired by other early 3D PLATO games such as Panther, Spasim, and Airfight. The name Moria was suggested by Dnd developer Dirk Pellett.

An update was made to the game in 1984, with the copyright date changed to match. Moria, like all other PLATO programs, was originally monochrome. In an effort to "modernize" the lessons, color was added by an intern in 1994 at University Online after the CYBIS system and its content was sold to them. CYBIS (short for CYber-Based Instruction System) was the new name for PLATO after CDC sold the trademark to The Roach Organization in 1989.

== See also ==
- Avatar (PLATO video game)

== Sources ==
- Moria at cyber1.org, where the game can be played
- Fun with PLATO at Armchair Arcade
