= Talkomatic =

First multi-user online chat system

- Original authors: Doug Brown; David R. Woolley
- Release: November 26, 1973; 52 years ago
- Written in: TUTOR (original); JavaScript (web versions)
- Platform: PLATO
- Type: Online chat system
- License: MIT License (2024 version)
- Website: classic.talkomatic.co

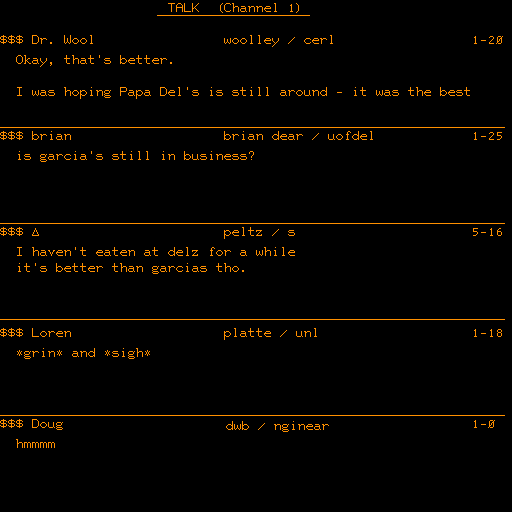
Recreation screenshot of the original Talkomatic interface on the PLATO system.

Talkomatic is an online chat system that enables real-time text communication among small groups. Each participant occupies a dedicated section of the screen, with messages appearing character-by-character as they are typed. Developed in 1973 by Doug Brown and David R. Woolley on the PLATO system at the University of Illinois, Talkomatic is recognized as one of the first multi-user chat systems, predating Internet Relay Chat (IRC) by 15 years and CompuServe's CB Simulator by seven years.

The system played a significant role in the development of online communities and influenced subsequent collaborative software, including Lotus Notes. After the original PLATO implementation was discontinued in the mid-1980s, Brown and Woolley released a web-based version in 2014. Following a temporary shutdown in 2024, the system was revived as an open-source project.

== History ==
=== Development on PLATO ===
In 1973, Doug Brown, a programmer working on the PLATO system at the University of Illinois, developed a prototype for group chat communication. David R. Woolley, who had previously created PLATO Notes (an early bulletin board system), collaborated with Brown to expand the program into a multi-room system with privacy controls. The finished system supported six concurrent channels, each accommodating up to five active participants, with additional users able to monitor conversations without participating.

Talkomatic distinguished itself from earlier communication systems through its character-by-character transmission protocol. Unlike conventional messaging systems that displayed only completed messages, Talkomatic showed each keystroke as it occurred, allowing participants to observe messages being composed in real time. The interface divided the screen into horizontal sections, assigning each participant a dedicated space. This spatial organization prevented the message collision that would occur if multiple users typed into a shared area simultaneously.

Whether Talkomatic was the first multi-user chat system remains a subject of historical debate. The Party Line feature of the Emergency Management Information Systems And Reference Index (EMISARI), developed by Murray Turoff for the US Office of Emergency Preparedness in 1971, has also been identified as an early multi-user communication system. However, Talkomatic's wider deployment and influence on subsequent systems have given it prominence in the history of online chat.

=== PLATO community ===
Talkomatic quickly became one of the most popular applications on PLATO, alongside PLATO Notes and various educational games. The system contributed to the formation of one of the earliest significant online communities, which remained active through the mid-1980s as PLATO expanded from its original University of Illinois base to commercial and educational sites worldwide. Between September 1978 and May 1985, the CERL PLATO system logged 10 million hours of use, with approximately one-third devoted to the Notes application and a significant portion to Talkomatic.

The success of Talkomatic inspired the development of Term-talk, a two-person communication program that allowed private conversations between any two PLATO users without requiring them to exit their current applications. Users accessed Term-talk by pressing the TERM key and typing "talk," creating an early form of instant messaging.

The original PLATO-based Talkomatic operated until the mid-1980s, when the commercial viability of Control Data Corporation's PLATO systems declined and many installations were shut down.

== Cultural influence and legacy ==
=== Influence on collaborative software ===
Several PLATO alumni went on to create influential collaborative software systems inspired by their experiences with PLATO's communication tools. Most notably, Ray Ozzie, who worked at the Computer-based Education Research Laboratory (CERL) at the University of Illinois in the late 1970s, experienced both Talkomatic and PLATO Notes firsthand. This experience directly informed his later work.

In the 1980s, Ozzie, along with Tim Halvorsen and Len Kawell (also PLATO alumni), developed Lotus Notes, a collaborative software platform that became one of the most successful commercial products in the groupware market. Lotus Notes incorporated concepts from PLATO's communication systems, including threaded discussions reminiscent of PLATO Notes and real-time messaging capabilities inspired by systems like Talkomatic.

=== Naming of Talko ===
In 2014, Ozzie named his new smartphone messaging application Talko after Talkomatic, explicitly acknowledging the influence of his time on the PLATO system. Talko launched in September 2014 as a voice messaging application with visual voice transcription. Microsoft acquired the company in December 2015 for an undisclosed sum and subsequently integrated some of its technology into Microsoft Teams before discontinuing the standalone application in March 2016.

=== Historical significance ===
Talkomatic demonstrated several concepts that became standard in later online communication systems, including dedicated user interface spaces, real-time message transmission, channel-based organization, and moderation through user credentials. The system's influence extended beyond its technical features to demonstrate the social dynamics of online communities, including the emergence of community standards, the need for moderation, and the development of relationships that extended beyond the digital space.

== Web implementations ==
=== 2014 relaunch ===
On March 11, 2014—exactly 41 years after the original system's creation—Brown and Woolley released a web-based version of Talkomatic. The WebSocket protocol, standardized in 2011, enabled the recreation of Talkomatic's real-time character transmission without requiring specialized software or browser plugins.

This implementation retained the core character-by-character transmission feature while removing technical constraints of the original PLATO system. The maximum channel count was eliminated, and the system could scale to accommodate significantly more concurrent users than the original six channels.

The web version evolved through several iterations. Version 2.0, released in May 2014, introduced private rooms with password protection. Version 3.0, launched in July 2015, added Facebook login integration for user authentication. In January 2018, Steve Zoppi re-hosted the service and released Version 3.2 with technical improvements. During this period, Ray Ozzie donated three domain names (talkomatic.com, talkomatic.org, and talkomatic.net) to support the preservation effort. By 2018, the service operated across multiple domains alongside Brown and Woolley's original talko.cc.

Version 4, released on March 11, 2018, completed the feature set by implementing semi-private rooms (channels requiring access codes) and expanding browser compatibility to support a wider range of modern devices and screen resolutions.

=== 2024 shutdown and open-source revival ===
The original web implementation became unavailable for public use on March 14, 2024. This occurred mainly due to a sudden spike in user activity. During this time, multiple online influencers, such as Xander Keller, who goes under the name of yikes uploaded videos about the platform, thus resulting in many joining and overloading the servers. The person running these servers, Steve Sjzoppi, couldn't handle the influx in users and was forced to shut it down.

In June 2024, software developer Mohd Mahmodi released Talkomatic Classic, an open-source implementation of the system. The codebase was published on GitHub under the MIT License, allowing community contributions and ensuring the preservation of the system's functionality. Mahmodi's implementation maintains the character-by-character real-time typing interface that defined the original system while using modern web technologies including Node.js, Express.js, and Socket.IO. The system supports public, semi-private (access code-protected), and private rooms, along with mobile device compatibility and voice-to-text input on supported platforms.

== Technical features ==
=== Interface and interaction model ===
Talkomatic's interface employs a spatial division uncommon in modern chat systems. The screen is partitioned into distinct horizontal sections, with each participant assigned a dedicated area. This design allows multiple users to type simultaneously without their messages interfering with each other—a significant advantage over shared input areas that would create jumbled text when multiple users typed concurrently.

Messages appear character-by-character as users type, rather than only after completion. This transmission method creates a conversational dynamic closer to spoken dialogue, where participants can observe each other's thought processes and typing corrections in real time. Users can see when others pause, backspace to revise their messages, or type rapidly in excitement.

The system supports optional message layouts, with implementations offering both horizontal divisions (traditional PLATO style) and vertical columns to accommodate different screen sizes and user preferences.

=== Access control and moderation ===
The original PLATO-based Talkomatic operated within a credentialed environment. The PLATO system categorized users as authors, instructors, students, or "multiples"—the latter being the most anonymous classification. Each category belonged to managed groups, with group administrators holding authority to suspend or revoke credentials for inappropriate conduct. System administrators could restrict access by multiples to specific applications, including Talkomatic, effectively preventing completely anonymous participation.

The 2014 web implementation removed credential requirements to enable broader public access. To address abuse enabled by anonymity, Version 4 introduced a democratic moderation system for rooms with three or more participants. Users could vote to remove participants whose conduct they deemed inappropriate. If more than half the room's participants voted against an individual, that person was automatically ejected.

The 2024 open-source implementation includes moderation features and user blocking capabilities to maintain community standards without requiring the complex credential system of the original PLATO environment.

=== Room types ===
Talkomatic implementations have supported three types of communication spaces:

- Public rooms are visible to all users and allow anyone to join. These spaces enable spontaneous conversation between strangers, similar to public channels on IRC or Discord.
- Semi-private rooms require an access code to enter but remain visible in the room listing. These spaces allow groups to organize conversations while maintaining some accessibility.
- Private rooms are hidden from public listings and require explicit invitation. These spaces enable confidential discussions or small group collaboration.

The original PLATO implementation limited channels to five active participants due to screen size constraints, though additional users could monitor conversations passively. Web implementations removed this restriction, allowing room sizes to scale based on technical capacity rather than interface limitations.

== See also ==
- PLATO (computer system)
- Internet Relay Chat
- Instant messaging
- Computer Supported Cooperative Work
- History of the Internet
