= Regency Systems R2C =

Color version of the 2nd Z80-based microcomputer produced by Regency Systems

The R2C was the color version of the 2nd Z80-based microcomputer produced by Regency Systems of Champaign, Illinois, the first being the RC1. The RC1 had a high resolution display and dual 8-inch floppy disk drives. It was essentially a standalone PLATO environment, adapting the TUTOR language and environment. The company was founded by David Eades, a real-estate agency owner, and Paul Tenczar, creator of the TUTOR language.

The R2C supported an Ethernet network and a hard drive. The introduction of the IBM AT, with 16-bit processor, hard drive, and EGA display, sparked a change in direction for the company away from hardware.
