= Gabriele Kotsis =

Austrian university teacher

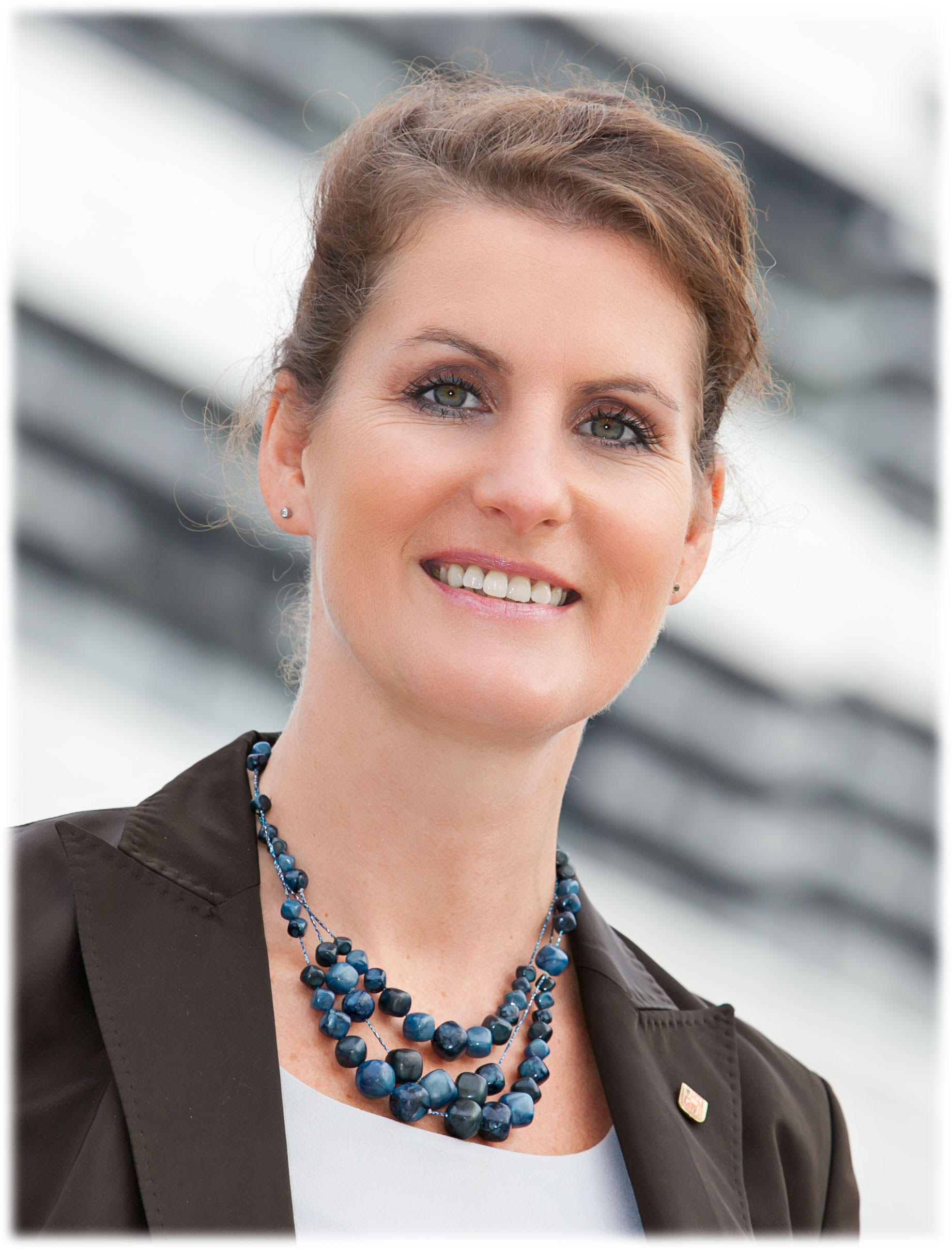
- Gabriele Kotsis in 2014
- Born: 29 October 1967 (age 59); Vienna, Austria
- Citizenship: Austrian
- Education: University of Vienna (MSc, PhD)
- Awards: ACM Distinguished Member (2014); Heinz Zemanek Award (1996)
- Scientific career
- Fields: Computer science
- Workplaces: Johannes Kepler University Linz
- Thesis: Workload Modeling for Parallel Processing (1995)
- Doctoral advisor: Günter Haring
- Website: www.jku.at/institut-fuer-telekooperation/ueber-uns/team/gabriele-kotsis/

Gabriele Kotsis (born 29 October 1967, Vienna, Austria) is an Austrian computer scientist. She is full professor in computer science at Johannes Kepler University (JKU), Linz, Austria, while leading the Department of Telecommunication and the division of Cooperative Information Systems. She was vice-rector for Research and the Advancement of Women, and longstanding chairwoman of Universities Austria's Policy Committee on Research. She is an ACM Distinguished Member and elected president of the Association for Computing Machinery (ACM).

== Early life and education ==
Gabriele Kotsis received her master's degree in business informatics (1986–1991) at the University of Vienna and finished her doctoral studies in social- and economic sciences (1992–1995) at the University of Vienna, graduating two times with distinction. In 2000, she habilitated in Informatics at the University of Vienna. She received scientific recognition early on: her master's thesis Interconnection Topologies and Routing for Parallel Processing Systems at the University of Vienna was honored with a student sponsorship award of the Austrian Computer Society. Furthermore, her PhD dissertation Workload Modeling for Parallel Processing was honored with the prestigious Heinz Zemanek Award in 1996.

== Career and research ==
Already during her doctoral studies, she took a job as a university assistant at the Department of Applied Informatics and Information Systems at the University of Vienna (1991–2001). She worked as a guest professor at the Department of Information Processing and Information Economy at the Vienna University of Economics and Business (2001–2002). In 2002, she was a guest professor at the Department of Informatics at the Copenhagen Business School in Denmark and the Department of Telecooperation at the JKU, before she was appointed as professor of informatics. In the same year, she was one of the co-founding chairs of the working group for professors in computer science within the Austrian Computer Society (OCG), of which she was the first female President from 2003 to 2007. In addition to her two-term presidency at OCG, Kotsis takes an active role in the Editorial board of the OCG Book Series, in the working group Fem-IT (Association of Female University Professors in IT) and in the OCG award committee.

From 2007 to 2015, she served as vice-rector for Research at JKU. Her responsibilities included the development of R&D strategies and policies in the university, coordination and interaction with national and international governmental organizations and funding bodies, and the establishment of collaborations with other research organizations and business partners.

Since 2016, Gabriele has been JKU's representative in the ASEA-UNINET academic research network, which promotes cooperation among European and south-East Asian public universities. Her active involvement in this network led to her nomination and election as president for the current period, February 2019 to July 2020.

Kotsis is a founding member of the ACM Europe Council, serving at the council from 2008 to 2016. In 2014, she became an ACM Distinguished Member for her contributions to workload characterization for parallel and distributed systems and for the founding of ACM Europe. In 2016, she received an award in appreciation of her accomplishments regarding the ACM WomEncourage conference series. As of 2016, she is an elected Member-at-Large of the ACM council. She served as President of ACM for the term July 1, 2020 to June 30, 2022.

She is a member of the Austrian Center for Parallel Computation (ACPC), the Austrian Computer Society (OCG) and Distinguished Scientist of the Association for Computing Machinery (ACM).

== Honors and awards ==
- 2020 – ACM President
- 2016 – Member of the Board of Trustees, University of Klagenfurt
- 2016 – ACM Recognition of Service Award, in appreciation of contributions to ACM. Chair of WomEncourage 2016
- 2016 – IFIP EGOV-ePart 2016 Meritorious Paper Award, for the paper "Making Computers Understand Coalition and Opposition in Parliamentary Democracy"
- 2015 – Emerald Highly Commended Paper Award, International Journal of Pervasive Computing and Communications
- 2014 – ACM Distinguished Member
- 2013 – iiWAS Best Short Paper Award
- 2009 – iiWAS Decennial Award, in recognition of her outstanding scientific, didactic and organizational contributions to the @WAS organization and the iiWAS and MoMM conferences series
- 2006 (September) – Expert of the Month, Federal Ministry for Transport, Innovation and Technology
- 2000 – OPNET / Mil3 Distinguished Paper Award, International Conference on Application and Network Performance
- 1996 – Heinz Zemanek-Preis, Austrian Computer Society Award for outstanding scientific publications in computer science
- 1992 – OCG-Förderpreis, Austrian Computer Society Award for Diploma Theses

== Selected publications ==
Her publications include:

- Al Zubaidi-Polli, Anna M.; Anderst-Kotsis, Gabriele (2018), "Conceptual Design of a hybrid Participatory IT supporting in-situ and ex-situ collaborative text authoring", iiWAS, ACM, ISBN 978-14503-6479-9, 243–252
- Steinbauer, Matthias; Anderst-Kotsis, Gabriele (2016), "DynamoGraph: extending the Pregel paradigm for large-scale temporal graph processing", in International Journal of Grid and Utility Computing (IJGUC), 7 (2), Inderscience, 141–151, ISSN 1741-847X.
- Bachmayer, Sabine; Lugmayr, Artur; Kotsis, Gabriele (2010), "Convergence of collaborative web approaches and interactive TV program formats", International Journal of Web Information Systems, 6 (1), pp. 74–94. doi:10.1108/17440081011034493
- Kotsis, Gabriele; Khalil-Ibrahim, Ismail (2008), "The Web Goes Mobile: Can We Keep the Pace?", Proceedings CISIS 2008 (The Second Int. Conf. on Complex, Intelligent and Software Intensive Systems, 4–7 March 2008, Barcelona, Spain), IEEE Computer Society, 240–246, ISBN 0-76953109-1
- van der Heijden, Hans; Kotsis, Gabriele; Kronsteiner, Reinhard (July 2005), "Mobile recommendation systems for decision making‚ on the go". In International Conference on Mobile Business (ICMB'05) (pp. 137–143). IEEE.
- Ibrahim, Ismail K.; Kronsteiner, Reinhard; Kotsis, Gabriele (2005), "A semantic solution for data integration in mixed sensor networks", Computer Communications, 28 (3), 1564–1574.
- Hlavacs, Helmut; Hotop, Ewald; Kotsis, Gabriele (2000), "Workload Generation in OPNET by User Behaviour Modelling", OPNETWORK 2000, Awarded with the Distinguished Paper Award
- Kotsis, Gabriele; Kacsuk, Peter (2000), "Distributed and Parallel Systems: From Instruction Parallelism to Cluster Computing", DAPSYS2000, Kluwer International Series in Engineering and Computer Science, 567, Kluwer Academic Publishers, ISBN 0-7923-7892-X
- Bullnheimer, Bernd; Kotsis, Gabriele; Strauß, Christine (1998), "Parallelization Strategies for the Ant System", In: De Leone R., Murli A., Pardalos P.M., Toraldo G. (eds) High Performance Algorithms and Software in Nonlinear Optimization. Applied Optimization, 24, Springer, Boston, MA
- Kotsis, Gabriele; Krithivasan, Kamala; Raghavan Serugudi (1997), "Generative Workload Models of Internet Traffic", Proceedings of the ICICS Conference, 1, 152–156, Singapore, IEEE
- A. Ferscha, G. Kotsis (1991) Eliminating Routing Overheads in Neural Network Simulation Using Chordal Ring Interconnection Topologies, Proc. of the Neuro-Nîmes 91, 4th Int. Conf. on Neural Networks and their Applications, 625–638
