= Meena Mahajan =

Indian computer scientist

- Education: IIT Madras (Ph.D.) and IIT Bombay (B.Tech, M.Tech)
- Awards: [J C Bose National Fellow] (2024)
- Scientific career
- Fields: Theoretical computer science, Computational complexity theory
- Workplaces: Institute of Mathematical Sciences, Chennai

Meena Bhaskar Mahajan is an Indian theoretical computer scientist and a professor at the Institute of Mathematical Sciences, Chennai. Her research includes publications in proof complexity, algebraic circuit complexity, small-space complexity classes, parameterized complexity, and algorithms for planar graphs.

== Education and career ==
Mahajan is originally from Mumbai, the daughter of a government accounts officer. She studied computer science at IIT Bombay, receiving a bachelor's degree in 1986 and master's degree in 1988. She completed a Ph.D. at IIT Madras in 1993. Her dissertation, Studies in Language Classes Defined by Time-Varying Cellular Automata, was supervised by Kamala Krithivasan.

After joining the Institute of Mathematical Sciences in Chennai as a postdoctoral researcher in 1993, she took a permanent faculty position at the institute in 1994.

== Recognition ==
Mahajan was elected to the Indian Academy of Sciences in 2022, and to the Indian National Science Academy in 2025. She is an eminent speaker of ACM India. In 2024 she received the J. C. Bose National Fellowship of the Science and Engineering Research Board, now Anusandhan National Research Foundation.
