= Empire (1973 video game) =

1973 video game

Empire is a computer game written for the PLATO system in 1973. It is significant for being quite probably the first networked multiplayer arena shooter-style game. It may also be the first networked multiplayer action game (although Maze War is another possibility for this distinction).

== Gameplay ==
=== Controls and equipment ===
An Empire screenshot from the "PCA vs CERL" tournament held August 18, 1984

Although PLATO terminals had touch panels, they did not have mice, and all control in the game is via typing. Commands involving directions to change course and fire weapons are entered as degree headings, with 0 being to the right, 90 up, 180 left, and 270 down. The "arrow" keys, clustered around "s", could also be used (e.g. "qw" being the same as 113 degrees). PLATO terminals had 512 by 512 pixel monochrome vector CRT display screens, and could use downloadable character sets to display graphics.

=== Object of the game ===
The object of the game is to conquer the galaxy. This galaxy contains 25 planets and 4 races. The races were the Federation, Romulans, Orions, and (originally) Klingons. The fourth race was changed to Kazari, just prior to publication because the game authors were worried about copyright infringement. In 1991, the fourth race name was changed back to Klingon on the NovaNET system, but remained Kazari on the CDC systems.

Each team is given three adjacent planets as their home system. Each home system is located towards one corner of the map, which was many screens in size, and thus has two other teams relatively nearby. There are two neutral worlds between each team and its two neighbors, and five more neutral worlds in the middle of the galaxy. Each planet given to a team contains 50 armies at the start of the game, while the neutral planets start off with 25 self-ruled armies.

Up to 30 players could be in the game at once, with no more than 15 players on a team. Each player is given a starship to pilot. Players dogfight each other, destroy enemy armies by bombing them, beam up friendly armies to transport them, and beam down armies to take over planets. The ships of each race have slightly different capabilities; Orion ships have the weakest weapons but are fast, Roms have the strongest weapons, but are the slowest, and Fed and Kazari ships have medium speed and strength. (In the VAX Conquest variant, which features engine and weapons temperature statistics, Federation ships have the highest overall speed; Klingon weapons do the most damage; Orions can "cruise" at a faster speed than others without engine overheat; and Romulans can fire weapons more often without weapon systems overheating.)

Ships have two kinds of weapons: phasers and photon torpedoes. Phasers fire in a cone shape and do damage immediately, while torpedoes take some time to reach their target and can be dodged. Torpedoes can also be detonated before they strike. When a player is killed, they resurrect in a new ship in their home system, or in any home system that has been conquered by their team.

=== Limitations and strategies ===
Although an action game, Empire can be slow to play, and moves have to be carefully and yet quickly considered. Flying from a team's home space to engage the enemy could take one to two minutes, and bombing a planet with fifty armies could take five to ten minutes. A game might take many hours, or even days, as players come and go. Yet, in intense dogfighting conditions, players have been known to type as quickly as 20 keys per second (as fast as the system would take them).

Original PLATO terminals were connected to the host system with a 1200 baud connection, and the host computers were quite slow by current standards. Since an update of the screen could take one to two seconds with a lot of ships and torpedoes on the screen, players were allowed to decide when their screen updated, but could not delay this action more than 10 seconds, or execute more than a certain number of commands before an update was forced. The position of each ship was updated only when its player updated his screen, which permitted ships to discontinuously hop or "hyperjump". Conversely, torpedo locations updated whenever any player in the game updated their screen, so their movements were effectively continuous.

This simple game mechanic, forced upon the designers by the limitations of the terminal and the central computer, paradoxically gave Empire a great deal of tactical depth by making it a limited-information game. For example, a player, seeing torps launched towards him, could wait without replotting until they were about to be hit, then change course towards the attacker, go to maximum speed, and hyperjump over the torps, then fire his own torps. Since the players could only have a limited number of torps active at any time, the original attacker would have to detonate his torps and launch new ones in order to respond. Of course, an experienced player, knowing that this was likely to happen, would likely have already detonated his first cluster of torps and launched a new set, hoping that his opponent would hyperjump right into them—except that the opponent, knowing this, would do something slightly different. The best players could get inside the heads of other players, figure out what they were going to do, influence them to do certain things, and destroy them.

Things were further complicated by the fact that a ship's fuel supply was limited and regenerated fairly slowly; just flying at maximum warp would deplete a ship's fuel supply in minutes. This meant that one had to decide when it was profitable to fire torpedoes, fire phasers, or even to move at all. Orbiting a friendly "Class-M" planet increased the fueling rate, so defenders could unleash a blizzard of torps—but conversely, this meant that they were all in a known location, and a single attacker who hyperjumped just right could unload his torpedo tubes on all the defenders (Torp damage was area-of-effect), "clearing" the planet and racking up multiple kills. This and other aspects of the game were very well balanced.

Game play was also affected by the Plato system's context switching CPU scheduling algorithm. Plato attempted fair allocation of the limited CPU resources available by calculating for each user the ratio of the total CPU time used during a session divided by the total duration of the session. The system would grant extra CPU time to sessions with lower CPU time/session duration ratios at the expense of sessions with higher CPU time/session duration ratios. Empire players would obtain more CPU for game play by logging in hours before commencing game play and leaving the session idle, thereby accumulating a very low CPU used/session duration ratio that would ensure high CPU allocation to the player during game play. Players who did not engage in this practice were burdened with poor game responsiveness due to relative lack of CPU.

Empire IV included Strategic play, where the goal was to take over all planetary systems, thus forming an empire. This was achieved by building up armies on one's friendly planets, expanding to non-controlled planets, bombarding enemy planets, and eventually beaming down armies transported from one's own friendly planets. This all while being attacked by potentially three other teams at many fronts.

== History ==
The first version, Empire I, was written by Iowa State student John Daleske as project coursework for an education class in the Spring of 1973. Silas Warner (later creating Castle Wolfenstein at Muse Software) helped out by providing Daleske with disk space (known as "lesson space" in the PLATO environment). The first version of the game was a strategic turn-based game for a maximum of eight players. Each player was the head of their government, had ships (for both trade and war), industry, and budgets. Players had to keep the budget up to build more ships, maintain industry to help pay for it, provide raw materials to turn into goods, and trade. This was likely the earliest example of an online, multi-player, interterminal computer game. Games prior to this were two player or one player against a computer. Empire I was originally erased and replaced by Empire II but Silas Warner revived it as Conquest.

Empire II, written in the Fall of 1973, was substantially different, much more tactically oriented. Players each captained a starship and could fire torpedoes at each other. Silas Warner liked the earlier version, and with Daleske's permission resurrected it under the name Conquest. The initial versions were written in longhand, with no printouts available as Daleske was at a remote computing center.

In late 1973, Daleske rewrote the game again, creating Empire III in a 36-hour programming blitz, completing the effort in early 1974. This version of the game, with a few minor modifications (newer looping constructs replace branches, and a timing issue has been corrected) may still be played on the Cyber1 PLATO system. In this version of the game, the internal physics are greatly improved, and the player's ship is always shown in the center of the tactical screen. Up to seven teams and fifty players could participate. Players could opt to be in an eighth "rogue" or non-affiliated team.

The game was substantially revised in 1976 by a team led by Chuck Miller and Gary Fritz, including John Daleske and Jim Battin; by 1977, they produced Empire IV, which allowed for live chat between players. In 1981, Steve Peltz wrote a tournament version of the game, which allowed for annual tournaments between teams. These were most often won by the Orion team.

Empire was a very popular game. Usage logs from the PLATO system at the Computer-based Education Research Laboratory (CERL) at UIUC indicate that between 1978 and 1985, users spent about 300,000 hours playing Empire. Empire is still played (as of 2013) on the system at www.cyber1.org.

Empire inspired many derivative games, including Trek82, Trek83, ROBOTREK, Xtrek, and Netrek. Empire was adapted with emailed permission from Chuck Miller and Gary Fritz for the Apple II by Robert Woodhead as a game called Galactic Attack.

PLATO Conquest (based on Empire I) can still (as of the late 1990s) be found on the NovaNET PLATO systems. This version of Conquest was reverse-engineered from the user experience by Anthony Tomasic. In 1982 Jef Poskanzer wrote a version of the space-battle Empire game called Conquest for VAX/VMS computers.
