= PLATO (computer system) =

Mainframe computer system

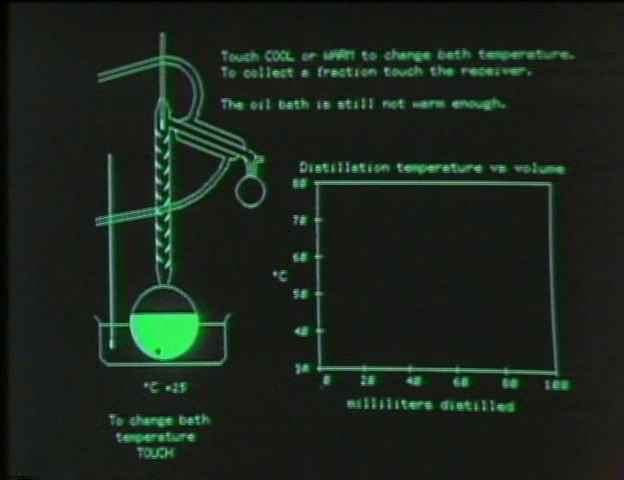
- PLATO running a simulation of fractional distillation
- Developer: University of Illinois
- Release: 1960; 66 years ago
- Final release: PLATO IV / 1972; 54 years ago
- Operating system: NOS
- Platform: ILLIAC I (PLATO I, II), CDC 1604 (PLATO III), CDC 6000 series (PLATO IV)
- Available in: English
- Type: Computer-assisted instruction system

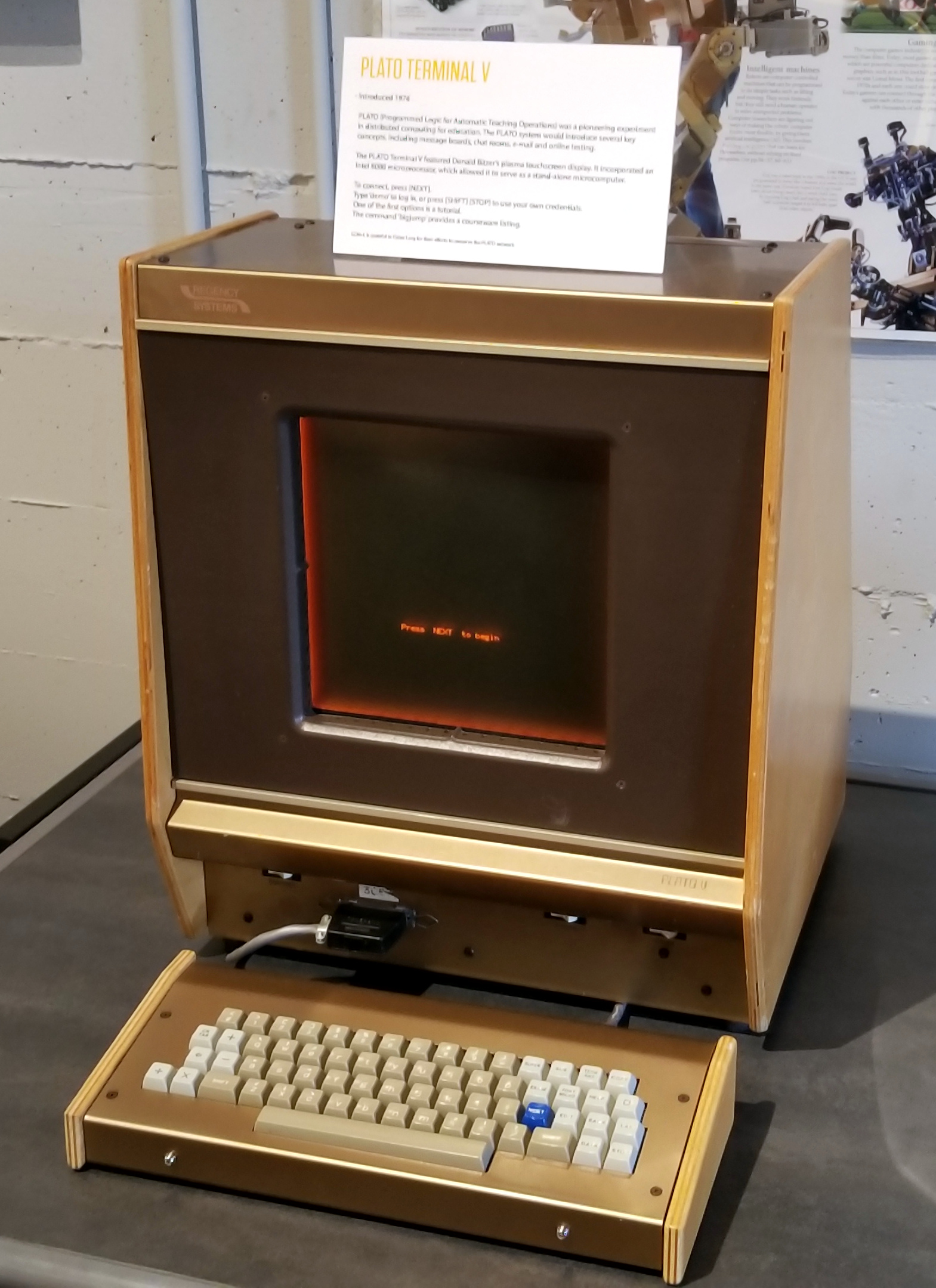
A working PLATO V terminal at the Living Computers: Museum + Labs in 2018

PLATO (Programmed Logic for Automatic Teaching Operations), also known as Project Plato and Project PLATO, was the first generalized computer-assisted instruction system. Starting in 1960, it ran on the University of Illinois's ILLIAC I computer. By the late 1970s, it supported several thousand graphics terminals distributed worldwide, running on nearly a dozen different networked mainframe computers. Many modern concepts in multi-user computing were first developed on PLATO, including forums, message boards, online testing, email, chat rooms, picture languages, instant messaging, remote screen sharing, and multiplayer video games.

PLATO was designed and built by the University of Illinois and functioned for four decades, offering coursework (elementary through university) to UIUC students, local schools, prison inmates, and other universities. Courses were taught in a range of subjects, including Latin, chemistry, education, music, Esperanto, and primary mathematics. The system included a number of features useful for pedagogy, including text overlaying graphics, contextual assessment of free-text answers, depending on the inclusion of keywords, and feedback designed to respond to alternative answers.

Rights to market PLATO as a commercial product were licensed by Control Data Corporation (CDC), the manufacturer on whose mainframe computers the PLATO IV system was built. CDC President William Norris planned to make PLATO a force in the computer world, but found that marketing the system was not as easy as hoped. PLATO nevertheless built a strong following in certain markets, and the last production PLATO system was in use until 2006.

== Innovations ==
Minuet in G major played on the Gooch Synthetic Woodwind, a four-voice square wave synth

PLATO was either the first or an earlier example of many now-common technologies:

- Hardware
  - Plasma display (PLATO IV), c. 1964. Donald Bitzer
  - Touchscreen (PLATO IV), c. 1964. Donald Bitzer
  - Gooch Synthetic Woodwind (music device for the terminal), c. 1972
- Display graphics
  - Charset Editor (bitmapped picture drawing program) storing in downloadable fonts.
  - Show Display Mode (graphics application generator (TUTOR)), 1975.
- Online communities
  - Pad (General-purpose computer message board), 1973
  - Notesfiles (precursor to newsgroups), 1973.
  - Talkomatic (real-time text-based chat, with six rooms each allowing five participants), 1973
  - Term-talk (1:1 chat)
  - Screen software sharing: Monitor Mode, 1974, used by instructors to help students, precursor of Timbuktu.
- Common computer game genres, including many early realtime multi-player games
  - Multiplayer games
    - Spacewar! (Multiplayer space battle game), c. 1969. Rick Blomme
  - Dungeon games
    - dnd (dungeon crawl game), 1974–75. Included the first video game boss.
    - Pedit5, c. 1974, likely the first graphical dungeon computer game.
    - Avatar (60-player 2.5-D graphical Multi-User Dungeon (MUD)), c. 1978.
  - Space combat
    - Empire (30 person multi-player inter-terminal 2-D real-time space simulation), c. 1974
    - Spasim (32-player first-person 3D space battle game), c. 1974
  - Flight simulation: Fortner, Brand (1974), Airfight (3-D flight simulator); this probably inspired UIUC student Bruce Artwick to start Sublogic which was acquired and later became Microsoft Flight Simulator.
  - Military simulations: Haefeli, John (c. 1975), Panther (3-D tank simulation).
  - 3D Maze games: Wallace, Bruce (1975), Build-Up, based on a story by J. G. Ballard, the first PLATO 3-D walkthru maze game.
  - Quest simulation: Think15 (2-D outdoor wilderness quest simulation), c. 1977, like Trek with monsters, trees, treasures.
  - Solitaire: Alfille, Paul (1979), Freecell solitaire, Lockard, Brodie (1981), Mahjong solitaire
- Educational
  - Answer Judging Machinery (set of about 25 commands in TUTOR that made it easy to test a student's understanding of a complex concept).
  - Training systems; Kaven, Luke (1979), The Procedure Logic Simulator (PLS) (intelligent CAI authoring system) an ambitious ICAI programming system featuring partial-order plans, used to train Con Edison steam plant operators.

== History ==
=== Impetus ===
Before the 1944 G.I. Bill that provided free college education to World War II veterans, higher education was limited to a minority of the US population, though only 9% of the population was in the military. The trend towards greater enrollment was notable by the early 1950s, and the problem of providing instruction for the many new students was a serious concern to university administrators. To wit, if computerized automation increased factory production, it could do the same for academic instruction.

The USSR's 1957 launching of the Sputnik I artificial satellite energized the United States' government into spending more on science and engineering education. In 1958, the U.S. Air Force's Office of Scientific Research had a conference about the topic of computer instruction at the University of Pennsylvania; interested parties, notably IBM, presented studies.

=== Genesis ===
Around 1959, Chalmers W. Sherwin, a physicist at the University of Illinois, suggested a computerised learning system to William Everett, the engineering college dean, who, in turn, recommended that Daniel Alpert, another physicist, convene a meeting about the matter with engineers, administrators, mathematicians, and psychologists. After weeks of meetings they were unable to agree on a single design. Before conceding failure, Alpert mentioned the matter to laboratory assistant Donald Bitzer, who had been thinking about the problem, suggesting he could build a demonstration system.

Project PLATO was established soon afterwards, and in 1960, the first system, PLATO I, operated on the local ILLIAC I computer. It included a television set for display and a special keyboard for navigating the system's function menus; PLATO II, in 1961, featured two users at once, one of the first implementations of multi-user time-sharing.

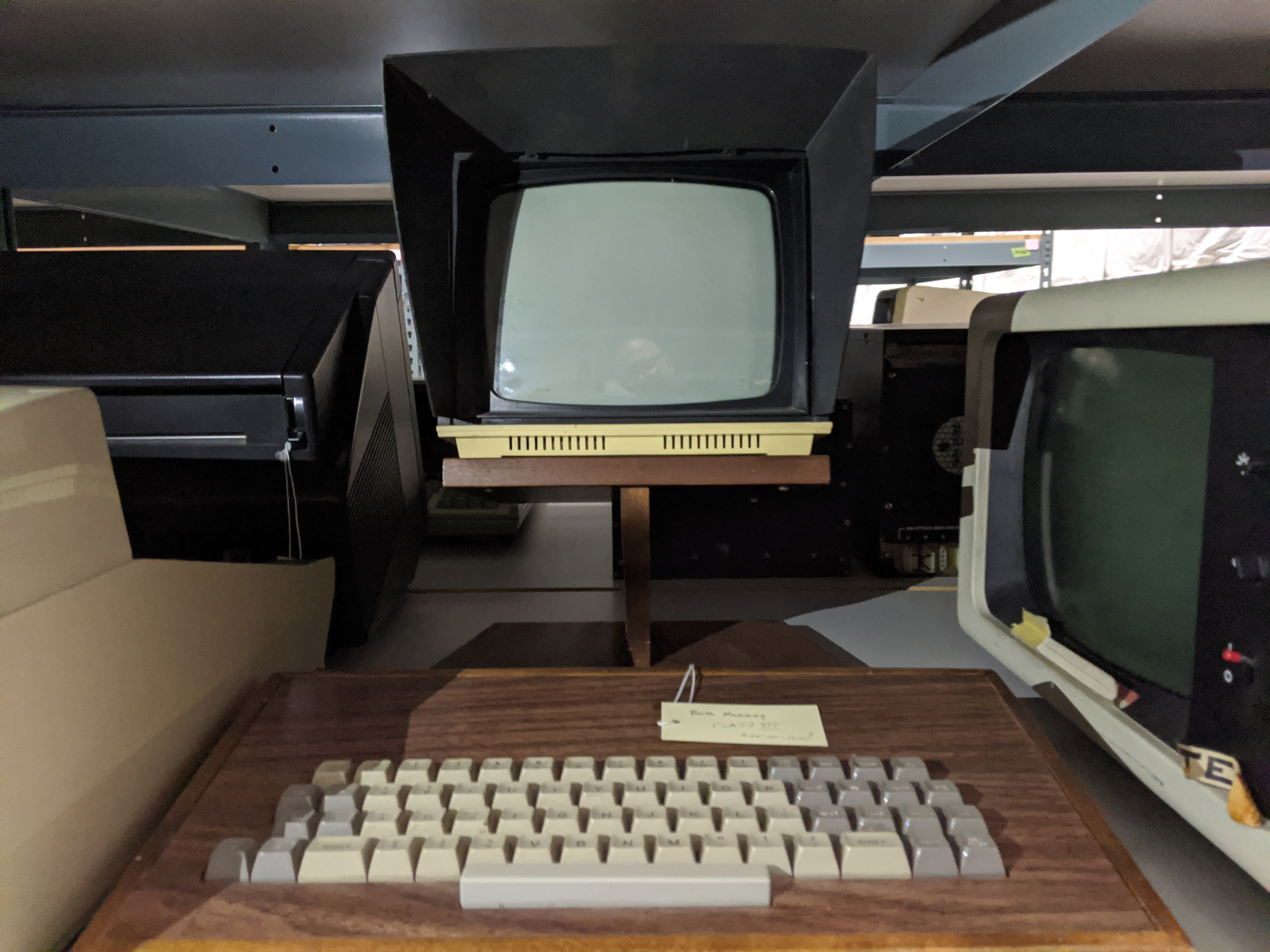
PLATO III terminal

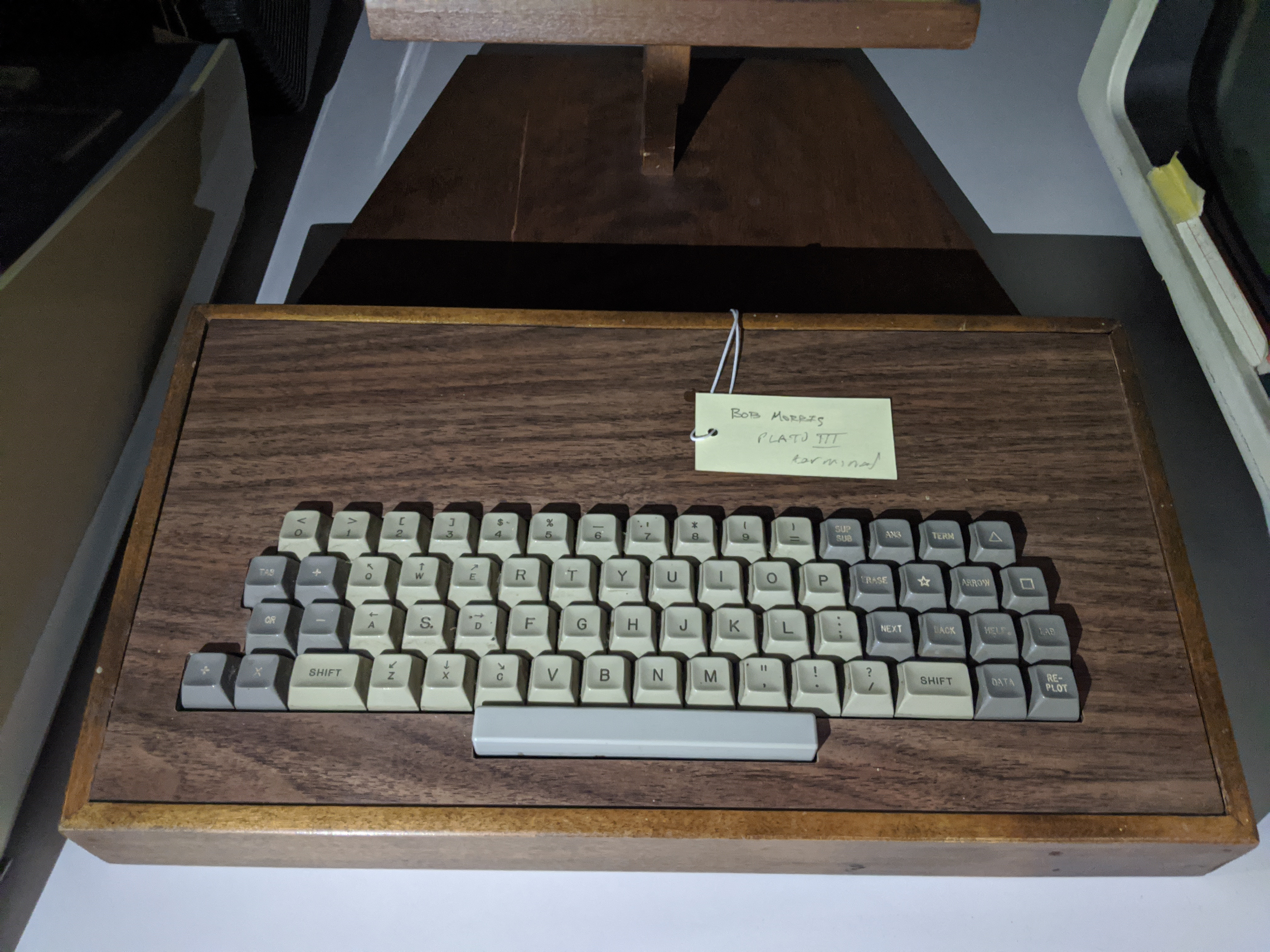
PLATO III keyboard

The PLATO system was re-designed, between 1963 and 1969; PLATO III allowed "anyone" to design new lesson modules using their TUTOR programming language, conceived in 1967 by biology graduate student Paul Tenczar. Built on a CDC 1604, given to them by William Norris, PLATO III could simultaneously run up to 20 terminals, and was used by local facilities in Champaign–Urbana that could enter the system with their custom terminals. The only remote PLATO III terminal was located near the state capitol in Springfield, Illinois at Springfield High School. It was connected to the PLATO III system by a video connection and a separate dedicated line for keyboard data.

PLATO I, II, and III were funded by small grants from a combined Army-Navy-Air Force funding pool. By the time PLATO III was in operation, everyone involved was convinced it was worthwhile to scale up the project. Accordingly, in 1967, the National Science Foundation granted the team steady funding, allowing Alpert to set up the Computer-based Education Research Laboratory (CERL) at the University of Illinois Urbana–Champaign campus. The system was capable of supporting 20 time-sharing terminals.

=== Multimedia experiences (PLATO IV) ===
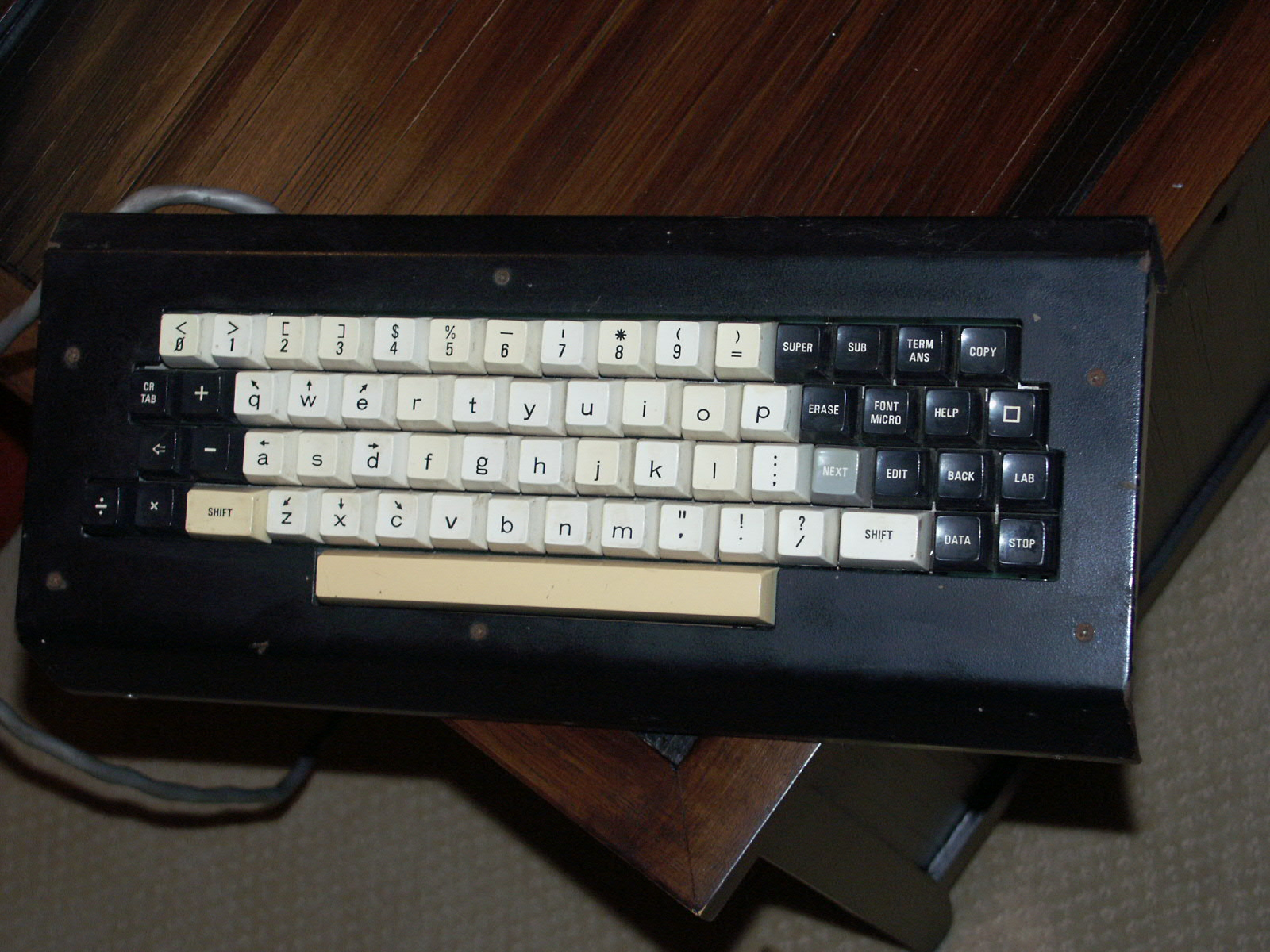
A standard keyboard for a PLATO IV terminal, c. 1976

In 1972, with the introduction of PLATO IV, Bitzer declared general success, saying that the goal of generalized computer instruction was now available to all. The terminals were expensive (about $12,000). The PLATO IV terminal had several major innovations:

- Plasma Display Screen: Bitzer's orange plasma display, incorporated both memory and bitmapped graphics into one display. The display was a 512×512 bitmap, with both character and vector plotting done by hardwired logic. It included fast vector line drawing capability, and ran at 1260 baud, rendering 60 lines or 180 characters per second. Users could provide their own characters to support rudimentary bitmap graphics.
- Touch panel: A 16×16 grid infrared touch panel, allowing students to answer questions by touching anywhere on the screen.
- Microfiche images: Compressed air powered a piston-driven microfiche image selector that permitted colored images to be projected on the back of the screen under program control.
- A hard drive for Audio snippets: The random-access audio device used a magnetic disc with a capacity to hold 17 total minutes of pre-recorded audio. It could retrieve for playback any of 4096 audio clips within 0.4 seconds. By 1980, the device was being commercially produced by Education and Information Systems, Incorporated with a capacity of just over 22 minutes.
- A Votrax voice synthesizer
- The Gooch Synthetic Woodwind (named after inventor Sherwin Gooch), a synthesizer that offered four-voice music synthesis to provide sound in PLATO courseware. This was later supplanted on the PLATO V terminal by the Gooch Cybernetic Synthesizer, which had sixteen voices that could be programmed individually, or combined to make more complex sounds.

Bruce Parello, a student at the University of Illinois in 1972, created the first digital emojis on the PLATO IV system.

=== Influence on PARC and Apple ===
Early in 1972, researchers from Xerox PARC were given a tour of the PLATO system at the University of Illinois. At this time, they were shown parts of the system, such as the Insert Display/Show Display (ID/SD) application generator for pictures on PLATO (later translated into a graphics-draw program on the Xerox Star workstation); the Charset Editor for "painting" new characters (later translated into a "Doodle" program at PARC); and the Term Talk and Monitor Mode communications programs. Many of the new technologies they saw were adopted and improved upon, when these researchers returned to Palo Alto, California. They subsequently transferred improved versions of this technology to Apple Inc.

=== CDC years ===
As PLATO IV reached production quality, William Norris (CDC) became increasingly interested in it as a potential product. His interest was twofold. From a strict business perspective, he was evolving Control Data into a service-based company instead of a hardware one, and was increasingly convinced that computer-based education would become a major market in the future. At the same time, Norris was troubled by the unrest of the late 1960s, and felt that much of it was due to social inequalities that needed to be addressed. PLATO offered a solution by providing higher education to segments of the population that would otherwise never be able to afford a university education.

Norris provided CERL with machines on which to develop their system in the late 1960s. In 1971, he set up a new division within CDC to develop PLATO courseware, and eventually many of CDC's own initial training and technical manuals ran on it. In 1974, PLATO was running on in-house machines at CDC headquarters in Minneapolis, and in 1976, they purchased the commercial rights in exchange for a new CDC Cyber machine.

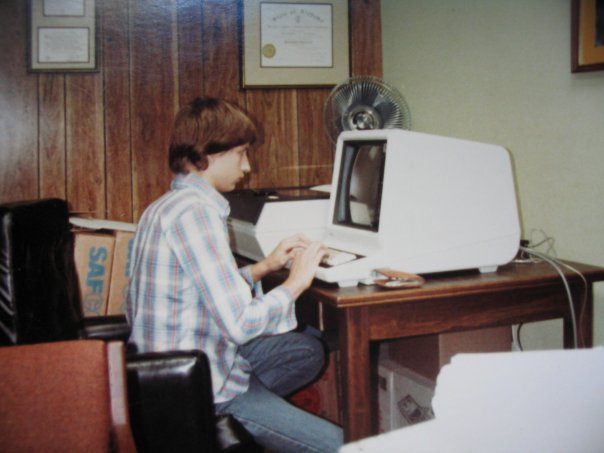
Using the CDC Plato network, c. 1979–1980, with an IST-II terminal

CDC announced the acquisition soon after, claiming that by 1985, 50% of the company's income would be related to PLATO services. Through the 1970s, CDC tirelessly promoted PLATO, both as a commercial tool and one for re-training unemployed workers in new fields. Norris refused to give up on the system, and invested in several non-mainstream courses, including a crop-information system for farmers, and various courses for inner-city youth. CDC even went as far as to place PLATO terminals in some shareholder's houses, to demonstrate the concept of the system.

In the early 1980s, CDC started heavily advertising the service, apparently due to increasing internal dissent over the now $600 million project, taking out print and even radio ads promoting it as a general tool. The Minneapolis Tribune was unconvinced by their ad copy and started an investigation of the claims. In the end, they concluded that while it was not proven to be a better education system, everyone using it nevertheless enjoyed it, at least. An official evaluation by an external testing agency ended with roughly the same conclusions, suggesting that everyone enjoyed using it, but it was essentially equal to an average human teacher in terms of student advancement.

A computerized system equal to a human should have been a major achievement, the very concept for which the early pioneers in CBT were aiming. A computer could serve all the students in a school for the cost of maintaining it, and would not go on strike. However, CDC charged $50 an hour for access to their data center, in order to recoup some of their development costs, making it considerably more expensive than a human on a per-student basis. PLATO was a failure as a profitable commercial enterprise, although it did find some use in large companies and government agencies willing to invest in the technology.

An attempt to mass-market the PLATO system was introduced in 1980 as Micro-PLATO, which ran the basic TUTOR system on a CDC "Viking-721" terminal and various home computers. CDC itself introduced the Model 110 microcomputer running CP/M, capable of accessing PLATO and marketed to education alongside small business. Versions were built for the TI-99/4A, Atari 8-bit computers, Zenith Z-100 and, later, Radio Shack TRS-80, and IBM Personal Computer. Micro-PLATO could be used stand-alone for normal courses, or could connect to a CDC data center for multiuser programs. To make the latter affordable, CDC introduced the Homelink service for $5 an hour.

Norris continued to praise PLATO, announcing that it would be only a few years before it represented a major source of income for CDC as late as 1984. In 1986, Norris stepped down as CEO, and the PLATO service was slowly killed off. He later claimed that Micro-PLATO was one of the reasons PLATO got off-track. They had started on the TI-99/4A, but then Texas Instruments pulled the plug and they moved to other systems like the Atari, who soon did the same. He felt that it was a waste of time anyway, as the system's value was in its online nature, which Micro-PLATO lacked initially.

Bitzer was more forthright about CDC's failure, blaming their corporate culture for the problems. He noted that development of the courseware was averaging $300,000 per delivery hour, many times what the CERL was paying for similar products. This meant that CDC had to charge high prices in order to recoup their costs, prices that made the system unattractive. The reason, he suggested, for these high prices was that CDC had set up a division that had to keep itself profitable via courseware development, forcing them to raise the prices in order to keep their headcount up during slow periods.

=== PLATO V: multimedia ===
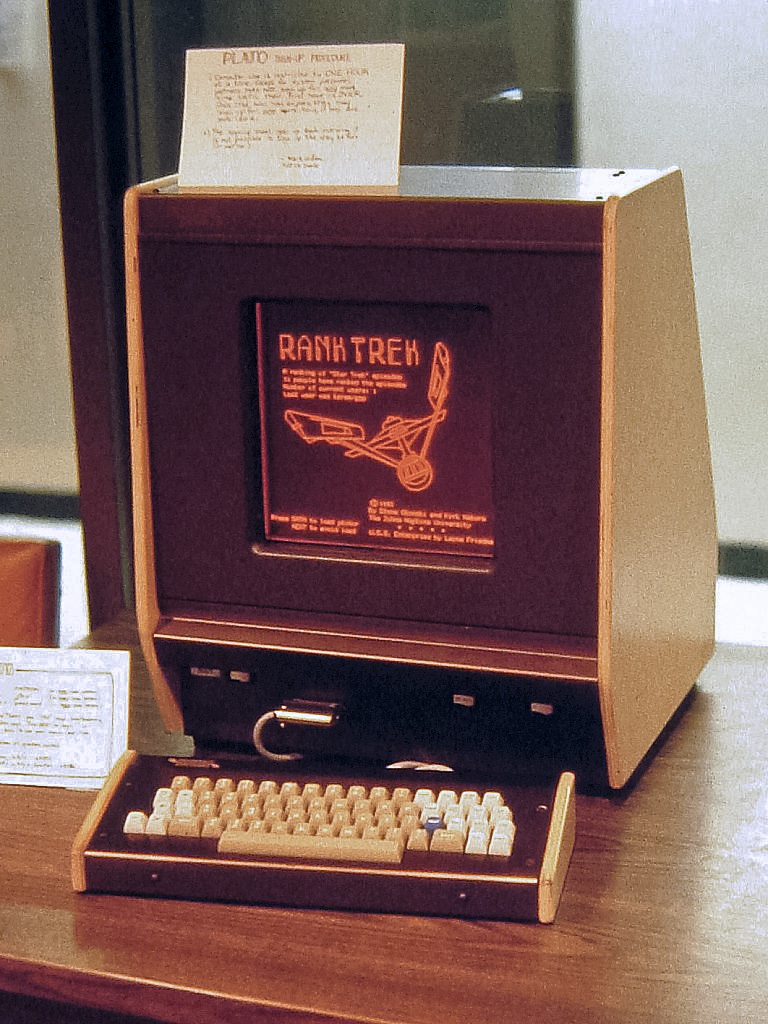
A PLATO V terminal in 1981, displaying RankTrek application, one of the first to combine simultaneous local microprocessor-based computing with remote mainframe computing. The monochromatic plasma display's characteristic orange glow is illustrated. Infrared sensors mounted around the display watch for a user's touch screen input.

Intel 8080 microprocessors were introduced in the new PLATO V terminals. They could download small software modules and execute them locally. It was a way to augment the PLATO courseware with rich animation and other sophisticated capabilities.

== Online community ==
Although PLATO was designed for computer-based education, perhaps its most enduring legacy is its place in the origins of online community. This was made possible by PLATO's groundbreaking communication and interface capabilities, features whose significance is only lately being recognized by computer historians. PLATO Notes, created by David R. Woolley in 1973, was among the world's first online message boards, and years later became the direct progenitor of Lotus Notes.

PLATO's innovations in network computing through its visual interface and instant messaging began with the purpose to teach as opposed to developing a social network. As the system grew through the 1960s, PLATO developers added twenty new lines of code to create a subroutine called CONNECT to communicate between terminals. Through CONNECT, several new PLATO features were created, including the ability to comment on university lectures.

By the early 1970s, some PLATO users began using the system for purposes aside from education. Valarie Lamont, a political science student at the University of Illinois, created a program called Boneyard Creek to present a narrative for the history of the stream and allowed users the opportunity to comment and provide feedback on environmental issues and pollution. Stuart Umpleby, one of Lamont's peers, imagined PLATO as a public communication tool. He contributed to the development of DELPHI, a project that would allow for community-based urban planning and forecasting. DELPHI allowed users to share their thoughts on striking issues, how important they view the issues, and their personal probability on the likelihood of outcomes.

In 1973, Doug Brown developed Talkomatic, a live text chat application where up to five active participants could communicate at once. Due to PLATO's infrastructure, the words could appear live on the user's screens as they were typed, and unlimited people could spectate the conversation at once. This built upon the message boards that Woolley designed for PLATO Notes, as Talkomatic was used for casual conversation. Talkomatic gradually grew to the extent that Term-Talk was developed, where the precursor to direct messaging would behave as a miniature "Talkomatic" between two people. During Nixon's Watergate Scandal, Umpleby attempted to create a discussion group on the event, but was not permitted to continue it under threat of losing NSF funding. Despite the ability for free communication on the platform, speech was still monitored by the University of Illinois, bounding the online community under institutional and educational rules. Students often spent time playing games or talking with each other using these features, adding their own emoticons and typing ellipses in their forums. Some of these features are still present today through iMessage and emojis.

From 1973 to 1975, the 950 terminals of PLATO became capable of online communication. ARPA, the Advanced Research Project Agency, sponsored PLATO to provide computer-based education to military personnel by connecting military sites to the central PLATO system at the University of Illinois. Through these new terminals, even more people were able to communicate using PLATO's technology. While PLATO did not directly influence the development of ARPANET, the work and applicable infrastructure on PLATO were crucial in building ARPANET and the modern internet.

Despite PLATO's community growing through the transition from technical forums and education, forums already had some of the negative features of present-day social media. PLATO's development team was primarily men, and thus the network itself was used by mostly men. Female contributors received poor treatment from men on the platform in the form of verbal abuse or harassment on their character.

The hardware that PLATO was built on also led to the creation of an online gaming community. PLATO's plasma panels were well suited to games, although its I/O bandwidth (180 characters per second or 60 graphic lines per second) was relatively slow. By virtue of 1500 shared 60-bit variables per game (initially), it was possible to implement online games. Because it was an educational computer system, most of the user community were keenly interested in games.

In much the same way that the PLATO hardware and development platform inspired advances elsewhere (such as at Xerox PARC and MIT), many popular commercial and Internet games ultimately derived their inspiration from PLATO's early games. As one example, Castle Wolfenstein by PLATO alum Silas Warner was inspired by PLATO's dungeon games (see below), in turn inspiring Doom and Quake. Thousands of multiplayer online games were developed on PLATO from around 1970 through the 1980s, with the following notable examples:

- Daleske's Empire a top-view multiplayer space game based on Star Trek. Either Empire or Colley's Maze War is the first networked multiplayer action game. It was ported to Trek82, Trek83, ROBOTREK, Xtrek, and Netrek, and also adapted (without permission) for the Apple II computer by fellow PLATO alum Robert Woodhead (of Wizardry fame), as a game called Galactic Attack.
- The original Freecell by Alfille (from Baker's concept).
- Fortner's Airfight, probably the direct inspiration for (PLATO alum) Bruce Artwick's Microsoft Flight Simulator.
- Haefeli and Bridwell's Panther (a vector graphics-based tankwar game, anticipating Atari's Battlezone).
- Many other first-person shooters, most notably Bowery's Spasim and Witz and Boland's Futurewar, believed to be the first FPS.
- Countless games inspired by the role-playing game Dungeons & Dragons, including the original Rutherford/Whisenhunt and Wood dnd (later ported to the PDP-10/11 by Lawrence, who earlier had visited PLATO). and is believed to be the first dungeon crawl game and was followed by: Moria, Rogue, Dry Gulch (a western-style variation), and Bugs-n-Drugs (a medical variation)—all presaging MUDs (Multi-User Domains) and MOOs (MUDs, Object Oriented) as well as popular first-person shooters like Doom and Quake, and MMORPGs (Massively multiplayer online role-playing game) like EverQuest and World of Warcraft. Avatar, PLATO's most popular game, is one of the world's first MUDs and has over 1 million hours of use..

PLATO's communication tools and games formed the basis for an online community of thousands of PLATO users, which lasted for well over twenty years. PLATO's games became so popular that a program called "The Enforcer" was written to run as a background process to regulate or disable game play at most sites and times – a precursor to parental-style control systems that regulate access based on content rather than security considerations.

In September 2006 the Federal Aviation Administration retired its PLATO system, the last system that ran the PLATO software system on a CDC Cyber mainframe, from active duty. Existing PLATO-like systems now include NovaNET and Cyber1.org.

By early 1976, the original PLATO IV system had 950 terminals giving access to more than 3500 contact hours of courseware, and additional systems were in operation at CDC and Florida State University. Eventually, over 12,000 contact hours of courseware was developed, much of it developed by university faculty for higher education. PLATO courseware covers a full range of high-school and college courses, as well as topics such as reading skills, family planning, Lamaze training and home budgeting. In addition, authors at the University of Illinois School of Basic Medical Sciences (now, the University of Illinois College of Medicine) devised a large number of basic science lessons and a self-testing system for first-year students. As the value of a CDC-based solution disappeared in the 1980s, interested educators ported the engine first to the IBM PC, and later to web-based systems.

== Custom character sets ==
In the early 1970s, some people working in the modern foreign languages group at the University of Illinois began working on a set of Hebrew lessons, originally without good system support for leftward writing. In preparation for a PLATO demo in Tehran, that Bruce Sherwood would participate in, Sherwood worked with Don Lee to implement support for leftward writing, including Persian (Farsi), which uses the Arabic script. There was no funding for this work, which was undertaken only due to Sherwood's personal interest, and no curriculum development occurred for either Persian or Arabic. Peter Cole, Robert Lebowitz, and Robert Hart used the new system capabilities to re-do the Hebrew lessons. The PLATO hardware and software supported the design and use of one's own 8-by-16 characters, so most languages could be displayed on the graphics screen (including those written right-to-left).

== University of Illinois School of Music PLATO Project (Technology and Research-based Chronology) ==
A PLATO-compatible music language known as OPAL (Octave-Pitch-Accent-Length) was developed for these synthesizers, as well as a compiler for the language, two music text editors, a filing system for music binaries, programs to play the music binaries in real time, and print musical scores, and many debugging and compositional aids. A number of interactive compositional programs have also been written. Gooch's peripherals were heavily used for music education courseware as created, for example, by the University of Illinois School of Music PLATO Project.

From 1970 to 1994, the University of Illinois (U of I) School of Music explored the use of the Computer-based Education Research Laboratory (CERL) PLATO computer system to deliver online instruction in music. Led by G. David Peters, music faculty and students worked with PLATO’s technical capabilities to produce music-related instructional materials and experimented with their use in the music curriculum.

Peters began his work on PLATO III. By 1972, the PLATO IV system made it technically possible to introduce multimedia pedagogies that were not available in the marketplace until years later.

Between 1974 and 1988, 25 U of I music faculty participated in software curriculum development and more than 40 graduate students wrote software and assisted the faculty in its use. In 1988, the project broadened its focus beyond PLATO to accommodate the increasing availability and use of microcomputers. The broader scope resulted in renaming the project to The Illinois Technology-based Music Project. Work in the School of Music continued on other platforms after the CERL PLATO system shutdown in 1994. Over the 24-year life of the music project, its many participants moved into educational institutions and into the private sector. Their influence can be traced to numerous multimedia pedagogies, products, and services in use today, especially by musicians and music educators.

=== Significant early efforts ===
==== Pitch recognition/performance judging ====
In 1969, G. David Peters began researching the feasibility of using PLATO to teach trumpet students to play with increased pitch and rhythmic precision. He created an interface for the PLATO III terminal. The hardware consisted of (1) filters that could determine the true pitch of a tone, and (2) a counting device to measure tone duration. The device accepted and judged rapid notes, two notes trilled, and lip slurs. Peters demonstrated that judging instrumental performance for pitch and rhythmic accuracy was feasible in computer-assisted instruction.

===== Rhythm notation and perception =====
By 1970, a random access audio device was available for use with PLATO III.

In 1972, Robert W. Placek conducted a study that used computer-assisted instruction for rhythm perception. Placek used the random access audio device attached to a PLATO III terminal for which he developed music notation fonts and graphics. Students majoring in elementary education were asked to (1) recognize elements of rhythm notation, and (2) listen to rhythm patterns and identify their notations. This was the first known application of the PLATO random-access audio device to computer-based music instruction.

Study participants were interviewed about the experience and found it both valuable and enjoyable. Of particular value was PLATO’s immediate feedback. Though participants noted shortcomings in the quality of the audio, they generally indicated that they were able to learn the basic skills of rhythm notation recognition.

These PLATO IV terminal included many new devices and yielded two notable music projects:

==== Visual diagnostic skills for instrumental music educators ====
By the mid-1970s, James O. Froseth (University of Michigan) had published training materials that taught instrumental music teachers to visually identify typical problems demonstrated by beginning band students. For each instrument, Froseth developed an ordered checklist of what to look for (i.e., posture, embouchure, hand placement, instrument position, etc.) and a set of 35mm slides of young players demonstrating those problems. In timed class exercises, trainees briefly viewed slides and recorded their diagnoses on the checklists which were reviewed and evaluated later in the training session.

In 1978, William H. Sanders adapted Froseth’s program for delivery using the PLATO IV system. Sanders transferred the slides to microfiche for rear-projection through the PLATO IV terminal’s plasma display. In timed drills, trainees viewed the slides, then filled in the checklists by touching them on the display. The program gave immediate feedback and kept aggregate records. Trainees could vary the timing of the exercises and repeat them whenever they wished.

Sanders and Froseth subsequently conducted a study to compare traditional classroom delivery of the program to delivery using PLATO. The results showed no significant difference between the delivery methods for a) student post-test performance and b) their attitudes toward the training materials. Students using the computer appreciated the flexibility to set their own practice hours, completed significantly more practice exercises, and did so in significantly less time.

==== Musical instrument identification ====
In 1967, Allvin and Kuhn used a four-channel tape recorder interfaced to a computer to present pre-recorded models to judge sight-singing performances.

In 1969, Ned C. Deihl and Rudolph E. Radocy conducted a computer-assisted instruction study in music that included discriminating aural concepts related to phrasing, articulation, and rhythm on the clarinet. They used a four-track tape recorder interfaced to a computer to provide pre-recorded audio passages. Messages were recorded on three tracks and inaudible signals on the fourth track with two hours of play/record time available. This research further demonstrated that computer-controlled audio with four-track tape was possible.

In 1979, Williams used a digitally controlled cassette tape recorder that had been interfaced to a minicomputer (Williams, M.A. "A comparison of three approaches to the teaching of auditory-visual discrimination, sight singing and music dictation to college music students: A traditional approach, a Kodaly approach, and a Kodaly approach augmented by computer-assisted instruction," University of Illinois, unpublished). This device worked, yet was slow with variable access times.

In 1981, Nan T. Watanabe researched the feasibility of computer-assisted music instruction using computer-controlled pre-recorded audio. She surveyed audio hardware that could interface with a computer system.

Random-access audio devices interfaced to PLATO IV terminals were also available. There were issues with sound quality due to dropouts in the audio. Regardless, Watanabe deemed consistent fast access to audio clips critical to the study design and selected this device for the study.

Watanabe’s computer-based drill-and-practice program taught elementary music education students to identify musical instruments by sound. Students listened to randomly selected instrument sounds, identified the instrument they heard, and received immediate feedback. Watanabe found no significant difference in learning between the group who learned through computer-assisted drill programs and the group receiving traditional instruction in instrument identification. The study demonstrated that use of random-access audio in computer-assisted instruction in music was feasible.

==== The Illinois Technology-based music project ====
By 1988, with the spread of micro-computers and their peripherals, the University of Illinois School of Music PLATO Project was renamed The Illinois Technology-based Music Project. Researchers subsequently explored the use of emerging, commercially available technologies for music instruction until 1994.

==== Influences and impacts ====
Educators and students used the PLATO System for music instruction at other educational institutions including Indiana University, Florida State University, and the University of Delaware. Many alumni of the University of Illinois School of Music PLATO Project gained early hands-on experience in computing and media technologies and moved into influential positions in both education and the private sector.

The goal of this system was to provide tools for music educators to use in the development of instructional materials, which might possibly include music dictation drills, automatically graded keyboard performances, envelope and timbre ear-training, interactive examples or labs in musical acoustics, and composition and theory exercises with immediate feedback. One ear-training application, Ottaviano, became a required part of certain undergraduate music theory courses at Florida State University in the early 1980s.

Another peripheral was the Votrax speech synthesizer, and a "say" instruction (with "saylang" instruction to choose the language) was added to the Tutor programming language to support text-to-speech synthesis using the Votrax.

== Other efforts ==
One of CDC's greatest commercial successes with PLATO was an online testing system developed for National Association of Securities Dealers (now the Financial Industry Regulatory Authority), a private-sector regulator of the US securities markets. During the 1970s Michael Stein, E. Clarke Porter and PLATO veteran Jim Ghesquiere, in cooperation with NASD executive Frank McAuliffe, developed the first "on-demand" proctored commercial testing service. The testing business grew slowly and was ultimately spun off from CDC as Drake Training and Technologies in 1990. Applying many of the PLATO concepts used in the late 1970s, E. Clarke Porter led the Drake Training and Technologies testing business (today Thomson Prometric) in partnership with Novell, Inc. away from the mainframe model to a LAN-based client server architecture and changed the business model to deploy proctored testing at thousands of independent training organizations on a global scale. With the advent of a pervasive global network of testing centers and IT certification programs sponsored by, among others, Novell and Microsoft, the online testing business exploded. Pearson VUE was founded by PLATO/Prometric veterans E. Clarke Porter, Steve Nordberg and Kirk Lundeen in 1994 to further expand the global testing infrastructure. VUE improved on the business model by being one of the first commercial companies to rely on the Internet as a critical business service and by developing self-service test registration. The computer-based testing industry has continued to grow, adding professional licensure and educational testing as important business segments.

A number of smaller testing-related companies also evolved from the PLATO system. One of the few survivors of that group is The Examiner Corporation. Dr. Stanley Trollip (formerly of the University of Illinois Aviation Research Lab) and Gary Brown (formerly of Control Data) developed the prototype of The Examiner System in 1984.

In the early 1970s, James Schuyler developed a system at Northwestern University called HYPERTUTOR as part of Northwestern's MULTI-TUTOR computer assisted instruction system. This ran on several CDC mainframes at various sites.

Between 1973 and 1980, a group under the direction of Thomas T. Chen at the Medical Computing Laboratory of the School of Basic Medical Sciences at the University of Illinois at Urbana Champaign ported PLATO's TUTOR programming language to the MODCOMP IV minicomputer. Douglas W. Jones, A.B. Baskin, Tom Szolyga, Vincent Wu and Lou Bloomfield did most of the implementation. This was the first port of TUTOR to a minicomputer and was largely operational by 1976. In 1980, Chen founded Global Information Systems Technology of Champaign, Illinois, to market this as the Simpler system. GIST eventually merged with the Government Group of Adayana Inc. Vincent Wu went on to develop the Atari PLATO cartridge.

CDC eventually sold the "PLATO" trademark and some courseware marketing segment rights to the newly formed The Roach Organization (TRO) in 1989. In 2000 TRO changed their name to PLATO Learning and continue to sell and service PLATO courseware running on PCs. In late 2012, PLATO Learning brought its online learning solutions to market under the name Edmentum.

CDC continued development of the basic system under the name CYBIS (CYber-Based Instructional System) after selling the trademarks to Roach, in order to service their commercial and government customers. CDC later sold off their CYBIS business to University Online, which was a descendant of IMSATT. University Online was later renamed to VCampus.

The University of Illinois also continued development of PLATO, eventually setting up a commercial on-line service called NovaNET in partnership with University Communications, Inc. CERL was closed in 1994, with the maintenance of the PLATO code passing to UCI. UCI was later renamed NovaNET Learning, which was bought by National Computer Systems (NCS). Shortly after that, NCS was bought by Pearson, and after several name changes now operates as Pearson Digital Learning.

The Evergreen State College received several grants from CDC to implement computer language interpreters and associated programming instruction. Royalties received from the PLATO computer-aided instruction materials developed at Evergreen support technology grants and an annual lecture series on computer-related topics.

== Other versions ==
=== In South Africa ===
During the period when CDC was marketing PLATO, the system began to be used internationally. South Africa was one of the biggest users of PLATO in the early 1980s. Eskom, the South African electrical power company, had a large CDC mainframe at Megawatt Park in the northwest suburbs of Johannesburg. Mainly this computer was used for management and data processing tasks related to power generation and distribution, but it also ran the PLATO software. The largest PLATO installation in South Africa during the early 1980s was at the University of the Western Cape, which served the "native" population, and at one time had hundreds of PLATO IV terminals all connected by leased data lines back to Johannesburg. There were several other installations at educational institutions in South Africa, among them Madadeni College in the Madadeni township just outside Newcastle.

This was perhaps the most unusual PLATO installation anywhere. Madadeni had about 1,000 students, all of them who were original inhabitants i.e. native population and 99.5% of Zulu ancestry. The college was one of 10 teacher preparation institutions in kwaZulu, most of them much smaller. In many ways Madadeni was very primitive. None of the classrooms had electricity and there was only one telephone for the whole college, which one had to crank for several minutes before an operator might come on the line. So an air-conditioned, carpeted room with 16 computer terminals was a stark contrast to the rest of the college. At times the only way a person could communicate with the outside world was through PLATO term-talk.

For many of the Madadeni students, most of whom came from very rural areas, the PLATO terminal was the first time they encountered any kind of electronic technology. Many of the first-year students had never seen a flush toilet before. There initially was skepticism that these technologically illiterate students could effectively use PLATO, but those concerns were not borne out. Within an hour or less most students were using the system proficiently, mostly to learn math and science skills, although a lesson that taught keyboarding skills was one of the most popular. A few students even used on-line resources to learn TUTOR, the PLATO programming language, and a few wrote lessons on the system in the Zulu language.

PLATO was also used fairly extensively in South Africa for industrial training. Eskom successfully used PLM (PLATO learning management) and simulations to train power plant operators, South African Airways (SAA) used PLATO simulations for cabin attendant training, and there were a number of other large companies as well that were exploring the use of PLATO.

The South African subsidiary of CDC invested heavily in the development of an entire secondary school curriculum (SASSC) on PLATO, but unfortunately as the curriculum was nearing the final stages of completion, CDC began to falter in South Africa—partly because of financial problems back home, partly because of growing opposition in the United States to doing business in South Africa, and partly due to the rapidly evolving microcomputer, a paradigm shift that CDC failed to recognize.

=== Cyber1 ===
In August 2004, a version of PLATO corresponding to the final release from CDC was resurrected online. This version of PLATO runs on a free and open-source software emulation of the original CDC hardware called Desktop Cyber. Within six months, by word of mouth alone, more than 500 former users had signed up to use the system.

The PLATO software used on Cyber1 is the final release (99A) of CYBIS, by permission of VCampus. The underlying operating system is NOS 2.8.7, the final release of the NOS operating system, by permission of Syntegra (now British Telecom [BT]), which had acquired the remainder of CDC's mainframe business. Cyber1 runs this software on the Desktop Cyber emulator. Desktop Cyber accurately emulates in software a range of CDC Cyber mainframe models and many peripherals.

Cyber1 offers free access to the system, which contains over 16,000 of the original lessons. The load average of this resurrected system is about 10–15 users, sending personal and notesfile notes, and playing inter-terminal games such as Avatar and Empire (a Star Trek-like game), which had both accumulated more than 1.0 million contact hours on the original PLATO system at UIUC.

== See also ==
- Category:PLATO (computer system) games
- The Mother of All Demos (1968)
