= Kamala Krithivasan =

Indian computer scientist

Kamala Krithivasan (born 1948) is an Indian computer scientist specializing in automata theory, picture languages, and unconventional computing. She is retired as a professor of computer science and engineering at IIT Madras.

== Education and career ==
Krithivasan is originally from Tamil Nadu, where she was born in 1948. After studies at Madras Christian College in Chennai, she completed a Ph.D. at the University of Madras in 1974, with the dissertation Studies in Parallelism and Picture Languages supervised by Rani Siromoney.

She joined the Department of Computer Science & Engineering at IIT Madras in 1975, and retired as a full professor in 2014. Among her doctoral students there was Meena Mahajan, who completed her Ph.D. in 1993.

== Book ==
Krithivasan is the coauthor of the textbook Introduction to Formal Languages, Automata Theory and Computation (with Rama R, Dorling Kinderley, 2009).

== Recognition ==
Krithivasan is a member of the Indian National Academy of Engineering.
