= Panther (1975 video game) =

- Designer(s): John Edo Haefeli
- Platform(s): PLATO System
- Release: 1975
- Genre(s): Vehicle simulation game
- Mode(s): Team play

Panther, a battle tank-driving simulation named after the Panther tank, was one of a handful of early first-person computer games developed by John Edo Haefeli and Nelson Bridwell in 1975 at Northwestern University. The game was developed for the multi-user interactive computer-based education PLATO system and programmed in the TUTOR programming language and utilized scalable vector graphics called linesets. A 1977 development of Panther, with more refined graphics, was named Panzer, the German word for armour and tank.

Version A (1975) of Panther has been restored to active status on the Cyber1 CYBIS-based (a PLATO descendant) system, with direct permission of the developer.

== See also ==
- Battlezone
