= Dnd (1975 video game) =

1975 role-playing video game

dnd
- Title page of version 8 of dnd (running on a PLATO emulator in 2006)
- Developers: Gary Whisenhunt, Ray Wood
- Platform: PLATO system
- Release: 1975
- Genre: Role-playing

The Game of Dungeons, also known as dnd due to its filename, is a computer role-playing game released in 1975. The name dnd is derived from the abbreviation "D&D" from the original tabletop role-playing game Dungeons & Dragons.

dnd was written in the TUTOR programming language for the PLATO system by Gary Whisenhunt and Ray Wood at Southern Illinois University in 1974 and 1975. Dirk Pellett of Iowa State University and Flint Pellett of the University of Illinois made substantial enhancements to the game from 1976 to 1985.

dnd is notable for being the first interactive game to feature what would later be referred to as bosses.

== Gameplay ==
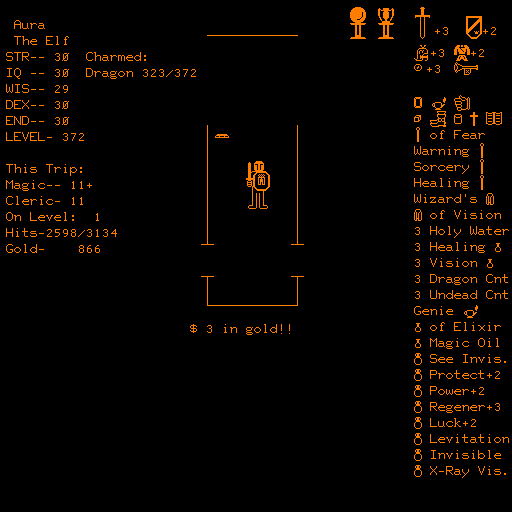
Player about to win dnd: Character is shown in the maze, with both the Orb and Grail (as well as most other magic items and a charmed dragon).

In dnd, players create a character and venture into the multi-level Whisenwood Dungeon (a portmanteau of the authors' last names) in search of two ultimate treasures: the grail and the orb. The game presents players with an overhead view of the dungeon, but also implements many basic concepts of Dungeons & Dragons. The Whisenwood dungeon consists of multiple maze-like levels. As players complete each level, they are allowed to advance to the next, but the players may return to previous levels and leave the dungeon altogether making dnd one of the first video games to use non-linear progression. As players complete levels, they acquire new spells, weapons and items that aid them in their quest to find the ultimate treasures.

Teleporters move characters between dungeon levels. High-level monsters, including a Golden Dragon that guards the Orb, are found at the end of each dungeon. Leaving the dungeon allows one to recuperate and regain spells and return later.

== Sources ==
- "Retro Playing Games", Computer Games, April, 2006, p. 36–37.
