= Picture language =

In formal language theory, a picture language is a set of pictures, where a picture is a 2D array of characters over some alphabet.

For example, the language $L = \left \{ a^{n,n+1} \mid n > 0 \right \}$ defines the language of rectangles composed of the character $a$. This language $L$ contains pictures such as:

$$\begin{pmatrix}a\\a\end{pmatrix},
\begin{pmatrix} a&a\\a&a\\a&a\end{pmatrix},
\begin{pmatrix} a&a&a\\a&a&a\\a&a&a\\a&a&a\end{pmatrix}
\in L$$

The study of picture languages was initially motivated by the problems of pattern recognition and image processing, but two-dimensional patterns also appear in the study of cellular automata and other parallel computing models. Some formal systems have been created to define picture languages, such as array grammars and tiling systems.
