= Maze (1973 video game) =

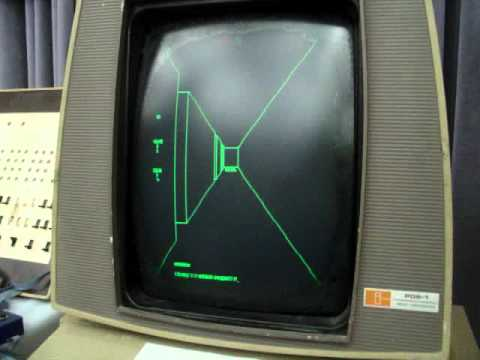
- MIT version of Maze on an Imlac PDS-1D at the Computer History Museum
- Developers: Steve Colley, Greg Thompson, Howard Palmer (NASA version); Greg Thompson, Dave Lebling (MIT version); Jim Guyton, Mike Wahrman (Xerox version)
- Platforms: Computer (Imlac PDS-1, PDP-10, Xerox Alto, Xerox Star)
- Release: 1973
- Genres: First-person shooter, maze
- Modes: Single-player, multiplayer

Maze, also known as Mazewar, and Maze War, (Note: Although the source code for the game refers to itself as Maze, the multiple versions of the game are all inconsistently referred to, even by their creators, as either Maze or Maze War, with multiple variations on spacing and capitalization.) is a 3D multiplayer first-person shooter maze game originally developed in 1973 and expanded in 1974. The first version was developed by high school students Steve Colley, Greg Thompson, and Howard Palmer for the Imlac PDS-1 minicomputer during a school work/study program at the NASA Ames Research Center. By the end of 1973 the game featured shooting elements and could be played on two computers connected together. After Thompson began school at the Massachusetts Institute of Technology (MIT), he brought the game to the school's computer science laboratory in February 1974, where he and Dave Lebling expanded it into an eight-player game using the school's Digital Equipment Corporation PDP-10 mainframe computer and PDS-1 terminals along with adding scoring, top-down map views, and a level editor. Other programmers at MIT improved this version of the game, which was also playable between people at different universities over the nascent ARPANET. Due to the popularity of the game, laboratory managers at MIT both played it while also trying to restrict its use due to the large amount of time students were spending on it. There are reports that the Defense Advanced Research Projects Agency (DARPA) at one point banned the game from the ARPANET due to its popularity.

Thompson and other programmers later developed several other versions of Maze, including a specialized hardware-based game by Thompson and other students as well as a version titled Mazewar by Jim Guyton, Mike Wahrman, and colleagues at Xerox for the Xerox Alto computer. The Xerox version went on to inspire many different takes on the first-person maze game concept in the 1980s and 1990s, released under many different names. Maze is believed to be the first 3D first-person game ever made. It is likely also the earliest example of what was later termed the first-person shooter genre and is considered along with the 1974 space flight simulation game Spasim to be one of the "joint ancestors" of the genre. It has additionally been credited with a variety of other firsts, such as the first level editor, first observer mode and radar, and first avatars, but due to its reliance on specific, expensive computer hardware its direct influence on video games and the first-person shooter genre was limited.

== Gameplay ==
Maze is a multiplayer first-person shooter maze game in which players traverse a flat maze and shoot opponents to score points. The maze layout is represented by a grid of spaces that are either empty or solid and form a flat plane containing walls of equal height. The game contains a default maze layout, but players can provide their own upon starting the game. The player can move forward and backwards between spaces at a rate of one space per key press and can turn left or right or look behind themselves in 90-degree increments. They can also peek around corners, which changes their view as if they had both moved forward and turned, but does not move their player character or allow them to shoot. Other players in the maze are displayed as the letters of their usernames along with an indicator of which direction they are looking; later versions of the game replaced this with the image of an eyeball. Players can also send text messages that are displayed on the screens of other players.

Players can shoot bullets, which rapidly move away from the player and hit other players upon touching them; shooting a player earns the shooter ten points, while being shot loses the target five points. After being shot, the target has two seconds to move away before they can be shot again. The players' scores are displayed next to the view of the maze. Early versions of the game let the player overlay the screen with a top-down view of the maze and their avatar's position in it, while later versions kept the top-down view next to or below the viewscreen at all times. Different versions of the game support different numbers of players; the initial concept only supported two players, while the first main version of the game supported eight players at different terminals, and later variants supported more. In addition to human players, "robot" players can be added to the game, which follow simple algorithms to play the game and slow down if they reach a score limit.

== Development ==
=== Maze ===
The original version of the game was developed by high school students Steve Colley, Howard Palmer, and Greg Thompson in mid to late 1973 during a school work/study program at the NASA Ames Research Center in Silicon Valley, California. The trio were working on creating graphical representations of computational fluid dynamics on Imlac PDS-1 minicomputers, which unlike many other minicomputers at the time included a vector graphics monitor. Colley was developing a method of determining which vertices of a three-dimensional object would not be visible to a viewer and then not drawing them on the screen, thereby displaying a 3D model that looked solid rather than see-through. Colley created a program that could rotate a solid-seeming cube on the screen, and the trio considered how to make a fun program with it, as students at the lab, including Thompson, had previously created versions of arcade games on the computers. Palmer suggested creating a maze that the user could move through, which he and Colley agreed could work if it was a flat maze composed of cubes where the player's view could only be at 90 degree angles. Colley came back to the other two the next day with the basic Maze program, wherein the player had a goal of traversing the maze to its exit. Palmer and Thompson expanded the game to support two players at once using two PDS-1s linked together with a serial cable, and then added the ability for the two players to shoot one another. Colley added the ability to "peek" around corners without moving because he felt it was too easy to be shot while trying to move and then turn. By the end of 1973, all three developers had left NASA to go to college, and they took the Maze program with them. Thompson went to the Massachusetts Institute of Technology (MIT) beginning in the fall of 1973, while Colley and Palmer went to California Institute of Technology and Stanford University, respectively, at the start of 1974. The game has been inconsistently named both Maze and Maze War : while Thompson and Colley, writing in a 2004 retrospective, refer to it as Maze; Palmer refers to it as Maze War. Later versions of the game also use both names inconsistently, although the PDS-1 source code titles itself "Maze".

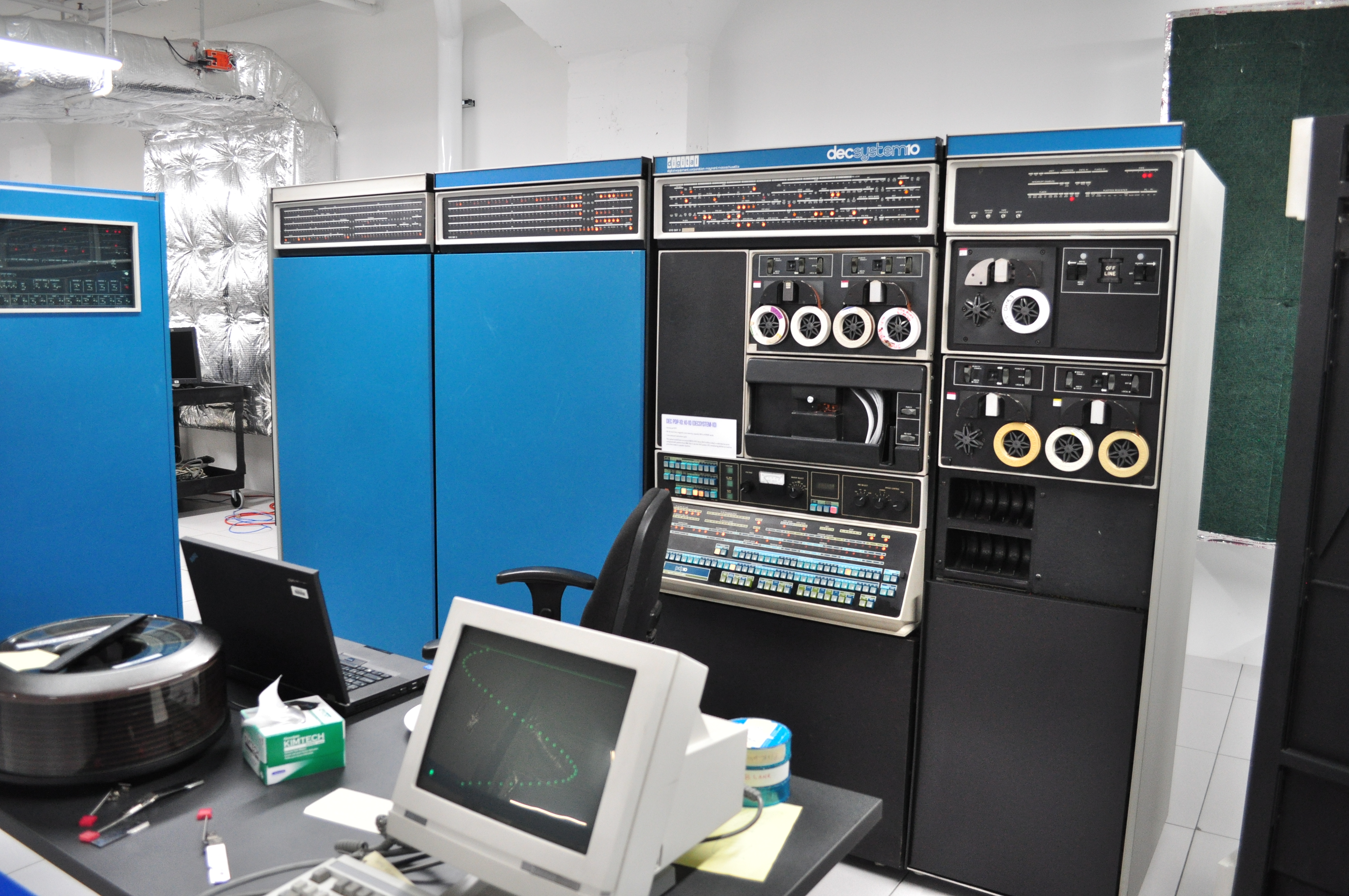
DEC PDP-10 mainframe computer

At MIT, Thompson became involved in computer modeling of dynamic systems at MIT's Project MAC (now the MIT Computer Science and Artificial Intelligence Laboratory), which featured a Digital Equipment Corporation (DEC) PDP-10 mainframe computer networked to eight less-powerful PDS-1s for use as graphical terminals. Thompson brought paper tapes of code for several programs from NASA Ames to MIT in February 1974, including Maze. He and co-worker Dave Lebling decided to recreate and expand the game on the Project MAC computer system. Although Lebling does not recall shooting in the version of the game Thompson showed him, it was soon re-added as the pair greatly expanded the game. The new version of the game used the PDP-10 as a centralized server and supported up to eight players or computer-controlled figures in a maze at once, which was now a 16 by 32 grid. Thompson worked on the PDS-1 code that allowed for more players, the visuals for the bullets, the score-keeping, the ability to see a top-down view of the maze, and a cheat command to move through walls. Lebling, meanwhile, wrote the PDP-10 code to connect all of the players and allow text messaging between terminals, a simple "robot" player that could play the game if there were not enough human players, and a program for players to create their own maze layouts. When he discovered that the robot players were too difficult for some players, he altered the robot players to move slower once they scored a certain number of points. Players were represented in the maze as their three-letter user id, along with an arrow pointing which way they were facing. The game was popular around the lab as well as with other MIT students, who would make accounts on the system just to play Maze. As users had to reserve time on the terminals due to the limited availability, some players would go to the lab in the middle of the night in order to play the game. According to Lebling, Maze was played almost constantly outside of the primary lab hours.

Once Thompson and Lebling converted the game to the PDP-10, other programmers further developed the Maze code. Ken Harrenstien and Charles Frankston rewrote portions of the game to use fewer resources so that the PDP-10 could run more than one instance of the game at the same time. Another researcher, Tak To, wrote a "Maze Watcher" program that ran on an Evans & Sutherland LDS-1 terminal and would display a top-down view of the maze and players in a Maze game for onlookers. Although lab director J. C. R. Licklider and assistant director Al Vezza also played the game, as the lab was funded for serious purposes by the Defense Advanced Research Projects Agency (DARPA) they attempted to limit use of the program. At Vezza's request, Lebling created a "Maze Guncher" program that would run in the background and crash any running Maze games, leading to a continual back and forth as players found ways to avoid the program—or simply turn it off, as the system had no security mechanism to prevent it. Project MAC was part of the nascent ARPANET, the precursor to the Internet, which connected several research institutions around America. Many of these institutions owned PDS-1 terminals, and Maze spread to them as well, allowing multiplayer games across the ARPANET. According to Lebling, the first multiplayer game between institutions was between students at MIT and the University of California, Santa Cruz, although the slow speed of the network left the non-MIT players at a disadvantage. The code for the game was adjusted by Harrenstien and Frankston to account for the extra network delay these cross-country games incurred. Maze was particularly popular at the University of Southern California and Stanford: it was later reported that at one point DARPA banned it from the network as half of the communication traffic between Stanford and MIT was for the game.

=== The Maze Game and Mazewar ===
Photo of Xerox Alto version of the game, featuring the eyeball avatar of another player

Programmers have created several variants of the original Maze game. The first was partially developed by Thompson himself; in the fall of 1976 he took an electrical engineering digital electronics design class, in which he had to do a group project with Mark Horowitz and George Woltman. For the project, they created a hardware system that could run Maze titled "The Maze Game"; Thompson designed the computer hardware, Woltman wrote the software, and Horowitz created the display system. In this version, the maze was a 16 by 16 by 16 cube with no gravity in which the player could move up and down just as they did forward and back, as they found it easier to create hardware that did not need to treat the floor and ceiling differently than other sides. Woltman added robot players like in the computer version of the game, but the trio discovered that since humans found it difficult to visualize where they were in the multi-level maze, the robot players were much harder to beat despite their simple algorithm. They made the difficulty adjustable in response by letting the player adjust the hardware speed, in turn making the robots react slower. As the hardware could not use a computer monitor, the team used oscilloscopes that Horowitz made act as vector displays. After the class, the game remained as an example for future students for several years.

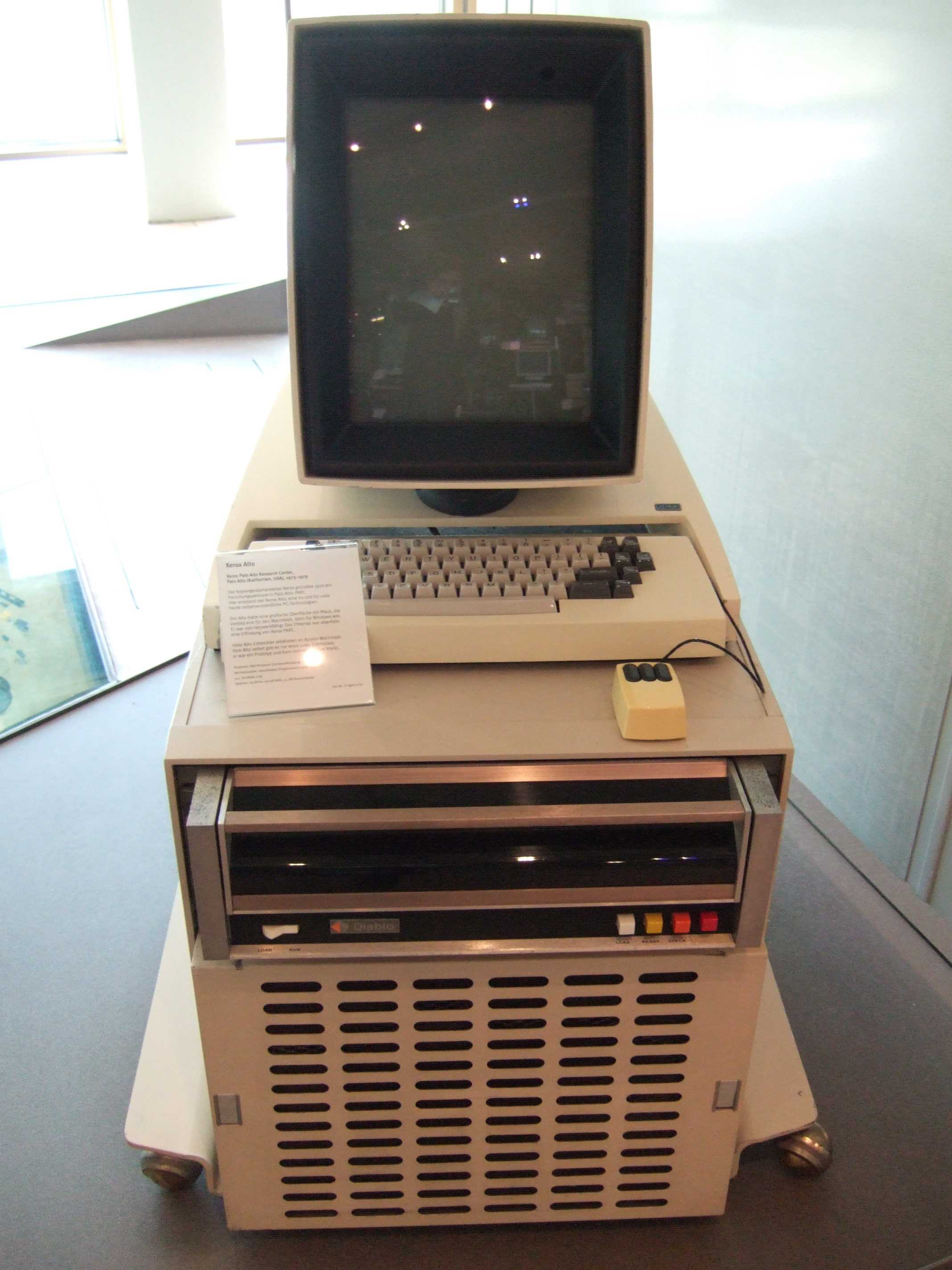
Xerox Alto computer

In 1977, Jim Guyton, a staff member at Xerox's Palo Alto Research Center (PARC), and Mike Wahrman, who worked at RAND Corporation, rewrote Maze for Xerox Alto computers, which could communicate with each other directly using the nascent ethernet networking protocol. Wahrman had played the game at MIT in 1976, and he enthusiastically described it to Guyton while both they worked at RAND using the name "Mazewar". After Guyton moved to Xerox, the pair felt that the game would be suited to the Alto and could be improved on there, and Wahrman got copies of the PDP-10 and PDS-1 code. The pair spent the next year working on the game, which has been inconsistently remembered as Mazewar, MazeWar, Maze War, and Maze Wars. They adapted the graphics from the vector displays of the PDS-1 to the raster displays of the Alto, added the top-down display of the maze and the player's position in it to always be below the first-person view, and changed the networking code to handle multiple systems talking directly to each other without a central PDP-10 server. They rewrote the game entirely in the Mesa programming language and were assisted by several other Xerox employees, including Steven Hayes, Bill Verplank, Jim Sandman, and Bruce Malasky. The text representation of other players was replaced with a large eyeball drawn by Verplank. The game was an immediate hit around the office, and within a few weeks it had spread to other Xerox locations. Eventually, it migrated to MIT, Stanford, and Carnegie Mellon University, which were some of the few non-Xerox locations that owned Xerox Alto computers. Guyton maintained the game for another six months before leaving Xerox for RAND. In 1981, Xerox commercially released a modified version of the Alto as the Xerox Star, and the source code to Mazewar proliferated after it, in turn inspiring further versions of Maze.

== Legacy ==
Maze is believed to be the first 3D first-person game ever made. It is likely also the earliest example of what was later termed the first-person shooter genre; prior confusion over the development timeline of the game has led to it being considered, along with Spasim, an early 1974 space flight simulation game by Jim Bowery, to be one of the "joint ancestors" of the genre. It has additionally been credited with a variety of other firsts, such as level editing due to Lebling's editor, observer mode and radar from the top-down view, and avatars from the representation of other players. Despite its number of firsts, the limited availability of the game due to its reliance on specific, expensive computer hardware meant that it was not a large influence on video games or on the modern first-person shooter genre, which is generally held to have started with Catacomb 3-D in 1991 without direct inspiration from Maze.

The Xerox version of the game was adapted by Christopher Kent for the X Window System at DEC in 1986 as X MazeWars. This version was based directly on the Xerox source code, which Kent, who had first been shown the game at RAND by Guyton, received from a former Xerox employee. In 1987, MacroMind released a version of the game for the Apple Macintosh titled Maze Wars+, which was playable on the AppleTalk local network by up to 30 players. The game featured five different character avatars, including an eyeball similar to that found in the Xerox version of the game, four different types of robot players, additional maze features such as teleporters, and walls made of lines rather than blocks. Advertisements for the game referred to it as "a direct descendant of the well known M.I.T. and Xerox PARC network classics" and at one point listed it as for sale directly by MacroMind for US$49.95. It was followed by Super MazeWars by Callisto for Mac OS in 1992, which was bundled with Macintosh computers for a time.

Several other games based on the Maze concept, with a variety of graphical styles and differences from the original versions, were released in the 1980s and 1990s. These include MIDI Maze for the Atari ST by Xanth Software in 1987, which was ported as Faceball 2000 to the Game Boy, Super Nintendo Entertainment System, and Game Gear; Oracle Maze, a demo application at the Interop 92 conference to demonstrate Oracle's networking technology connecting many different companies' computers; MazeWars for NeXTSTEP by Mike Kienenberger in 1994, and MazeWars for Palm OS by IndiVideo in 1998.
