= Corrupted Blood incident =

Virtual epidemic in World of Warcraft

The Corrupted Blood debuff being spread among characters in Ironforge, one of World of Warcraft's in-game cities

The Corrupted Blood incident (also known as the World of Warcraft pandemic) took place between September 13 and October 8, 2005, in World of Warcraft, a massively multiplayer online role-playing game (MMORPG) developed by Blizzard Entertainment. When participating in a certain boss battle at the end of a raid, player characters would become infected with a debuff that was transmitted between characters in close proximity. While developers intended to keep the effects of the debuff within this boss's game region, a programming oversight soon led to the debuff becoming an in-game pandemic that spread throughout the fictional world of Azeroth.

World of Warcraft introduced the game region of Zul'Gurub on September 13. The boss of the region, Hakkar the Soulflayer, cast the debuff Corrupted Blood on raid participants, which expired when players defeated Hakkar. Corrupted Blood soon spread beyond Zul'Gurub through players deactivating their infected animal companions, who when reactivated in densely populated non-combat zones, still carried the debuff, becoming disease vectors, while non-player characters became asymptomatic carriers. Player reactions to the Corrupted Blood pandemic varied: some provided aid by healing players or warning them of outbreak zones, while griefers intentionally contracted the debuff to spread it across the game world. After several failed hotfixes, Blizzard ended the pandemic by performing a hard reset, and a later patch prevented companions from contracting Corrupted Blood entirely.

Although it was the result of a software bug, the Corrupted Blood incident gained longstanding notoriety among World of Warcraft players and interest among real-world disease researchers. Blizzard developed intentional in-game pandemics in two expansion sets: Wrath of the Lich King in 2008 and Shadowlands in 2020. Epidemiologists, meanwhile, took interest in how MMORPGs, unlike mathematical models, could capture individual human responses to disease outbreaks rather than generating assumptions about behavior.

== Background ==
Blizzard Entertainment released World of Warcraft, a massively multiplayer online role-playing game (MMORPG), on November 23, 2004, in North America and Australia, and a European release followed in February 2005. As a role-playing game, players create their player characters by choosing among various fantasy races, character classes, and allegiance to one of the game's in-universe factions. After creating their character, the player begins a quest in the fantasy world of Azeroth, where they may fight monsters either alone or together with other players in parties. For larger dungeon crawls, players may create a raid group of up to 40 characters. Player characters gain experience levels through the completion of quests and the defeat of non-player characters (NPCs) such as monsters or dragons. Gaining experience levels, higher-level armor, and improved weaponry then allows player characters to participate in more difficult dungeon crawls.

World of Warcraft was immediately popular upon its release, with over 240,000 subscribers within 24 hours of its North American launch. By March 2005, its subscriber base had reached 1.5 million individuals. By the time of the Corrupted Blood incident, World of Warcraft had over four million subscribers, corresponding to a $700 million annual revenue stream. It was significantly more popular than other MMORPGs of the time: EverQuest II had approximately 500,000 subscribers in September 2005, while The Matrix Online struggled to acquire 50,000 subscribers within three months of its release. To retain their subscribers after players finished all the content that was available upon World of Warcraft's release, Blizzard maintained a team of developers to regularly add new content such as raids.

== Incident ==
=== Zul'Gurub raid and pandemic origins ===
Zul'Gurub was added to the game's open world on September 13, 2005. It was the game's fourth major raid and the first intended for 20 players. The boss of this region was Hakkar the Soulflayer, who would cast a debuff on players called "Corrupted Blood". After Hakkar cast Corrupted Blood on one player in a raid group, the debuff would be transmitted to other player characters in close proximity. The effects of Corrupted Blood were intended to last for 10 seconds, or until the players defeated Hakkar, whichever came first. One of Hakkar's healing mechanisms was to temporarily stun a raid party and drain their blood. Blizzard developers intended for players to defeat Hakkar by first weakening him with attacks and then exposing themselves to Corrupted Blood - which would cause Hakkar to take damage when he tried to heal himself using the players' blood.

Developers had intended to limit the effects of the debuff to the Zul'Gurub region, but a programming oversight led to its spread throughout the in-game universe. Players with animal companions during boss battles could protect pets infected with Corrupted Blood by placing them into a type of suspended animation mid-fight. These pets were subsequently re-activated after the completion of the boss battle, but developers had forgotten to include an "off-switch" that would recognize the conclusion of the raid and remove the debuff from companions. Players who defeated Hakkar would subsequently fast travel to markets in urban centers in order to repair their damaged armor and weaponry. They then re-activated their infected pets, who became disease vectors, allowing Corrupted Blood to spread beyond players involved in the raid. Other NPCs could become infected with the disease, but they were incapable of dying, and instead became asymptomatic carriers for player characters.

Once it spread beyond the Zul'Gurub region, Corrupted Blood quickly became pandemic in Azeroth. No index case was ever identified. Outbreaks soon occurred in Orgrimmar, the capital city of the Orcs, and in the dwarf city of Ironforge. There was no in-game cure for Corrupted Blood, which inflicted between 263 and 337 hit points of damage every two seconds. This level of damage would be enough to kill a character of the then-highest experience level in 30 seconds or less. While World of Warcraft player characters are resurrected after death, protective wearables (such as armor) that a character had acquired would become damaged by 10% upon each death, becoming unusable at 0% "durability" until the player pays to have the affected item(s) repaired by a blacksmith NPC.

=== Player reactions and responses ===
The sudden arrival and spread of the Corrupted Blood pandemic created widespread panic among World of Warcraft's user base. One player told The Washington Post that the "world chat would explode any time a city fell. We kept a close eye not only on our guild chat but on world chat as well to see where not to go. We didn't want to catch it." Casual World of Warcraft players who had read about the incident on the news would log into their accounts to better understand the pandemic, promptly infecting their characters. The in-game environment soon filled with the skeletons and corpses of player characters who had succumbed to the infection, and internet forums described seeing "hundreds" of these bodies throughout Azeroth's population centers. One player described Azeroth as "filled to the brim with corpses", the "streets literally white with the bones of the dead". Another posted that "[s]ome servers have gotten so bad that you can't go into the major cities without getting the plague. And anyone less than like Level 50 nearly immediately dies." Some players incorrectly speculated that the Corrupted Blood incident had been intentional, with developers intending for the Hakkar boss battle to lead directly into a pandemic-based game event.

Once players realized the scope of the pandemic, individual reactions to the infection varied. Some players whose characters possessed healing abilities headed to major cities as impromptu first responders, but these characters often contracted and died from the disease as well. Healing measures were largely ineffective, as only one character class, Paladins, were capable of removing debuffs of Corrupted Blood's nature, and players risked reinfection almost immediately upon healing. More often, rather than removing the Corrupted Blood infection, healing characters merely kept characters alive and contagious, thereby prolonging the spread of the infection. Less powerful player characters, meanwhile, would stand at the edges of infected towns, warning other player characters not to enter. Players transmitted information from afar by using the game's farthest-reaching chat function, "yell". At least one player became an unofficial town crier, making announcements about new pandemic developments in the open world's public spaces. Other players enacted self-quarantine methods, remaining in less-populated wilderness areas of Azeroth rather than entering towns or cities where they risked infection. Although the pandemic did not extend to the real world, epidemiologist Nina Fefferman noted that "players seemed to really feel they were at risk and took the threat of infection seriously, even though it was only a game."

Griefers, players who engage in bad faith multiplayer game tactics, took advantage of the Corrupted Blood incident to target and inconvenience other players. These players would purposely contract Corrupted Blood and travel to densely populated areas to further its spread. One griefer whose guild engaged in this practice told Wired that he did so because he was amused by the reactions of other players, saying, "It's just funny to watch people run away screaming". Fefferman compared these players to Typhoid Mary, an asymptomatic carrier of typhoid fever who resisted warnings and quarantines to infect others with the disease. Discussion on internet chat forums about Corrupted Blood often included misinformation among general confusion.

=== Developer response and end of incident ===
At approximately 1:15 p.m. (EDT) on the afternoon of September 16, three days after the start of the incident, a Blizzard staff member reported that the team was "aware of the issue and working on it". While the company quickly became aware that Corrupted Blood had spread beyond its intended reach, identifying and fixing the issue that led to the pandemic proved difficult. One of the first steps that Blizzard took to attempt containment of the virus was to institute quarantine zones, placing barriers around heavily infected areas. The effect that this quarantine had was limited, as some players managed to bypass Blizzard's containment measures. Developers, meanwhile, faced difficulties in isolating and removing the virus from the pet companions that were driving its spread. Their two options for healing pet companions were to manually check every animal in the game universe for Corrupted Blood infection or developing "really hacky code" that would automatically check for infection every time a companion was summoned.

Blizzard attempted to put a stop to the pandemic with hotfixes, including restarting each game server on a rolling basis, but Corrupted Blood outbreaks soon re-emerged in restarted areas. These outbreaks also came on a rolling basis: the plague would dissipate after running through a particular game region, only to re-emerge once players, believing that the danger had passed, repopulated the area. After one week without finding a suitable remedy, Blizzard performed hard resets on the World of Warcraft servers, resetting Azeroth to its state from just before the introduction of Corrupted Blood. On October 8, Blizzard released a patch for World of Warcraft that made pet companions immune to contracting Corrupted Blood.

== Impact ==
=== On World of Warcraft and other games ===
While Blizzard had not intended to create a pandemic event with the Corrupted Blood incident, the company noted the popularity that the pandemic had received. In 2008, Blizzard released an intentional plague in World of Warcraft to echo the success of the Corrupted Blood pandemic. On October 22, shortly before the release of a World of Warcraft expansion set titled Wrath of the Lich King, several mysterious crates appeared in one Azeroth town. Player characters who inspected these crates became infected with an unknown disease, and if they did not find a cure within 10 minutes, they would be transformed into zombies. Unlike Corrupted Blood, it was possible to cure the zombie infection through healing spells or NPC aid. As the number of infected characters grew, however, the time frame for healing became shorter and the virus became resistant to cleansing. Blizzard put a stop to the Lich King plague on October 28 after receiving complaints from players that the zombie infection was detracting from other parts of the game.

Another zombie pandemic known as the Scourge invasion was featured in 2020's World of Warcraft: Shadowlands expansion. To limit griefing attacks, the 2020 Scourge invasion was designed to make opting into the event more of a conscious choice by players who wanted to fight against the zombie hordes. The Scourge invasion received criticism, however, for its handling of new players. Shadowlands created a new starting area for players, Exile's Reach, in which new characters were separated from the rest of the game until they reached level 10. While this alternative starting area was isolated from the zombie pandemic, players whose characters began in other starting areas remained susceptible to infection and death.

In 2012, Star Wars: The Old Republic, a MMORPG by BioWare, released an online disease resembling the Corrupted Blood plague. Characters infected with the Rakghoul Plague would develop a signature cough that became progressively louder before they transformed into a zombie-like creature. Because the plague was transmitted more easily in heavily populated centers, player characters conducted business in more remote trading areas to avoid infection. Unlike the Corrupted Blood incident, BioWare intentionally released the Rakghoul Plague, and player characters who succumbed to the disease received special items. Lead designer Daniel Erickson told reporters that the Rakghoul Plague was inspired by the Corrupted Blood incident, but that developers wanted to steer players away from griefing and towards positive interactions with the pandemic.

Blizzard closed the Zul'Gurub raid in 2010 as part of a larger update which transformed the region into a five-person dungeon with new bosses. The region was added to World of Warcraft Classic in 2020, but because Classic was derived from code created after the Corrupted Blood patch, pets were immune to Corrupted Blood, preventing another pandemic.

=== As a research model ===
The impact that the Corrupted Blood pandemic had on World of Warcraft players gained the attention of epidemiologists. The Centers for Disease Control and Prevention (CDC) contacted Blizzard after the incident, asking if they could use data from what they perceived as a planned disease simulation to inform their disease modeling research. Blizzard informed the facility that the Corrupted Blood outbreak was the unintentional result of a software bug and they thus had no usable data. Despite its accidental nature, the Corrupted Blood incident bore several resemblances to real-world pandemics, leading researchers to explore the event as a disease model. In an article for the journal Epidemiology, Ran Balicer of the Ben-Gurion University of the Negev compared the role that pet companions played in the spread of Corrupted Blood to avian influenza, which spread through asymptomatic ducks. The use of fast travel to quickly spread the disease between distant locations was also compared to the role that air travel played in the 2002–2004 SARS outbreak.

Of particular interest to researchers in the use of MMORPGs for epidemiology is that character responses to a virtual pandemic are the result of individual player reactions, adding "a level of authenticity that doesn't exist in other simulations". Disease researchers typically study disease spread and control through the use of three general models, all of which make significant assumptions about human behavior. As behavior is difficult to predict, the effectiveness of these models is limited. The use of MMORPG environments like World of Warcraft introduces human behavior into disease models: while player characters are virtual, players are attached to the health and success of their characters and others, creating an immersive social environment. Video game models necessarily include player behaviors that would not be included in a general model. For instance, characters may deliberately enter infected areas in the hope that a healing character would protect them, just as individuals may expose themselves to infection under the belief that a vaccine may be in the region.

Some researchers have responded skeptically to the notion that games like World of Warcraft may accurately model real-world infectious disease patterns. Although Gary Smith, a professor at the University of Pennsylvania, admitted that mathematical disease models fail to take into account the spectrum of human behavior, he questioned the ability of a video game to remedy this error, saying that "the study is just as 'observational' as disease outbreak studies in the real world". Dmitri Williams, an associate professor at the University of Southern California and a World of Warcraft player, questioned whether a player's behavior in a game "where you are encouraged to behave in a way that you would never behave offline" would be applicable to the real world. Neil Ferguson, director of the MRC Centre for Global Infectious Disease Analysis, noted that because characters could regenerate, there was not as much risk in becoming infected with a virtual disease, limiting the applicability of player behavior to the real world.

While the Corrupted Blood incident created a focus on video games as tools of disease research, there were some specific aspects of the debuff that limited its applicability to other pandemics. For instance, the basic reproduction number of Corrupted Blood was significantly higher than any observed real-world pathogen, which in turn affected the rate of spread and player reactions. Additionally, players who had been infected with Corrupted Blood did not gain immunity to the debuff, which kept the infection circulating in perpetuity.

Outside of disease research, some have speculated that the griefing attacks that took place during the Corrupted Blood pandemic may provide a model for bioterrorism research. Charles Blair of the Center for Terrorism and Intelligence Studies told Wired that, just as the human behavior in World of Warcraft supplemented general disease models, the behavior of griefers could augment the computer-modeled tactical decision-making enacted by terrorist researchers.

=== Comparisons to the COVID-19 pandemic ===
The sudden impact of the COVID-19 pandemic in 2020 led several researchers to turn to the Corrupted Blood incident as a potential model for understanding the virus's sociological impact. The Elysium Project, an independent fan-led organization maintaining early versions of World of Warcraft, ran an experiment titled "Pandemic In Azeroth" which mimicked both the Corrupted Blood incident and the COVID-19 pandemic. The pandemic infected 88 percent of active players, but by implementing sanitation and isolation measures, this number soon dropped to 42.2 percent.

Other researchers noted the similarities between the game and the real-world pandemics. Both had an immediate impact on dense urban areas, which limited the effectiveness of containment procedures in stopping the spread of disease, while air travel, like fast travel, allowed infections to spread across large parts of the world with ease. Lofgren compared the in-game "first responders", many of whom contracted Corrupted Blood when they attempted to heal others, to healthcare workers that were overrun with COVID-19 patients and became infected themselves. While a direct analogy was not made to griefers, Lofgren also acknowledged individuals who contracted the COVID-19 virus but chose not to quarantine, thus infecting others through negligence.

== See also ==
- Falador Massacre – A historic bug that occurred in RuneScape
- Battle of B-R5RB – Massive virtual battle in the Eve Online game
