= Permadeath =

Video game mechanic

Permadeath (a portmanteau of permanent death) is a game mechanic in both tabletop games and video games in which player characters who lose all of their health are considered dead and cannot be used anymore; it is one form of death in video games. Depending on the situation, this could require the player to create a new character to continue, or completely restart the game potentially losing nearly all progress made. Other terms include persona death and player death. Some video games offer a hardcore mode that features this mechanic, rather than making it part of the core game.

Permadeath contrasts with games that allow the player to continue in some manner, such as their character respawning at a checkpoint on "death", resurrection of their character by a magic item or spell, or being able to load and restore a saved game state to avoid the death situation. The mechanic is frequently associated with both tabletop and computer-based role-playing games, and is considered an essential element of the roguelike genre of video games. The implementation of permadeath can vary depending on the type of game.

== In single-player video games ==
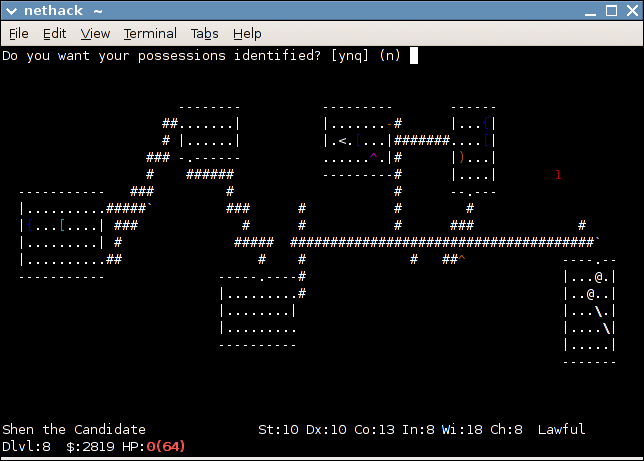
A player, having died in NetHack, is asked if they would like to know more about the unidentified possessions they had been carrying.

Permadeath was common in the golden age of arcade video games. Most arcade games (such as Space Invaders and Pac-Man) feature permanent death as a mechanic by default because they lack the technical ability to save the game state. Early home gaming mimicked this gameplay, including a simulation of entering coins to continue playing. As home computers and game consoles became more popular, games evolved to have less abstract protagonists, giving the death of a character more impact. When developers added the ability to replay a failed level, games become more complex to compensate, and stronger narratives were added, which focused on progressing characters through a linear story without repeated restarts. Inspired by the dungeon crawls in the first wave of Dungeons & Dragons adventures, early role-playing video games on home computers often lacked much narrative content and had a cavalier attitude toward killing off characters; players were expected to have little emotional connection to their characters, though many allowed players to save their characters' progress.

Few single-player RPGs exhibit death that is truly permanent, as most allow the player to load a previously saved game and continue from the stored position. The subgenre of roguelike games is an exception, where permadeath is a high-value factor. While players can suspend game and resume it from the same point linearly, they are typically unable to "rewind" the game to an earlier state to act differently and "branch the history". To achieve this, the game at all times keeps at most one, most recent savefile. Yet players may deliberately work around this by backing up and restoring savefiles using system tools, this tactic, called "save scumming", is considered cheating. The use of the permadeath mechanic in roguelikes arose from the namesake of the genre, Rogue. The developers initially did not implement save capabilities, requiring players to finish the game in one session. When they added a save feature, they found that players would repeatedly reload a save file to obtain the best results, which was contrary to the game design—they "wanted [realism]"—so they implemented code to delete the save file on reloading. This feature is retained in nearly all derivatives of Rogue and other games more loosely inspired by its gameplay.

Implementations of permadeath may vary widely. Casual forms of permanent death may allow players to retain money or items while introducing repercussions for failure, reducing the frustration associated with permanent death. More hardcore implementations delete all progress made. In some games, permadeath is an optional mode or feature of higher difficulty levels. Extreme forms may further punish players, such as The Castle Doctrine, which has the option of permanently banning users from servers upon death. Players may prefer to play games with permadeath for the excitement, the desire to test their skill or understanding of the game's mechanics, or out of boredom with standard game design. When their actions have repercussions, they must make more strategic and tactical decisions. At the same time, games using permadeath may encourage players to rely on emotional, intuitive or other non-deductive decision-making as they attempt, with less information, to minimize the risk to characters which they have bonded with. Games using permadeath more closely simulate real life, though games with a strong narrative element frequently avoid permadeath.

Permadeath of individual characters can be a factor in party-based tactical role-playing games like the games from the Fire Emblem series. In these games, the player generally manages a roster of characters and controls their actions in turn-based battles while building their attributes, skills, and specializations over time. If these characters fall in combat, the character is considered dead for the remainder of the game. It is possible to return to a previous save game state in these games before the death of the character, but this requires the player to invest more time in order to repeat the battle and continue, risking the loss of the same or other characters. Square's 1986 fantasy shoot 'em up game King's Knight featured four characters, each of which had to clear their own level before rejoining the others. If one of them died, they were lost permanently.

== In multiplayer video games ==
=== In massively multiplayer online role-playing games ===
Permadeath in multiplayer video games is controversial. Due to player desires and the resulting market forces involved, massively multiplayer online role-playing games (such as World of Warcraft) and other multiplayer-focused RPGs rarely implement it nowadays, despite permadeath being a key component of early virtual worlds such as MUD1. Generally speaking, there is little support in multiplayer culture for permadeath. Summarizing academic Richard Bartle's comments on player distaste for permadeath, Engadget characterized fans of MMORPGs as horrified by the concept. For games that charge an ongoing fee to play, permadeath may drive players away, creating a financial disincentive to permadeath.

Diablo II, Diablo III, Diablo IV, Minecraft, Terraria, and Torchlight II are mainstream exceptions that include support for an optional "hardcore" mode that subjects characters to permadeath. Star Wars Galaxies had permadeath for Jedi characters for a short period but later eliminated that functionality after other players targeted them. Even World of Warcraft has a following of players who call it the "Hardcore Challenge". Players who join this challenge use an addon in their game to track their combat. If their character ever dies, the rule is they must delete their character.

Proponents attribute a number of reasons why others oppose permadeath. Some attribute tainted perceptions to poor early implementations. They also believe that confusion exists between "player killing" and permadeath, when the two do not need to be used together. Proponents also believe that players initially exposed to games without permadeath consider new games from that point of view. Those players are attributed as eventually "maturing", to a level of accepting permadeath, but only for other players' characters.

The majority of MMORPG players are unwilling to accept the penalty of losing their characters. MMORPGs have experimented with permadeath in an attempt to simulate a more realistic world, but a majority of players preferred not to risk permadeath for their characters. As a result, while they occasionally announce games that feature permadeath, most either remove or never ship with it so as to increase the game's mass appeal.

Proponents of permadeath claim the risk gives additional significance to their in-game actions. While games without it often impose an in-game penalty for restoring a dead character, the penalty is relatively minor compared to being forced to create a new character. Therefore, the primary change permadeath creates is to make a player's decisions more significant; without it there is less incentive for the player to consider in-game actions seriously. Those seeking to risk permanent death feel that the more severe consequences heighten the sense of involvement and achievement derived from their characters. The increased risk renders acts of heroism and bravery within the gameworld significant; the player has risked a much larger investment of time. Without permadeath, such actions are "small actions". However, in an online game, permadeath generally means starting over from the beginning, isolating the player of the now-dead character from former comrades.

Richard Bartle described advantages of permanent death: restriction of early adopters from permanently held positions of power, content reuse as players repeat early sections, its embodiment of the "default fiction of real life", improved player immersion from more frequent character changes, and reinforcement of high level achievement. Bartle also believes that in the absence of permanent death, game creators must continually create new content for top players, which discourages those not at the top from even bothering to advance.

Those players who prefer not to play with permadeath are unwilling to accept the risk of the large penalties associated with it. The penalty often means a great deal of time spent to regain lost levels, power, influence, or emotional investment that the previous character possessed. This increased investment of time can dissuade non-hardcore players. Depending on the design of the game, this may involve playing through content that the player has already experienced. Players no longer interested in those aspects of the game will not want to spend time playing through them again in the hope of reaching others to which they previously had access. Players may dislike the way that permadeath causes others to be more wary than they would in regular games, reducing the heroic atmosphere that games seek to provide. Ultimately this can reduce play to slow, repetitive, low-risk play, commonly called "grinding". Most MMORPGs do not allow character creation at an arbitrary experience level, even if the player has already achieved that level with a now-dead character, providing a powerful disincentive for permadeath.

Permadeath guilds may exist in multiplayer games without this feature. Players voluntarily delete their characters based on the honor system.

== In tabletop games ==
Permadeath can be used as a mechanic in tabletop role-playing games like Dungeons & Dragons. In these games, players create their own characters and level through campaigns, but these characters can be permanently killed in more difficult encounters, which would force players to recreate a new character. These games typically have rules to stave off this permadeath, such as through resurrection spells, since this would allow players to remain committed to their character.

== In other games ==
Although permadeath mechanic is primarily used for role-playing and rogue-like video games, both platform games made in Flash, You Only Live Once (2009) and One Chance (2010), has together been frequently cited in video game literature as an example of the permanent death mechanic that they used. Survival horror video games such as Sweet Home (1989) and Resident Evil (1996); and interactive drama games such as Heavy Rain (2010), Until Dawn (2015), and Detroit: Become Human (2018) also use permadeath mechanic as the game will adapt to these changes and story continues forward to approach multiple endings whether any characters survive or not.

== See also ==
- Game over

== Bibliography ==
- Bartle, Richard (2003). Designing Virtual Worlds. New Riders. ISBN 978-0-13-101816-7.
- Bartle, Richard. "Column 2".
- Glater, Jonathan D. (4 March 2004). "50 First Deaths: A Chance to Play (and Pay) Again". New York Times.
- Schubert, Damion (12 April 2005). "Please, Not the Permadeath Debate Again". Archived from the original on 1 October 2011. Schubert is game designer whose massive multi-player game credits include Lead Designer on Meridian 59, work on Ultima Online, Lead Designer for the sequel to Ultima Online.
- "Damion Schubert". MobyGames.
