= DVW =

DVW may refer to:

- Deutscher Verlag der Wissenschaften, a former East-German publishing house for scientific literature
- Dee Valley Water, a British water company
- Designing Virtual Worlds, a 2003 book about video games
