= One Chance =

One Chance may refer to:

== Music ==
- One Chance (group), an American band
- One Chance (album), a 2007 Paul Potts album
- "One Chance", a 2009 Meghan Trainor song from the album Meghan Trainor

== Other uses ==
- One Chance (film), a 2013 film
- One Chance (video game), a 2010 video game
