= Hakkar =

Hakkar may refer to:

- Hakkar the Soulflayer, the boss that set off the Corrupted Blood incident in World of Warcraft
- Amor Hakkar, Algerian filmmaker
- Morrade Hakkar, French boxer
