= Dragon kill points =

Semi-formal score-keeping system for massively multiplayer online games

Dragon kill points (DKP) are a semi-formal score-keeping system (loot system) used by guilds in massively multiplayer online games. Players in these games are faced with large scale challenges, or raids, which may only be surmounted through the concerted effort of dozens of players at a time. While many players may be involved in defeating a boss, the boss will reward the group with only a small number of items desired by the players. Faced with this scarcity, some system of fairly distributing the items must be established. Used originally in the massively multiplayer online role-playing game EverQuest, dragon kill points are points that are awarded to players for defeating bosses and redeemed for items that those bosses would "drop". At the time, most of the bosses faced by the players were dragons, hence the name.

While not transferable outside of a particular guild, DKP are often treated in a manner similar to currency by guilds. They are paid out at a specified rate and redeemed in modified first or second price auctions, although these are not the only methods by which DKP may be redeemed or awarded. However, Dragon kill points are distinct from the virtual currencies in each game world which are designed by the game developers; DKP systems vary from guild to guild and the points themselves only have value in regard to the dispersal of boss "loot".

== Origin and motivation ==
DKP systems were first designed for Everquest in 1999 by Thott as part of the creation of a guild called "Afterlife" and named for two dragons, Lady Vox and Lord Nagafen. Since then, it has been adapted for use in other similar online games. In World of Warcraft, for example, an Avatar named Dragonkiller started its popular use and other programmers designed applications so that the system could work in game as an application to track data for achievements made. Unlike pen and paper or more traditional role-playing video games, massively multiplayer online games could present challenges so significant that the number of players required to defeat them would greatly exceed the number of items awarded to the raid following the boss kill—a raid of 25 individuals may only see two or three items "drop". The actual number of players required to defeat a specific boss varies from game to game, but the person-hours invested are non-trivial. Raid encounters may involve "10-200 players organized to achieve a common goal over a period of typically around 3-6 continuous hours" and demand teamwork and competence from all raid members.

As the number of players required to defeat a boss grows, so does the problem of distributing the rewards from such efforts. Since these items appear, or "drop", in quantities much smaller than the total number of players in the group required to defeat them, a means of deciding which of the players should receive the items is necessary. At the "endgame", new items rewarded from boss kills represent one of the only means to continue to enhance the combat effectiveness of the character or the social standing of the player. As such, individual players care about receiving a fair shot at dropped items. Guilds facing smaller challenges with fewer players typically begin by allotting items through a simulated roll of the dice (provided by the software serving the game itself), similar to dice rolls used to dictate the outcome of contingent events in pen and paper role-playing games. As the number of players expands, rolls may be weighted by seniority within the guild or adjusted by some other measure so as to ensure that veterans of the guild do not lose out on an item to a new member. Games and dungeons which require larger groups of players may create the incentive for more formal DKP systems. Methods to reward items according to seniority or performance developed out of these modifications, including systems relying on a formal allotment of points per kill.

== Mechanics of a DKP system ==
The basic concepts of most DKP systems are simple. Players are given points for participating in raids or other guild events and spend those points on the item of their choice when the boss 'drops' the item. A player who does not get a chance to spend their DKP accumulates it between raids and is able to spend it in the future. These points, while earned and spent like currency, are not the same thing as the virtual currency provided by the game company for the virtual world. The points themselves represent only the social contract that guilds extend to players. Should that player leave the guild or the guild disband, those points become valueless. These measures vary considerably in usage. Some guilds eschew formalized 'loot' systems completely, allowing guild leaders to direct which players receive items from bosses. Some use complex measures to determine item price while others use an auction system to allocate goods via bidding. A few common variations are described below.

=== Zero-sum DKP ===
Zero-sum DKP systems are designed to ensure the net change in points among the raid is zero for each item dropped, as the name might suggest. When the item drops, each player who is interested in it indicates as much to a guild leader. The player who has the highest DKP total receives the item for its specified price and the same number of points are divided evenly among the rest of the raid and given out, resulting in no net change to the raid total. As a result, the raid would only be rewarded DKP if at least one player desired the item dropped by the boss. Since over time guilds will revisit the same boss multiple times, some zero-sum DKP systems are modified to introduce a "dummy" character which may be awarded DKP for the boss "kill" even though no player in the guild received an item. This is purely an accounting measure and allows the guild to reward players for defeating a boss if they are using an automated point tracking system.

=== Simple DKP ===
The simplest DKP variation is one where every item has a set price list and each player earns some specified number of DKP each time they participate in a guild raid. Like zero-sum systems, the player with the most points recorded actually received the item, paying the specified price. Unlike zero-sum, a simple DKP system does not compensate the rest of the raid based in the value of the items received.

=== Auction systems ===
Setting "prices" in DKP for specific items can be difficult, as analysis of a particular item can be subjective and laborious. In order to avoid this quandary, guilds may establish an auction system for items. Points are awarded to the player at some specified rate and when the items are awarded to the raid group, players bid DKP for the item of their choice. Auctions may be conducted in an open ascending fashion or through sealed bids over private messages to guild leaders. While this process results in relatively efficient allocation of items to players willing to part with DKP, it presents the social consequence that perceived selfish bidding could result in an item being awarded to a character who would not make the best use of it.

== DKP as virtual capital ==
Since the intention of DKP is to allocate scarce resources amongst guild members, they can be understood in the context of virtual capital. Players "earn" and "spend" DKP, bidding in a system of auctions for an item which holds some value for them. DKP are referred to as "currency" a guild leader pays his "employees". Despite these analogies, DKP remain a kind of "private money system", allowing guilds to mete out these otherwise unachievable items in return for participation and discipline. The points cannot be traded or redeemed outside the guild and are not actually part of the game itself; they are tracked on external websites. In contrast, the virtual currencies created by game developers are part of the game software and may be traded between players without respect to any social affiliation. Just as DKP is valueless outside the guild, parlaying of economic capital for DKP (paying real world currency in exchange for DKP) is almost unheard of. Because guilds mete out DKP in return for participation in events, the functional result is that DKP serve less as currency or material capital and more as what Torill Mortensen refers to as a "social stabilizer"; players who attend raids more frequently or play by the rules reap the rewards while more "casual" gamers do not. This provides an incentive for players to remain in the social system (the guild) longer than they might otherwise.

Within the guild, DKP may stand in for competence—high level items (Krista-Lee Malone mentions a specific item from World of Warcraft, the "Cold Snap" wand) are forms of cultural capital themselves. Since the items are "bound" to the player who first receives them, the only way to wield a desired item is to be involved in the raid that defeated the boss which rewards it. As such, a "Cold Snap" represents a signal to other players that the bearer has defeated a particular high-level monster and therefore mastered the skills needed to do so. The points themselves represent a mélange of cultural and material capital. The language of material capital is used: "price", "bid", and "currency", but these terms belie a unit of account that "crosses the line between material and symbolic".
