= Claws of Furry =

- Xbox One cover art
- Developer: Terahard Studios
- Publisher: Terahard Studios
- Producer: Aris Tsevrenis
- Designer: Nicola Zamboni
- Programmer: Harry Evans
- Artist: Christopher Stratos
- Engine: Unity
- Platforms: Windows; OS X; Xbox One; PlayStation 4; Switch
- Release: September 3, 2018: Windows, OS X, Switch; September 3, 2018; Xbox One; September 4, 2018; PS4; September 11, 2018
- Genre: Beat 'em up
- Modes: Single-player, multiplayer

Claws of Furry is a side-scrolling beat 'em up video game developed and published by Terahard Studios. Four anthropomorphic ninja cat warriors are on a quest to rescue their sensei from their archnemesis. The game released on Steam and the Nintendo Switch on September 3, 2018, with the PlayStation 4 and Xbox One following several days later.

== Gameplay ==
Claws of Furry is a side-scrolling beat-em-up fused with traditional action platforming elements. The game features a 90s-inspired comic book art style. There are two main game modes. "Im-paw-ssible" mode borrows elements from roguelike video games, in that it makes use of the permadeath mechanic, e.g. if the player's character dies, the player must start at the beginning of Level 1. "Pussycat" mode allows players to save their progress after finishing each level, thus playing as a classic linear adventure. There is also an "Arena"-style Mode ("Catrmageddon"), in which players fight off waves of different enemies in various different stages, trying to kill as many enemies as they can within the specified time limit.

Claws of Furry gameplay involves short levels featuring waves of enemies that the player needs to defeat to eventually progress to a boss fight. After a level is completed, the game awards players a score and a grade. Claws of Furry controls feature both light and heavy attacks, as well as the ability to jump, dodge and use a special ability that players can use whenever their power metre is filled by defeating enemies.

The game features several unlockable costumes, ranging from ninja suits to ones based on popular superheroes, such as Batman and Deadpool, each with unique features or powers, such as being able to freeze enemies or allow the character to regenerate health. Players unlock new outfits by completing a set of requirements during regular play.

Claws of Furry supports cooperative gameplay for up to four players, either locally or online. In multiplayer, enemies are harder to defeat than in single-player mode, and have more health. Further, downed player characters can be revived by the other players.

== Development ==
Development on Claws of Furry started in January 2017. Initially, five people from Terahard were working on the project as an experiment in productivity, one which was meant to last three months in total. By the end of Summer 2017, the group had produced a convincing design document and a prototype, so the decision was made to bring in the entire team on board. The eventual development effort lasted nine months in total.

== Reception ==
According to the review aggregation website Metacritic, the Switch version of Claws of Furry received "mixed or average reviews" from critics, with an overall rating of 52% based on 4 critic reviews. The majority of critics praised the game's art style and graphics, but criticized the gameplay, and especially the game's take on difficulty.

Dom Reseigh-Lincoln of NintendoLife gave the game a 7 out of 10 rating, finding that "it's not a perfect arcade brawler by any means, but whether played solo or with up to three other players locally, there's a great deal to master and enjoy once you've borne the brunt of its demanding mechanics". Nintendo World Report on the other hand, gave the game a 5 out of 10, calling the game "disappointing".

The Xbox One version of the game received similar criticism. Simply Xbox gave the game a 6.7 score, acknowledging Claws of Furry "offers a certain level of fun", but is ultimately "let down by its lack of originality, frustrating difficulty spike and generic gameplay". Jamie Collyer of the Xbox Tavern criticized the game as "a poor attempt at following a trend in gaming", giving Claws of Furry a "Lousy" score of 3.6. Nick Burton of The Xbox Hub gave the game one star, concluding that "with slow dialogue, repetitive and stressful combat encounters in which enemies glitch out of the map and push you into lava far more than you deserve, and a game length which is rather insulting for the price, I can only be honest and tell you to stay away from Claws of Furry".
