= MUD2 =

- Developers: Multi-User Entertainment: Roy Trubshaw; Richard Bartle; Simon Dally
- Engine: MUDDLE
- Platform: Platform independent
- Release: 1985
- Genre: Fantasy MUD
- Mode: Multiplayer

MUD2 is the successor of MUD1, Richard Bartle's pioneering Multi-User Dungeon. MUD2 is not a sequel to MUD1, instead being a heavily updated version of MUD1 (MUD1 is officially version 3 of the codebase, MUD2 is version 4) - with the engine being implemented in C, featuring significantly more content than MUD1, and uses a flexible object-oriented scripting language (MUDDLE) to define content as opposed to MUD1's 'glorified table lookup system' (MUDDL).

The game is nominally a roleplaying game, with a strict set of rules, character classes and levels. Characters progress up a ladder of 11 levels until they reach the traditional MUD goal of wiz (wizard or witch).

Characters move between locations, or game rooms, using compass directions, and basic commands such as GET LONGSWORD, GET DIAMOND, KILL DWARF WITH LONGSWORD. Points are scored by dropping treasure in the room known as the swamp, performing certain actions, killing an NPC, or killing another player. The game also includes magical powers, which are gained through a mystical artifact known as The Touchstone. The small side effect of this is that touching the Touchstone may kill the player, with the likelihood of death decreasing as players get higher in level, but death is always possible. In order to make Wiz, one must also complete seven of eight tasks (in addition to reaching the point threshold and surviving the touchstone). Wizzes are effectively granted limitless power over the world itself, with powers including the ability to add more content to the world (areas, mobiles, items, etc), freely manipulate objects in the world (including the personae of logged-in players), and can freely destroy anything (or anyone) if they so desire - of course, this does come with the responsibility to use one's acquired Wizdom to assist with managing the game.

Just like its predecessor, MUD2 features permadeath, with one's persona being deleted if killed in combat (whether by a mobile or another player), but most environmental deaths (besides some such as the aforementioned Touchstone) merely cause one's persona to lose points and return the player to the title screen. If one wishes to play without being killed by other players, it is possible for one to make their persona a 'Protected Persona' (PP) by using the VOW command in the tearoom (the starting room), but Protected Personae cannot obtain Wizdom, can still be killed by anything besides a player, and un-protecting a PP (willingly via UNVOW in the tearoom, or automatically upon reaching 102,400 points) costs 2/3 of one's points.

The game's levels are laid out as follows:

Level	Magical	Points
Novice	-	0
Protector	Seer	200
Yeoman	Soothsayer	400
Warrior	Cabalist	800
Swordsman	Magician	1,600
Hero	Enchanter	3,200
Superhero	Spellbinder	6,400
Champion	Sorcerer	12,800
Guardian	Necromancer	25,600
Legend	Warlock	51,200
Sir	Mage	102,400
-	Wizard	204,800

It is generally acknowledged that the biggest challenge in the game is other players, and highly skilled players that have made wiz will actively test "mortal" players to ensure they have the required level of skill to complete, and then manage the game.

Much of MUD2's long-running appeal comes from its much-celebrated depth, and its wide-ranging gameplay, as it contains large elements of puzzle-solving and exploration, as well as elements of skill, chance, and humour.
