= Saved game =

Digital information about player progress

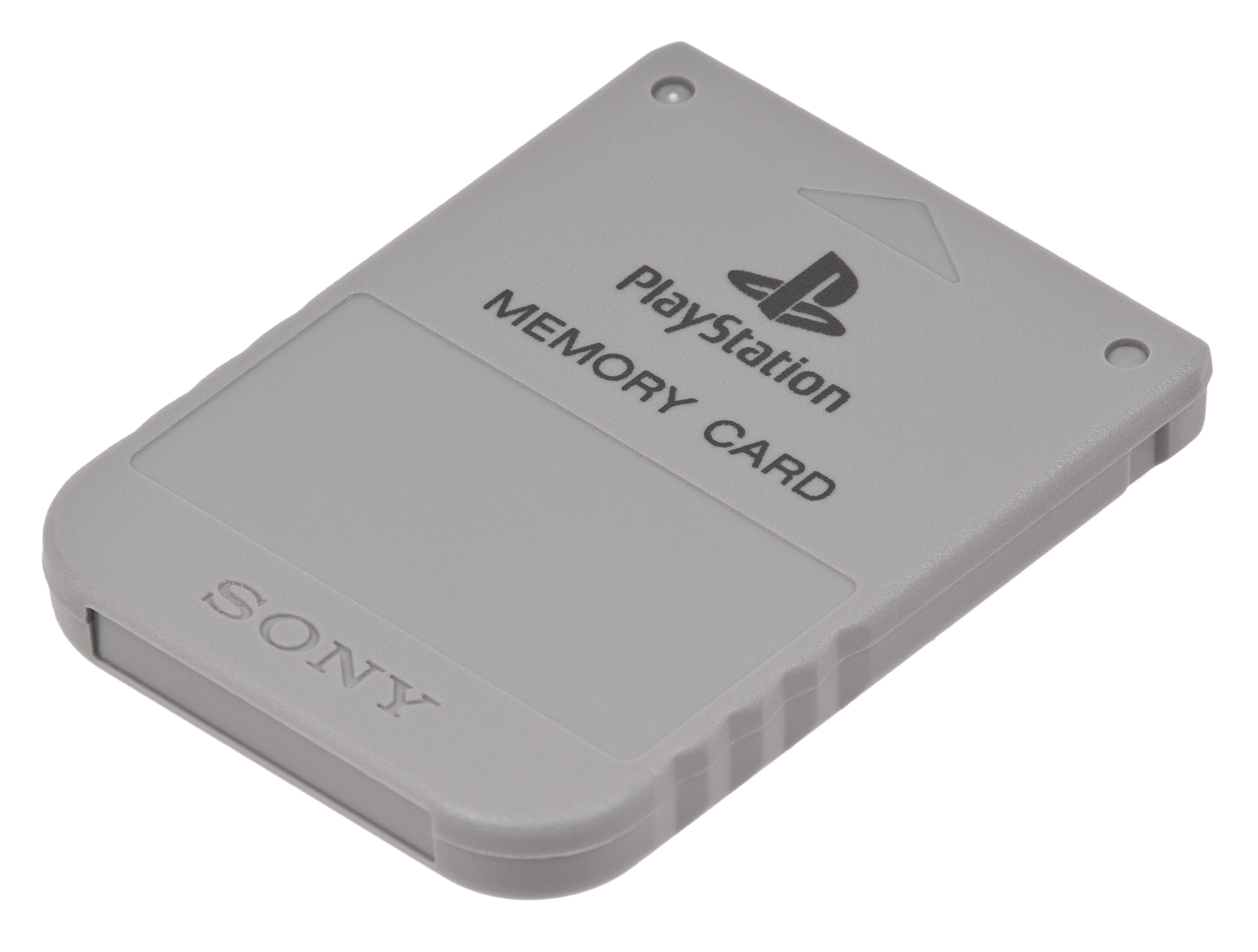
Electronic memory cards used explicitly for game saves, such as this one for the Sony PlayStation, were common during the 5th and 6th generation of consoles as read-only media became more popular. This method of storing game saves has been largely replaced in newer consoles by internal hard disk drives and solid-state drives.

A saved game (also called a game save, savegame, savefile, save point, or simply save) is a piece of digitally stored information about the progress of a player in a video game.

From the earliest games in the 1970s onward, game platform hardware and memory improved, which led to bigger and more complex computer games, which, in turn, tended to take more and more time to play them from start to finish. This naturally led to the need to store in some way the progress, and how to handle the case where the player received a "game over". More modern games with a heavier emphasis on storytelling are designed to allow the player many choices that impact the story in a profound way later on, and some game designers do not want to allow more than one save game so that the experience will always be "fresh".

Game designers allow players to prevent the loss of progress in the game (as might happen after a game over or character death). Games designed this way encourage players to 'try things out', and on regretting a choice, continue from an earlier point on.

Although the feature of save games often allows for gameplay to resume after a game over, a notable exception is in games where save games are deleted when it is game over. Several names are used to describe this feature, including "permadeath", "iron man", and "hardcore", and the feature has developed over the years from being the only kind of save system per game to the more modern 'suspend game' feature among regular save points. For online games, the game's progress is maintained on the remote server. In some games, upon resuming the game from a save game, the software locks or marks the save game. Early examples include Moria and Diablo II's "hardcore" mode where the character save game is managed by the server. The use of saved games is very common in modern video games, particularly in role-playing video games, which are usually much too long to finish in a single session.

== Overview and history ==
In early video games, there was no need for saving games, since these games usually had no actual plot to develop and were generally very short in length.

Classic arcade video games from the golden age of arcade video games did not save the player's progress towards completing the game, but rather high scores, custom settings, and other features. The first game to save the player's score was Taito's seminal 1978 shoot 'em up title Space Invaders.

The relative complexity and inconvenience of storing game state information on early home computers (and the fact that early video game consoles had no non-volatile data storage) meant that initially game saves were represented as "passwords" (often strings of characters that encoded the game state) that players could write down and later input into the game when resuming.

BYTE magazine stated in 1981, regarding the computer text adventure Zork I's save-game feature, that "while some cowards use it to retain their hard-earned position in the game before making some dangerous move, it was intended to let players play over many weeks". InfoWorld disagreed that year, stating that save games "allow users to experiment with different approaches to the same situation". Home computers in the early 1980s had the advantage of using external media for saving, with compact cassettes and floppy disks, before finally using internal hard drives.

For cartridge-based console games, such as Taito's Mirai Shinwa Jarvas (1987), The Legend of Zelda (1987) and Kirby's Adventure (1993), saved games were stored in battery-backed random-access memory on the game cartridge itself. Pop and Chips (1985) for the Super Cassette Vision was the first-ever game to allow saving game progress on a video game console, using an AA battery on the game cassette.

In modern consoles, which use disks for storing games, saved games are stored in other ways, such as by use of memory cards or internal hard drives on the game machine itself. The use of memory cards for saving game data dates back to SNK's cartridge-based Neo Geo arcade system and home console in 1990.

Depending on the game, a player will have the ability to save the game either at any arbitrary point (usually when the game has been paused), after a specific task has been completed (such as at the end of a level), or at designated areas within the game known as save points.

The available ways to save a game affect gameplay, and can represent a practice of players or an explicit decision by designers to give the game a particular feel or alter its difficulty.

== Time and location of saving ==
A video game may allow the user to save at any point of the game at any time. There are also modified versions of this. For example, in the GameCube game Eternal Darkness, the player can save at almost any time, but only if no enemies are in the room. To make gaming more engaging, some video games may impose a limit on the number of times a player saves the game. For instance, IGI 2 allows only a handful of saves in each mission; Max Payne 2 imposes this restriction on the highest level of difficulty.

Some video games only allow the game to be saved at predetermined points in the game, called save points (Not to be confused with "checkpoints"). Save points are employed either because the game is too complex to allow saving at any given point or to attempt to make the game more challenging by forcing the player to rely on their skills instead of on the ability to retry indefinitely. Save points are easier to program and thus attractive from a development standpoint.

Some games use a hybrid system where both save anywhere and save points are used. For example, Final Fantasy VII permits saving anywhere when the player is traveling on the world map, but once the player enters a location (e.g. town, cavern or forest), saving is only possible at save points.

=== "Savescumming" ===
Overusing saved games may be seen as unfair and in such a context is referred to as "savescumming". Savescumming makes losing a game impossible because whenever the player loses or is about to lose, a savegame is loaded, effectively turning back time to the situation before the loss. In a video game, this could for example be done when the player loses a battle/race, misses the best performance grading for a level (such as an S-rank) or runs into an unwinnable situation by losing anyone or anything needed to continue and win. For example, in a game that features a casino, the player could save the game and then bet all their in-game money on black at a roulette table. If the outcome is black, their money is doubled and the player saves the game again. If the outcome is red (or green), the player disregards this outcome by reloading their last savegame. This allows for an indefinite winning streak.

Game programmers may defend against savescumming by various means, such as checking timestamps. For example, on multiuser Unix systems, NetHack uses setgid to prevent users from copying save files into the necessary directory. Another technique is to use a deterministic, seeded pseudorandom number generator, so that undesired random outcomes cannot be avoided simply by saving and reloading. In this situation, when the player reloads a saved game, "random" events will occur identically every time – the only way to get a different outcome is to play differently.

== Types of saved games ==
=== Autosave ===
Game saving does not need to be manual. Some video games save the game in progress automatically, such as after the pass of a fixed amount of time, at certain predetermined points in the game as an extension to the save point concept, or when the player exits.

Some games only permit "suspend saves" in which the game is automatically saved upon exiting and reloaded upon restarting. The aim of a suspend save is only to allow the gameplay to be temporarily interrupted; as such, suspend saves are erased when the player resumes the game. This concept was popularized by Rogue and the namesake genre, which are known for employing the mechanic such that if the player were to die in the game, their save file is deleted and the game must be restarted. The term "perma-death" would come to refer to the concept used for that purpose. It is possible to cheat the system by copying and reusing suspend save files in an act of what is considered to be a form of savescumming.

=== Checkpoints ===
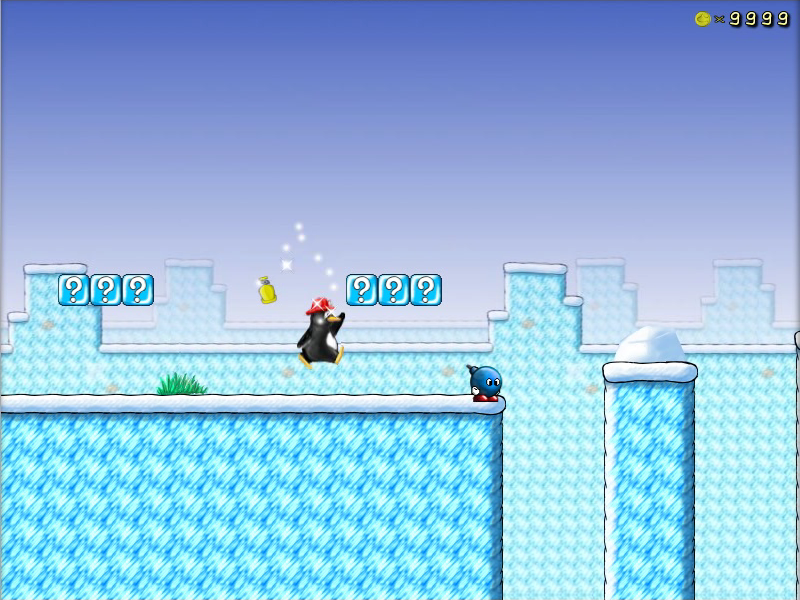
Tux passes a checkpoint (the yellow bell) in the video game SuperTux.

"Checkpoints" are locations in a video game where a player character respawns after death. Characters generally respawn at the last checkpoint that they have reached. A respawn is most often due to the death of the in-game character, but it can also be caused by the failure to meet an objective required to advance in the game. Checkpoints might be temporary, as they stop working when the player loses their last life, completes or quits the level, especially in platform games. Most modern games, however, save the game to memory at these points, known as auto-saving.

Checkpoints might be visible or invisible to the player. Visible checkpoints might give a player a sense of security when activated, but in turn sacrifice some immersion, as checkpoints are intrinsically "gamey" and might even need an explanation of how they work unless they are diegetic. Invisible checkpoints do not break immersion but may make players unsure of where they will respawn, if the heads-up display does not give a visible indication that a checkpoint was reached.

=== Quick-saving ===
Quick-saving and quick-loading allow the player to save or load the game with a single keystroke. These terms are used to differentiate between the traditional saving mechanism where the player is required to invoke a menu or dialog box, issue save the order, specify a title for the game being saved and, if applicable, confirm whether an old saved game file with the same title should be overwritten. The term "quick save" may be used in video games that lack the traditional saving mechanism altogether.

The advantage of quick saving is its low burden: The player only has to press a button and, if applicable, wait a few seconds. The disadvantage is the automatic loss of the previous quick-saved game. Games that only offer quick saving may be impossible to play by two different players (or more) unless there is a mechanism to distinguish players, such as user accounts. Leaving the decision of when to save up to the player increases the likelihood that a save will be made during a less than favourable game state. A quicksave shortly before an event which kills the player creates what is known as a death loop.

=== Password ===
Passwords are a form of saved game not stored on non-volatile memory. Instead, everything needed to reconstruct the game state is encoded in and displayed on-screen as a string of text, usually comprising random alphanumeric characters, and the player can then record or memorize it. The player may later resume play from that point by entering the same password. Passwords were widely used by home console games before the advent of non-volatile memory and later internal and external storage.

=== Save states ===
A "save state" is a form of a saved game in emulators. A save state is generated when the emulator stores the contents of random-access memory of an emulated program to disk. Save states enable players to save their games even when the emulated game or system does not support the feature. For instance, save states may be used to circumvent saving restrictions or as a savescumming technique. An associated concept is save state hacking, the practice of which uses a hex editor to modify the save states to alter gameplay conditions, usually in favor of the player. Save states are comparable to snapshots of a computer system's state or hibernation in computing, with save states being a limited form of snapshots.

Save states have started to receive mainstream usage in the early 2010s with Nintendo's Virtual Console. Some Wii U and 3DS Virtual Console titles allow players to save a "restore point," which is like a quick save but has no restrictions on reloading. Although likely derived from quick saves, restore points are functionally identical to save states, and can be used for many of the same purposes. The Switch's "Nintendo Classics" software has a similar feature, referred to as "suspend points", which are also functionally identical to save states.

== Presentation ==
Game designers often attempt to integrate the save points into the style of the game using skeuomorphism. Resident Evil represents save points with old fashioned typewriters (which require an ink ribbon item for each save), the Grand Theft Auto series used representations appropriate to the era of the setting: cassette tapes for the mid-1980s (Grand Theft Auto: Vice City), 3½-inch disks for the early-1990s (Grand Theft Auto: San Andreas), and compact discs for the late-1990s (Grand Theft Auto: Liberty City Stories).

Although save points are typically seen as boons, some games have traps which use this tendency to fool the player. In Chrono Trigger, attempting to use a fake save point in Magus's castle can actually bring the party into battle.

Some games employ limits to saving in order to prevent players from using them as a primary means of succeeding in the game. In the console versions of Tomb Raider (1996) & Tomb Raider III save points are consumed upon use, Donkey Kong Country 2: Diddy's Kong Quest charges two banana coins to use a save point more than once, and in Resident Evil the player must find and expend an ink ribbon for each save.

In some games, save games or save points are part of the plot. In Chrono Cross, save points are called Records of Fate, managed by an entity called FATE, an antagonist that uses the save points to control people. In Anonymous;Code, the protagonist Pollon Takaoka has a unique ability to save and load save games, which is central to the plot and the main game mechanic.

Another way saved games interact with each other is through passing along data to sequels. A famous example of this is the first three installments of the Wizardry series. To play the second and third installments, players needed to import the characters they'd used in the previous installment, which retained all experience and equipment gained in that installment. Later versions of the games made this feature optional, as do franchises such as the Fire Emblem, Shenmue and .hack series. Video games may also take the saved games of other video games into account; for example, the character Rosalina becomes available on Mario Kart Wii if there is a Super Mario Galaxy save on the console. The save game of Midnight Club 3: DUB Edition can be imported to the Remix version of the game.

== Save sharing ==
For many years, sharing game saves among friends has been very common. From trading passwords to swapping memory cards, gamers have always been able to help each other out to unlock features in a game. With the growing popularity of the Internet, many people upload their game saves to help out their online friends. However, with the inclusion of a progress meter or "gamerscore" that tracks player progress in games for the Xbox 360, many players are beginning to view those who load other people's files onto their systems as "cheaters". Some games such as Grand Theft Auto IV attempt to prevent the use of saved games made by other users. In contrast, The Legend of Zelda: Oracle of Seasons and Oracle of Ages actively encourages players that have completed the game to share their progress with others via a password swapping side quest that is available after finishing the main story.

== Arcade games ==
Saved games have generally been rare at arcades, but have found some use, notably in the Konami e-Amusement system, Bandai Namco's Bandai Namco Passport, or Banapassport system, or by the use of PlayStation cards, as in Dance Dance Revolution. Space Invaders, released by Taito in 1978, was from the first arcade games to make use of microchip technology, which allowed scores to be saved. This introduced the goal for players to collect as many points as possible, which brought the concept of infinity into games. These generally use either a magnetic card to store the data, a card that stores data through network (internet) connection or through a server, or some combination thereof. Similarly, passwords have generally been rare at arcades, with occasional exceptions, such as Gauntlet Legends.

== See also ==
- Core dump
