= You Only Live Once (video game) =

2009 video game

- Developer: Marcus Richert
- Publisher: Kongregate Games
- Composer: Mark Jefferis
- Engine: Flash
- Platform: Browser
- Release: 2009
- Genres: Platformer, metagame
- Mode: Single-player

You Only Live Once is a 2009 Flash platformer by game developer Marcus Richert, designed to be only playable once, not allowing the player another chance after dying in the game, even if it is restarted. It was a finalist at Sense of Wonder Night at the Tokyo Game Show 2009. It has together with One Chance been frequently cited in computer game academia as an example of the game mechanic permadeath. It has been also called a metagame and a "response" to Super Mario Bros. or an "affectionate parody of the tendency of video games to trivialise victims."

== Gameplay ==
The game plays out like a typical platform game until the player either inadvertently dies or beats the game. Though there are a number of playable levels, all designed to be playable and fun, and a boss fight awaiting at the end of the game, most players won't make it that far. Hitting the "Continue" button after dying plays a sequence of humorous cutscenes dealing with the aftermath of the player's death. Restarting the game by reloading it only brings up the grave of the dead player character. The game uses cache memory and temporary internet files to remain unplayable. One player on Kongregate noted that he was still unable to play the game again after having played it on Newgrounds a few years prior. Some players were however able to figure out how to hack the game to re-play it, and several successful play-throughs of the game are available on YouTube.

== Plot ==
The player takes the role of the crooked-legged, cross-eyed Jemaine who, much in the manner of Super Mario, goes to the castle of a giant, pink lizard named Sir Giant Pink Lizard to rescue his kidnapped girlfriend.

== Reception ==
The platforming part of the game was described as "rather average" by Adrien Guilloteau in Le Figaro, but the cutscenes "quite fun." Keita Takahashi, designer of Katamari Damacy, remarked he liked the "corniness" of the game. In a feature on metagames, Jaime San Simón of Eurogamer described it as Richert's most interesting game. It was included on Gamasutra's list of the 99 best free games of 2009 where it was described as "Conceptually... a real triumph." The game was included in the book The Game Designer's Playlist - Innovative Games Every Game Designer Needs to Play by Zack Hiwiller and 250 Indie Games You Must Play by Mike Rose. While many players commenting on the game online were impressed with the dedication to the concept, others were angry and "raged against the game structure" because of the too high stakes and no room for error.
