= Death in video games =

Death in video games is the representation, design, and function of death, dying, mortality, and loss in video games. It includes death as a failure state, death as a reversible play cycle, saved games and respawn systems, permadeath, narrative death, grief and bereavement, mortality, and the social or political meanings of death in online worlds.

Death has been studied in game studies, media studies, human–computer interaction, phenomenology, and scholarship on grief and bereavement. Researchers have examined the tension between death as a serious fictional or existential event and death as a rule-based game mechanic that can often be reversed through reloading, retrying, or respawning. Scholarship has also considered how death mechanics affect player experience, how permanent death changes play, and how games can represent grief, attachment, mourning, and reflection on mortality.

== Scholarship and scope ==
Death in video games overlaps with, but is not limited to, the concepts of game over, respawn, saved games, and permadeath. Those topics describe particular mechanics or states, while the broader topic of death in games includes representation, player experience, narrative consequence, grief, mortality, and social meaning. Diana and Vlad Melnic describe a central dilemma in representing death in games: death may be presented as meaningful or tragic while game systems often allow players to undo it through saved games, respawn timers, or repeated attempts.

Lisbeth Klastrup's study of death in massively multiplayer online games examines the staging and implementation of death and death penalties in gameworlds. Klastrup argues that death can be both trivial and non-trivial depending on the design of the penalty, the player's experience, and the social context of the gameworld. Later work has expanded the subject beyond death penalties to include player death, permanent death, grief, bereavement, mortality, and the political meanings of death in virtual spaces.

== Death as a failure state ==
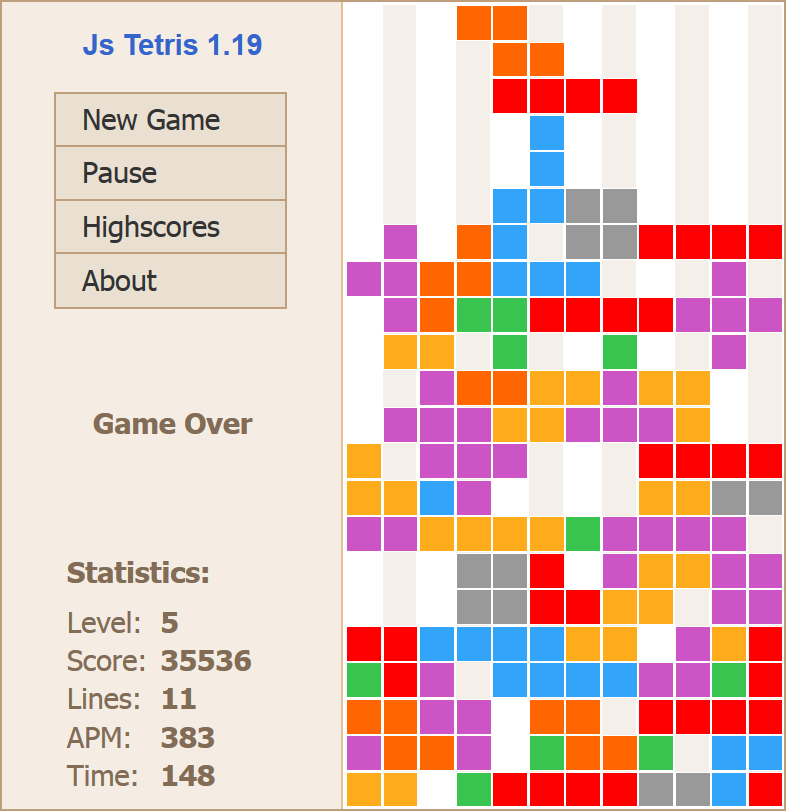
A game over screen in an open-source Tetris-style game. In many video games, death or failure returns the player to an earlier state or requires another attempt.

In many video games, death marks a failure state. A player character may die after losing all health, falling into hazards, being defeated by enemies, or failing a timed objective. The result may be a game over screen, a restart from a checkpoint, or temporary removal from play.

Death as failure is tied to challenge, learning, and repetition. In research on platform games, Marjorie Ann M. Cuerdo and Edward F. Melcer describe player death as central to many game experiences because it affects perceptions of difficulty and core aspects of game user experience. Failure through death can produce frustration, tension, suspense, relief, or satisfaction when the player eventually succeeds. In a study of Dark Souls III, Serge Petralito and colleagues found that avatar death and high challenge could support positive player experiences under some conditions.

== Death as a reversible play cycle ==
A common feature of video game death is reversibility. Unlike death in many literary or cinematic narratives, the death of a player character often returns the player to an earlier state and allows repeated attempts. Olli Tapio Leino uses the concept of the "death loop" to discuss repeated death and retrying as part of the player's encounter with a game. Rather than treating repeated death only as a design flaw, Leino argues that death loops can be understood as features of the playable artifact that shape the player's experience of the game world and its rules.

In this model, death often functions as part of a cycle: the player fails, the character dies, the game resets to a prior position, and the player returns with greater knowledge of the challenge and more practice in the process of overcoming it. The meaning of death is therefore partly procedural. It is not only an event in the fiction but also a mechanism for learning, repetition, mastery, and progression.

== Saved games and respawn timers ==
Saved games, checkpoints, and respawn timers affect how strongly death changes the player's progress. A forgiving checkpoint may make death a short interruption, while a distant save point or severe penalty can make death more consequential. These systems shape the player's sense of risk, difficulty, and loss.

Cuerdo and Melcer developed a taxonomy of death and rebirth in platform games, identifying five major aspects: obstacles, death conditions, aesthetics, changes to player progress, and respawn locations. Later work by Cuerdo, Anika Mahajan, and Melcer examined how different respawn locations affected player experience. Their study compared respawning at the start of the game, start of the level, checkpoint, and savepoint, and found that death and respawn systems could affect measures such as autonomy, curiosity, mastery, and immersion.

Melnic and Melnic argue that saved games and respawn systems create a representational tension. They allow games to include death while also making it possible for players to revise, repeat, or erase the event. This can weaken the sense of loss normally associated with death, but it can also allow games to explore mortality through mechanical contrast, frustration, or repetition.

== Permadeath and consequence ==
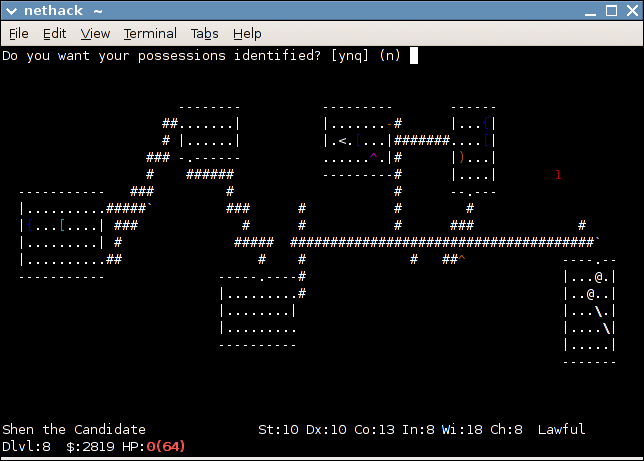
A death screen in NetHack. The game is commonly associated with permadeath systems.

Permadeath is one subtopic within death in video games. It refers to systems in which character death is permanent or has unusually severe consequences, such as removing a character from play, deleting progress, resetting a world, or forcing the player to begin again. Because permadeath reduces the reversibility associated with many forms of game death, it is often discussed as a way to increase risk, tension, attachment, and emotional consequence.

Brendan Keogh's study of permanent death in Minecraft argues that permanent death can help players create "living stories" because actions and risks cannot be easily undone. In studies of DayZ, Marcus Carter, Martin Gibbs, Greg Wadley, and Fraser Allison examine how severe death consequences affect player attitudes and experiences of risk, fear, and meaningful play.

== Narrative death ==
Death in video games may also occur as part of narrative structure rather than as a consequence of player failure. A character may die in a cutscene, dialogue sequence, scripted event, or unavoidable ending. Such deaths can shape the player's interpretation of the story, characters, relationships, and themes.

Narrative death may work differently from mechanical death. A character's death in a story may be irreversible even when ordinary player death is reversible. This contrast can make narrative deaths feel more consequential than repeated mechanical deaths. Harrer's study of grief and game design analyzes games including Final Fantasy VII, Ico, Passage, Brothers: A Tale of Two Sons, and Shelter, treating death not merely as failure but as a way of representing relationships, attachment, and loss.

== Grief and bereavement ==
Some video games represent death through grief, mourning, caregiving, or memorialization. These games may avoid the conventional model of loss as failure and instead use interaction to express attachment, care, or bereavement. Harrer argues that games can make difficult personal feelings more tangible through mechanics, audiovisual design, character relationships, and embodied player action.

A JAMA article on That Dragon, Cancer describes the game as an exploration of end of life through an "unwinnable" video game, focusing on its representation of a child with cancer and the family's experience of terminal illness. Research on Spiritfarer has examined how a commercial death-themed game may help some players reflect on or cope with the loss of a loved one.

These grief-oriented works differ from games in which death primarily functions as an obstacle to mastery. In grief-oriented games, death may be irreversible, emotionally central, or connected to memory and care, rather than simply a condition to avoid or overcome.

== Mortality and finitude ==
Death in video games can also be used to frame mortality and finitude. Andrea Andiloro describes video games as media that can mediate existential themes of mortality through formal mechanics and narrative structures. Drawing on phenomenology, Andiloro argues that games can transform abstract mortality into tangible experiences through play, failure, repetition, and embodied interaction.

This approach treats death in games not only as punishment or failure but also as a way of confronting impermanence. In such cases, the player may be asked to reflect on time, memory, ageing, regret, or the impossibility of control. Games that frame death in this way can use interaction to make mortality part of the player's experience rather than only part of the game's story.

== Social and political meanings in online worlds ==
Death in online games and virtual worlds can have social and political meanings. In multiplayer environments, death penalties and respawn systems affect not only individual progress but also social experience, group activity, shared spaces, and player stories.

Peter Christiansen uses the term "thanatogaming" to discuss death as a rhetorical and political act in virtual worlds. His study argues that in-game death can have force as a form of resistance to both physical and virtual forms of power, drawing on examples from America's Army and World of Warcraft.
