= Game over =

Message which signals that the game has ended

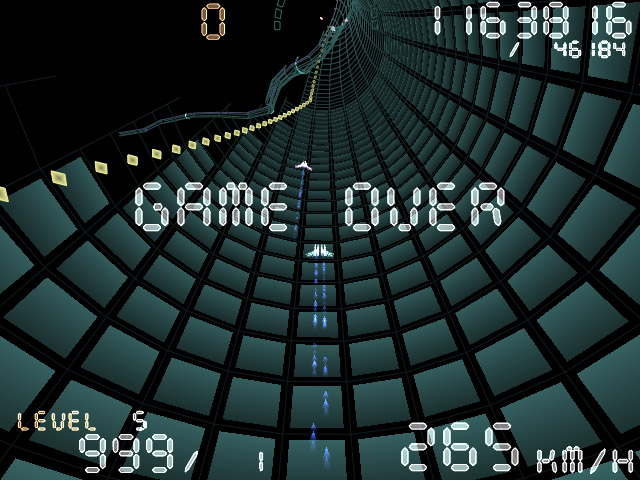
"Game over" screen from the game Torus Trooper

Gameplay footage of Mini Metro where the player reaches a loss condition and the game ends

"Game over" is a message in video games that informs the player that their play session has ended, usually because the player has reached a loss condition, such as character death. It also sometimes appears at the successful completion of a session, especially in games designed for arcades, after the player has exhausted the game's supply of new challenges. The phrase has since been turned into quasi-slang, usually describing an event that will cause significant harm, injury, bad luck, or even death to a person. However, since the turn of the century, it has largely fallen out of fashion in favor of unlimited lives and endless checkpoints with autosaves, although it very much remains the norm in arcades, as they require payment inserts.

== History ==
The phrase was used as early as 1950 in devices such as electro-mechanical pinball machines, which would light up the phrase with a lamp (lightbulb). Before the advent of home consoles and personal computing, arcades were the predominant platform for playing games, which required users to deposit a token or coin into an arcade game machine to play. Most early arcade video games typically had the game end when a timer ran out, with shoot 'em up game Space Invaders (1978) later popularizing a game over triggered by the player getting killed by enemies (either by being shot or enemies reaching the player), with the player given a finite number of lives before the game ends.

During the golden age of arcade video games, players would usually be given a finite number of lives (or attempts) to progress through the game, the exhaustion of which would usually result in the display of the message "Game over" indicating that the game had ended. The phrase might also be followed by the message "Play Again?" and a prompt asking the player to insert additional tokens to prevent the game from terminating and instead allowing the player to continue their progress. The message can also be seen flashing on certain arcade games while in attract mode, until a player inserts a credit; at this point the message would change to the number of credits inserted and "Press 1 or 2 player start", or some variation thereof.

As these games were ported to home consoles, the "Game over" screen and "Continue?" prompt remained, but often required only the press of a button to keep the game going; while the video game industry shifted away from being arcade-focused to being home gaming-focused, the inclusion of such a screen was no longer as critical since it offered no financial benefit. However, the concept of Game Over remained imbued in the medium thereafter as a way to add an element of risk: a player who is unsuccessful at carrying out the game's objective (possibly repeatedly) will be faced with such a screen and be forced to start over from either the beginning of the game or level, or to a previous, saved state.

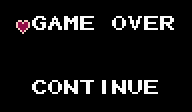
Screenshot from the game Kamen no Ninja Akakage when losing all lives

Certain games ask players with no more lives to continue or to choose "game over" in a menu. Kamen no Ninja Akakage released in 1988 by Toei for the Family Computer has "game over" on top of "continue" with a cursor to be properly positioned to get the desired choice. A number of free-to-play mobile games, however, can and have profited from a continue mechanic to pressure players into investing some money into gathering resources or currency needed to buy a continue to prevent an effort to accomplish something important in the game (such as beating a high score or clearing a very difficult level) from being completely negated by a game over.

With the development of the aforementioned save function (complemented by the less popular password system, which is now seen as archaic), the Game Over message has become less common as players are allowed to respawn at a previous state of the game, which has been stored in memory either through a player deliberately saving the game or reaching a checkpoint (which causes the game to save automatically). Many modern games do not technically "end" until they are completed, and although "Game over" screens remain present in many of them in some form or another, it is uncommon for them to signify a forced return to the beginning of the game, and only marginally more common for them to signify a substantial loss of progress. Roguelikes are the most common exception to this rule; permadeath is often a staple of the genre.

== Variations ==
"Game over" has seen many variations. For instance in Little King's Story, the message "LIFE OVER" appears upon the death of the player's character. Nights into Dreams... and Nights: Journey of Dreams use "NIGHT OVER". Antarctic Adventure and Sonic the Hedgehog use "TIME OVER".

Screens that display at equivalent points are considered "Game over" screens, even if the message that is displayed is entirely different, such as "YOU ARE DEAD" used in Resident Evil, God of War, and Left 4 Dead, "YOU DIED" seen in Dark Souls, Cuphead, and Minecraft (though Minecraft uses "Game over" if one dies in hardcore mode), "GOOD NIGHT" seen in Klonoa and Luigi's Mansion.

The 2020 Nintendo 3DS game The Queen TV-Game 2 uses an expletive to parody player frustration. The 1980 arcade game Missile Command uses "The End", a game over screen that is usually seen upon achieving victory. Red Dead Redemption and its prequel, Red Dead Redemption 2, both simply use "DEAD" upon the player's death. More variations include "THE WITCH HUNTS ARE OVER" used in the Bayonetta series, "YOU WERE SLAIN" in Terraria, "TOO BAD!" in Super Mario Sunshine, "DRIVER DOWN" in Hill Climb Racing, and "WASTED" in the Grand Theft Auto franchise.

Some games give specific losing screens and sequence different from the usual one. For example, Plants vs. Zombies may tell the player "All your pet zombies have perished!" and "You survived for (number of flags completed)!!"

Other games with definite loss conditions may not show a particular game over message at all, and instead take the player through a loading screen to immediately resume play from the last checkpoint, such as Tomb Raider Anniversary and Marvel's Guardians of the Galaxy.

== Outside video gaming ==
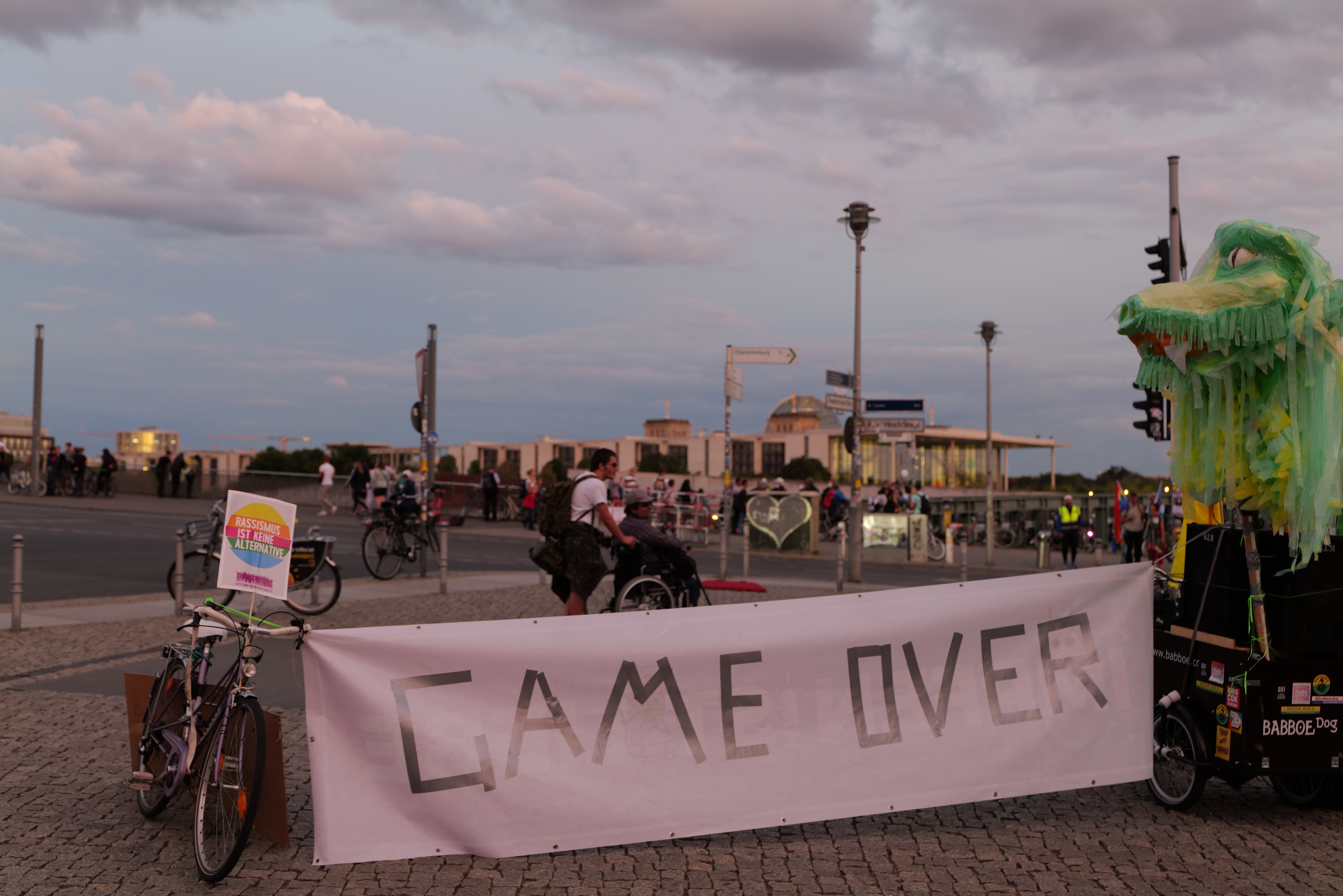
A "game over" banner at an anti-fascist protest in Berlin, 2020

The phrase is occasionally used to indicate the end of an argument or process in real life. In January 2011, protesters and rioters in several North African and Middle Eastern countries used the slogan "Game over" on banners to express their anti-government sentiments.

"Game over" is also sometimes used as a phrase to concede defeat, as for example in the movie Aliens where one of the protagonists, Private William Hudson (Bill Paxton), shouts, "Game over, man. Game over!" after the dropship meant to rescue him and his expedition is destroyed. Paxton's use of the phrase was included in shortened form in the SNES game adaptation of Alien 3, although the Hudson character did not appear in the film. The "Game Over" quote is heard in full after the final ball is drained in Zen Studios' virtual pinball adaptation of Aliens. The "game over" line was not in the Aliens script, but was ad libbed by Paxton.

The phrase is also used various times in the Saw movie series, because of the antagonist's penchant for referring to the traps he creates as "games".

Some gamebooks utilize this phrase as well. Each book in the Nintendo Adventure Book series has only one good ending, with all of the bad ones saying "Game Over".

In music, rapper Lil' Flip released a 2004 single titled "Game Over (Flip)", which prominently samples sounds from the classic arcade games Pac-Man and Ms. Pac-Man. The track reached #15 on the Billboard Hot 100 and became a platinum-selling hit. The unauthorized use of game sound effects led to a lawsuit from Namco, which was later settled.

== See also ==
- 1-up
- Saved game
- Branching storylines in videogames
- Kill screen
