= Massively multiplayer online role-playing game =

Video game genre

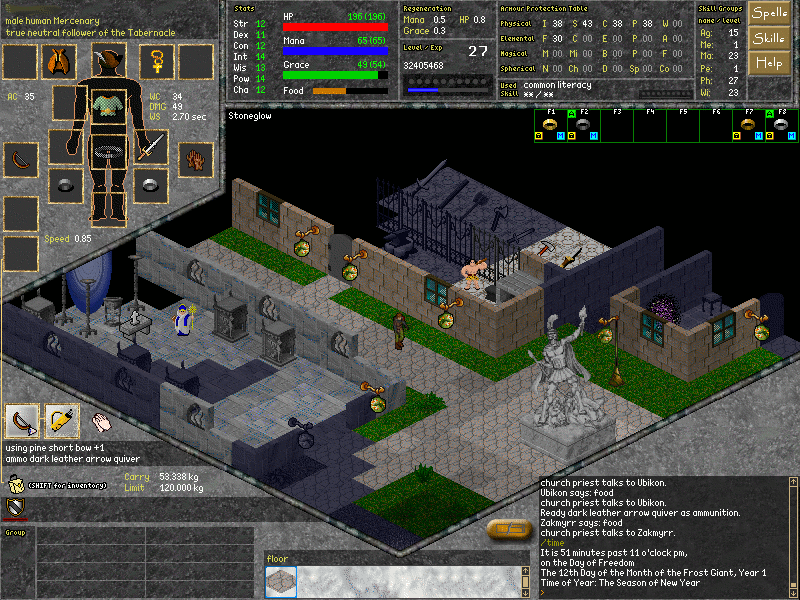
A village in Daimonin.

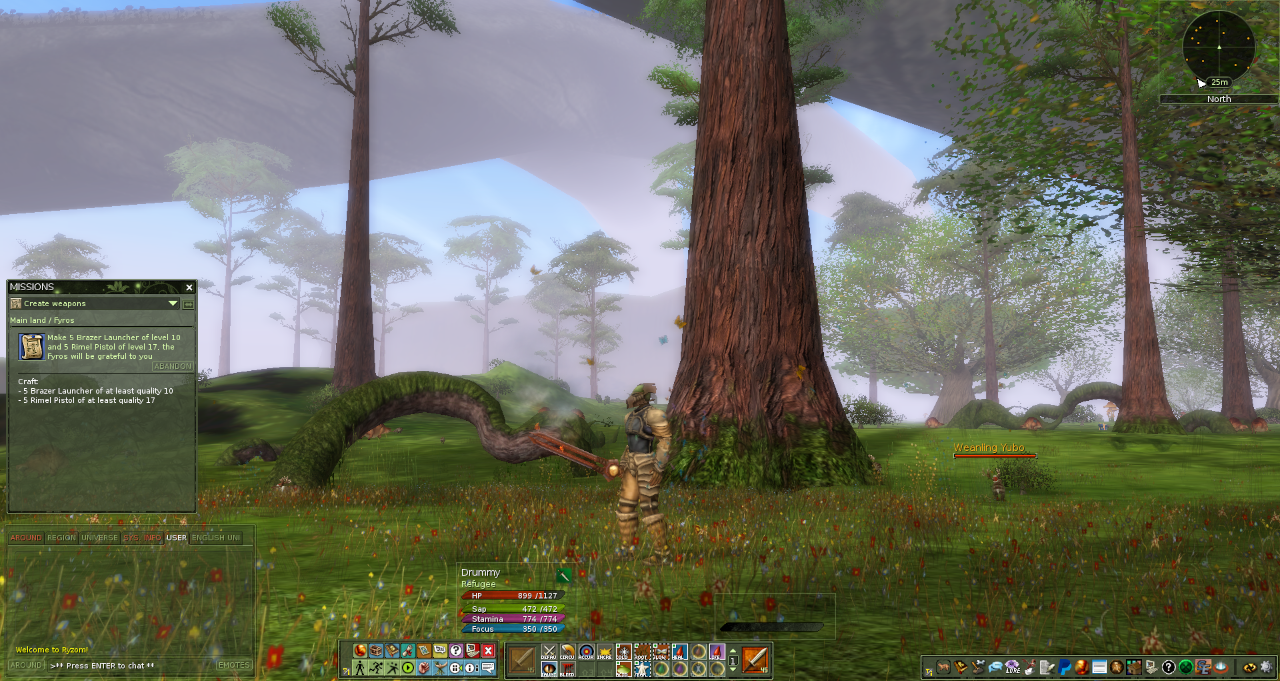
Screenshot of Ryzom.

A massively multiplayer online role-playing game (MMORPG) is a video game that combines aspects of a role-playing video game and a massively multiplayer online game.

As in role-playing games (RPGs), the player assumes the role of a character (often in a fantasy world or science-fiction world) and takes control over many of that character's actions. MMORPGs are distinguished from single-player or small multi-player online RPGs by the number of players able to interact together, and by the game's persistent world (usually hosted by the game's publisher), which continues to exist and evolve while the player is offline and away from the game.

MMORPGs are played throughout the world. Global revenues for MMORPGs exceeded half a billion dollars in 2005, and the western world's revenues exceeded a billion dollars in 2006. In 2008, the spending on subscription MMORPGs by consumers in North America and Europe grew to $1.4 billion. World of Warcraft, a popular MMORPG, had over 10 million subscribers as of November 2014. World of Warcraft's total revenue was $1.04 billion US dollars in 2014. Star Wars: The Old Republic, released in 2011, became the world's "fastest-growing subscription MMO in history" after gaining more than 1 million players within the first three days of its launch.

== Common features ==
Although modern MMORPGs sometimes differ dramatically from their predecessors, many of them share the same basic characteristics. These include several common features:

- persistent game environment
- some form of level progression
- social interaction within the game
- in-game culture
- membership in a group
- character customization.

=== Themes ===
The majority of popular MMORPGs are based on traditional fantasy themes, often occurring in an in-game universe comparable to that of Dungeons & Dragons. Some employ hybrid themes that either merge or replace fantasy elements with those of science fiction, sword and sorcery, or crime fiction. Others draw thematic material from American comic books, the occult, and other genres. These elements are often developed using similar tasks and scenarios involving quests, monsters, and loot.

=== Progression ===
In nearly all MMORPGs, the development of the player's character is the primary goal. Nearly all MMORPGs feature a character progression system, in which players earn experience points for their actions and use those points to reach character "levels", which makes them better at whatever they do. Traditionally, combat with monsters and completing quests for non-player characters, either alone or in groups, are the primary ways to earn experience points. The accumulation of wealth (including combat-useful items) is also a way to progress in many MMORPGs. This is traditionally best accomplished via combat. The cycle produced by these conditions, combat leading to new items allowing for more combat with no change in gameplay, is sometimes pejoratively referred to as the level treadmill, or "grinding". The role-playing game Progress Quest was created as a parody of this trend. Eve Online, a space-based MMORPG, uses an alternative method of progression where users train skills in real-time rather than using experience points as a measure of progression.

In some MMORPGs, there is no limit to a player's level, allowing the grinding experience to continue indefinitely. MMORPGs that use this model often glorify top ranked players by displaying their avatars on the game's website or posting their stats on a high score screen. Another common practice is to enforce a maximum reachable level for all players, often referred to as a level cap. Once reached, the definition of a player's progression changes. Instead of being awarded primarily with experience for completing quests and dungeons, the player's motivation to continue playing will be replaced with collecting money and equipment.

Often, the widened range of equipment available at the maximum level will have increased aesthetic value to distinguish high ranking players in game between lower ranked players. Colloquially known as endgame gear, this set of empowered weapons and armor adds a competitive edge to both scripted boss encounters as well as player vs player combat. Player motivation to outperform others is fueled by acquiring such items and is a significant determining factor in their success or failure in combat-related situations.

=== Social interaction ===
MMORPGs almost always have tools to facilitate communication between players. Many MMORPGs offer support for in-game guilds or clans, though these will usually form whether the game supports them or not.

In addition, most MMOGs require some degree of teamwork in parts of the game. These tasks usually require players to take on roles in the group, such as protecting other players from damage (called tanking), "healing" damage done to other players or damaging enemies.

MMORPGs generally have Game Moderators or Game Masters (frequently referred to as GMs or "mods"), who may be paid employees or unpaid volunteers who attempt to supervise the world. Some GMs may have additional access to features and information related to the game that are not available to other players and roles.

Relationships formed in MMORPGs can often be just as intense as relationships formed between friends or partners met outside the game, and often involve elements of collaboration and trust between players.

=== Roleplaying ===
Most MMORPGs provide different types of classes that players can choose. Among those classes, a small portion of players choose to roleplay their characters, and there are rules that provide functionality and content to those who do. Community resources such as forums and guides exist in support of this play style.

For example, if a player wants to play a priest role in his MMORPG world, that player might buy a cope from a shop and learn priestly skills, proceeding to speak, act, and interact with others as their character would. This may or may not include pursuing other goals such as wealth or experience. Guilds or similar groups with a focus on roleplaying may develop extended in-depth narratives using the setting and resources similar to those in the game world.

=== Culture ===
Over time, the MMORPG community has developed a sub-culture with its own slang and metaphors, as well as an unwritten list of social rules and taboos. Players will often complain about 'grind' (a slang term for any repetitive, time-consuming activity in an MMORPG), or talk about 'buffs' and 'nerfs' (respectively an upgrade or downgrade of a particular game mechanic).

As with all such cultures, social rules exist for such things as invitations to join an adventuring party, the proper division of treasure, and how a player is expected to behave while grouped with other players.

== Infrastructure and monetization ==
=== System architecture ===
Most MMORPGs are deployed using a client–server system architecture. The server software generates a persistent instance of the virtual world that runs continuously, and players connect to it via a client software. The client software may provide access to the entire playing world, or further 'expansions' may be required to be purchased to allow access to certain areas of the game. EverQuest and Guild Wars are two examples of games that use such a format. Players generally must purchase the client software for a one-time fee, although an increasing trend is for MMORPGs to work using pre-existing "thin" clients, such as a web browser.

Depending on the number of players and the system architecture, an MMORPG might be run on multiple separate servers, each representing an independent world, where players from one server cannot interact with those from another; World of Warcraft is a prominent example, with each separate server housing several thousand players. In many MMORPGs the number of players in one world is often limited to around a few thousand, but a notable example of the opposite is EVE Online, which accommodates several hundred thousand players on the same server, with over 60,000 playing simultaneously (June 2010) at certain times. Some games allow characters to appear on any world, but not simultaneously (such as Seal Online: Evolution or Kolossium competition in Dofus); others limit each character to the world in which it was created. World of Warcraft has experimented with "cross-realm" (i.e. cross-server) interaction in player vs player "battlegrounds", using server clusters or "battlegroups" to co-ordinate players looking to participate in structured player vs player content such as the Warsong Gulch or Alterac Valley battlegrounds. Additionally, patch 3.3, released on December 8, 2009, introduced a cross-realm "looking for group" system to help players form groups for instanced content (though not for open-world questing) from a larger pool of characters than their home server can necessarily provide.

=== Business models ===
MMORPGs today use a wide range of business models, from free of charge, free with microtransactions, advertise funded, to various kinds of payment plans. Some MMORPGs require payment or a monthly subscription to play. By definition, "massively multiplayer" games are always online, and most require some sort of continuous revenue (such as monthly subscriptions and advertisements) for maintenance and development purposes. Some games, such as Guild Wars, have disposed of the 'monthly fee' model entirely, and recover costs directly through sales of the software and associated expansion packs. Still others adopt a micropayment model where the core content is free, but players are given the option to purchase additional content, such as equipment, aesthetic items, or pets. Games that make use of this model often have originated in Korea, such as Flyff and MapleStory. This business model is alternately called "pay for perks" or "freemium", and games using it often describe themselves with the term "free-to-play".

- Free-to-play (F2P) means that there is no cost to purchase the software and there is no subscription charge. Variably applies to traditionally bought and forever available games (see Buy-to-play below). Most newer MMOs that fall under this category now includes microtransactions however, which causes them to overlap with the Freemium model.
- Freemium (a portmanteau of free-to-play and premium) means that the majority or all of the game's content is available for free but players can pay for extra content, character customization, added perks or faster advancement into the game via microtransactions. Freemium thus overlaps with both the free-to-play and pay-to-play models.
- Buy-to-play (B2P) means that the MMO can only be played by purchasing the game, but there is no subsequent subscription fee for playing the game. These games may or may not include additional microtransactions, or may sell additional content in the form of expansions instead of asking for an ongoing subscription fee.
- Pay-to-play (P2P) means that the MMO requires a monthly subscription fee or other ongoing fee in order to continue playing the game. It may also require an up-front purchase of the game in addition to the monthly subscription fee, though many of these up-front purchases include a month of game time. This was once the most common way for MMOs to finance themselves, but has fallen out of favor in recent years as an increasing number of games have switched to other business models due to difficulty in retaining a stable playerbase.

== History ==
MUD1, an early multi-user game

MMORPG is a term coined by Richard Garriott to refer to massive multiplayer online role-playing games and their social communities. Previous to this and related coinages, these games were generally called graphical MUDs; the history of MMORPGs traces back directly through the MUD genre. Through this connection, MMORPGs can be seen to have roots in the earliest multi-user games such as Mazewar (1974) and MUD1 (1978). 1985 saw the release of a roguelike (pseudo-graphical) MUD called Island of Kesmai on CompuServe and Lucasfilm's graphical MUD Habitat. The first fully graphical multi-user RPG was Neverwinter Nights, which was delivered through America Online in 1991 and was personally championed by AOL President Steve Case. Other early proprietary graphical online RPGs include three on The Sierra Network: The Shadow of Yserbius in 1992, The Fates of Twinion in 1993, and The Ruins of Cawdor in 1995. Another milestone came in 1995 as NSFNET restrictions were lifted, opening the Internet up for game developers, which allowed for the first truly "massively"-scoped titles. Finally, MMORPGs as defined today began with Meridian 59 in 1996, innovative both in its scope and in offering first-person 3D graphics, with The Realm Online appearing nearly simultaneously. Ultima Online, released in 1997, is often credited with first popularizing the genre, though more mainstream attention was garnered by 1999's EverQuest and Asheron's Call in the West and 1996's Nexus: The Kingdom of the Winds in South Korea.

The financial success of these early titles has ensured competition in the genre since that time. MMORPG titles now exist on consoles and in new settings. In 2008, the market for MMORPGs had Blizzard Entertainment's World of Warcraft dominating as the largest MMORPG, alongside other titles such as Final Fantasy XIV and Star Wars: The Old Republic, though an additional market exists for free-to-play MMORPGs, which are supported by advertising and purchases of in-game items. This free-to-play model is particularly common in South Korea such as MapleStory, Rohan: Blood Feud, Atlantica Online and Lost Ark. Also, there are some free-to-play games, such as RuneScape and Tibia, where the game is free, but one would have to pay monthly to play the game with more features. Guild Wars and its sequel avoid some degree of competition with other MMORPGs by only requiring the initial purchase of the game to play.

== Development ==
The cost of developing a competitive commercial MMORPG title often exceeded $10 million in 2003. These projects require multiple disciplines within game design and development such as 3D modeling, 2D art, animation, user interfaces, client/server engineering, database architecture, and network infrastructure.

The front-end (or client) component of a commercial, modern MMORPG features 3D graphics. As with other modern 3D games, the front-end requires expertise with implementing 3D engines, real-time shader techniques and physics simulation. The actual visual content (areas, creatures, characters, weapons, spaceships and so forth) is developed by artists who typically begin with two-dimensional concept art, and later convert these concepts into animated 3D scenes, models and texture maps.

Developing an MMOG server requires expertise with client/server architecture, network protocols, security, and database design. MMORPGs include reliable systems for a number of vital tasks. The server must be able to handle and verify a large number of connections, prevent cheating, and apply changes (bug fixes or added content) to the game. A system for recording the games data at regular intervals, without stopping the game, is also important.

Maintenance requires sufficient servers and bandwidth, and a dedicated support staff. Insufficient resources for maintenance lead to lag and frustration for the players, and can severely damage the reputation of a game, especially at launch. Care must also be taken to ensure that player population remains at an acceptable level by adding or removing servers. Peer-to-peer MMORPGs could theoretically work cheaply and efficiently in regulating server load, but practical issues such as asymmetrical network bandwidth, CPU-hungry rendering engines, unreliability of individual nodes, and inherent lack of security (opening fertile new grounds for cheating) can make them a difficult proposition. The hosted infrastructure for a commercial-grade MMORPG requires the deployment of hundreds (or even thousands) of servers. Developing an affordable infrastructure for an online game requires developers to scale large numbers of players with less hardware and network investment.

In addition, the development team will need to have expertise with the fundamentals of game design: world-building, lore and game mechanics, as well as what makes games fun.

== Trends ==
As there are a number of wildly different titles within the genre, and since the genre develops so rapidly, it is difficult to definitively state that the genre is heading in one direction or another. Still, there are a few obvious developments. One of these developments is the raid group quest, or "raid", which is an adventure designed for large groups of players (often twenty or more).

=== Instance dungeons ===
Instance dungeons, sometimes shortened to "instances", are game areas that are "copied" for individual players or groups, which keeps those in the instance separated from the rest of the game world. This reduces competition, and also reduces the amount of data that needs to be sent to and from the server, reducing lag. The Realm Online was the first MMORPG to begin to use a rudimentary form of this technique and Anarchy Online would develop it further, using instances as a key element of gameplay. Since then, instancing has become increasingly common. The "raids", as mentioned above, often involve instance dungeons. Examples of games which feature instances are World of Warcraft, The Lord of the Rings Online, EverQuest, EverQuest II, Aion, Final Fantasy XIV, Guild Wars, Rift, RuneScape, Star Trek Online, Star Wars: The Old Republic, and DC Universe Online.

=== Player-created content ===
Increased amounts of "player-created content" is another trend.

=== Use of licenses ===
The use of intellectual property licensing common in other video game genres has also appeared in MMORPGs. 2007 saw the release of The Lord of the Rings Online, based on J. R. R. Tolkien's Middle-earth. Other licensed MMORPGs include The Matrix Online, based on the Matrix trilogy of films, Warhammer Online: Age of Reckoning, based on Games Workshop's table top game, Star Wars Galaxies, Star Wars: The Old Republic, Champions Online and Age of Conan.

Additionally, several licenses from television have been optioned for MMORPGs, for example Star Trek Online and Stargate Worlds (which was later canceled).

=== Console-based MMORPGs ===
The first console-based MMORPG was Phantasy Star Online for the Dreamcast. The first console-based open-world MMORPG was Final Fantasy XI for the PlayStation 2. EverQuest Online Adventures, also on the PlayStation 2, was the first console MMORPG in North America. Although console-based MMORPGs are considered more difficult to produce, the platform is gaining more attention.

=== Browser-based MMORPGs ===
With the popularization of Facebook and microtransactions came a wave of Flash and HTML5 based MMORPGs that use the free to play model. They require no download outside of a browser and usually have heavily integrated social media sharing features.

=== Smartphone-based ===
Smartphones with their GPS capabilities (amongst others) enable augmented reality in games such as Ingress and Go. The games are enhanced by location- and distance-based tracking, benchmarking goals, or facilitating trade between players.

== In society and culture ==
=== Psychological effects ===
Since the interactions between MMORPG players are real, even if the environments are virtual, psychologists and sociologists are able to use MMORPGs as tools for academic research. Sherry Turkle has found that many people have expanded their emotional range by exploring the many different roles (including gender identities) that MMORPGs allow a person to explore.

Nick Yee has surveyed more than 35,000 MMORPG players over the past several years, focusing on psychological and sociological aspects of these games. Recent findings included that 15% of players become a guild-leader at one time or another, but most generally find the job tough and thankless; and that players spend a considerable amount of time (often a third of their total time investment) doing things that are external to gameplay but part of the metagame.

Many players report that the emotions they feel while playing an MMORPG are very strong, to the extent that 8.7% of male and 23.2% of female players in a statistical study have had an online wedding. Other researchers have found that the enjoyment of a game is directly related to the social organization of a game, ranging from brief encounters between players to highly organized play in structured groups.

In a 2008 study by Zaheer Hussain and Mark D. Griffiths, it was found that just over one in five gamers (21%) said they preferred socializing online to offline. Significantly more male gamers than female gamers said that they found it easier to converse online than offline. It was also found that 57% of gamers had created a character of the opposite gender, and it is suggested that the online female persona has a number of positive social attributes.

A German fMRT-study conducted by researchers of the Central Institute of Mental Health points towards impairments in social, emotional and physical aspects of the self-concept and a higher degree in avatar identification in addicted MMORPG players, compared to non-addicted and naive (nonexperienced) people. These findings generally support Davis' cognitive behavioral model of Internet addiction, which postulates that dysfunctional self-related cognitions represent central factors contributing towards the development and maintenance of MMORPG addiction. The high degree of avatar identification found by Leménager et al. in the addicted group of this study indicates that MMORPG playing may represent an attempt to compensate for impairments in self-concept. Psychotherapeutic interventions should therefore focus on the development of coping strategies for real-life situations in which addicted players tend to experience themselves as incompetent and inferior.

Richard Bartle, author of Designing Virtual Worlds, classified multiplayer RPG-players into four primary psychological groups. His classifications were then expanded upon by Erwin Andreasen, who developed the concept into the thirty-question Bartle Test that helps players determine which category they are associated with. With over 650,000 test responses as of 2011, this is perhaps the largest ongoing survey of multiplayer game players. Based on Bartle and Yee's research, Jon Radoff has published an updated model of player motivation that focuses on immersion, competition, cooperation and achievement. These elements may be found not only in MMORPGs, but many other types of games and within the emerging field of gamification.

There have been numerous discussions and evaluations by various scholarly institutions regarding the long-term effects of video game overuse. Many news agencies have criticized video games as promoting violent tendencies in its player base and encouraging anti-social behaviors. Ultimately this culminated in the World Health Organization classifying the overuse of video games as "Technological Addiction" in May 2019.

=== Disease research ===
In World of Warcraft, a temporary design glitch attracted the attention of psychologists and epidemiologists across North America, when the "Corrupted Blood" status effect began to spread unintentionally—and uncontrollably— outside of the high-level battle it was intended to be limited to and into the wider game world. The Centers for Disease Control intended to use the incident as a research model to chart both the progression of a disease, and the potential human response to large-scale epidemic infection. However, due to Blizzard Entertainment's failure to keep statistical records of the event, the 2005 Corrupted Blood Outbreak ultimately failed to produce any results. Nevertheless, the CDC has continued to express interest in the use of MMORPGs for disease research.

=== Education ===
It has been suggested by Springer University in Germany that MMORPGs encourage and provide opportunities to study and improve in economic theory by providing a controlled environment for the natural development of economic practices between players of including professions, trade, and services.

Research has shown that for the positive learner, game-based interaction could reduce inhibition as well as enhance the enjoyment and motivation of second language learning, but appears to be more suitable for learners of intermediate and higher levels of proficiency than language beginners.

=== Therapeutic applications ===
The Division of Autism and developmental disabilities published a significant report detailing the value of MMORPGs for the treatment of individuals with autism spectrum disorder. The report suggests that individuals with autism spectrum disorder could benefit from MMORPGs by being provided a space to freely develop social skills and communication skills without the stress of face-to-face contact. This in turn opens new pathways for social therapy for individuals with developmental disabilities.

=== Economics ===
Many MMORPGs feature living economies. Virtual items and currency have to be gained through play and have definite value for players. Such a virtual economy can be analyzed (using data logged by the game) and has value in economic research. More significantly, these "virtual" economies can affect the economies of the real world.

One of the early researchers of MMORPGs was Edward Castronova, who demonstrated that a supply-and-demand market exists for virtual items and that it crosses over with the real world. This crossover has some requirements of the game:

- The ability for players to sell an item to each other for in-game (virtual) currency.
- Bartering for items between players for items of similar value.
- The purchase of in-game items for real-world currency.
- Exchanges of real-world currencies for virtual currencies.
- The invention of user-created meta-currencies such as dragon kill points to distribute in-game rewards.

The idea of attaching real-world value to "virtual" items has had a profound effect on players and the game industry, and even the courts. The virtual currency selling pioneer IGE received a lawsuit from a World of Warcraft player for interfering in the economics and intended use of the game by selling WoW gold. Castronova's first study in 2002 found that a highly liquid (if illegal) currency market existed, with the value of Everquest's in-game currency exceeding that of the Japanese yen. Some people even make a living by working these virtual economies; these people are often referred to as gold farmers, and may be employed in game sweatshops.

Game publishers usually prohibit the exchange of real-world money for virtual goods, but others actively promote the idea of linking (and directly profiting from) an exchange. In Second Life and Entropia Universe, the virtual economy and the real-world economy are directly linked. This means that real money can be deposited for game money and vice versa. Real-world items have also been sold for game money in Entropia, and some players of Second Life have generated revenues in excess of $100,000.

Bots spamming a communication channel in RuneScape to advertise illegitimate market websites

Some of the issues confronting online economies include:

- The use of "bots" or automated programs, that assist some players in accumulating in-game wealth to the disadvantage of other players.
- The use of unsanctioned auction sites, which has led publishers to seek legal remedies to prevent their use based on intellectual-property claims.
- The emergence of virtual crime, which can take the form of both fraud against the player or publisher of an online game, and even real-life acts of violence stemming from in-game transactions.

Linking real-world and virtual economies was rare in MMORPGs as of 2008, as it is generally believed to be detrimental to gameplay. If real-world wealth can be used to obtain greater, more immediate rewards than skillful gameplay, the incentive for strategic roleplay and real game involvement is diminished. It could also easily lead to a skewed hierarchy where richer players gain better items, allowing them to take on stronger opponents and level up more quickly than less wealthy but more committed players.

== See also ==
- List of MUDs
- Digital currency
- List of free massively multiplayer online games
- List of massively multiplayer online role-playing games
- Private server
- Virtual economy
- Virtual goods
- Virtual world
- VRMMORPG
