= Ran Balicer =

Israeli physician, epidemiologist, and public health expert

Prof. Ran Balicer רןבליצר
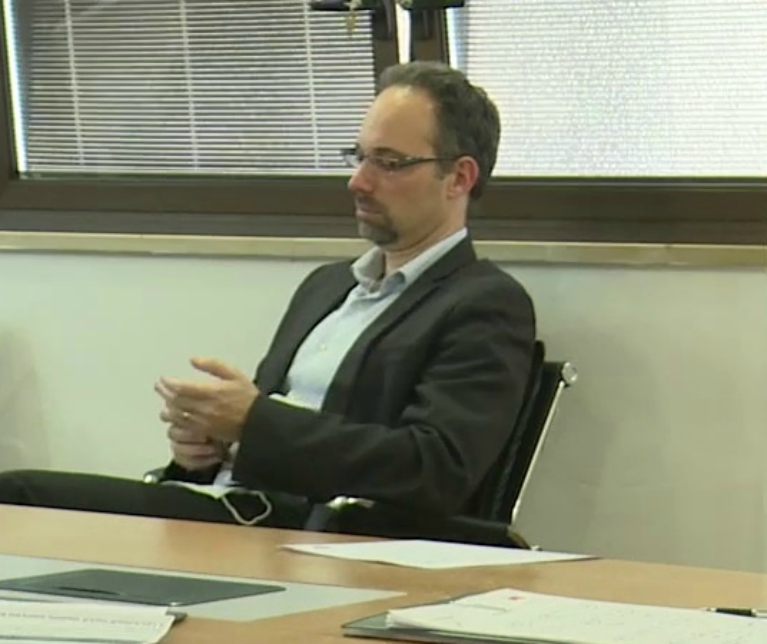
- Born: Israel
- Education: MD; MPH; PhD
- Alma mater: Tel Aviv University; Ben-Gurion University of the Negev
- Occupations: Physician; Epidemiologist; Public health
- Employer: Clalit Health Services
- Known for: Health services research; Real-world evidence; Population health
- Title: Chief Innovation Officer; Deputy Director-General

Ran Balicer (Hebrew: רןבליצר) is an Israeli physician, epidemiologist, and public health expert. He serves as a Professor of public health at the Ben-Gurion University. Balicer is Chief Innovation Officer and Deputy Director General at Clalit Health Services, the largest healthcare organization in Israel and the second largest globally. He is also the founding director of the Clalit Research Institute, a pioneer in the use of big data for proactive medicine. He chairs the Israeli Medical Association's Society for Quality in Healthcare, advocating for standardized excellence in clinical practice and also he is a senior advisor to international health agencies, including the World Health Organization (WHO) and the United Nations (UN).

== Early life and education ==
Baciler was Born and raised in Israel. He attended Tel Aviv University, where he earned his Medical Degree (MD). He studied a Master of Public Health (MPH) and a PhD in Health Systems Management at Ben-Gurion University of the Negev. His doctoral research focused on mathematical modeling of infectious diseases that focus on national preparedness strategies for influenza pandemics.

== Career ==
After completing his medical and public health training, he joined Clalit Health Services. He later assumed the role of Chief Innovation Officer, with responsibilities related to innovation initiatives, data strategy, and health system performance.

In 2010, Balicer established the Clalit Research Institute, creating a framework for conducting real-world evidence research using Clalit’s comprehensive electronic health records. The institute became internationally recognized for longitudinal studies in chronic disease, vaccine effectiveness, and health system evaluation, and was later designated a World Health Organization Collaborating Centre on Non-Communicable Diseases Research, Prevention, and Control. Balicer contributed to international collaborations aimed at adapting Israeli health-technology and population-health approaches to other national health systems.

Balicer also holds an academic appointment as a Professor of Public Health at Ben-Gurion University of the Negev. His research focuses on the application of machine learning and predictive modeling to identify individuals at elevated risk for chronic conditions prior to clinical deterioration. His findings are published in peer-reviewed medical and public health literature. He co-chairs the Ivan and Francesca Berkowitz Family Living Collaboration Laboratory at Harvard Medical School and the Clalit Research Institute, and is a Senior Fellow at the Simons Institute at UC Berkeley.

During the COVID-19 pandemic, Balicer became a figure in Israel’s public health response. Since 2020, he chaired the national expert advisory body that provided epidemiological analysis and policy recommendations to government decision-makers. His research teams published one of the world’s first large-scale, peer-reviewed datasets on the effectiveness of the Pfizer-BioNTech vaccine in Israel, a mass-vaccination setting. These studies were critical in proving vaccine efficacy and provided evidence used by global agencies like the CDC and WHO to approve booster doses.

Since 2013, Balicer has served as the chair of the Israeli Society for Quality in Healthcare and as a member of various national and international health policy committees. He participated in global advisory initiatives, providing guidance to governments and organizations on the responsible application of health data and emerging technologies. In 2023, Balicer contributed to policy work for the United Nations Secretary-General’s High-Level Advisory Board on Artificial Intelligence.

== Recognition ==
Balicer has been recognized as one of the most influential figures in Israeli society and global medicine. He was named to TheMarker’s “40 Promising Young People” in 2010 and “100 Most Influential People in Israel” in 2017. Globes selected him as one of the “40 Leading Young Managers” in 2012 and “People of the Year” in 2021 for his pandemic leadership. In 2025, he received an Honorary Professorship from Charité – Universitätsmedizin Berlin, Germany’s top medical school, for his pioneering work in AI-based personalized healthcare.
