= Raid (video games) =

Large-scale group activity in a multiplayer video game

A 24-man raid in Final Fantasy XIV

In online multiplayer video games, a raid is a type of activity in which groups of players team up to defeat a powerful superboss in an arena setting, waves of computer-controlled enemies in Player-versus-Environment (PvE) battles, or rival players in Player-versus-Player combat (PvP). Raids typically take place in instance dungeons—separate server instances isolated from the main game world.

Raiding is one of the most complex activities in games where it exists, requiring careful planning and coordination among large groups of players, typically eight or more. While some games use matchmaking to assemble raid teams, others—especially older games—rely on raiding guilds or informal methods like word of mouth and pickup groups (PUGs).

== Origin ==
The term "raid" derives from its original military meaning: a planned attack by a military group that is done suddenly and unexpectedly and is intended to destroy or damage something.

Raiding as a gameplay mechanic originated in a class of text-based MUDs known as DikuMUD, which heavily influenced the 1999 MMORPG EverQuest and helped introduce the concept to modern 3D MMORPGs.

== Mechanics ==
The combat encounters comprising a raid usually require players to coordinate with one another while performing specific roles as members of a team. The roles of tank, healer, and damage dealer are known as the "Holy Trinity" of MMORPG group composition. Other common roles include buffing, crowd control, and pulling (selectively choosing targets with which to initiate combat).

Raids feature a variety of challenges for players to overcome. These may include strict time limits, dodging area-of-effect attacks (AoEs), solving raid mechanics using visual cues or buff and debuff markers, and managing mana and ability cooldowns, among others.

One or multiple raid leaders or "shot callers" are often needed to direct the group efficiently due to the complexities of keeping many players working well together. Raiding is often done by associations of players called guilds or clans who maintain a consistent schedule and roster. These guilds may "range in size from a small handful to several hundred players". Typically, there are two types of raiding guilds: "hardcore" guilds, which follow a strict weekly schedule of intense, mandatory raiding; and "casual" guilds, which are more flexible and usually raid for fewer days per week.

== Rewards ==
Completing raids usually rewards players with a variety of valuable or exclusive in-game loot. These items are often unique gear pieces with superior stats or special abilities, providing strong incentives to participate. While some players are motivated by the social experience or the challenge, loot is widely regarded as the primary reason many engage in raiding.

Commonly, there is not enough loot to reward every player individually, so players have invented various systems, such as Dragon kill points (DKP), to distribute loot fairly. Games like World of Warcraft or Final Fantasy XIV include built-in systems that distribute loot using a random 1-to-100 die roll as well as a "need," "greed," and "pass" system. Final Fantasy XIV also rewards players with tokens, a certain number of which can be exchanged for raid gear—a system comparable to a "pity" mechanic.

== World-first races ==
Raids are often the subject of so-called "world-first" races, in which guilds, groups of players or even esports teams compete to be the first to complete a newly released raid. These races can take days to conclude and often amass thousands of viewers across various livestreaming platforms such as YouTube and Twitch. Blizzard, the developers of World of Warcraft, have been holding formal world-first tournaments since 2007. Viewership for the world-first race for Battle For Azeroth's first raid peaked at 263,000 viewers in June 2025.

== Noted raids ==
An attempted raid in the game Final Fantasy XI against the Pandemonium Warden lasted 18 hours and reportedly resulted in players "passing out and getting physically ill."

The world's first completion of the Salvation's Edge raid in Bungie's Destiny 2 took 18 hours, 59 minutes, 41 seconds, with the second completion not coming until almost five hours later. The event drew a peak of nearly 500,000 concurrent viewers on Twitch.

The winners of the world-first race for Final Fantasy XIV's "The Omega Protocol" raid were found to have cheated during their attempt, prompting a response from the game's director, Naoki Yoshida. At least one team member used a mod to extend their camera distance beyond the intended limit, providing a competitive advantage.

== See also ==
- Esports
- Instance dungeon
- Loot (video games)
- Massively multiplayer online role-playing game
- Speedrunning
