= Social interaction in MMORPGs =

Social interactions in MMORPGs take the form of in-game communication, virtual behaviors, and the development of interpersonal and group relationships. In massive multiplayer online role-playing games (MMORPGs), cooperation between players to accomplish difficult tasks is often an integral mechanic of gameplay, and organized groups of players, often called guilds, clans, or factions, emerge. Sometimes the relationships players form within the game spill over into friendships or romantic relationships in the material world. In other instances, romantic partners and groups of material world friends find that playing together strengthens their bonds.

== Avatars and communication ==
MMORPG players take on an avatar, a humanoid graphical representation of themselves, in the game. Players usually have great latitude in designing the physical appearance, gender, and race of their avatar. Players also select their role, profession or class, each of which comes with its own set of strengths and weaknesses. Games scholar Nick Yee classifies avatars into two categories, a projection or idealization of one's identity or an experiment with a new identity. The avatar, as a representation of the self, creates the first impression and is the first means of communicating with other players.

Communication between players typically takes the form of typed chat and the animated gestures and expressions of the avatar.

== Collaboration and social networking ==
A study by Nicholas Yee, titled The Psychology of Massively Multi-User Online Role-Playing Games: Motivations, Emotional Investment, Relationships and Problematic Usage, found that combat-oriented collaborations can become very complex. Typical battle scenarios involve groups of four to eight users facing sophisticated artificial intelligence. Strategies decided upon via communication via typed conversations, and individual actions, based upon their individual personalities, may risk others in the group. Unlike many real world situations, MMORPG users can choose team members and find like-minded others. While some individuals may be outcasts in the real world, they can become whomever they want in these virtual worlds, and can find other players with similar interests and personalities. In one survey, 39.4% of males and 53.3% of females felt that their MMORPG companions were comparable to or even better than their real world friends. PBS Frontline's documentary, Growing Up Online, found that humans seek not only mental and emotional connections, but also physical presence. For some, MMORPGs can provide valuable lessons that then can be applied to the outside world. However, reliance on the internet, or possible internet addiction may also lead to "physical" social isolation.

== Virtual relationships in MMORPGs ==
In a study performed by Nick Yee, 39.4% of male respondents and 53.3% of female respondents rated their MMORPG friends as comparable or better than their material world friends. There are a number of theories about why strong relationships form in virtual worlds. The players in these environments are likely to already have much in common. For example, in one study 36% of respondents work in the IT industry and 68% of respondents have experience with table-top role-playing games. In addition to sharing professional and entertainment interests, players are also likely to share common personality traits associated with these fields.

The high-stress crisis scenarios that groups encounter in combat-oriented play, paired with player's emotional investment in the environment, may build trust among the players. MMORPGs also rely on fantastic metaphors and cultural myths, including ideas of chivalric romance, that encourage idealization of persons and relationships.

The restricted nature of the communication between players may allow a sender to carefully craft their self-presentation and the receiver may inflate the relatively few pieces of communication into an idealized picture of the sender. Because avatars are capable of only a subset of human gestures and expressions miscommunication or slippages in coordination (i.e. communication that is overlapping, missed, or late) do occur.

Although perceptions of these virtual interactions are often inaccurate, the lack of cues and increased control over how a player presents themselves sometimes facilitate romantic relationships. In-game marriage ceremonies are one way that players express affection for one another. An in-game marriage may also represent a strategic alliance or other storytelling mechanism.

However, some relationships initiated in the game environment carry over to the material world. According to Nicholas Yee, 15.7% of male MMORPG players and 5.1% of female MMORPG players physically dated someone they met in an MMORPG.

== Anonymity ==
In MMORPGs, players can choose what type of character they want to play and design their appearance. One potential positive side effect of that is difficulty in stereotyping, as all players have equal ability to design themselves, regardless of their initial appearance. There is also the potential for "identity tourism". The choice to enact oneself as a light-skinned male elf, say, could allow a black female player to appropriately role-play her character in the desired fashion without being rejected by the community. Anonymity may encourage deviance from the game's objectives and the group's decisions, as most MMORPG players feel safe from repercussions in the material world.

Many players of both genders find themselves gender-switching while creating an online avatar. This allows for more freedom of expression in ways that real life cannot incorporate. Despite the gender of the player, studies show that players tend to adhere to the gender roles of their avatar's gender and even purposefully choose to be that gender because of how it changes the way they are treated. Some players express that they gender-switch because they get to experiment with looks and behaviors they would not get to in real life. Gender-switching on the Internet is not a new phenomenon and has been occurring since the early days of online interaction. Players often claim that gender-switching, despite imposed or purposeful gender-role-fulfillment, has helped to change their outlook on gameplay.

== Dangers ==
MMORPGs function as communication platforms not unlike social media. As such, the CIA expressed worries about the use of MMORPGs as a secret communications channel for terrorists. On February 15, 2008, the office of the Director of National Intelligence provided Congress with the Data Mining Report. In this report the existence of the so-called Reynard Project was disclosed. The aim of the Reynard Project is described as follows:

"Reynard is a seedling effort to study the emerging phenomenon of social (particular terrorist) dynamics in virtual worlds and large-scale online games and their implications for the Intelligence Community. The cultural and behavioral norms of virtual worlds and gaming are generally unstudied. Therefore, Reynard will seek to identify the emerging social, behavioral and cultural norms in virtual worlds and gaming environments. The project would then apply the lessons learned to determine the feasibility of automatically detecting suspicious behavior and actions in the virtual World. If it shows early promise, this small seedling effort may increase its scope to a full project."

== See also ==
- Identity tourism

== Bibliography ==
- Yee, N. (2006). "The Demographics, Motivations and Derived Experiences of Users of Massively-Multiuser Online Graphical Environments" (PDF). Presence: Teleoperators & Virtual Environments. 15 (3): 309–329. doi:10.1162/pres.15.3.309. S2CID 866346.
- The Daedalus Gateway – The Psychology of MMORPGs: Player Demographics. Site chronicles the findings of the Daedalus project, which conducted surveys of MMORPG users.
- Dretzin, R. (Director), Maggio, J. (Director). (2008). Growing up online (film). Melbourne: PBS Video.
- Shapira, N.A.; Lessig, M. C.; Goldsmith, T. D.; Szabo, S. T.; Lazoritz, M.; Gold, M. S.; Stein, D. J. (2003). "Problematic internet use: Proposed classification and diagnostic criteria". Depression and Anxiety. 17 (4): 207–216. doi:10.1002/da.10094. PMID 12820176. S2CID 13044242.
