= Bartle taxonomy of player types =

Classification of video game players

Character theory chart

The Bartle taxonomy of player types is a classification of video game players (gamers) based on a 1996 paper by Richard Bartle according to their preferred actions within the game. The classification originally described players of multiplayer online games (including MUDs and MMORPGs), though now it also refers to players of single-player video games.

The taxonomy is based on a character theory. This character theory consists of four characters: Achievers, Explorers, Socializers, and Killers (often mapped onto the four suits of the standard playing card deck; Diamonds, Spades, Hearts, and Clubs, in that order). These are imagined according to a quadrant model where the X axis represents preference for interacting with other players vs. exploring the world and the Y axis represents preference for interaction vs. unilateral action.

A test known as Bartle Test of Gamer Psychology based on Bartle's taxonomy was created in 1999–2000 by Erwin Andreasen and Brandon Downey, containing a series of questions and an accompanying scoring formula. Although the test has been met with some criticism for the dichotomous nature of its question-asking method, as of October 2011, it had been taken over 800,000 times. As of February 2018, the Bartle Test of Gamer Psychology hosted by GamerDNA is no longer available. Alternative online implementations of the test exist, however.

The result of the Bartle Test is the "Bartle Quotient", which is calculated based on the answers to a series of 30 random questions in the test, and totals 200% across all categories, with no single category exceeding 100%.

== Achievers ==
Also known as "Diamonds" (♦), these are players who prefer to gain "points", levels, equipment and other concrete measurements of succeeding in a game. They will go to great lengths to achieve rewards that are merely cosmetic.

=== Single-player appeal to the Achiever ===
Every game that can be "beaten" in some way caters to the Achiever play style by giving them something to accomplish. Games that offer a 100% completion rating appeal to Achievers.

=== Multi-player appeal to the Achiever ===
One of the appeals of online gaming to the Achiever is that they have the opportunity to show off their skill and hold elite status to others. They value (or despise) the competition from other Achievers, and look to the Socializers to give them praise. Microsoft's Xbox Live utilizes the Gamerscore to reward Achievers, who can get points by completing difficult "Achievements" in the various games they purchase. They can, in turn, compare themselves to other gamers from around the world.

== Explorers ==
Explorers, dubbed "Spades" (♠) for their tendency to dig around, are players who prefer discovering areas, and immerse themselves in the game world. They are often annoyed by time-restricted missions as that does not allow them to traverse at their own pace. They enjoy finding glitches or a hidden easter egg.

=== Single-player appeal to the Explorer ===
Combat and gaining levels or points is secondary to the Explorer, so they traditionally flock to games such as Myst. In these games, the player finds themselves in a strange place, and the objective is to find their way out by paying close attention to detail and solving puzzles. The Explorer will often enrich themselves in any backstory or lore they can find about the people and places in-game. Whereas an Achiever may quickly forget a gaming adventure; the Explorer will recall fond memories about their experience.

=== Multi-player appeal to the Explorer ===
However, Explorers will often become bored with any particular MMORPG when they have experienced its content. They will tire quicker than other gamer types, and feel the game has become a chore to play.

== Socializers ==
There are a multitude of gamers who choose to play games for the social aspect, rather than the actual game itself. These players are known as Socializers or "Hearts" (♥). They gain the most enjoyment from a game by interacting with other players, and sometimes, computer-controlled characters with personality. The game is merely a tool they use to meet others in-game or outside of it. Some socializers enjoy helping others for the sake of altruism, while explorers help for the sake of discovering previously unattained areas, and achievers or killers want to help for the sake of an extrinsic reward such as points.

=== Single-player appeal to the Socializer ===
Since their objective is not so much to win or explore as it is to be social, there are few games that the Socializer enjoy based on their merits. Instead, they play some of the more popular games so that they can use the multi-player features. However, there are some games designed with their play style in mind, which socializers may in particular enjoy. Games of the earliest video game generations seldom have longer dialogue trees, but 2000s games that offer significant player-NPC relationship interaction and development include the titles Fable, Mass Effect, and Knights of the Old Republic.

With the advent of the World Wide Web, gamers' association has partially moved online. Socializers are especially keen at sharing their gaming experiences on forums and social media. For instance, the procedurally generated game Dwarf Fortress, has a tight-knit community due to the game's unforgiving nature, unique scenarios and perplexing mechanics. Video game streamers who interact with their audience are often socializers. One former popular form of gaming video is the Let's Play format, which has largely been replaced by live streaming on platforms such as Twitch and YouTube.

=== Multi-player appeal to the Socializer ===
The online environment is very appealing to the Socializer, as it provides near limitless potential for new relationships. They take full advantage of the ability to join guilds or kinships in many online games.

== Killers ==
=== Single-player appeal to the Killer ===
Killers, well-suited as "Clubs" (♣), are, more than other player types, motivated by powergaming and eclipsing others. They want to achieve first rank on the high score board or beat another speedrunner's time record.

=== Multi-player appeal to the Killer ===
Causing mayhem among computer-controlled people and things may be fun to the Killer, but nothing amounts to the joy of pitting one's skills against an actual player-controlled opponent. For most, the joy of being a Killer results from a friendly competitive spirit.

For others, it's more about power and the ability to hurt others or the thrill of the hunt. One such example is "ganking" or "owning", a process where the Killer takes their strong character to a place where inexperienced or weaker characters reside, and proceeds to kill them repeatedly.

== Application ==
In addition to helping players define their game-playing preferences, the Bartle taxonomy has also been used by game designers to help define the requirements of games that are intended to appeal to a particular audience.

== History ==
In 2006, after running for ten years on a web server maintained by Erwin Andreasen, the database met with intractable scalability problems. After several months, the test was rewritten and moved to GamerDNA servers, preserving all the original test data.

== Expanded categories ==
Richard Bartle also created a version of his player types model that included a third axis of implicit/explicit, leading to eight player types.

Achievers

- Planner (explicit): They set a goal and aim to achieve it.
- Opportunist (implicit): They look around for things to do, but they don't know what these are until they find them.

Explorers

- Scientist (explicit): They are methodical in their acquisition of knowledge.
- Hacker (implicit): They have an intuitive understanding of the virtual world, with no need to test their ideas.

Socializers

- Networker (explicit): They assess other player's capabilities.
- Friend (implicit): They enjoy their company.

Killers

- Politician (explicit): Their aim is to get a big, good reputation.
- Griefer (implicit): Their vague aim is to get a big, bad reputation.

According to Bartle: "The 4-part version is easy to draw because it's 2D, but the 8-part one is 3D; it's therefore much harder to draw in such a way as it doesn't collapse in a mass of lines." There is one known online test based on this model.

== Criticism ==
Bartle's divisions provide a foundation for investigating gamer psychology; however, subsequent studies have noted certain limitations. For example, Nick Yee has argued that a "component" framework provides more explanatory power than a "category" framework. Bartle's motivation factors were analysed for correlation by factorial analysis based on a sample of 7,000 MMO players. One of the results was that the Bartle's Explorer type didn't appear and more importantly its subfactors "exploring the world" and "analysing the game mechanics" didn't correlate. Jon Radoff has proposed a new four-quadrant model of player motivations (immersion, cooperation, achievement, and competition) that has a goal of combining simplicity along with the major motivational elements that apply to all games (multiplayer or otherwise).

== See also ==
- 4X
- Gamification
- GNS theory
