= Designing Virtual Worlds =

2003 book by Richard Bartle

- Author: Richard Bartle
- Language: English
- Genre: Non-fiction
- Publisher: New Riders
- Publication date: 2003
- Publication place: United States
- Media type: Print (Paperback)
- Pages: 741
- ISBN: 0-13-101816-7

Designing Virtual Worlds is a book about the practice of virtual world development by Richard Bartle. It has been noted as an authoritative source regarding the history of world-based online games. College courses have been taught using it.

In 2021, the author made the book freely available under a Creative Commons license on his website.

== Contents ==
Designing Virtual Worlds argues that the fundamentals of player relationships to the virtual world and each other are independent of technical issues and are characterized by a blending of online and offline identity. According to the book, it is the designer's role to know what will provide players with a positive game experience, the purpose of virtual worlds is the player's exploration of self, as well as for its expansion of the earlier 4-type Bartle gamer style taxonomy into an 8-type model. The book also focuses on the practicalities of its subject.

== Reception ==
It has been called "the bible of MMORPG design" and spoken of as "excellent", "seminal", "widely read", "the standard text on the subject", "the most comprehensive guide to gaming virtual worlds" and "a foundation text for researchers and developers of virtual worlds" that is "strongly recommended for anyone actually thinking about building one of these places" and "describes the minimum level of competency you should have when discussing design issues for virtual worlds".

A more critical view from Dave Rickey of Skotos.net called it a "must-read" work, but that he found "much that was questionable, incomplete, or just erroneous".
