= One Chance (video game) =

2010 video game

- It shows the gameplay without a title screen, indicates the second day depicts the beginning of the extinction.
- Developer: Dean Moynihan
- Publisher: Dean Moynihan
- Platforms: Browser, Flash
- Release: December 2, 2010
- Genre: Puzzle
- Mode: Single-player

One Chance is an apocalyptic Flash game developed by Dean Moynihan and released on Newgrounds on December 2, 2010. It has been frequently cited in video games literature as an interesting and moving use of permadeath mechanic (permanent death).

In the game, the player controls a scientist who has created a cancer-attacking "cure"; when it is released in a gas form it begins to cause the extinction of all life by unexpectedly targeting all living cells, rather than just cancer cells. The player is left six days with the choice to spend the last days on Earth with their family, or create an antidote, after which point one of several endings may be achieved depending on the choices made. A web browser cookie prevents the game from being played more than once.

== Gameplay ==
WhatGamesAre describes the gameplay as that of "a simple adventure game where you can walk around, talk to people and open doors. Every day the game changes the scenario up a little bit and reinforces the message of how much time is left. In the end... the results are stark and affecting." There are multiple endings, and some reviewers asked readers to share their own personal experiences on how they chose to spend their last 6 days on Earth before the ceasing of all life.

The game's name refers to the player's inability to replay it upon completion; refreshing the page after finishing the game brings the player back to the ending received. However, this can be circumvented by playing the game on a different website, using a different computer, or clearing the web browser's cookies; Moynihan discourages these workarounds, and feels that they detract from the game's impact.

== Plot ==
Players assume the role of Dr. John Pilgrim, who has a wife named Penny and a daughter named Molly. Pilgrim is part of a small group of scientists who have discovered what seems to be the cure for cancer, named E48K15. They soon realize that the experimental cure doesn't just kill cancer cells, but all living cells as well. The bioweapon had already been released into the air before this fact was found out, and John is left with 6 days and a hard choice to either spend time the last days on Earth with his family as the apocalypse develops or to spend time at work at his family’s expense in order to develop the cure for the bioweapon and save all life on Earth.

== Reception ==
WhatGamesAre praised the unpredictability of the game, saying, "At several points the game then surprises you. You think you have it figured out, and then something changes and it sneaks past your defences. You might feel appalled or just freaked out that this little Flash game is somehow getting to you, and you may well feel conscientious and even guilty about the situation that the game places you in." It added that "The biggest flaw with One Chance is that it is only good for one play through...The other game-side flaw is that there is no sense of a solution." Alternatively, Destructoid spoke positively of inability to replay, stating, "There's a problem with branching paths and moral decisions in videogames: even if they are meaningful (few are), players can usually bypass the system by using multiple save files or other means to go in for another attempt and a different outcome", adding that the game had a very good system to prevent people from "cheating".

== See also ==
- You Only Live Once (2009)
