= Richard Bartle =

British writer, professor and game researcher

Richard Bartle FBCS FRSA
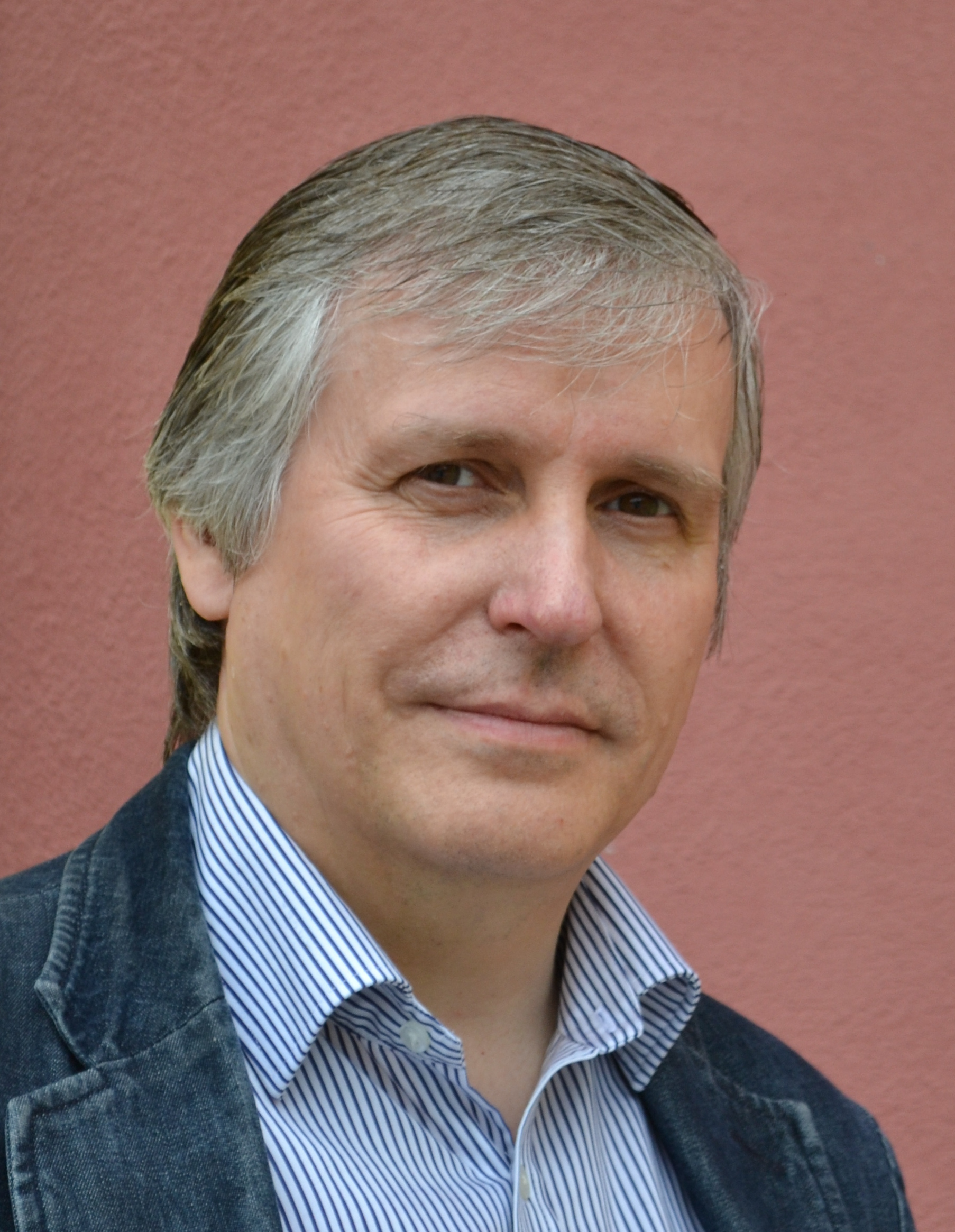
- Bartle in 2011
- Born: 10 January 1960 (age 66); Ripon, England
- Occupations: writer, professor, game researcher
- Known for: MUD1; Designing Virtual Worlds
- Spouse: Gail Bartle
- Children: Jennifer Bartle, Madeleine Bartle
- Website: http://mud.co.uk/richard/

Richard Allan Bartle (born 10 January 1960) is a British writer, professor and game researcher in the massively multiplayer online game industry. He co-created MUD1 (the first MUD) in 1978, and is the author of the 2003 book Designing Virtual Worlds.

== Life and career ==
In 1988, Bartle received a PhD in artificial intelligence from the University of Essex, where as an undergraduate, he created MUD1 with Roy Trubshaw in 1978.

He lectured at Essex until 1987, when he left to work full-time on MUD (known as MUD2 in its present version). Several years later he returned to the university as a part-time professor and principal teaching fellow in the Department of Computing and Electronic Systems, supervising courses on computer game design as part of the department's degree course on computer game development. He retired from teaching at the end of April 2025 and is now Emeritus Professor.

He is a Fellow of the Royal Society of Arts.

In 2003, he wrote Designing Virtual Worlds, a book about the history, ethics, structure, and technology of massively multiplayer games.

Bartle is also a contributing editor to Terra Nova, a collaborative blog that deals with virtual world issues.

Bartle did research on player types of enjoyments in MUDs. In Bartle's analysis, MUD players can be divided into four archetypes: achievers, explorers, socializers and killers. This idea has been adapted into an online test generally referred to as the Bartle Test, which is quite popular, with scores often exchanged on massively multiplayer online games forums and networking sites.

=== Personal life ===
About 2003, Bartle was reported as living in a village near Colchester, England, with his wife Gail and their two children Jennifer and Madeleine. Bartle is an atheist and a patron of Humanists UK.

== Awards ==
- International Game Developers Association "First Penguin Award" (now called "The Pioneer Award"), at the 2005 Game Developers Choice Awards, for his part in creating the first MUD.
- Game Developers Choice Online "The Online Game Legend Award", at the 2010 Game Developers Choice Awards

== Works ==
=== Games ===
- Spellbinder, 1977, a paper-and-pencil game also known as Waving Hands, first described in Bartle's fanzine Sauce of the Nile
- MUD1, 1978, with Roy Trubshaw
- MUD2, 1980, based on MUD1
- Spunky Princess, 2015, based on wap

==== Spellbinder ====
Spellbinder (also known as Waving Hands) is a simultaneous 1977 paper-and-pencil game by Bartle and first published in his fanzine, Sauce of the Nile. It has since been re-created in a variety of formats, including software for the X Window System, play-by-email, Java applet, Android application, and web-based.

Two or more players take the role of wizards, and the object of the game is to be the last wizard standing. Wizards can cast spells at other wizards, themselves, or summoned monsters. These spells are cast through gestures: each turn, the player chooses two gestures, one for each hand, from clap (C), wave (W), snap (S), wriggle fingers (F), proffered palm (P) and digit point (D). There are also the non-magical gestures stab (>) and nothing (-). Turns are resolved simultaneously once all wizards have submitted their gestures for a given turn. These gestures are built up via many turns to form spells. For instance, one can cast the spell "Magic Missile" by performing the S (snap) gesture followed by the D (digit point) with the same hand on a consecutive turn. This is usually denoted as 'SD'. The spell is cast on the turn that the D is made, assuming no intervention (such as a Counter Spell). Play centers around the strategy of tracking what spells are being cast on all four (or more) hands, thus ensuring your spells achieve their desired effect while attempting to mitigate those of your opponent. The game is one of pure strategy; outside of the "Confusion" spell which causes a random gesture to be made all spell effects can be anticipated deterministically, making it akin to Chess or Go. Through a few minor variants to the rules, all random chance and other imbalances can be removed.

While there are many aspects to Spellbinder strategy, bluffing is a key element to all game play, often referred to as "Shadow Casting". In this common practice, warlocks play a set of gestures, which form the beginning of a spell, without ever completing it. When this happens opponents are left with the choice to either defend against a spell which may not be cast at all, or risk not defending against it. For example, 'PSD' forms the beginning of a 'Charm Person' spell 'PSDF', but one may also continue this set to a '..DPP' which forms an 'Amnesia', without ever completing the Charm. Much like in Chess, the resolution of the game opening plays an important part in the later development of the game.

Common openings such as 'D/P', 'S/P', 'S/W' have been studied in depth.

=== Books ===
- Artificial Intelligence and Computer Games, Paperback, 256 pages, Century Communications, 25 July 1985, ISBN 978-0-7126-0661-5.
- Designing Virtual Worlds, Paperback, 768 pages, New Riders Pub., 25 July 2003 ISBN 978-0-13-101816-7.
- IN^{sight}_{flames}, 1999, Online publication. Also 2 Paperbacks, NotByUs, "IN Sight", 422 pages, July 2007, ISBN 978-0-9556494-0-0 & "IN Flames", 416 pages, August 2007, ISBN 978-0-9556494-1-7. Science fiction.
- Lizzie Lott's Sovereign, NotByUs, June 2011, ISBN 978-0955649448. First in a series of young adult fiction.
- MMOs from the Outside In: The Massively-Multiplayer Online Role-Playing Games of Psychology, Law, Government, and Real Life, Apress, December 2015, ISBN 978-1484217801.
- MMOs from the Inside Out: The History, Design, Fun, and Art of Massively-multiplayer Online Role-playing Games, Apress, December 2015, ISBN 978-1484217238.
- How to Be a God: A Guide for Would-Be Deities, 555 pages, NotByUs, 2022, ISBN 978-0-9556494-9-3.
- Dheghōm, 284 pages, NotByUs, 2023, ISBN 978-1-915964-00-7. First in a series of virtual world science fiction.
- Designing Virtual Worlds 2nd Edition, Volume I, 555 pages, CRC Press, 8 August 2025, ISBN 978-1-0411742-7-1.

== Further reading for Spellbinder ==
- Spellbinder history including links to playing online.
- Rules as written by Andrew Buchanan.
- Spellbinder Combo Assistant (250Kb) a freeware program written in Delphi that help to calculate the best spell combinations for next turns. It contains a spell list and descriptions in English, Spanish and Italian. (Screenshot).
- Warlocks a fully developed free-to-play web interpretation by Raven Black. Includes ladder, melee (3+ player duels) and Elo ranking system, challenge board, and optional rule variants.
- Warlocks for Android Android application to access to games.ravenblack.net site
- The Refuge Forum a forum for discussions of game strategy and tactics
- Facebook Community Spellbinder Facebook Community
