= Retro gaming =

Cultural activity with old video games

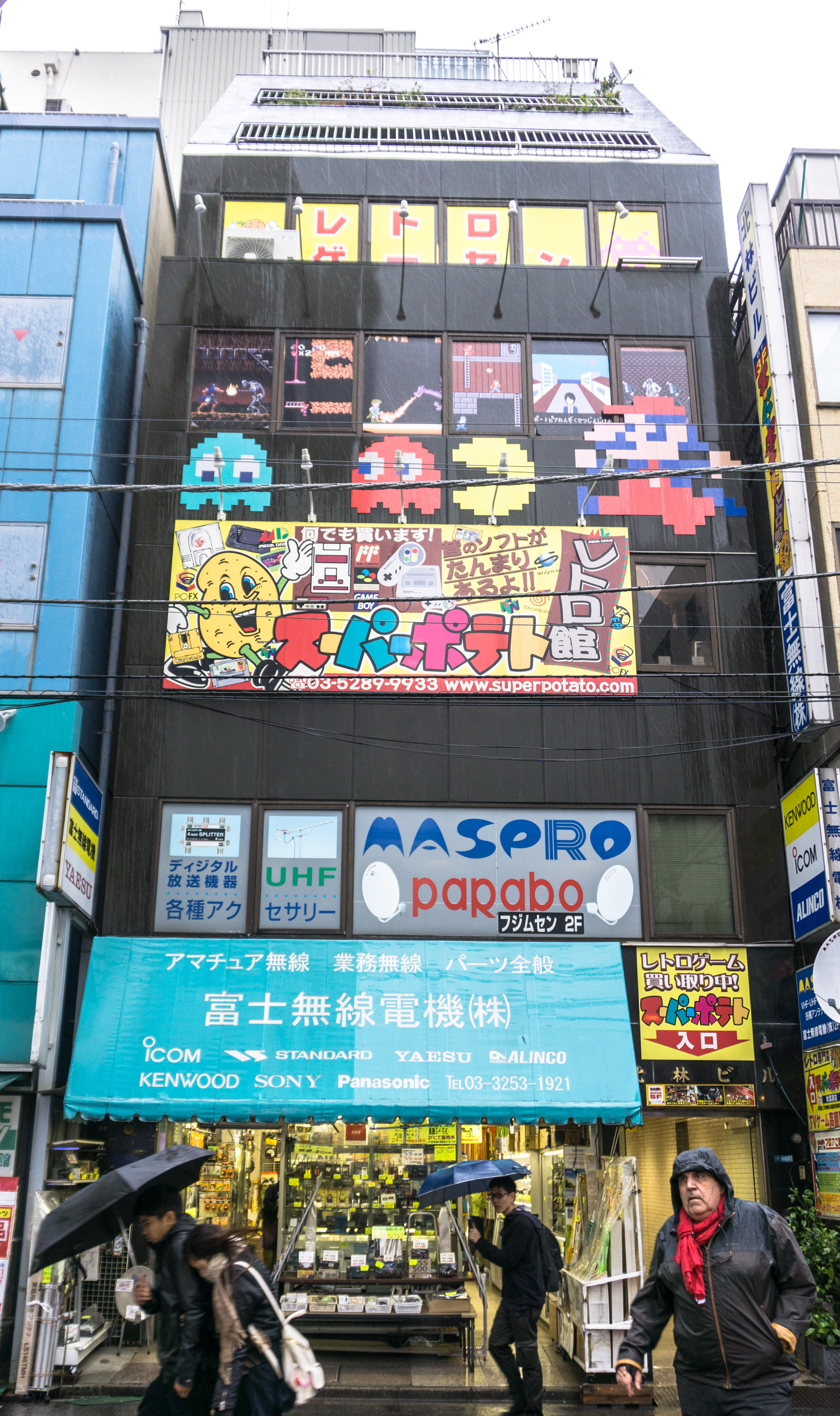
Super Potato, a retro game store in Akihabara, Tokyo

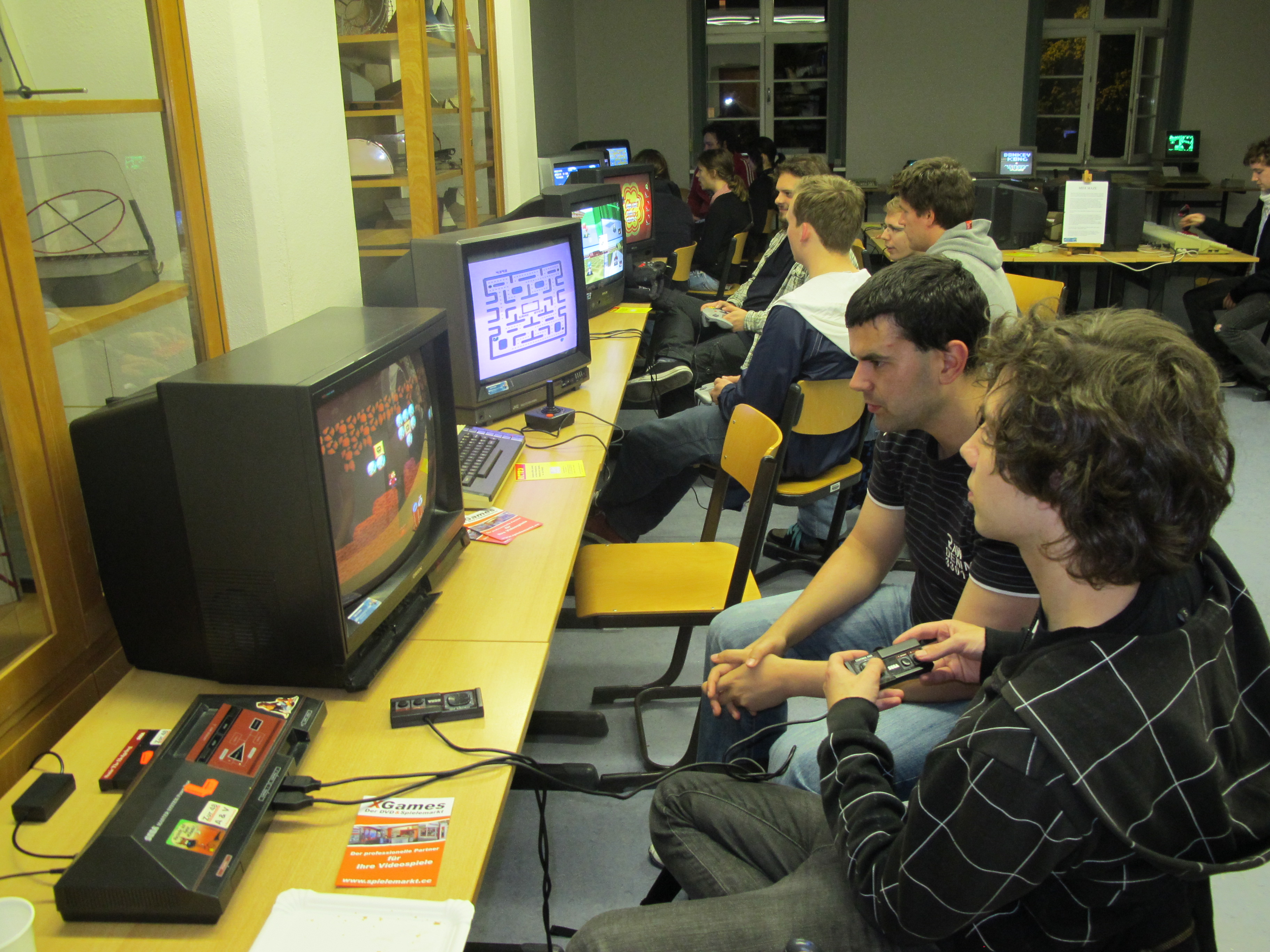
Gameplay of Alex Kidd in Miracle World on a Master System, and others in the background, in 2012

Retro gaming, also known as classic gaming and old school gaming, is the playing and collection of personal computers, consoles, and video games from earlier decades. Usually, retro gaming is based upon systems that are outmoded or discontinued, although ported retro gaming allows games to be played on modern hardware via ports, emulations or compilations. It is typically for nostalgia, preservation, or authenticity. A new game could be retro styled, such as an RPG with turn-based combat and pixel art in isometric camera perspective, as well as chip-tune styled music.

Retro gaming has existed since the early years of the video game industry, and was popularized with the Internet and emulation technology. It is argued that the main reasons players are drawn to retro games are nostalgia for different eras, the idea that older games are more innovative and original, and the simplicity of the games.

Retro gaming and retrocomputing have been described as preservation activity and as aspects of the remix culture.

== Games ==
The distinction between retro and modern is heavily debated, but it usually coincides with either the shift from 2D to 3D games (making the fourth the last retro generation, and the fifth the first modern), the turn of the millennium and the increase in online gaming (making the fifth the last retro generation, and the sixth the first modern), or the switch from analog to digital for audiovisual output and from 4:3 to 16:9 aspect ratio (making the sixth the last retro generation, and the seventh the first modern). They can be played on original hardware or in modern emulation. The retro game focused television program GameCenter CX determines that a console has to be 20 years or older to be included in the retro game challenges.

== History ==
In the early to mid-1990s, a fanbase for older video games grew through self-published fanzines such as Tim Duarte's 2600 Connection, Joe Santulli's Digital Press and Frank Polosky's Video Magic. In 1997, Ralph Barbagallo of Digital Diner magazine stated that the contemporary interest of older video games grew with the emergence of the internet through Usenet discussion groups like rec.games.video.classic and its own dedicated IRC channel. Several regulars from these discussion groups began developing their own personal web pages, such as popular sites like Greg Chance's The History of Home Video Games Homepage.

Prior to the mid 1990s, older video games would occasionally be re-released for a few consoles with Barbagallos summarizing that "for a while it seemed the game industry had no memory of the years before 1985." In 1995, Next Generation highlighted the revival of long dormant video game franchises. This included Activision releasing Return to Zork (1993) and Pitfall: The Mayan Adventure (1994), Atari with Tempest 2000 (1994), and Nintendo with Donkey Kong, with Donkey Kong Country (1994) and Donkey Kong (1994).

Following the new interest of these games, companies began re-releasing their back catalog in video game compilations commercially, such as Microsoft Arcade (1993) for Windows, and the 1995 releases of the first games in the Atari 2600 Action Pack series for home computers and the Namco Museum series for the PlayStation.

Fans also began developing releases independently, such as Stella Gets a New Brain, a re-release on compact disc of cassette tape-based games for the Atari 2600. New games also began appearing for the Atari 2600, such as the 1995 release of Ed Federmeyer's rendition of Tetris titled EdTris 2600. Barbagallo stated that Video game emulators became increasingly popular as personal computers were now fast enough to simulate hardware from consoles such as the ColecoVision, Nintendo Entertainment System, and the Game Boy as well as computers such as the MSX and Commodore 64.

== Retro gaming methods ==
With increasing nostalgia and success of retro compilations in the fifth, sixth, and seventh generations of consoles, retro gaming has become a motif in modern games. Modern retro games impose limitations on color palette, resolution, and memory well below the actual limits of the hardware, to mimic the look of old hardware. These may be based on a general concept of retro, as with Cave Story, or an attempt to imitate a specific piece of hardware, as with the MSX color palette of La Mulana.

This concept, known as deliberate retro and NosCon, gained popularity due part to the independent gaming scene, where the short development time was attractive and commercial viability was not a concern. Major publishers have embraced modern retro gaming with releases such as Mega Man 9 which mimics NES hardware; Retro Game Challenge, a compilation of new games on faux-NES hardware; and Sega's Fantasy Zone II remake, which uses emulated System 16 hardware running on PlayStation 2 to create a 16-bit reimagining of the 8-bit original (an actual arcade release of the game was also made in limited quantities as well).

=== Vintage retro gaming ===
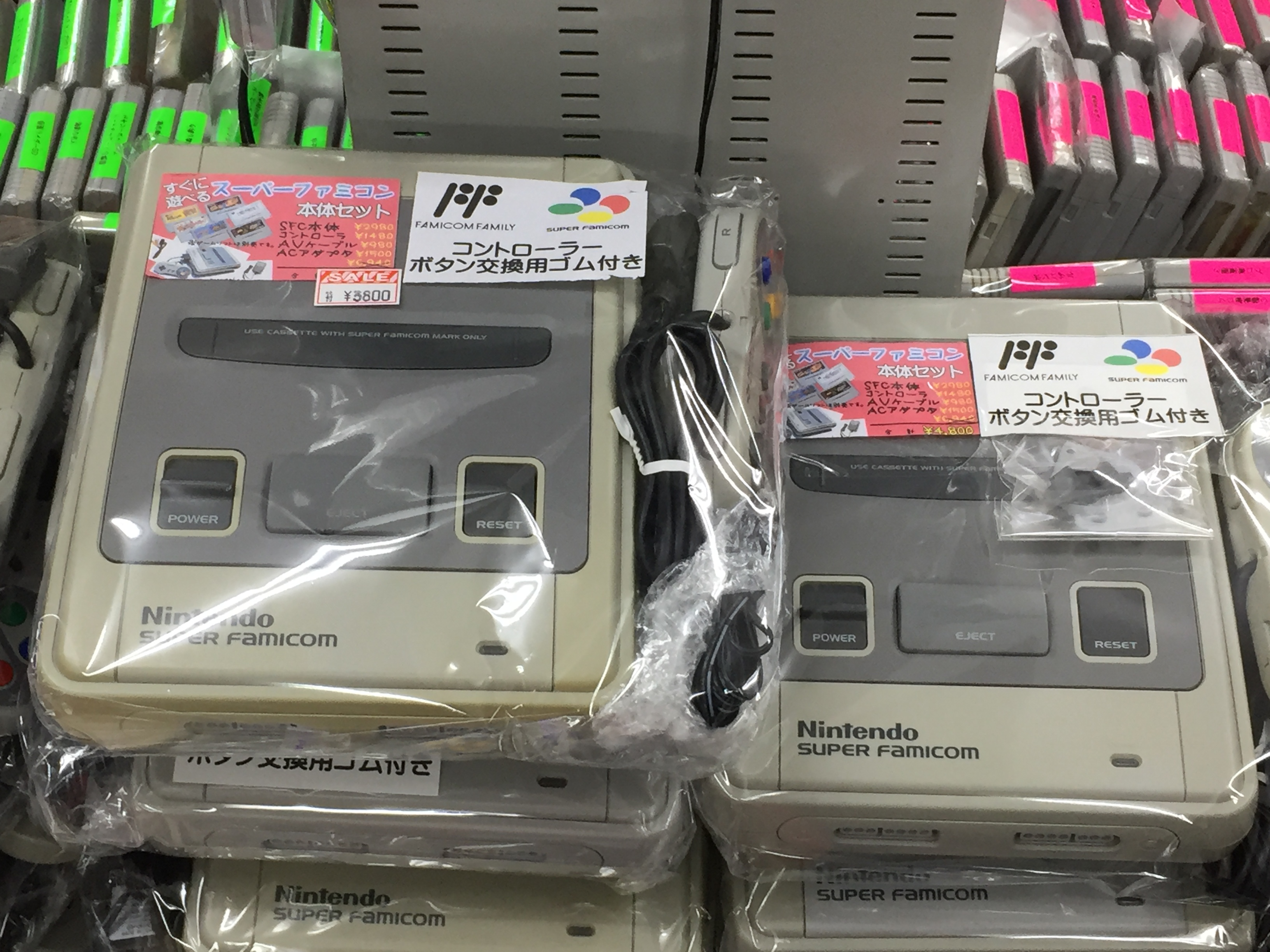
Used Super Famicom consoles and games are sold in like new condition in Akihabara. Used games are sold with or without packaging.

Vintage retro gaming can involve collecting original cartridge and disc media and arcade and console hardware, which can be expensive and rare. Most are priced lower than their original retail prices. The popularity of vintage retro gaming has led to counterfeit media, which generally lack collectible value.

During the COVID-19 pandemic, prices for vintage hardware began to spike as the millennial generation pursued the hobby during lockdowns due to boredom as well as nostalgia.

=== Retro game emulation ===
Retro gaming may involve older game systems being emulated on modern hardware. It bypasses the need to collect older consoles and original games. Read-only memory (ROM) files are copied by third parties, directly from the original media. They are then typically put online through file sharing sites. They are often sold as re-releases, typically in compilations containing multiple games running on emulation software. The accessibility of emulation popularized and expanded on retro gaming.

=== Ported retro gaming ===
Ported retro gaming involves original games being converted to native on new systems, just as in emulation but without original ROM files. Ported games are available through official collections, console-based downloads, and plug and play systems. Ported retro gaming is comparatively rare, since emulation is a much easier and more accurate method.

==== Remakes ====
Modern retro gaming may be more broadly applied to retro-style designs and reimaginings with more modern graphics. These enhanced remakes include Pac-Man: Championship Edition, Space Invaders Extreme, Super Mega Worm, and 3D Dot Game Heroes. Some are based directly upon the enhanced emulation of original games, as with Nintendo's NES Remix.

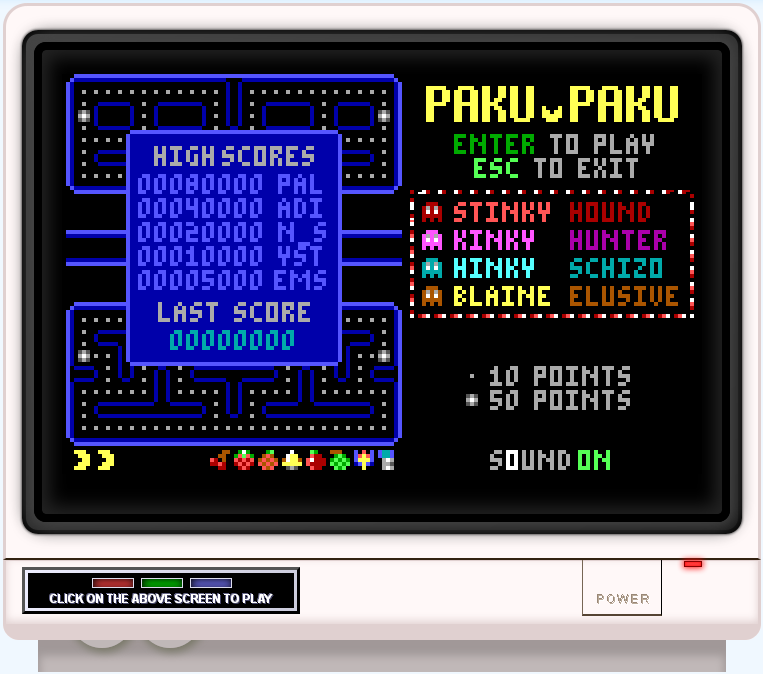
Paku Paku is a Pac-Man remake that targets the obscure 160×100×16 mode of the CGA graphic card.

When remakes are created by an individual or a group of enthusiasts without commercial motivation, such games sometimes are also called fangames. These are often motivated by the phenomenon of abandonware, which is the discontinuation of sales and support by the original producers. Examples of fan-made remakes are King's Quest I: Quest for the Crown, King's Quest II: Romancing the Stones, and Freeciv.

The nostalgia-based revival of past game styles has also been accompanied by the development of the modern chiptune genre of game music. Chiptunes are characterized by severe limitations of sound imposed by the author's self-restriction to using only the original sound chips from 8-bit or 16-bit games. These compositions are featured in many retro-style modern games and are popular in the demoscene.

==== Re-releases ====
With the new possibility of online distribution in the mid-2000s, the commercial distribution of older games became feasible, as deployment and storage costs dropped significantly:

... we can put something up on Steam, deliver it to people all around the world, make changes. We can take more interesting risks ... Retail doesn't know how to deal with those games. On Steam there's no shelf-space restriction. It's great because they're a bunch of old, orphaned games.

— Gabe Newell, Rock, Paper, Shotgun

A digital distributor specialized in bringing older games out of abandonware is GOG.com (formerly called Good Old Games) who started in 2008 to search for copyright holders of older games to re-release them legally and DRM-free. Other companies have also been established to rerelease retro games, including Limited Run Games and iam8bit.

Online platforms for older video game re-releases include Nintendo's Virtual Console and Nintendo Classics, and Sony's PlayStation Network.

Mobile application developers have been purchasing the rights and licensing to re-release older arcade games on iOS and Android operating systems. Some publishers are creating spinoffs to their older games, keeping the core gameplay while adding new features, levels, and styles of play.

==== Plug-and-play systems ====
Plug-and-play systems have been released or licensed by companies such as Atari, Sega, and Nintendo. These systems include stand-alone game libraries and plug directly into the user's television.

== Retro gaming community ==
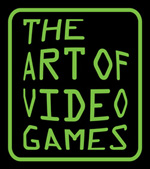
The Art of Video Games premiered at the Smithsonian American Art Museum in 2012.

The retro gaming market is active with online and physical spaces where retro games are discussed, collected, and played.

=== Online ===
Several websites and online forums are devoted to retro gaming. The content on these online platforms typically includes reviews of older games, interviews with developers, fan-made content, game walkthroughs, and message boards for discussions. Many gameplay videos posted online feature attempts at breaking speedrun or high score records.

Some YouTube channels dedicated to retro gaming have gained a considerable following, such as the Angry Video Game Nerd and Game Sack.

=== Fighting games ===
The competitive Fighting game community comes from arcades, such as Street Fighter and Mortal Kombat. Some fighting games have continued to receive arcade releases after the end of the arcade era. Face-to-face competition of Super Street Fighter II Turbo has been featured in the Evolution Championship Series.

=== Exhibitions ===
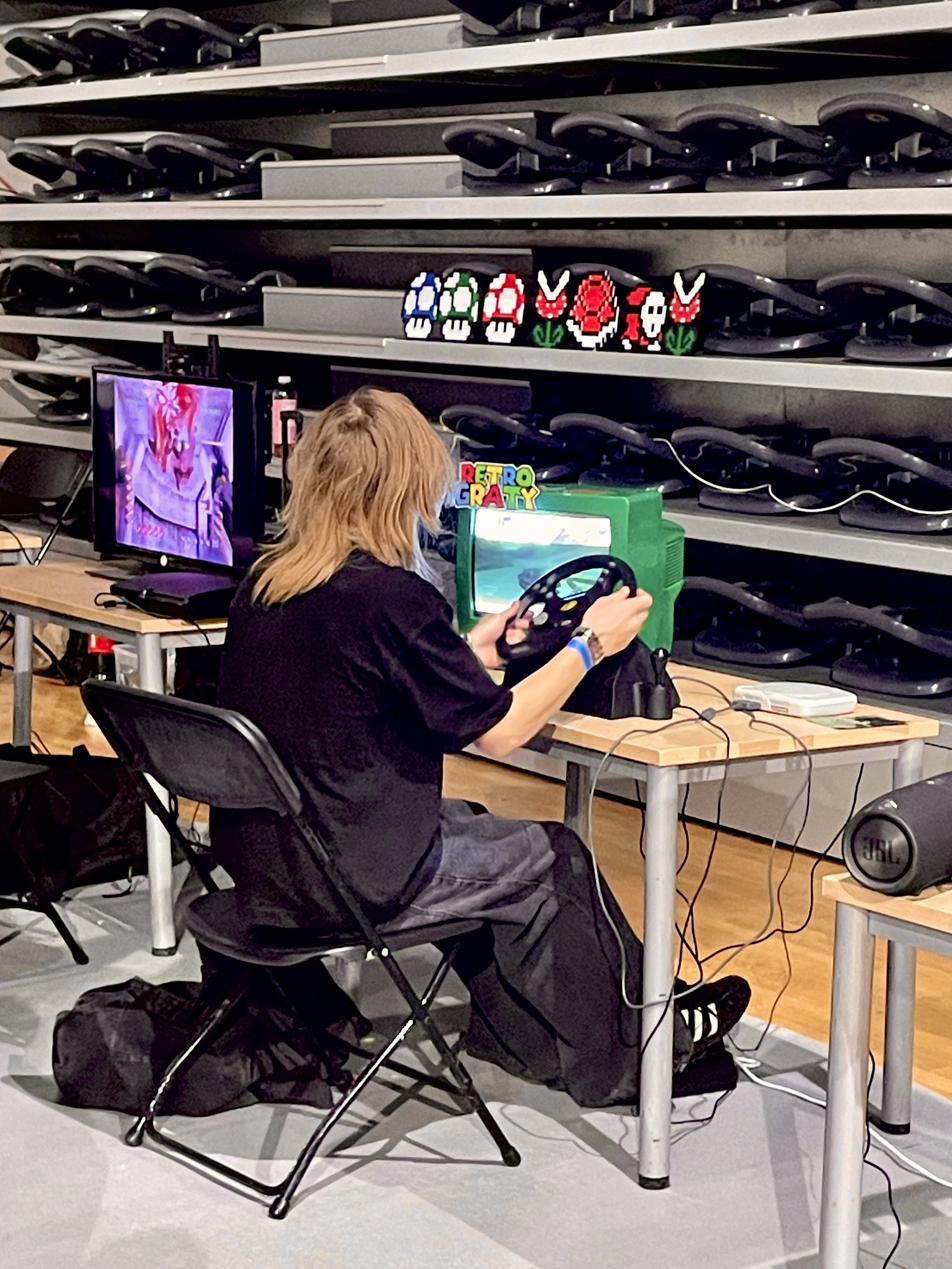
A visitor plays a retro racing game at the retrogaming zone of the 36. International Festival of Comics and Games, 2025

Events typically include vendors, gameplay, tournaments, costumes, and live music. The Classic Tetris World Championship has been streamed online to millions of views and recaps have been broadcast on ESPN2. The International Festival of Comics and Games in Poland annually features a large retro gaming area open to all visitors. Since 2016, the Retro World Series has hosted over 500 retro gaming tournaments at conventions and events across the United States.

=== Museums ===
Retro gaming is recognized by museums worldwide. For example, the RetroGames arcade museum of Karlsruhe, Germany was founded in 2002 and the Computerspielemuseum Berlin was founded in 1997. Some classical art museums bear a video gaming retrospective, as with 2012's Smithsonian American Art Museum exhibition titled The Art of Video Games or as part of the Museum of Modern Art "Applied Design" exhibition in 2013. Starting in 2015, The Strong National Museum of Play adds games annually to the World Video Game Hall of Fame. In 2016, the first museum dedicated solely to the history of the videogame industry, The National Videogame Museum, was opened in Frisco, Texas.

== Legal issues ==
An exemption in the United States' Digital Millennium Copyright Act allows consumers to modify video games they already own to make them playable. However, the duration of copyright on creative works in most countries is far longer than the era of home computing, leading to criticism that software piracy is the only way to preserve some titles. In some cases, such as No One Lives Forever, the rights remain ambiguous, preventing legal distribution.

Emulators are typically created by third parties, and the software they run is often taken directly from the original games and put online for free download. While it is completely legal for anyone to create an emulator for any hardware, unauthorized distribution of the code for a retro game is an infringement of the game's copyright. Some companies have made public statements, such as Nintendo, stating that "the introduction of emulators created to play illegally copied Nintendo software represents the greatest threat to date in the intellectual property rights of video game developers". However, video game developers and publishers typically ignore emulation. One reason for this is that at any given time, most of the games illegally distributed for emulation are not presently being sold by the company which owns the game, and so the financial damages in a successful lawsuit would likely be negligible.

=== Copyright infringement cases ===
==== Nintendo of America Inc. v. Tropic Haze LLC, No. ====
Nintendo filed a lawsuit in 2024 against Tropic Haze, claiming Yuzu, Tropic Haze's emulator, infringed copyright by reverse engineering Nintendo's hardware. The settlement that was reached included Tropic Haze paying $2.4 million and halting their emulator projects.

==== Nintendo of America Incorporated v. Mathias Designs LLC. ====
Nintendo sued the owner of LoveROMs.com and LoveRETRO.co in 2018 for hosting copyrighted game files and facilitating piracy. The court awarded Nintendo $12,230,000 in damages, leading to the shutdown of the sites.

==== Sony Computer Entertainment Inc. v. Connectix Corp. ====
In 1999, Sony sued Connectix, and the court issued a preliminary injunction against Connectix for copyright infringement on their Virtual Game Station, an emulator enabling PC users to play PlayStation games, violating Sony's BIOS copyright. The Ninth Circuit Court reversed the district court's decision both on the copyright infringement and the trademark tarnishing claims, lifting the injunction against Connectix. Video game emulation advocates have asserted that Sony vs. Connectix established the legality of emulators within the United States.

==== Sega Enterprises Ltd. v. Accolade, Inc. ====
Sega Enterprises sued Accolade in 1992 for reverse engineering Sega's technology to develop compatible games for the Sega Genesis console. The court sided with Accolade, supporting certain reverse engineering efforts for compatibility.

==== Lewis Galoob Toys, Inc. v. Nintendo of America, Inc. ====
In 1992, Lewis Galoob Toys was sued by Nintendo over the Game Genie, a device allowing game modifications for personal use. The 9th District Court of Appeals ruled in favor of Lewis Galoob Toys, stating such modifications did not infringe copyright, permitting the continued sale of the Game Genie.

== See also ==
- Video game collecting
- List of retro style video game consoles
- History of arcade video games
- History of mobile games
- History of video game consoles
- Halcyon Days: Interviews with Classic Computer and Video Game Programmers
- MAME, multi-system emulator
- Old School Revival
- Retrocomputing
- Fantasy video game console
