= History of arcade video games =

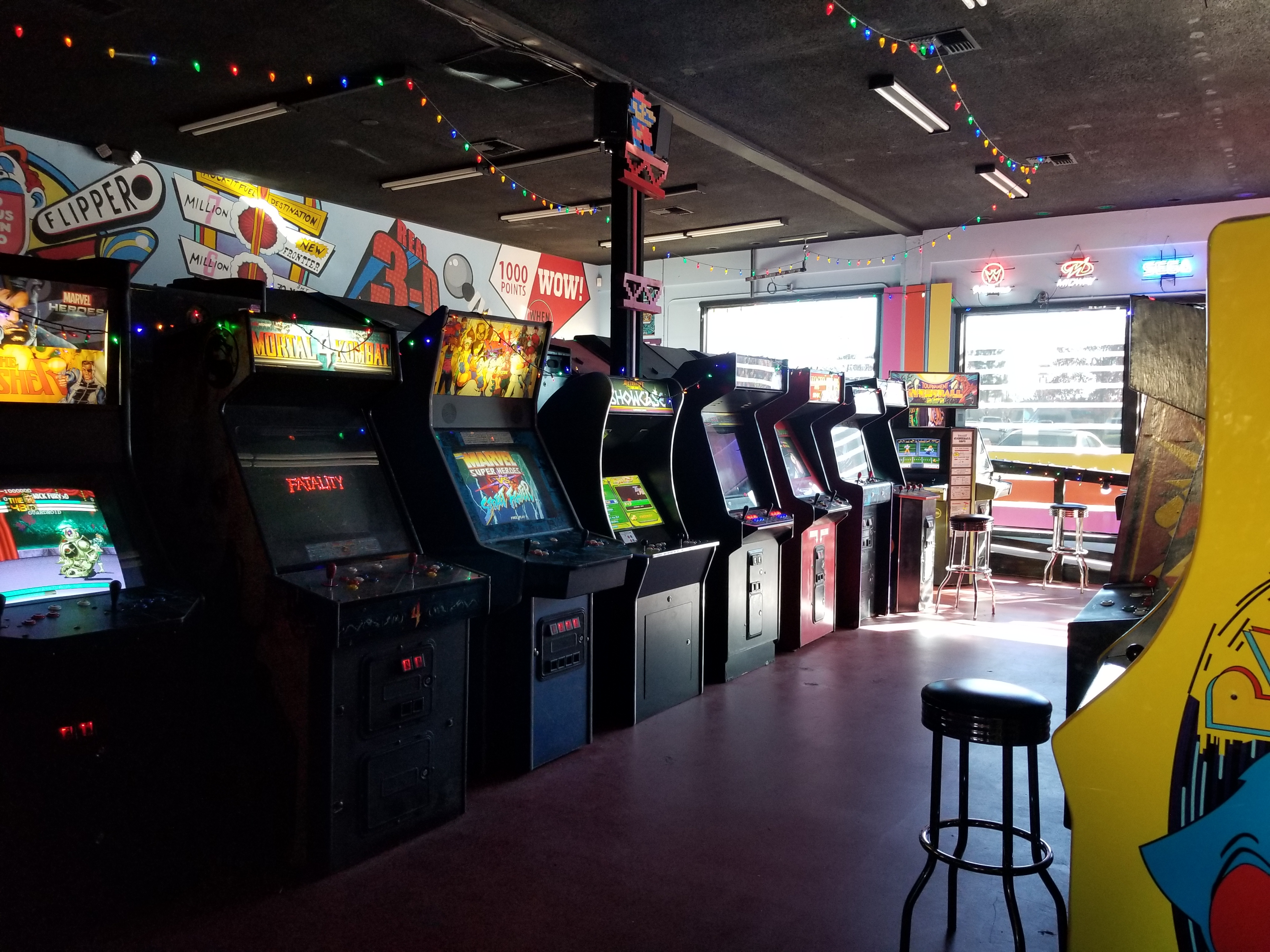
A video game arcade in 2017 featuring a number of arcade games

An arcade video game is an arcade game where the player's inputs from the game's controllers are processed through electronic or computerized components and displayed to a video device, typically a monitor, all contained within an enclosed arcade cabinet. Arcade video games are often installed alongside other arcade games such as pinball and redemption games at amusement arcades. Up until the late 1990s, arcade video games were the largest and most technologically advanced sector of the video game industry.

The first arcade game, Computer Space, was created by Nolan Bushnell and Ted Dabney, the founders of Atari, Inc., and released in 1971; the company followed on its success the next year with Pong. The industry grew modestly until the release of Taito's Space Invaders in 1978 and Namco's Pac-Man in 1980, creating a golden age of arcade video games that lasted through about 1983. At this point, saturation of the market with arcade games led to a rapid decline in both the arcade game market and arcades to support them.

The arcade market began recovering in the mid-1980s, with the help of software conversion kits, new genres such as beat 'em ups, and advanced motion simulator cabinets. There was a resurgence in the early 1990s, with the birth of the fighting game genre with Capcom's Street Fighter II in 1991 and the emergence of 3D graphics, before arcades began declining in the West during the late 1990s. After several traditional companies closed or migrated to other fields (especially in the West), arcades lost much of their relevance in the West, but have continued to remained popular in Eastern and Southeastern Asia.

== Early arcade games ==
Since the early 20th century, skee ball and other pin-based games had been a popular arcade game. The first pinball machines had been introduced in the 1930s but gained a reputation as games of chance and had been banned from many venues from the 1940s through the 1960s. Instead, newer coin-operated electro-mechanical games (EM games), classified as games of skill took their place in amusement arcades by the 1960s.

Following the arrival of Sega's EM game Periscope (1966), the arcade industry was experiencing a "technological renaissance" driven by "audio-visual" EM novelty games, establishing the arcades as a healthy environment for the introduction of commercial video games in the early 1970s. In the late 1960s, a college student Nolan Bushnell had a part-time job at an arcade where he became familiar with EM games through watching customers play and helping to maintain the machinery, while learning how it worked and developing his understanding of how the game business operates.

== Arrival of arcade video games (1971−1977) ==
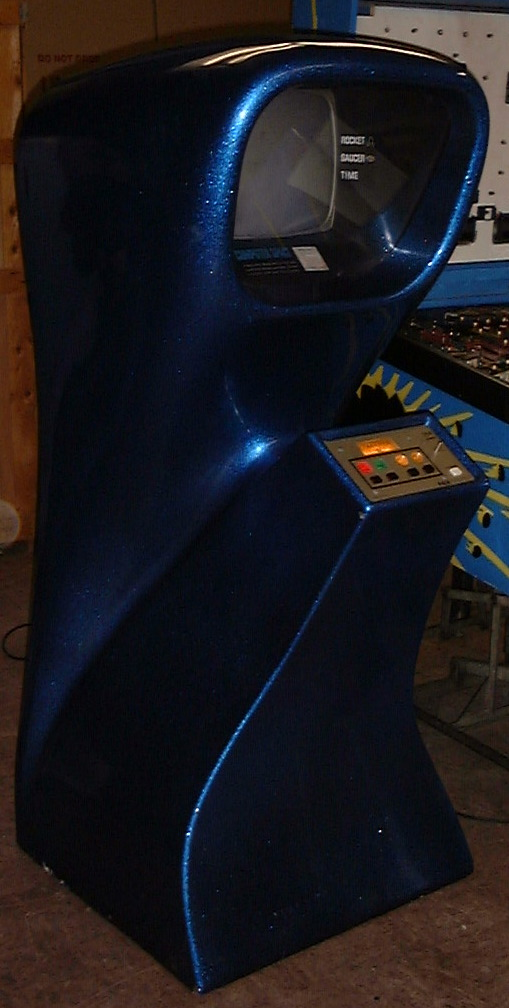
Computer Space, the first commercial arcade video game

While early video games running on computers had been developed as far back as 1950, the first video game to spread beyond a single computer installation, Spacewar!, was developed by students and staff at MIT on a PDP-1 mainframe computer in 1962. As the group that developed it migrated across the country to other schools, they took Spacewar!'s source code to run on other mainframe machines at those schools. It inspired two different groups to attempt to develop a coin-operated version of the game.

Around 1970, Nolan Bushnell was invited by a colleague to see Spacewar! running on Stanford University's PDP-6 computer. Bushnell got the idea of recreating the game on a smaller computer, a Data General Nova, connected to multiple coin-operated terminals. He and fellow Ampex employee Ted Dabney, under the company name Syzygy, worked with Nutting Associates to create Computer Space, the first commercial arcade game, with location tests in August 1971 and production starting in November. More than 1300 units of the game were sold, and while not as large of a hit game as hoped, it proved the potential for the coin-operated computer game. At Stanford University, students Bill Pitts and Hugh Tuck used a PDP-11 mainframe to build two prototypes of Galaxy Game, which they demonstrated at the university starting in November 1971, but were unable to turn into a commercial game.

Bushnell got the idea for his next game after seeing a demonstration of a table tennis game on the Magnavox Odyssey, the first home video game console that was based on the designs of Ralph H. Baer. Deciding to go on their own, Bushnell and Dabney left Nutting and reformed their company as Atari Inc., and brought on Allan Alcorn to help design an arcade game based on the Odyssey game. After a well-received trial run of a demo unit at Andy Capp's Tavern in San Jose, California in August 1972, Pong was first released in limited numbers in November 1972 with a wider release by March 1973. Pong was highly successful, with each machine earning over US$40 a day, far greater than most other coin-operated machine at the time.

With Pong's success, numerous other coin-operated manufacturers, most who were making electro-mechanical games and pinball machines, attempted to capitalize on the success of arcade games; such companies included Bally Manufacturing, Midway Manufacturing, and Williams Electronics, as well as Japanese companies Taito and Sega. Most took to trying to copy the games that Atari had already made with small alterations, leading to a wave of clones. Bushnell, having failed to patent on the idea, considered these competitors "jackals" but rather than seeking legal action, continued to have Atari devise new games. Separately, Magnavox and Sanders Associates, through which Baer had developed the basics of the Odyssey, sued Atari, among the other manufacturers, for patent violations of the basic patents behind the electronic game concepts. Bushnell opted to settle out of court, negotiating for perpetual licensing rights to Baer's patents for Atari as part of the settlement fee, which allowed Atari to pursue the development of additional arcade games and bringing Pong in a home console form, while Magnavox continued legal against the other manufacturers. It is estimated that Magnavox collected over US$100 million in awards and settlements from these suits over the Baer patents.

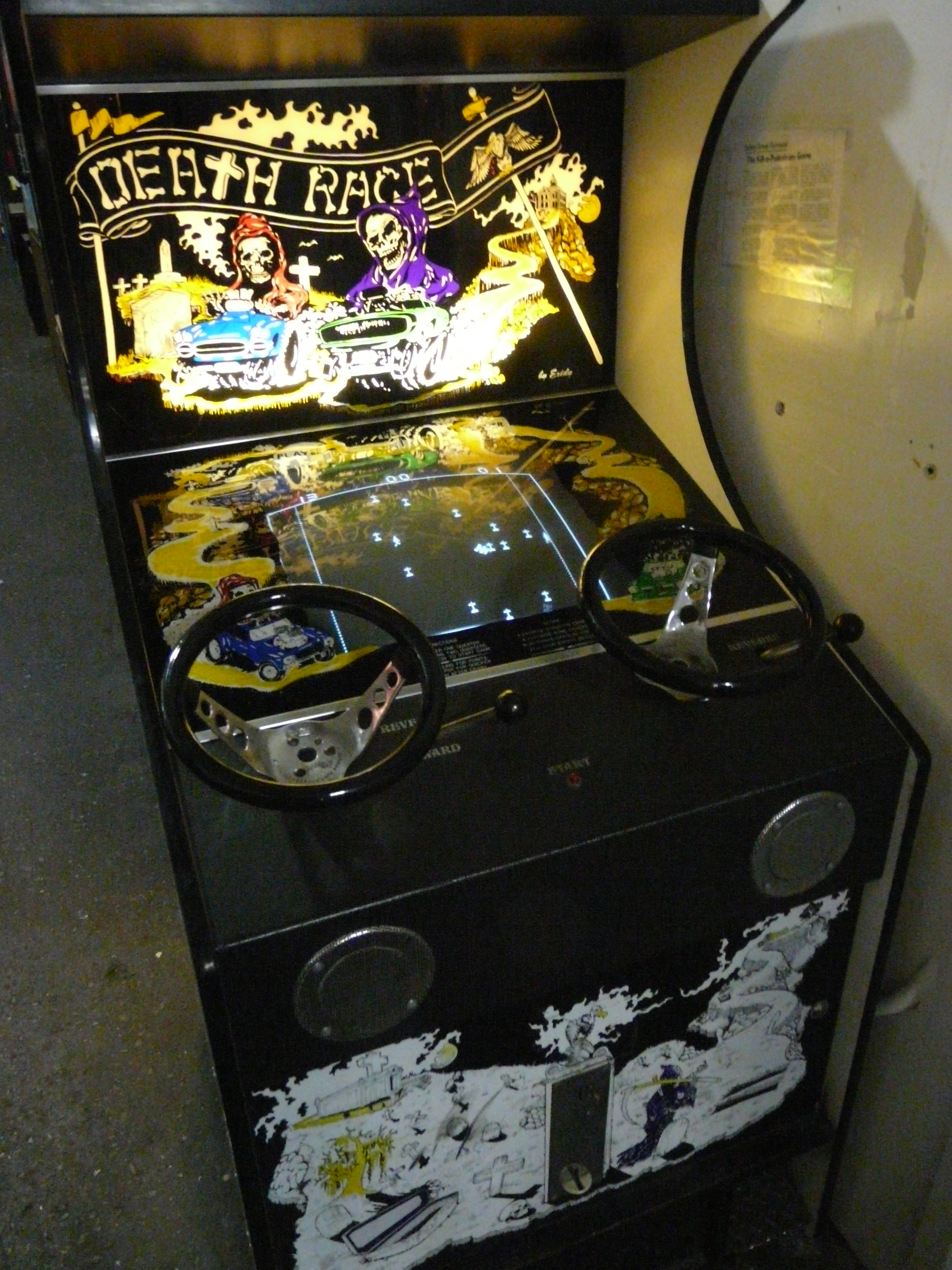
Death Race was one of the first video games to be criticized for its violence.

By the end of 1974, more than fifteen companies, both in the United States and Japan, were in the development of arcade games. A key milestone was the introduction of microprocessor technology to arcade games with Midway's Gun Fight (an adaptation of Taito's Western Gun as released in Japan), which could be programmed more directly rather than relying on the complex interaction of integrated circuitry (IC) chips.

Video games were still considered to be adult entertainment at this point, and treated as with pinball machines as games of skill, "For Amusement Only", and placed in locations that children would likely not be at such as bar and lounges. However, the same stigma that pinball machines had seen in the prior decades became to appear for video games. Notably, the release of Death Race in 1976, which involved driving over gremlins on screen, drew criticism in the United States for being too violent, and created the first major debate on violence and video games.

After the "paddle game" trend came to an end around 1975, the arcade video game industry entered a period of stagnation in the "post paddle game era" over the next several years up until 1977.

== Golden age of arcade games (1978–1983) ==
In 1978, Taito released Space Invaders, first in Japan, followed by its North American release. Among its novel gameplay features that drove its popularity, the game was the first to maintain a persistent high score. and though simplistic, used an interactive audio system that increased with the pace of the game. The game was extremely popular in both regions. In Japan, specialty arcades were established that featured only Space Invaders machines, and Taito estimated that they had sold over 100,000 machines in the country alone by the end of 1978, while in the United States, over 60,000 machines had been sold by 1980. The game was considered the best-selling video game and highest-grossing "entertainment product" of its time. Many arcade games since then have been based on "the multiple life, progressively difficult level paradigm" established by Space Invaders.

Space Invaders led to a string of popular arcade games over the next five years that are considered the "Golden Years" for arcade games. Among these titles include:

- Asteroids (Atari, 1979)
- Galaxian (Namco, 1979)
- Berzerk (Stern Electronics, 1980)
- Missile Command (Atari, 1980)
- Battle Zone (Atari, 1980)
- Pac-Man (Namco, 1980)
- Rally-X (Namco, 1980)
- Centipede (Atari, 1980)
- Defender (Williams Electronics, 1981)
- Donkey Kong (Nintendo, 1981)
- Frogger (Konami, 1981)
- Galaga (Namco, 1981)
- Scramble (Konami, 1981)
- Tempest (Atari, 1981)
- Zaxxon (Sega, 1981)

Of these, Pac-Man had an even larger impact on popular culture when it arrived in 1980; the game itself was popular but people took to Pac-Man as a mascot, leading to merchandise and an animated series of the same name in 1982. The game also inspired the Gold-certified song "Pac-Man Fever" by Buckner & Garcia. Pac-Man sold about 400,000 cabinets overall by 1982. Donkey Kong was also significant as not only being the first recognized platform game but also bringing a cute, more fantastical concept that was well-founded in Japanese culture but new to Western regions, compared to prior arcade games. Western audiences became accustomed to this level of abstraction, making later Japanese-made arcade games and titles for the Nintendo Entertainment System easily accepted by these players.

These games, along with numerous others, created video game arcades around the world. The construction boom of shopping malls in the United States during the 1970s and 1980s gave rise to dedicated arcade storefronts such as Craig Singer's Tilt Arcades. Other arcades were featured in bowling alleys and skating rinks, as well as standalone facilities, such as Bushnell's chain of Chuck E. Cheese pizzerias and arcades.

Time reported in January 1982 that there were over 13,000 arcades in the United States, with the most popular machines bringing in over $400 in profit each day. Twin Galaxies, an arcade opened by Walter Day in Ottumwa, Iowa, became known for tracking the high scores of many these top video games, and in 1982, Life featured the arcade, Day, and several of the top players at the time in a cover story, bringing the idea of a professional video game player to public consciousness. The formation of video game tournaments around arcade games in the 1980s was the predecessor of modern esports.

Arcade machines also found their way into any area where they could be placed and would be able to draw children or young adults, such as supermarkets and drug stores. The Golden Age was also buoyed by the growing home console market which had just entered the second generation with the introduction of game cartridges. Atari had been able to license Space Invaders for the Atari 2600 which became the system's killer application. Similarly, Coleco beat Atari in licensing Donkey Kong from Nintendo, and among other ports, included their conversion of the game as a pack-in for the ColecoVision, which helped to boost sales of the console and compete against the Atari 2600. Licensing of arcade hits became a major business for the home markets, which in turn spurred further growth in the arcade field. By 1981, the US arcade game market had an estimated value of $8 billion.

Jonathan Greenberg of Forbes predicted in early 1981 that Japanese companies would eventually dominate the North American video game industry, as American video game companies were increasingly licensing products from Japanese companies, who in turn were opening up North American branches. By 1982–1983, Japanese manufacturers had captured a large share of the North American arcade market, which Gene Lipkin of Data East USA partly attributed to Japanese companies having more finances to invest in new ideas.

Global revenue estimates of the arcade video game industry from 1971 to 2018, according to market research firm Pelham Smithers.

== End of the golden age (1984) ==
Though 1982 was recognized as the height of success of the video game arcade, many in the industry knew the success could not last too long. Walter Day had commented in 1982 that there were "too many arcades" by that point for what was really needed. Additionally, players required novelty and new games, and thus required older games to be discontinued and replaced with new ones, but not all new games were as successful as those at the height of the Golden Age. Knowing that players were seeking more challenge, game manufacturers designed the newer games to be harder, but this caused less-skilled mainstream players to be turned away.

Coupled with this was an increased pressure on possible harmful impacts of video games on children. Arcades had taken steps to make their venues as "family fun centers" alleviate some concerns, but parents and activists still saw video games as potentially addictive and leading to aggressive behavior. The U.S. Surgeon General C. Everett Koop spoke in November 1982 about the potential addiction of video game by young children, as part general moral concerns around youth in the early 1980s. These fears not only affected video game arcades, but other places where youth would normally be able to hang out without adult supervision such as shopping malls and skating rinks. There were also reports of increased crime associated with arcades due to lack of adult supervision. Many cities and towns implemented bans on arcades or limiting businesses to only a few machines by the mid-1980s.

Several of these bans were challenged by arcade owners on First Amendment grounds, asserting video games merits protection as an art form, but the bulk of these cases ruled against arcades, favoring local regulations that were limiting conduct rather than restricting speech. Further impacting the arcades, the rising popularity of home consoles threatened the arcades, since players did not have to repeatedly spend money to play at arcades when they could play at home. But with the 1983 video game crash which drastically affected the home console market, the arcade market also felt its impact as it was already waning from oversaturation, loss of players, and the moral concerns over video games, all stressed by the early 1980s recession.

Arcade games became relatively dormant in the United States for a while, declining from the peak financial success of the golden age. The US arcade industry had declined from a peak of $8.9 billion in 1982 down to $4.5 billion in 1984. The US arcade video game market was sluggish in 1984, but Sega president Hayao Nakayama was confident that good games "can surely be sold in the U.S. market, if done adequately." Sega announced plans to open a new US subsidiary for early 1985, which Game Machine magazine predicted would "most probably enliven" the American video game business. Despite the downturn in 1984, John Lotz of Betson Pacific Distributing predicted that another arcade boom could potentially happen by the early 1990s.

== Market recovery (1985−1990) ==
The arcade industry began recovering in 1985 and made a comeback by 1986, with the arcade industry experiencing several years of growth during the late 1980s. A major factor in its recovery was the arrival of software conversion kit systems, such as Sega's Convert-a-Game system, the Atari System 1, and the Nintendo VS. System, the latter being the Western world's introduction to the Famicom (NES) hardware in 1984, prior to the official release of the NES console; the success of the VS. System in arcades was instrumental to the release and success of the NES in North America. Other major factors that helped revive arcades were the arrival of popular martial arts action games (including fighting games such as Karate Champ and Yie Ar Kung-Fu, and beat 'em ups such as Kung-Fu Master and Renegade), advanced motion simulator games (such as Sega's "taikan" games including Hang-On, Space Harrier and Out Run), and the resurgence of sports video games (such as Track & Field, Punch-Out and Tehkan World Cup).

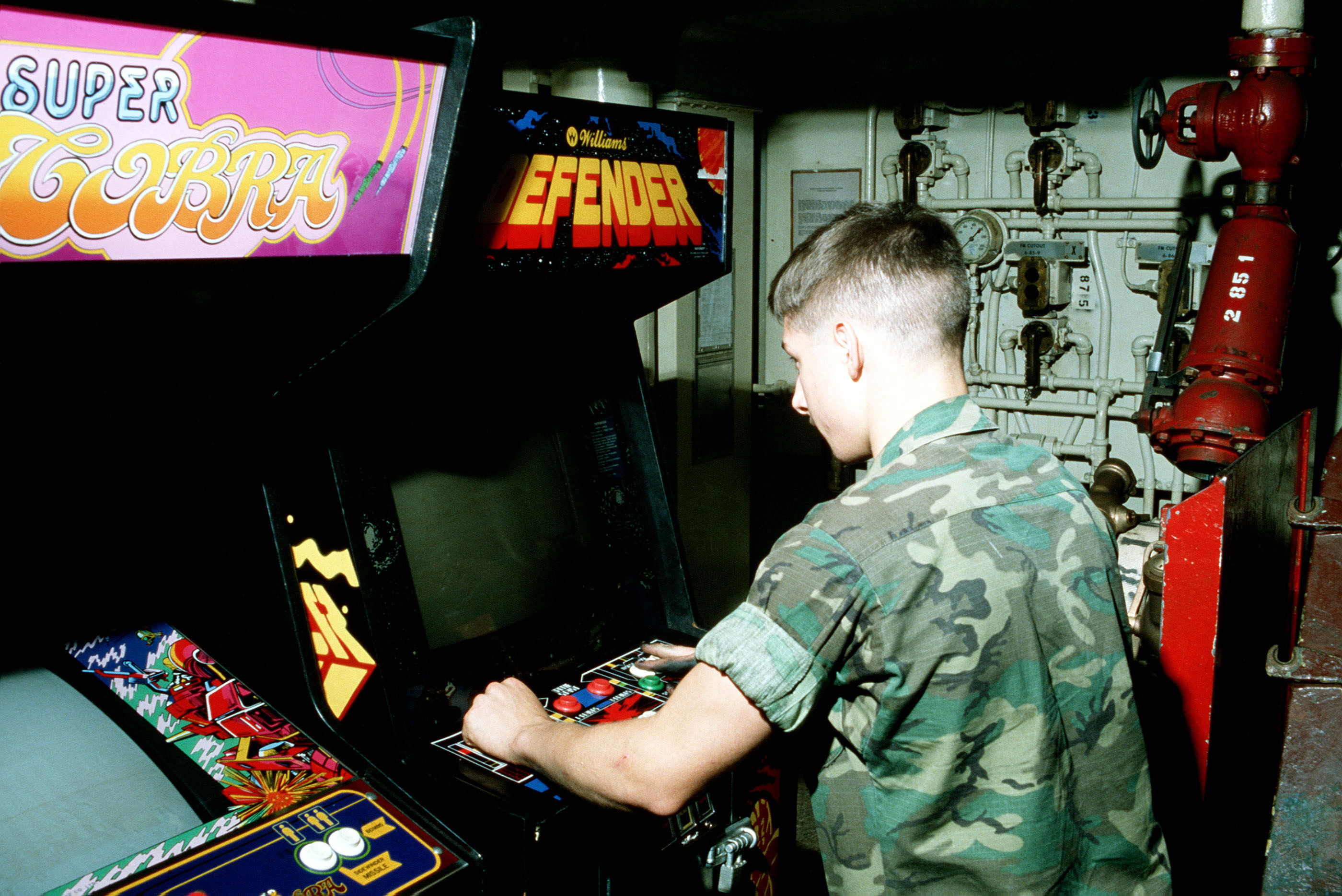
A US Marine playing Defender in the USS America, 1982

By 1985, the arcade industry was largely dominated by Japanese manufacturers, with the number of American manufacturers having declined. By 1988, annual US arcade video game revenue had increased to $5,500,000,000 (equivalent to $15,000,000,000 in 2025). However, competition from new home consoles, like the Nintendo Entertainment System (NES) that had revitalized the home video game industry, were drawing players away from the arcades. After the NES took off in North America, home consoles kept many children at home and under parental supervision, keeping them away from arcades. The US arcade video game market experienced another decline from 1989. RePlay magazine partly attributed the decline to the rise of home consoles following the success of the NES. In Japan, on the other hand, the arcade market grew while home video game sales declined. Overall, the worldwide arcade market continued to grow, remaining larger than the console market.

Various technological advances were made in arcades during this era. Sega's Hang-On, designed by Yu Suzuki and running on the Sega Space Harrier hardware, was the first of Sega's 16-bit "Super Scaler" arcade system boards that pushed pseudo-3D sprite-scaling at high frame rates. Hang-On also used a motion-controlled arcade cabinet that included a mounted motorbike-like control unit on a hydraulic system, which the player used to control the game by tilting their body to the left or right, two decades before motion controls became popular on consoles. This game began the "taikan" ("body sensation") trend, the use of motion simulator arcade cabinets in many arcade games of the late 1980s, such as Sega's Space Harrier (1985), Out Run (1986) and After Burner (1987).

SNK also launched its Neo Geo line in 1990 to try to bridge the arcade and home console gap. The launch consisted of the Neo Geo Multi Video System (MVS) arcade system and the Neo Geo Advanced Entertainment System (AES). Both units shared the same game cartridges, with the MVS able to support up to six different games at the same time selectable by the player. Further, players could use a memory card to transfer save game information from the MVS to their home AES and back. Arcade systems dedicated to flat-shaded 3D polygon graphics also began emerging, with the Namco System 21 used for Winning Run (1988) and the related Atari Games hardware for Hard Drivin' (1989), as well as the Taito Air System used for amateur flight simulations such as Midnight Landing (1987) and Air Inferno (1990).

One format of arcade video games that briefly expanded during this period were quiz-style or trivia-based arcade games. Besides the other avenues of technical advances, the hardware for arcade machines had shrunk small enough that the core electronics could be fitted into cocktail-style cabinets or half-height bartop or countertop versions, making them ideal for placement in more adult venues. Coupled with waning interest in traditional arcade games due to the 1983 video game crash and the rising popularity of the board game Trivial Pursuit first introduced in 1981, several manufacturers turned to quiz style games to be sold to bars in these smaller formats, including more risque titles. Manufacturers also saw similar opportunities to promote these games for family-oriented entertainment and potential use as educational tools. The rush of arcade-based trivia games waned around 1986 as the general interest in trivia waned, but arcades and other entertainment businesses managed to find ways to keep trivia-style games going within arcades since, often based on multiplayer trivia challenges played out on multiple screens. These trivia games also influenced the creation of trivia games on consoles and computers such as the You Don't Know Jack series of games and Trivia HQ.

== Resurgence and 3D revolution (1991−1997) ==
=== Fighting game boom ===
Arcade games gained a resurgence with the introduction of Street Fighter II by Capcom in 1991. The original Street Fighter in 1987 had already introduced a fighting game game format that allowed two players to challenge each other, but the characters were generic combatants. Street Fighter II introduced modern elements to the genre and created the fundamental one-on-one fighting game template, featuring numerous characters with backgrounds and personalities to select from and a wide range of special moves to use. Street Fighter II sold more than 200,000 cabinets worldwide, and drew other arcade manufacturers to make similar fighting games, including Mortal Kombat in 1992, Virtua Fighter in 1993, and Tekken in 1994. The period was referred to as a "boom" or "renaissance" for the arcade industry, with the success of Street Fighter II drawing comparisons to that of arcade golden age blockbusters Space Invaders and Pac-Man.

By 1993, arcade games in the United States were generating an annual revenue of $7,000,000,000 (equivalent to $15,600,000,000 in 2025), larger than both the home video game market ($6 billion) as well as the film box office market ($5 billion). Worldwide arcade video game revenue also maintained its lead over consoles. In 1993, Electronic Games noted that when "historians look back at the world of coin-op during the early 1990s, one of the defining highlights of the video game art form will undoubtedly focus on fighting/martial arts themes" which it described as "the backbone of the industry" at the time. Mortal Kombat, however, led to further controversy over violence in video games due to its gruesome-looking finishing moves. When the game was ported to home consoles in 1993, it led to U.S. Congressional hearings on violence in video games, which resulted in the formation of the Entertainment Software Ratings Board (ESRB) in 1994 to avoid government oversight in video games. Despite this, fighting games remained the dominant style of game in arcades through the early-mid 1990s.

=== 3D revolution ===
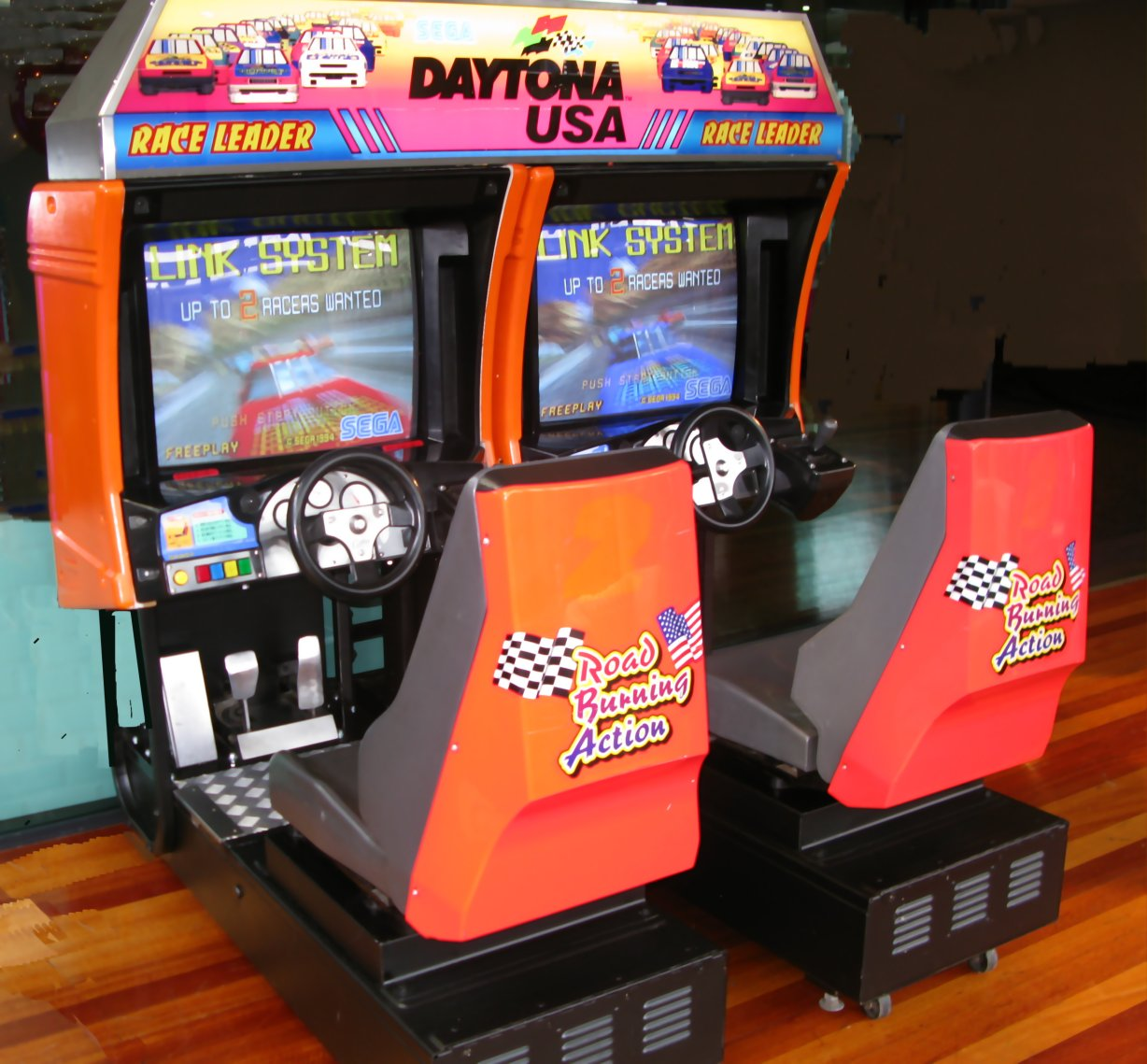
A twin-racer model of Daytona USA

Another factor that contributed to the arcade "renaissance" was increasingly realistic games, notably the "3D Revolution" where arcade games made the transition from 2D and pseudo-3D graphics to true real-time 3D polygon graphics, largely driven by a technological arms race rivalry between Sega and Namco.

The Namco System 21 which was originally developed for racing games in the late 1980s was adapted by Namco for new 3D action games in the early 1990s, such as the rail shooters Galaxian 3 (1990) and Solvalou (1991). Sega responded with the Sega Model 1, which further popularized 3D polygons with Sega AM2 games including Virtua Racing (1992) and the fighting game Virtua Fighter (1993), which popularized 3D polygon human characters. Namco then responded with the Namco System 22, capable of 3D polygon texture mapping and Gouraud shading, used for Ridge Racer (1993). The Sega Model 2 took it further with 3D polygon texture filtering, used by 1994 for racers such as Daytona USA, fighting games such as Virtua Fighter 2, and light gun shooters such as Virtua Cop. Namco responded with 3D fighters such as Tekken (1994) and 3D light gun shooters such as Time Crisis (1995), the latter running on the Super System 22.

Other arcade manufacturers were also manufacturing 3D arcade hardware by this time, including Midway, Konami, and Taito, as well as Mesa Logic with light gun shooter Area 51 (1995). The new, more realistic 3D games gained considerable popularity in arcades, especially in more family-family fun centers. Virtual reality (VR) also began appearing in arcades during the early 1990s. The Amusement & Music Operators Association (AMOA) in the United States held its second largest AMOA show ever in 1994, after the 1982 AMOA show.

=== Home console competition ===
In the mid-1990s, the fifth-generation home consoles, Sega Saturn, PlayStation, and Nintendo 64, began offering true 3D graphics, along with improved sound and better 2D graphics than the previous fourth generation of video game consoles. By 1995, personal computers followed, with 3D accelerator cards. the technological advantage that arcade games had, in their ability to customize and use the latest graphics and sound chips, began narrowing, and the convenience of console games caused a decline in arcade gaming in the latter half of the 90s. Sega's sixth generation console, the Dreamcast, could produce 3D graphics comparable to the Sega NAOMI arcade system in 1998, after which Sega produced more powerful arcade systems such as the Sega NAOMI Multiboard and Sega Hikaru in 1999 and the Sega NAOMI 2 in 2000, before Sega eventually stopped manufacturing expensive proprietary arcade system boards, with their subsequent arcade boards being based on more affordable commercial console or PC components.

By the late 1990s, arcade video games lost dominance, while console games overtook arcade video games for the first time at around 1997. Until then, the arcade video game market had larger revenue than consoles. In 1997, Konami began releasing a number of music-based games that used unique peripherals to control the game in time to music, including Beatmania and GuitarFreaks, culminating in the 1998 release of Dance Dance Revolution (DDR) in Japan, a new style of arcade game that used a dance pad and required players to tap their feet on appropriate squares on the pad in time to notes on screen in synchronization to popular music. DDR later released in the West in 1999, and while it did not enjoy the same popularity in Japan initially, it led the trend of rhythm games in arcades.

== Regional divergences (2000−2019) ==
Worldwide arcade video game revenue stabilized in the early 2000s after years of declining revenue in the latter half of the 1990s, during which time it had been surpassed in revenue by the console, handheld and PC game industries. Arcade video games continue to be a thriving industry in Eastern Asian countries such as Japan and China, where arcades are widespread across the region.

=== United States ===
Since the 2000s, arcade games and arcades in the United States have generally had to continue as niche markets to adapt to remain profitable, competition against the allure of home consoles. Most arcades were unable to sustain on operating arcade games alone, and have since added back redemption systems for prizes along with non-arcade games for these, such as Dave & Busters. Arcade games were developed to try to create experiences that could not be had via home consoles, such as motion simulator games, but their expense and space required was difficult to justify over more traditional games. The US market has experienced a slight resurgence, with the number of video game arcades across the nation increasing from 2,500 in 2003 to 3,500 in 2008, though this is significantly less than the 10,000 arcades in the early 1980s. As of 2009, a successful arcade game usually sells around 4000 to 6000 units worldwide. Since around 2018, arcades specializing in virtual reality games have also become popular, allowing players to experience these games without the hardware investment in VR headsets.

The relative simplicity yet solid gameplay of many of these early games has inspired a new generation of fans who can play them on mobile phones or with emulators such as MAME. Some classic arcade games are reappearing in commercial settings, such as Namco's Ms. Pac-Man/Galaga: Class of 1981 two-in-one game, or integrated directly into controller hardware (joysticks) with replaceable flash drives storing game ROMs. Arcade classics have also been reappearing as mobile games, with Pac-Man in particular selling over 30 million downloads in the United States by 2010. Arcade classics also began to appear on replica multi-game arcade machines for home users, using emulation on modern hardware.

=== Japan ===
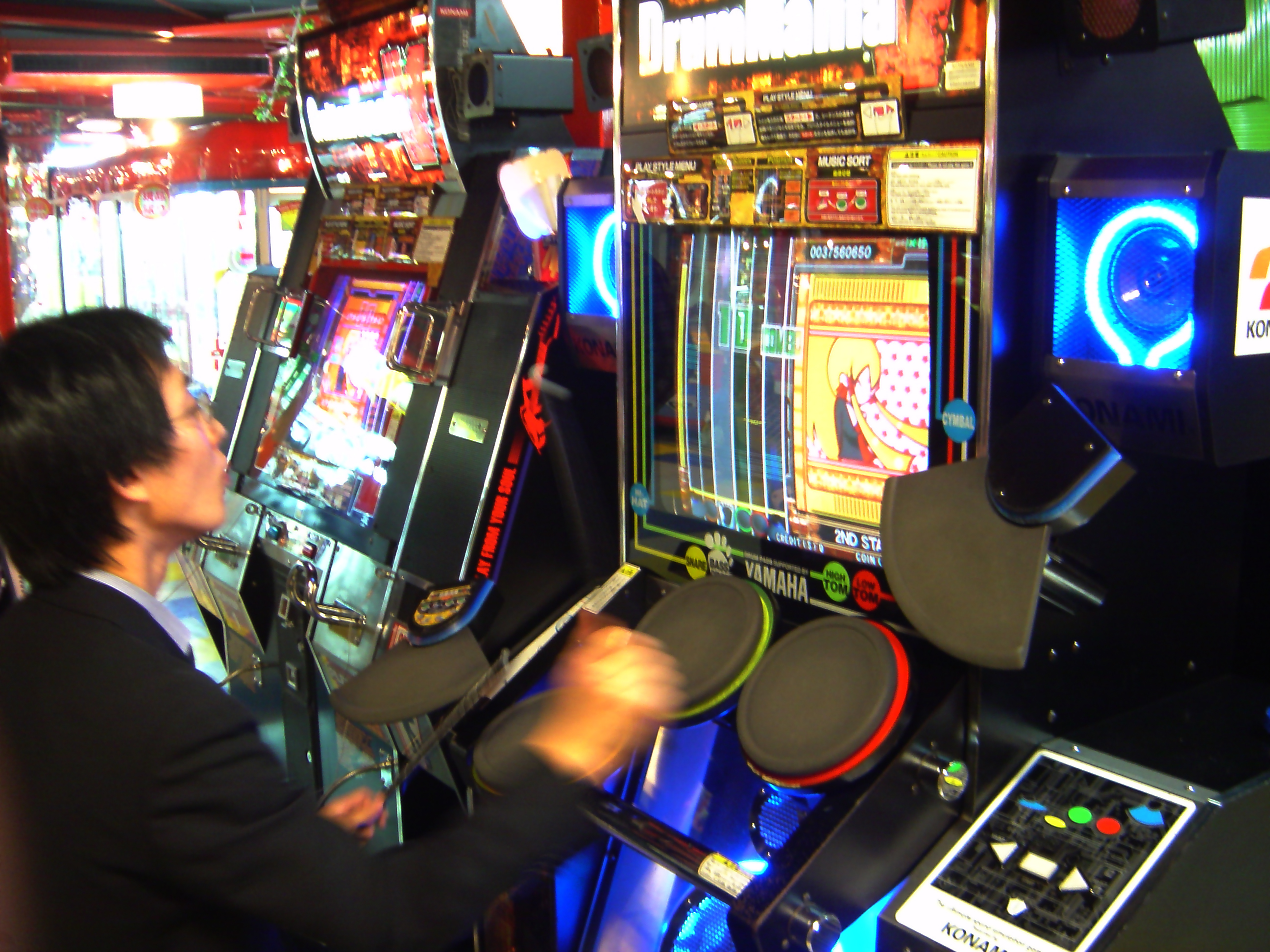
A man playing a drumming arcade game (Drummania) in Tsukuba, Ibaraki, 2005

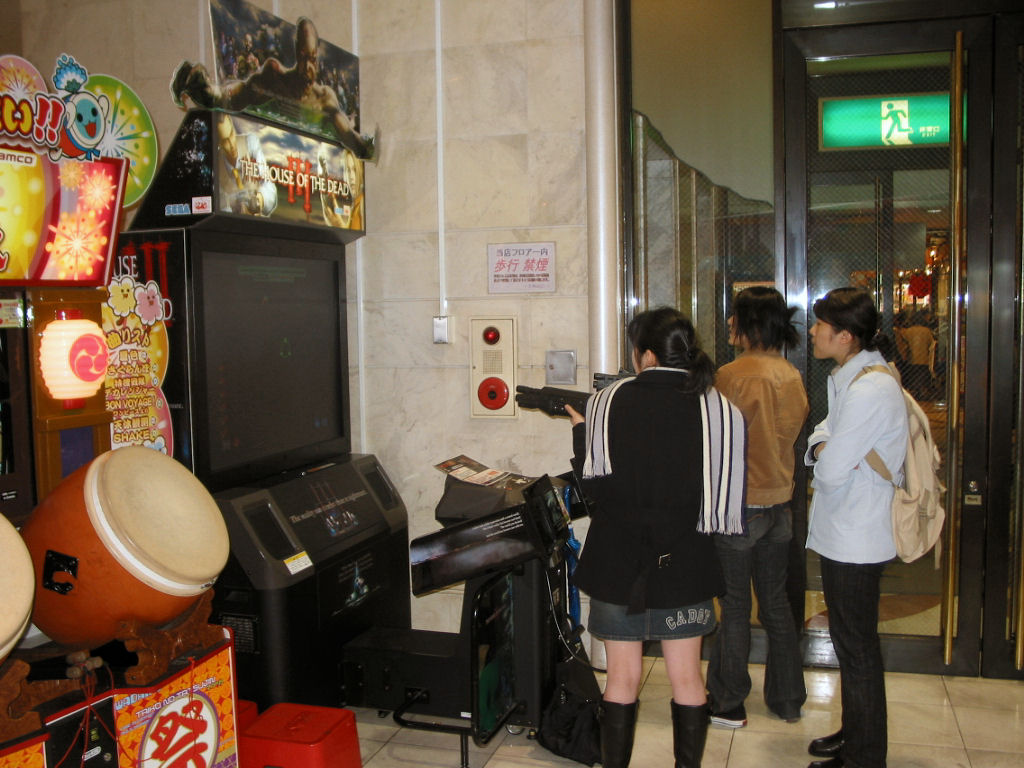
Girls playing The House of the Dead III in an amusement arcade in Japan, 2005

In the Japanese gaming industry, arcades have remained popular since the 2000s. Much of the consistent popularity and growing industry is due to several factors such as support for continued innovation and that developers of machines own the arcades. Additionally, Japan arcade machines are notably more unique as to US machines, where Japanese arcades can offer experiences that players could not get at home. This is constant throughout Japanese arcade history. As of 2009, out of Japan's US$20 billion gaming market, US$6 billion of that amount is generated from arcades, which represent the largest sector of the Japanese video game market, followed by home console games and mobile games at US$3.5 billion and US$2 billion, respectively.

According to in 2005, arcade ownership and operation accounted for a majority of Namco's for example. With considerable withdrawal from the arcade market from companies such as Capcom, Sega became the strongest player in the arcade market with 60% marketshare in 2006. Despite the global decline of arcades, Japanese companies hit record revenue for three consecutive years during this period. However, due to the country's economic recession, the Japanese arcade industry has also been steadily declining, from ¥702.9 billion (US$8.7 billion) in 2007 to ¥504.3 billion (US$6.2 billion) in 2010. In 2013, estimation of revenue is ¥470 billion.

The layout of an arcade in Japan greatly differs from an arcade in America. The arcades of Japan are multi-floor complexes (often taking up entire buildings), split into sections by game types. On the ground level the arcade typically hosts physically demanding games that draw crowds of onlookers, like music rhythm games. Another floor is often a maze of multi-player games and battle simulators. These multi-player games often have online connectivity tracking rankings and reputation of each player; top players are revered and respected in arcades. The top floor of the arcade is typically for rewards where Players can trade credits or tickets for prizes. In the 2000s, arcade games shifted from a model where skilled players spent little money to one that emphasized high-spending players, anticipating monetization strategies later common in mobile games.

In the Japanese market, network and card features introduced by Virtua Fighter 4 and World Club Champion Football, and novelty cabinets such as Gundam Pod machines have caused revitalizations in arcade profitability in Japan.

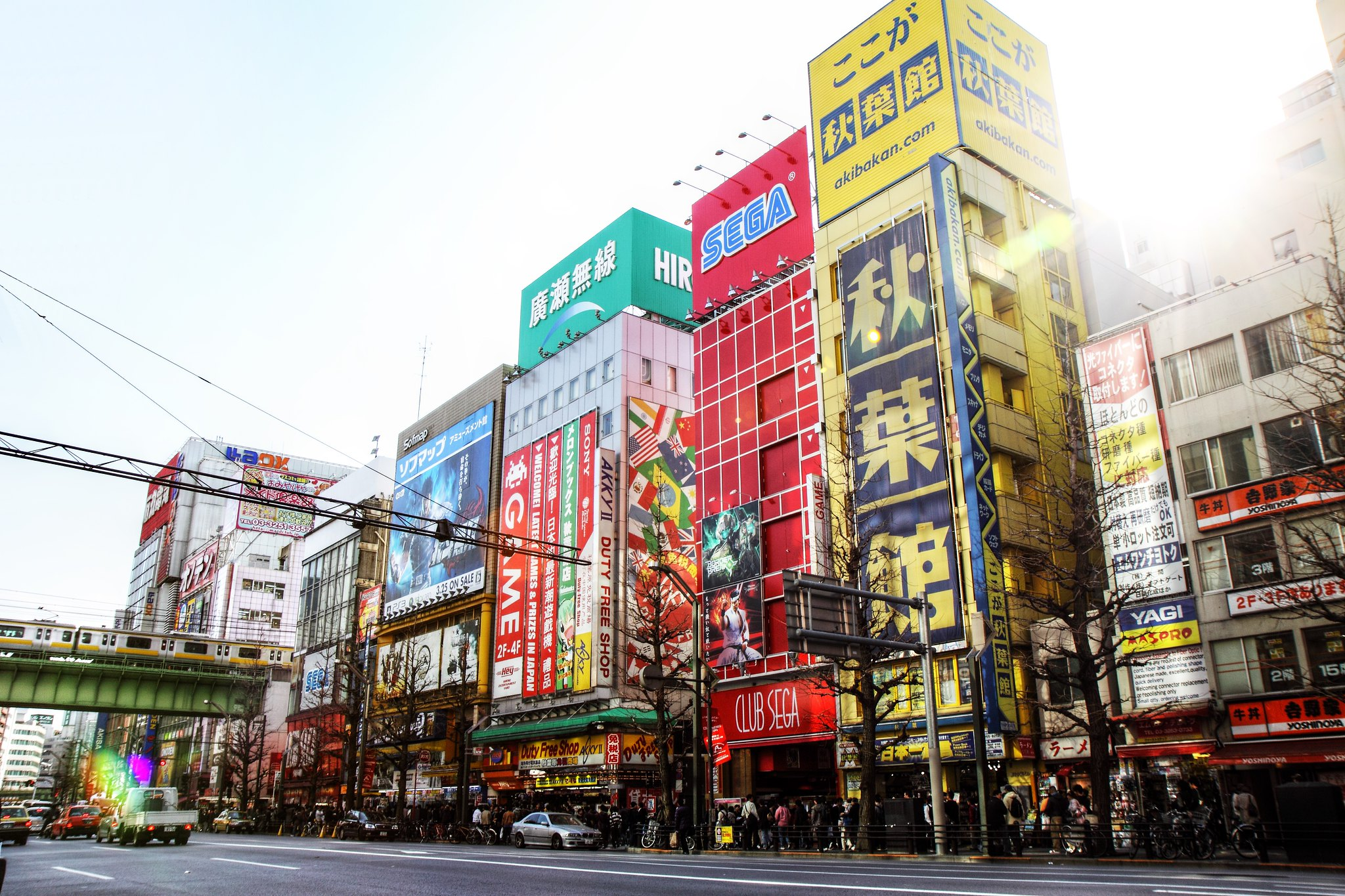
Outside of Sega Arcade, a famous arcade located in Akihabara, Japan

Former rivals in the Japanese arcade industry, Konami, Taito, Bandai Namco Entertainment and Sega, collaborated during the period. Approaching the end of the 2010s, the typical business of the Japanese arcade shifted further as arcade video games were less predominant, accounting for only 13% of revenue in arcades in 2017, while redemption games like claw crane machines were the most popular. By 2019, only about four thousand arcades remained in Japan, down from the height of 22,000 in 1989.

== COVID-19 pandemic and decline (2020−present) ==
The impact of the COVID-19 pandemic from March 2020 onward on arcades financially harmed many arcades that were still operating. In Japan, arcades did not qualify for funding to recover from lost revenue from the Japanese government. In the wake of the pandemic, several long-standing arcades were forced to close; notably, Sega sold off most of its arcade business. Financial analysis firm Teikoku Databank reported in 2024 that they estimated that over 8000 arcades had closed in the previous decade, with arcade games being shifted away in favor of redemption games. Large game companies view the remaining arcade businesses "as a rapidly sinking ship", and regard future investment in arcade titles as "fruitless". The decline was experienced strongly among gambling oriented games such as Pachislot. A UK arcade owner described a similar situation there, saying that "All arcades are either closed or suffering hardships."

== See also ==
- History of mobile games
- History of online games
- History of video games
- List of arcade video games
