= History of mobile games =

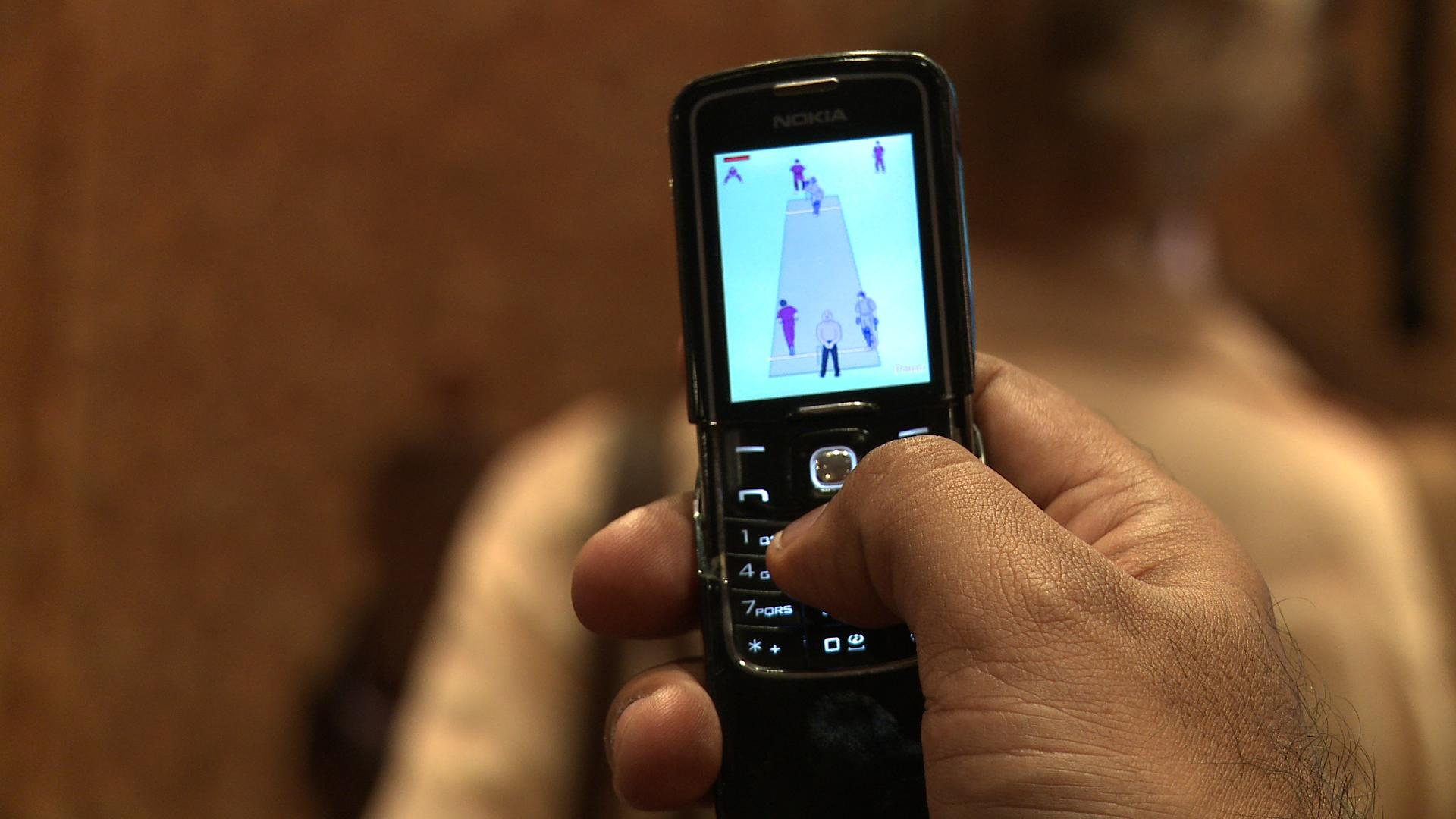
A person playing a game on a Nokia phone

The popularisation of mobile games began as early as 1997 with the introduction of Snake preloaded on Nokia feature phones, demonstrating the practicality of games on these devices. Several mobile device manufacturers included preloaded games in the wake of Snake's success. In 1999, the introduction of the i-mode service in Japan allowed a wide variety of more advanced mobile games to be downloaded onto smartphones, though the service was largely limited to Japan. By the early 2000s, the technical specifications of Western handsets had also matured to the point where downloadable applications (including games) could be supported, but mainstream adoption continued to be hampered by market fragmentation between different devices, operating environments, and distributors.

The introduction of the iPhone and its dedicated App Store provided a standard means for developers of any size to develop and publish games for the popular smartphone. Several early success stories from app developers in the wake of the App Store's launch in 2008 attracted a large number of developers to speculate on the platform. Most initial games were published as premium (pay-once) titles, but the addition of in-app purchases in October 2009 allowed games to try other models, with notable successes Angry Birds and Cut the Rope using a combination of free-to-try and ad-supported games. Apple's success with the App Store drastically altered the mobile landscape and within a few years left only its and Google's Android-based smartphones using its Google Play app store as the dominant players.

A major transition in game monetization came with the introduction of Candy Crush Saga and Puzzle & Dragons, taking gameplay concepts from social-network games which generally required the player to wait some length of time after exhausting a number of turns for a day, and offering the use of in-app purchases to refresh their energy. These games generated revenue numbers previously unseen in the mobile game sector, and became the standard for many freemium games that followed. Many of the most successful games have hundreds of millions of players, and have annual revenues exceeding US$100 million a year, with the top games breaking US$1 billion.

More recent trends have included hyper-casual games such as Crossy Road and location-based games like Pokémon Go.

== Prior to mobile phones ==
Early precursors of mobile gaming include handheld electronic games and early handheld video game consoles, though these devices were always game-oriented with nearly no utility function. Nintendo's Gunpei Yokoi had conceived of their Game & Watch line - handheld games that also served as a digital timepiece - after seeing a bored businessman on a commuter train pass time by using a calculator to play makeshift games.

Personal digital assistants (PDAs), precursors themselves to modern smartphones, arrived in 1984, and early models included built-in or add-ons games such as with the Sharp Wizard in 1989. As most PDAs used low resolution monochromatic liquid crystal display (LCD)s designed for displaying text over graphics, these games tended to be simple, which included block or tile games like Tetris. These types of games carried over into some of the earlier smartphone models but did not have as much popularity, such as on the Hagenuk MT-2000 in 1993.

== Introducing gaming on smartphones (1997−2006) ==
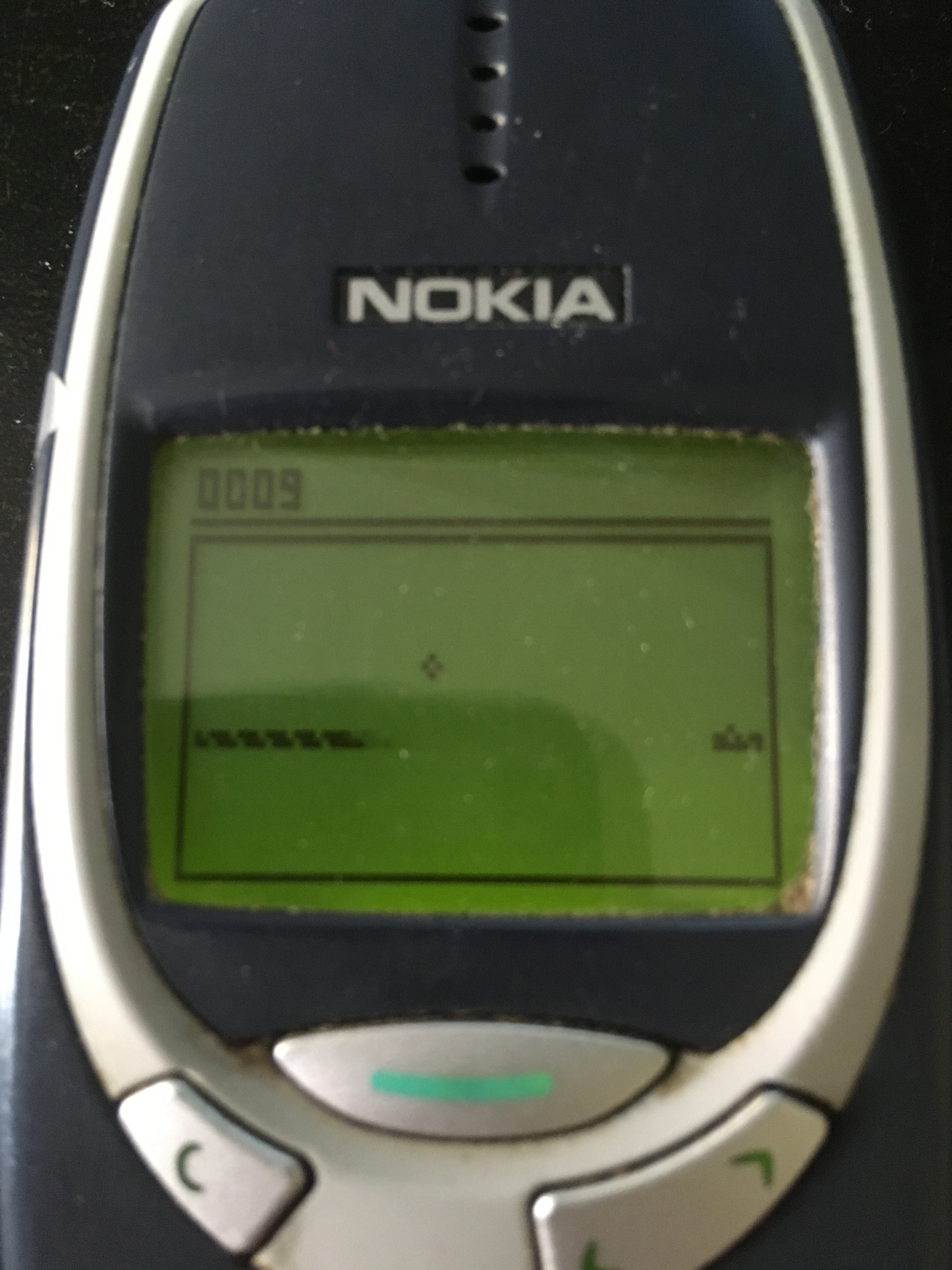
Snake being played on the screen of a Nokia 3310 handset

In 1997, Nokia introduced its Nokia 6110 mobile phone which included Snake. Snake proved to be one of the phone's popular features, and Nokia continued to include the game, or a variation of it, on nearly every phone it released since, with about 400 million devices shipped with the game installed as of 2016.

In 1999, NTT Docomo launched the i-mode mobile platform in Japan, allowing mobile games to be downloaded onto smartphones. Several Japanese video game developers announced games for the i-mode platform that year, such as Konami announcing its dating simulation Tokimeki Memorial. The same year, Nintendo and Bandai were developing mobile phone adapters for their handheld game consoles, the Game Boy Color and WonderSwan, respectively. By 2001, i-mode had 20 million users in Japan, along with more advanced handsets with graphics comparable to 8-bit consoles. A wide variety of games were available for the i-mode service, along with announcements from established video game developers such as Taito, Konami, Namco, and Hudson Soft, including ports of classic arcade games and 8-bit console games.

Snake showed there was a viable interest in expanding the capabilities of mobile phones for gaming applications. With the introduction of the Wireless Application Protocol (WAP), many mobile phones were able to access limited browser-based games, and later downloading new apps that could be purchased from their wireless carrier or a third party distributor to use on their phone. However, at this stage, in the early 2000s, there was a wide discrepancies of technologies available in terms of both hardware and software. Phones were still of a wide ranges of form factors, input features, and screen resolutions, so game developers were typically focused their efforts on specific software platforms and subsets of available devices. Additionally, a range of software platform standards, like J2ME, Macromedia Flash Lite, DoJa, and Binary Runtime Environment for Wireless (BREW), existed, the implementations of which varied by phone manufacturer and model, further limiting portability of games. Thus, while games were developed for mobile devices over the next several years, they tended to be limited. Mobile game discoverability was further complicated by the limitations of the early mobile internet. Games were often primarily offered via a content store provided by a wireless carrier (the "carrier deck"). Publishers would license games for inclusion on these portals. These stores tended to be largely text-based, offering very limited descriptions of products or sophisticated search and navigation. As a result, games promoted by carriers (thereby appearing nearer the top of the store) tended to be greatly more successful, while others listed below would not be seen by many users who did not scroll beyond the first page of the deck.

Prior to 2007, Japan was the leading developer for games on handsets since most of the primary handset developers were located there and smartphones had a greater proliferation among the population. A wide array of various genres were tried, including virtual pet games which used early camera phone features as part of the gameplay cycle.

Meanwhile, handheld consoles still typically offered superior gaming experiences compared to the limited smartphone games; Nintendo had released its Game Boy Advance in 2001 as a successor to the widely popular Game Boy. To try to merge the two markets, Nokia released the N-Gage in 2003, designed as both a handheld console and a phone. The N-Gage was able to offer similar video games as the Advance, but even with its N-Gage QD redesign in 2004, the unit was a commercial failure.

== The iPhone and the App Store (2007−2008) ==
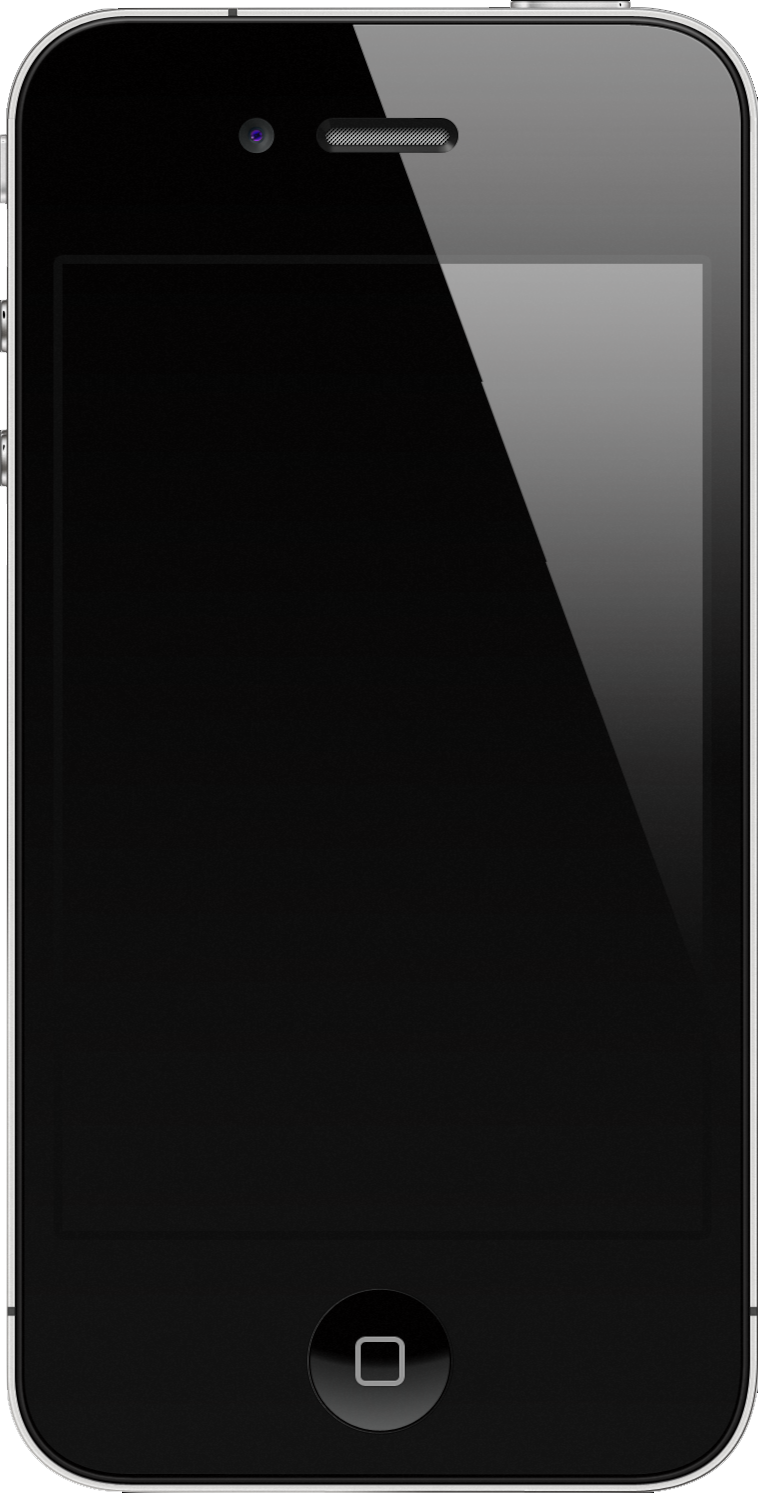
The iPhone (an iPhone 4 shown) drastically changed both the smartphone market and the mobile game industry.

Apple, Inc. had been an early player in the PDA market with the Apple Newton, but Steve Jobs had discontinued the line in 1998 to focus the company's hardware towards devices like the iMac and iPod. Under Jobs' direction, the same teams worked to develop the iPhone, which Apple first released in June 2007. Among key hardware features in the iPhone was a large random access memory (RAM) size compared to most other smartphones on the market as well as a larger screen, making it capable of running more complex apps, and a new operating system that could handle multitasking, far surpassing any other device on the market at the time. The iPhone also included various sensors such as an accelerometer, and also included a capacitive touchscreen that did not require any stylus and could be controlled by a finger, with later models adding support for multipoint sensing. In 2008, alongside the iPhone 3G, Apple released an iPhone OS software development kit, allowing developers to officially and inexpensively develop native apps (whereas previously, only web apps were allowed and native apps could only be installed through jailbreaking), which could be published through the newly available App Store.

Developers, including game developers, rushed to take advantage of the App Store. At launch, there were 500 apps, while six months later, there were over 15,000, along with over half a billion app downloads. These figured doubled three months later (circa March 2009), and by November 2009, the App Store had over 100,000 apps with over 2 billion downloads.

Gaming applications were one major area that found success on the App Store. One such early success was Trism, a tile-matching game incorporating the phone's accelerometer released near the App Store launch developed by a single person, Steve Demeter. Demeter had priced the game at US$5, and within two months of launch, had made US$250,000 in profit, and Demeter was highly publicized as a rags to riches story on the lucrative nature of developing for the iPhone. Another early success was Tap Tap Revenge, a rhythm game by Tapulous, which also was released at the App Store's launch and saw over one million downloads in 20 days. Following on similar stories, numerous smaller developers tried to release the next big game, while larger game publishers took to their existing catalogs and released mobile-compatible titles where possible. PopCap Games, which had already had success with a line of computer and browser-based puzzle games such as Bejeweled, was one of the first companies to transition their products to mobile versions in 2009 which helped them to rapidly grow their mobile business, leading to their acquisition by Electronic Arts in 2011 as to allow Electronic Arts to compete in the mobile and casual games area.

Beyond games, the iPhone and App Store caused most other smartphone manufacturers to abandon their own attempts to build out a more sophisticated smartphone environment, such as BlackBerry and Symbian. BlackBerry had attempted to release its own app store but failed to gain the success as Apple's. Only two major competitors remained after the iPhone's introduction, the Android-based devices (based on the Java language), using the operating system that had been developed by Google, and Windows Phone by Microsoft which had close interoperability with its Microsoft Windows operating system. Both took up the same approach as Apple, introducing app stores in Google Play and Windows Phone Store, respectively, with similar developer policies. Ultimately, Microsoft ceased active development of Windows Phone, leaving iOS and Android as the principle players in the mobile operating system and app store market.

== Angry Birds: transitioning from premium to free-to-play (2009–2011) ==
At launch, the iOS App Store only allowed single-time purchases of apps akin to how one purchased music from iTunes, so most games were purchased on the traditional "premium" model, buying the game upfront. In October 2009, the store introduced "in-app purchases" (IAP), microtransactions that an app could offer with the transaction made through the App Store's storefront. Some existing app devs were savvy to jump on this; Tapulous released Tap Tap Revenge 3 shortly after this change that included IAP to obtain new songs. Similar IAPs were added to the Google Play store on Android as well.

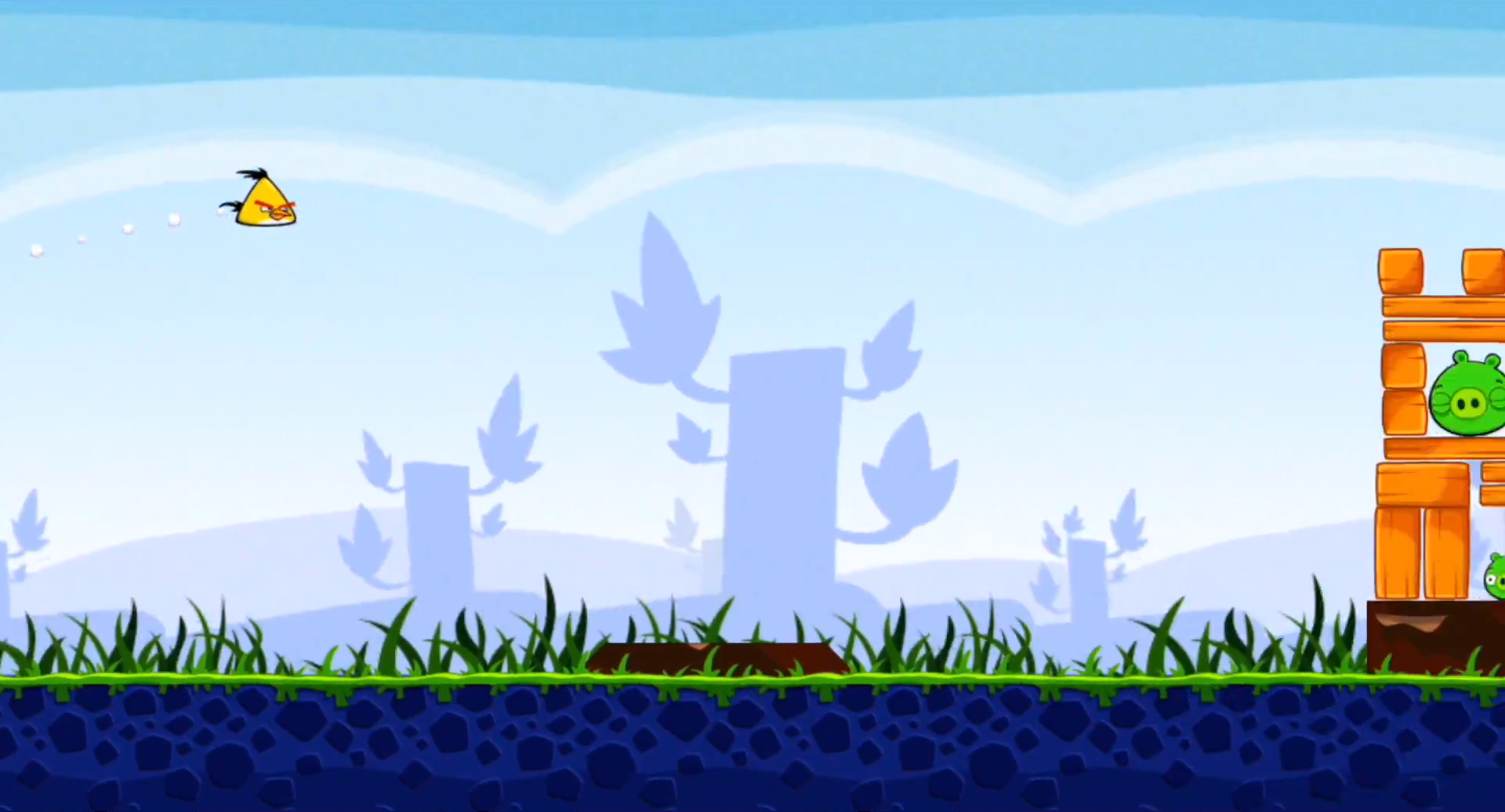
Gameplay screenshot of Angry Birds

In December 2009, Rovio Entertainment released Angry Birds on the App Store, a physics-based game involving launching cartoonish birds at structures occupied by pigs that have stolen their eggs as to do as much damage as possible, which had been inspired by the browser game Crush the Castle and others like it. As released on the iOS store, it was still a premium game at US$0.99, and its low cost, as well as being featured by Apple in February 2010, led to it becoming highly successful and leading the Top Paid App charts by mid-2010. When Rovio ported the game to Android, they introduced an ad-supported version that could be downloaded for free, but a user could pay to remove the ads, such that Rovio gained revenue from both the IAP and the ads, which shortly after the Android's release in October 2010, was estimated to be about US$42 million a month. Another game, Cut the Rope, released on both iOS and Android at the same time, followed a model of releasing a free version with a few levels, and with an in-game purchase to unlock the rest of the game. It was one of the fastest-selling games on the iOS App Store at that time according to its publisher Chillingo.

Mobile game development was also not limited to the English-speaking world, as Japan and many Asian countries had an active mobile development scene. As the app stores on iOS and Android had regional distinctions, apps developed in different regions typically would not be available in others unless translated or localized. An important region during this period is China. Separate from most other markets, the Chinese video game industry had been relatively small prior to 2008 due to poor economic conditions. The Chinese government set about trying to improve the economic welfare of the country and introduce more high technology education and jobs. However, computer costs remained high and importing consoles were difficult, so many used PC bangs, giving rise to free-to-play or subscription based games like massively multiplayer online games (MMOs). China is also recognized for creating social-network games with Happy Farm, developed by 5 Minutes in 2008, which served as direct inspiration for FarmVille.

Apple further introduced the iPad in 2010, its tablet computer based on similar design principles as the iPhone. While tablets had existed before as descendants of PDAs, the iPad was the first tablet to achieve mass-market success. Part of the iPad's success was using iOS for its operating system, assuring that all apps and games on the App Store worked for the iPad as they did for the iPhone. Android-based phone manufacturers followed suit with their own suite of Android-based tablet in the years that followed to create a similar dichotomy. Mobile game developers had a whole new audience available to them without any extra work, while others saw potential in tablet-based games due to the larger screen space that they offered. These could be geared towards children for educational purposes or elderly where hand dexterity is not as agile to use a smaller screen. Amazon developed its own Amazon Fire tablet first released in 2011 with Quanta Computer with its own customized version of Android as a means to offer digital products from its storefront to users which included apps and games.

== Candy Crush Saga and Puzzle & Dragons: Establishing the freemium model (2012–2014) ==
While casual games like Angry Birds and Cut the Rope were gaining success on mobile devices, the development of new social network sites using advanced web browser technology on personal computers, such as Facebook, gave rise to free-to-play browser games and social-network games, generally supported by ads on the hosting website. One of the most notable examples of these is Zynga's FarmVille, released in 2009. The farm management simulation game had the player work to raise crop and tend livestock on a virtual farm, but were only afforded a limited number of actions per day. Players, however, could engage their Facebook friends to ask for extra actions, and give extra actions back when requested. The "time-lapse" or "energy" gameplay mechanics was heavily criticized by traditional game designers since any reasonable progression required one to commit time to the game. However, the game was considered highly successful, with more than 80 million players by February 2010.

Zygna's success with Farmville drew gamers away from non-social browser games on portal sites. King, who ran one such portal site, was impacted by this and decided to change their own model to incorporate Facebook games that worked alongside their portal games. One of the first games King offered on this approach was Bubble Witch Saga, released in October 2011. Bubble Witch Saga used mechanics similar to the older game Puzzle Bobble, where players shot colored orbs to clear away matching orbs. However, as to avoid the drawn-out gameplay that FarmVille was noted for, King introduced the "saga" model; the game was divided into a number of levels which each was effectively a puzzle. The player had a number of turns (shots) to clear the board or meet other conditions. If they did this, they were able to continue, but otherwise they lose one "life", though these lives would regenerated in real-time, or players could ask friends on Facebook for free lives. The game thus only required the player to commit a few minutes each day. By January 2012, Bubble Witch Saga had over 10 million players and was the fastest-growing game on Facebook. King followed this with Candy Crush Saga on its portal and Facebook by April 2012, a more direct tile-matching game but using the same "saga" approach, which also enjoyed similar success.

Buoyed by the success of these games, King opted to enter the mobile game market with these titles, developing ad-supported versions for iOS that synchronized with the portal and Facebook versions; Bubble Witch Saga for mobile was released in July 2012, and Candy Crush Saga in October 2012. Both games still integrated with Facebook to ask their friends for lives, but also included an in-app purchase to fully restore one's lives or on special powerup, however, the game was still designed to be playable without having to purchase these, and 70% of the players had been able to make it to the final level of the game (as of September 2013) without spending any money. Candy Crush Saga proved to be the more popular game, and by the end of 2013, King had seen over 400 million new players of the game and their revenues had jumped from US$62 million in 2011 to US$1.88 billion from advertising revenue and in-app purchases. In June 2013, King opted to eliminate advertising in-game and simply let the mobile version of its games earn revenue from in-app purchases as they continued to release additional games. The strategy proved effective as by the final quarter of 2014, King had seen 356 million monthly unique players, with only 8.3 million spending money on their games (2.3%), but had brought in over US$23.42 per player per month, as to make over US$580 million across its game portfolio that quarter. King's success with Candy Crush Saga created the freemium model that numerous mobile games that followed used.

Separately, in Japan, developer GungHo Online Entertainment had released Puzzle & Dragons in February 2012 first in Japan, a tile-matching game with some role-playing elements that including improving one's team of "monsters". At the time of its release, one of the more popular mobile apps in Japan were card battle games, but GungHo believed they could improve on the formula. Like Candy Crush Saga, the game used regenerable "stamina" to limit how many times the player could play in a row, but could use in-app purchases to immediately restore their stamina, or obtain other forms of in-game currency. By October 2013 the game has been downloaded 20 million times in Japan (about 1/6th of the nation's population) and over a million times in North America, and was earning an estimated US$3.75 million a day. News of these numbers caused GungHo's stock market capitalization to rise sharply in October as to surpass that of Nintendo at around US$15.1 billion, and further establishing the success of the freemium model for mobile games.

In 2013, Apple was able to secure deals to distribute the iPhone cheaply in China. Because of the feature set and its relatively low cost compared to a computer, the iPhone became nearly ubiquitous for many Chinese residents. This spurred mobile game development within China particularly across the 2013-2014 period. These games followed the established freemium models from Candy Crush Saga and Puzzle & Dragons, using a mix of advertising and in-app purchases for revenue generation. Chinese publishers and developers, though limited by the type of content that they can release within the country due to the government's oversight of the media, were able to publish their games to the mobile app stores to release their titles beyond China, including to other southeast Asian countries or globally when possible, which helped to draw in additional revenue. This also led to some of the larger publishers within China, such as Tencent and Perfect World Games to establish foreign subsidiaries or acquire foreign companies to make them subsidiaries for mobile game development.

== Clash of Clans and the massively-multiplayer role-playing experience (2012−2015) ==
During this same period, Supercell released Clash of Clans in 2012. Clash of Clans is a strategy game that at its core has elements of city management and tower defense as the player oversees a fighting clan's home base. To obtain resources to maintain and upgrade the base, the player can send their forces to attack another player's base, which is handled asynchronously with the opposing player's forces managed by the computer. Should the attacking player win, they steal some resources from the losing player, while the losing player, when they next access the game, will learn of these loses. To encourage cooperation, players can join into "clans" which help to attack or defend automatically. Clash of Clan retains similar in-app purchases as with Candy Crush Saga and Puzzle & Dragons that can be used to rush certain building objectives, but also weigh heavily on social engagement similar to MMOs. By September 2014, the app was earning US$5.15 million per day, and many users had reported playing the game for thousands of hours since its launch. Supercell considered part of its success to be able to draw in both casual and hardcore games with the Clash of Clans gameplay.

Clash of Clans inspired numerous other games that gave a simulated multiplayer experience, including Game of War: Fire Age and Empires & Allies that typically required more of a time commitment and a deeper understanding of the game rules to be successful but still could be played in a casual manner.

In China, Tencent released Honor of Kings in 2015, which when it was exported to other markets, rebranded as Arena of Valor. Honor/Arena built up on the type of gameplay found in League of Legends, a multiplayer online battle arena that had been built by Riot Games, an American company which Tencent had previously acquired. Riot had believed that League could not be replicated on mobile devices, leading Tencent and its Chinese studio TiMi Studios to develop Honor of Kings. Within China the game was a success with more than 50 million daily players, and spurred its own esports league by 2016. Tencent saw the potential for its global release, but replace the game's heavy Chinese mythology with more traditional fantasy characters in rebranding it to Arena. With its international release, Honor and Arena and combined have remained one of the top-grossing mobile games overall, with over US$1.6 billion in annual revenue in 2019. And in 2020 Riot Games did make mobile versions for several of their games, with League of Legends being one of them but with a different name, Wild Rift.

== Crossy Road and the growth of the hyper-casual game (2014–2015) ==
Around early 2015, a new type of gaming app emerged on the app stores, called hyper-casual games, with Crossy Road, by Hipster Whale considered one of the key examples in this period, though earlier games like Flappy Bird by dotGears in 2013 had displayed the same principles in gameplay. Hyper-casual games differentiated themselves from the bulk of existing app games by being small and lightweight downloads, using simple graphics, and having extremely simple rulesets, but were otherwise infinitely replayable. In the case of Crossy Road, the goal is to maneuver a character as far as possible across lanes of a busy road and avoiding traffic, a type of endless game of Frogger, earning in-game coins based on distance and any collected coins picked up that can be used to unlock new characters or buy power-ups. In-app purchases also could be used to buy coins, or coins could be earned through advertising. The game's monetization scheme was designed to avoid some of the bad reputation that in-app purchasing had been getting in recent years, using the lure of new characters to get players to spend money rather than to extend gameplay sessions. Within 90 days of release, the app had earned US$10 million from over 50 million users.

Other companies soon followed to build on the hyper-casual games market, with Voodoo and Ketchapp among those releasing a new wave of hyper-casual games with similar monetization schemes as Crossy Road. Often these games were reductions of other gameplay concepts or simple expansions of more trivial games: Voodoo's Paper.io was effectively a remake of Snake and its later Hole.io a simpler version of Donut County. Hyper-casual games have continued to gain popularity, both as easier games for players to get into compared to titles like Clash of Clans, and typically are much easier and cheaper to develop, and are said to have disrupted the mobile gaming market as much as Candy Crush Saga had done when it was introduced. For established studios, the rapid development time allowed them to publish more experimental titles which they could monitor to see if players took to enjoy them, and if any title became popular, they could commit more resources and advertising to it.

== Pokémon Go and location-based gaming (2016−2017) ==
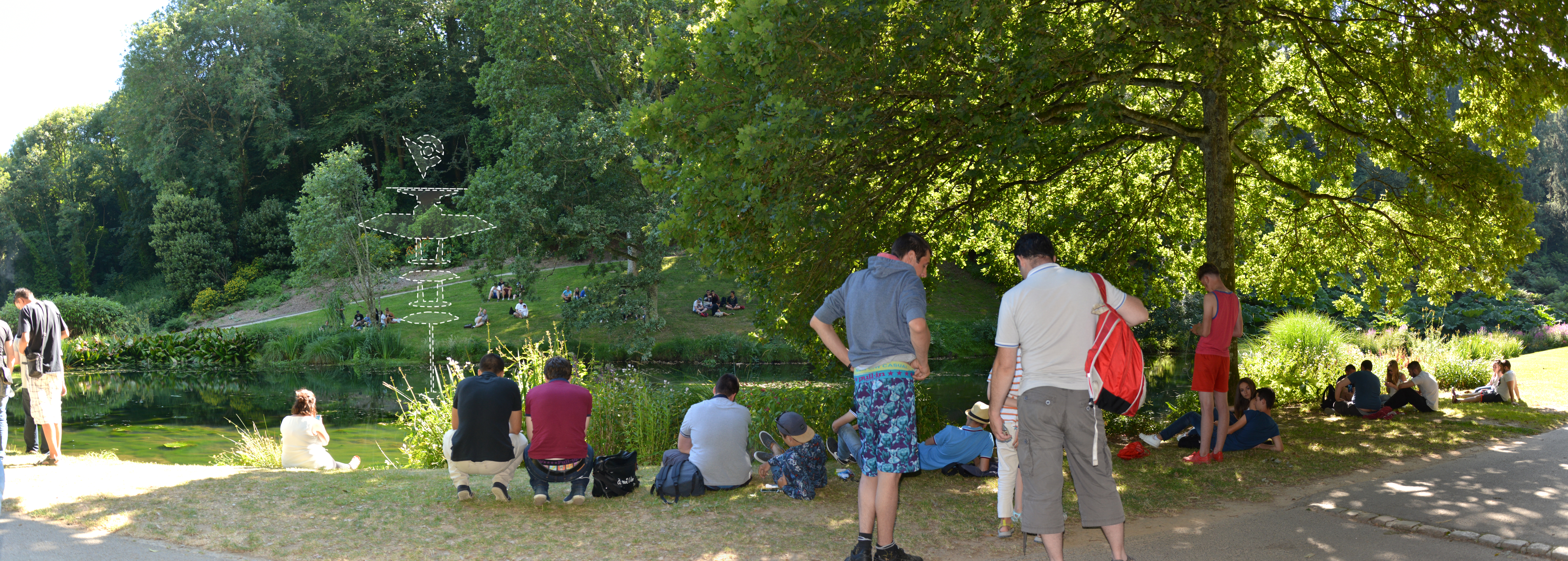
Players gathering at a virtual Pokémon gym in Brest, France while playing Pokémon Go

Under license from The Pokémon Company and Nintendo, Niantic released Pokémon Go in July 2016 as a freemium app for mobile phones. Having already had experience using location-based games with its prior Ingress title, Niantic used phones' GPS to map out nearby spots close to players where they could find and try to capture Pokémon to which they could then use at virtual local Pokémon gyms, also determined by GPS location. In game, Pokémon were shown to the player using augmented reality atop the camera's view so that the player knew they had found the Pokémon and engage in its capture. In-app purchases could be used to buy improved Pokéballs used to capture Pokémon and other powerups and items to help one's Pokémon. Pokémon Go had record-breaking numbers of players, with both its initial iOS and Android releases seeing over 100 million players worldwide within a month of release. The game was recognized by the Guinness World Records for numerous milestones by August 2016. The game was a cultural phenomena for several months, in a wave of "Pokémon Go Mania", or "Pokémania", though also led to several incidents where due to how Niantic's servers has planned out Pokémon spots and gyms, people were flocking to private homes and sites. By the end of 2017, the game has grossed over US$2 billion in revenue, and has continued to bring in more than US$1 billion each year.

While Pokémon Go was not the first location-based game released for mobile devices, it established a fundamental monetization model to make such a game work and that would engage the user in physical activity in moving to nearby local areas. It also was seen as a positive impact on social interactions since players would often interact face-to-face at the gyms. Other location-based games based on popular properties have since been released with similar gameplay and monetization models, including Harry Potter: Wizards Unite and Minecraft Earth.

Video game analysts had been watching the mobile market for several years, in part due to the growth of mobile gaming from China. Market analysis firms identified that mobile gaming global gross revenues exceeded that of either personal computer or console games for the first time in 2016, earning around US$38 billion, and remained one of the fastest growing sectors of the video game market.

== Fortnite and cross-platform play (2018–present) ==
In mid-2017, Epic Games released Fortnite, a third-person shooter with base-building elements as its Fortnite: Save the World component on personal computers in an early access model and then by September 2017 had released a standalone Fortnite Battle Royale mode, based on the success of the battle royale game genre from PlayerUnknown's Battlegrounds released earlier that year. Fortnite Battle Royale rapidly grew popular, leading Epic to port the game to other systems, including onto mobile devices by mid-2018. From the launch, the mobile versions of the games supported cross-platform play with computer and console versions, one of the first games to incorporate mobile games into direct interactive cross-platform play. By June 2018, over 125 million registered players across all platforms. Revenue, earned through the purchase of in-game currency to buy customization options and battle passes, had brought the game to reach over US$1 million in revenue daily by July 2018. A large portion of the game's audience are younger school-aged children being able to play it on their mobile phone, and parents and teachers expressed concern about the game's impact on coursework inside and out of school.

Notably, Epic Games challenged the requirement from both Apple and Google that in-game purchases had to be made through the specific storefront. In August 2020, Epic purposely released a version of Fortnite on mobile that allowed players to purchase directly from Epic. The game was pulled from both the App Store and Play Store, leading Epic to file a pair of lawsuits against Apple and Google citing that this practice was an anti-trust violation. While the lawsuit was largely decided in Apple's favor in 2021, the judge did affirm that Apple's anti-steering policy which prevented apps from informing users of alternate pay schemes violated various laws and required the company to allow apps to notify users of such systems.

== Game subscription services, cloud gaming, and popular players ==
Apple introduced the Apple Arcade in September 2019 which worked with its iOS, macOS, and Apple TV. Comparable to Xbox Game Pass, users pay a flat monthly fee to gain access to a number of curated games, with new games added to the service periodica11y while other games are removed over time. Games on the service lack in-game purchase options or advertisements, but allow the user to purchase the game to keep to own, as well as store progress through their iCloud account if they purchase the game at a later time. Thus, games on the Apple Arcade tended to be those that resembled more traditional premium-priced games that were not built on microtransactions. Google followed suit with its own Google Play Pass, launched in the same month, but which also extended to general apps as well as games.

Separately, both Microsoft and Google have been developing cloud gaming services in Xbox Game Pass cloud gaming and Stadia that would allow console-quality games to be run and played on other devices included mobile phones. Currently, due to restrictions Apple has on iOS applications, these cloud streaming services are only targeted at Android phones and devices.

The COVID-19 pandemic in 2019 and 2020 caused many people around the globe to be quarantined or forced to stay at home to prevent transmission of the virus, and video games became a popular pastime. Mobile game saw a significant boost in revenues as a result of the pandemic, with a 40% increase year-to-year in the second quarter of 2020 according to Sensor Tower. Mobile-friendly games such as Among Us and Genshin Impact, alongside Fortnite and other mobile titles, saw large player counts during the pandemic period.

Through most of mobile gaming's history, mobile game publishers have come from new publishers created in that space, such as Chillingo and Glu Mobile or from the developers themselves such as for Rovio and King, rather than through large AAA publishers such as Electronic Arts, Activision, Ubisoft, and Take-Two Interactive. As mobile provided to be a viable space, these AAA publishers started adapting to the model, either becoming mobile publishers themselves and acquiring studios, or acquiring mobile publishers, but these were still generally seen as secondary business models relative to their computer and console games. Ubisoft was the first major AAA publisher to commit to wane off computer and console games and put a stronger focus on mobile gaming in a 2021 investor report, with plans to transition to this approach by their 2023 fiscal year.

== See also ==
- History of arcade games
- History of online games
- History of video games
- List of most-played mobile games by player count
