= Super Potato =

Japanese video game store chain

- Official Japanese logo
- Type: Store chain
- Industry: Video games
- Headquarters: Tokyo, Japan
- Area served: Japan
- Website: Superpotato.com

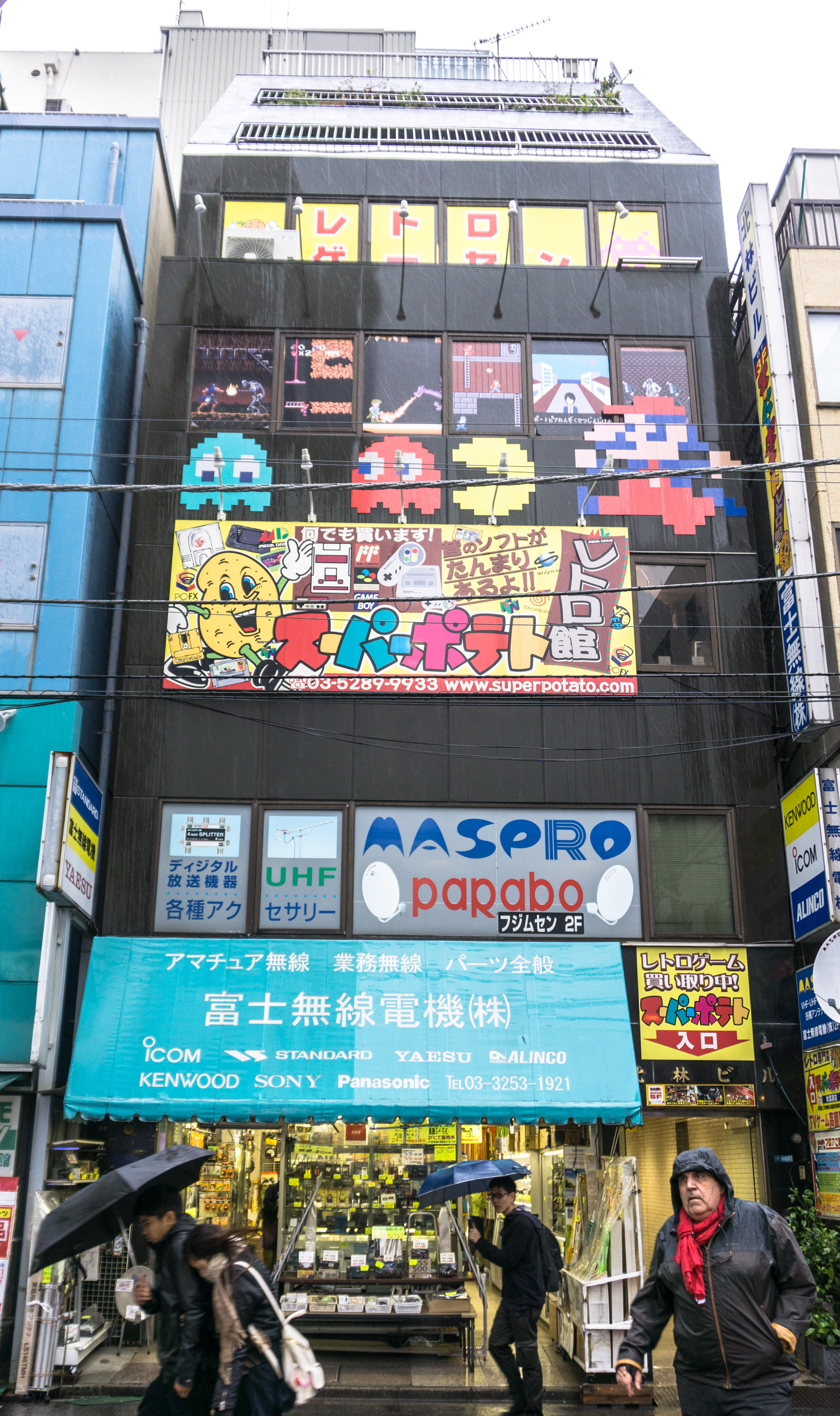
Akihabara storefront

360º view of the store's first floor

Super Potato (Japanese: スーパーポテト, Hepburn: Sūpā Poteto) is a Japanese video game store known for its collection of retro video games.

== Description ==
The main store is in Akihabara, Tokyo, a district known for its video game, anime, and manga retail business. There is a second Tokyo location in Higashiikebukuro. Outside of Tokyo, another location is found in Nipponbashi, Osaka. In total, there are six locations.

While the store carries game culture-related paraphernalia, the flagship three-floor store is dedicated to rare Japanese games from older consoles. The first floor hosts the store's Nintendo Famicom and Japanese home PC games (MSX 2, etc.), while the second houses games for more modern consoles: the Nintendo 64, PlayStation, Sega Saturn, and other consoles and handheld games from that era. Super Potato added its third floor, a small video arcade, in 2007. Games journalists were particularly fond of Super Potato's Famicom collection.

Kat Bailey of USgamer described Super Potato as "a museum as much as a shop" based on how visitors serendipitously interact with the games on display, as opposed to the deliberate choice of downloading a game at home. She predicted that the store would become more significant as retrogaming increases in popularity. Wired described the store as "legendary".
