= Air Inferno =

1990 video game

- Arcade flyer
- Developer: Taito
- Publisher: Taito
- Designers: Tsukasa Fujita; Toshiaki Tsukano
- Platform: Arcade
- Release: JP: June 1990; EU: July 1990; NA: August 6, 1990
- Genre: Flight simulator
- Mode: Single-player
- Arcade system: Taito Air System

Air Inferno (Note: Japanese: エアインフェルノ, Hepburn: Ea Inferuno) is a 1990 flight simulation video game developed and published by Taito for arcades. A spin-off from Taito's Landing series, Air Inferno is an aerial firefighting simulation that involves piloting a helicopter on various rescue missions, shooting a fire extinguisher to extinguish flames while rescuing civilians.

Like its predecessor Top Landing (1988), Air Inferno uses flat-shaded, 3D polygon graphics. Both games run on the Taito Air System hardware which uses 68000 (12 MHz) and Z80 (4 MHz) microprocessors as CPU and a TMS320C25 (24 MHz) digital signal processor as GPU. The game comes in two types of arcade cabinets: a deluxe motion simulator cockpit cabinet and a standard cockpit cabinet.

== Reception ==
In Japan, Game Machine listed Air Inferno on their August 1, 1990 issue as being the most-successful upright arcade/cockpit unit of the month.

The arcade game received positive reviews from critics. Sinclair User magazine it an 89% score, praising the "fab" 3D graphics, "realistic controls" and for being "something very different compared to the usual arcade machine." Julian Rignall rated the game 88% in Computer and Video Games magazine. Nick Kelly rated it 85% in CU Amiga. David Wilson rated it four out of five in Zero magazine, and 80% in Your Sinclair.

== See also ==
- Landing (series)
- Thunder Blade (1987)
- Steel Talons (1991)
