= Super Mega Worm =

2010 video game

- Super Mega Worm cover
- Developer: Deceased Pixel
- Publisher: Deceased Pixel
- Designers: John Tran, Josh Olmos, Ed Britton, Chau Wang
- Composer: David Schildknecht
- Platforms: Android, iOS, Mac OS X, Ouya
- Release: iOS; August 26, 2010; Mac OS X January 19, 2011; Android; July 17, 2013; Ouya; August 6, 2013
- Genre: Action
- Mode: Single player

Super Mega Worm is an action video game developed by computer game developer Deceased Pixel. The game was first released for Apple's iOS in August 2010.

In the game, players control the Great Death Worm, Wojira, who has been sent by Mother Nature to destroy the human race. As players advance through the game, their worm can grow and develop new powers. Deceased Pixel supported the game with free updates and a Christmas version of the game called Super Mega Worm vs Santa that was released on December 14, 2010. The game adopts a retro video game style in its sound design and graphics.

American DJ Diamond Del Rio also remixed the theme song for the game.

== Gameplay ==
Gameplay of Super Mega Worm

In Super Mega Worm, the player moves the worm around under the ground and makes it blast out through the surface and land on humans, animals and man made machines destroying them. To keep the worm above ground, the player can land on objects such as cars, tanks and helicopters bounce off of them up into the air. It is possible for players to bounce off many objects in a row building up combo's resulting in a higher score. For every object destroyed a multiplier is gained that will help in increasing the player's score. The worm's health decreases as the game goes on, in order to combat this the player can replenish it by eating animals that roam above ground. In order for the player to progress to the next level you have to eat a certain number of humans which increases with every level. As the player progresses through the levels, they can obtain power ups that will assist them in completing their objective, this also has the effect of enlarging the worm. The power-ups that the player gains access to consist of speed boosts, a fiery projectile that is shot from the worm's mouth and an Electromagnetic Pulse that shuts down any machines in the area around the worm.

The player can control the worm in three different ways: the first via the use of a slider, the second by tilting the iPhone, and lastly by using the D-Pad that was added in via a Patch.

The DLC that was released for the game, Mecha Worjira, allows the player to use a new playable character with a new skin and some new features, such as; no dying from hunger; infinite death beam; homing missiles; instant space jump and a special theme song. Another game was also released going by the name of Super Mega Worm Vs Santa which adds 15 levels, a boss fight with Santa, some new items, 3 new abilities and 2 new game modes.

== Development ==
Since the game was first released on August 26, 2010 it had gone through a variety of updates to improve performance and add new features.

== Release ==
Super Mega Worm was initially released for iOS on August 26, 2010. Over time it had been given many updates, which added features such as new control schemes. Originally the game could only be played with a slider along the bottom of the screen which either made the worm move up or down but now it could be controlled with an on screen D-pad or by tilting the Accelerometer. The game also supported the iPad gaming unit, the iCade. Updates also added achievements which could be tracked though Apple's Game Center, and made the game a universal app meaning it could run on both an iPhone/iPod touch or an iPad without the user having to buy two separate apps.

Deceased Pixel introduced the ‘Mecha Wojira’ paid DLC for both the original game and the Christmas edition. This paid update gave the player a more powerful worm and an extra song. The DLC was made available through the app store for $0.99.

In order to celebrate the release of their new game, Recess Riot, Deceased Pixel made the game free for a limited time during October 2012.

== Reception ==
Reception

Aggregate score
Aggregator	Score
Metacritic	74/100

Review scores
Publication	Score
GamePro	(iOS) 4.5/5
GamesMaster	(iOS) 73%
IGN	(iOS) 8/10
Pocket Gamer	(iOS) 3/5

The iOS version received "mixed or average reviews" according to the review aggregation website Metacritic. Levi Buchanan of IGN stated, "It's absolutely bizarre – the humor and WTF scenarios are truly funny – but unlike so many other weird games, Super Mega Worm is actually fun to play for more than five minutes."

Chris Reed of SlideToPlay said, "There's not much to it, but its charm and high level of ridiculousness will keep you smiling the whole way through." The website also included the game at number 34 in their list of the '50 Best iPhone games of 2010'. Andrew Podolsky called it "pure kitschy fun", while also mentioning that, "There's not much to it, but its charm and high level of ridiculousness will keep you smiling the whole way through."

Furthermore, Jon Jordan of Pocket Gamer said: "Despite some old skool charms and interesting controls, Super Mega Worm doesn't quite live up to its world conquering destructive tendencies."

The game was also recommended as an Old-School game on its Holiday Buyer's Guide of App Store Games by Joystiq.
