= Hagenuk MT-2000 =

Mobile phone released in 1994

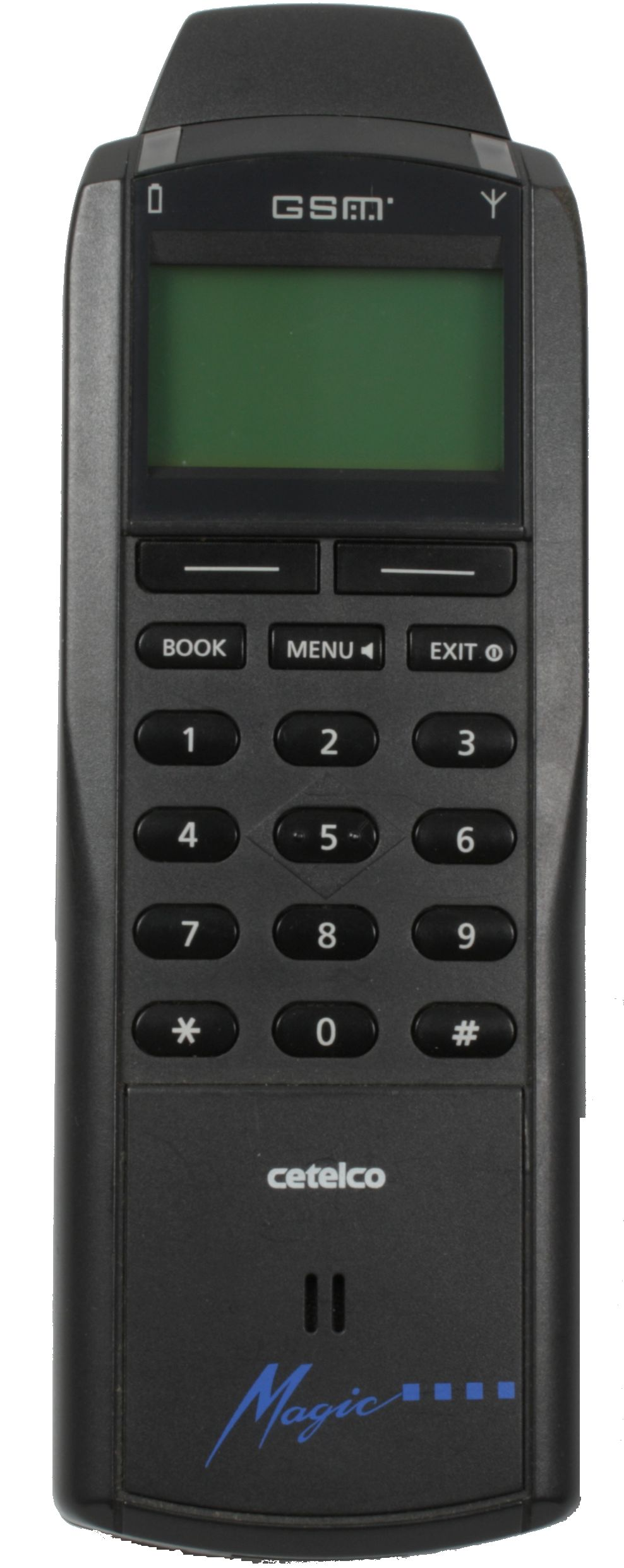
Hagenuk MT-2000 in the Cetelco variant

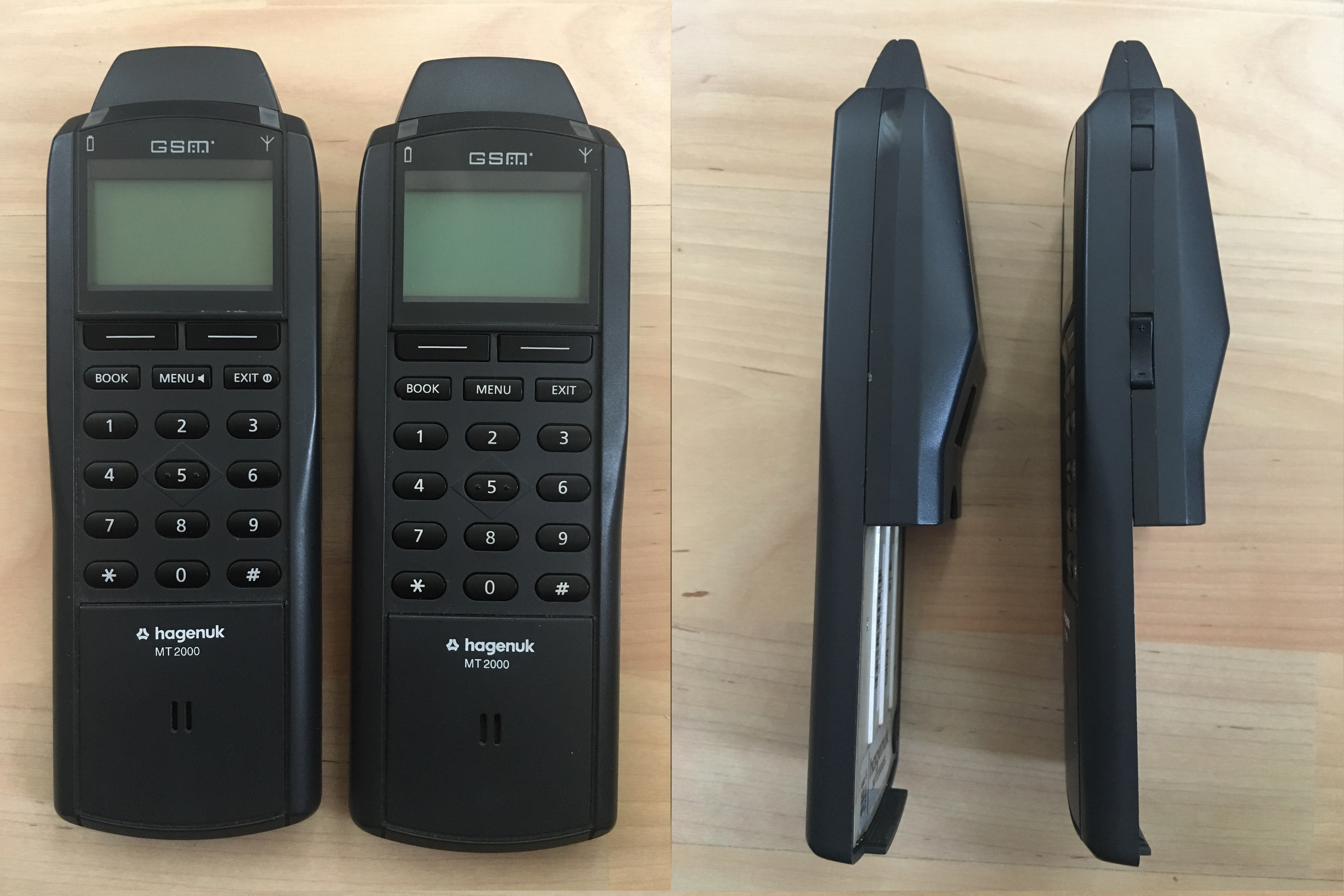
Two variants of the phone

Hagenuk MT-2000 was a mobile phone device launched in 1994. The device was designed and manufactured by Hagenuk's development centre in Støvring, Denmark. The phone was, together with its predecessor Hagenuk MT-900 from 1992, some of the first mobile phones in the industry using Soft keys. Finally, the MT-2000 was the first in the industry to have a built-in antenna, instead of the traditional extension antennas. It was believed until recently that it was the first smartphone to have installed a video game but then it turned out that it was the third one – the first two were Siemens S1 (hidden Tetris – called "Klotz" here) and the IBM Simon (Scramble) – both built in 1993 and released in 1994. There were two variants of the phone produced – with and without dedicated physical buttons for volume up and down and power on/off.

== History of Hagenuk ==
Hagenuk was one of the first developers of digital mobile games in the industry, and the development center was Cetelco in Støvring, Denmark. Cetelco had already a history in developing Analogue mobile phones. The phones were at the beginning sold in two variants, in both the name of Hagenuk and Cetelco.

Hagenuk had got in early into the GSM phone market. Their first GSM mobile, the MT-900, got it official type approval only 4 weeks after Nokia got type approval for their first GSM hand portable (the 1011) but Hagenuk beat Nokia by three years in getting a game of Tetris.

== See also ==
- Mobile game
- Soft key
