= Midnight Landing =

1987 video game

- Arcade flyer
- Developer: Taito
- Publisher: Taito
- Platform: Arcade
- Release: JP: May 1987; NA: June 1987; EU: June 1989
- Genre: Flight simulator
- Mode: Single-player

Midnight Landing (Note: Japanese: ミッドナイトランディング, Hepburn: Middonaito Randingu) is a 1987 flight simulator video game developed and published by Taito for arcades. It was released in Japan in May 1987 and in North America in June 1987 and in Europe in June 1989. It was followed by a series of sequels, as well as a spin-off Air Inferno (1990).

Hamster Corporation released the game as part of their Arcade Archives series for the Nintendo Switch and PlayStation 4, as well as their Arcade Archives 2 series for the Nintendo Switch 2, PlayStation 5 and Xbox Series X/S in October 2025.

== Gameplay ==
The player controls an airliner which is tasked to land safely at the destination airport during midnight. The game utilizes a motion simulator in a stylized cockpit-like arcade cabinet, allowing the game to provide a realistic flying experience. Wind speed and direction is taken into account by the player in order to land the plane safely. Airports available include Amsterdam Airport Schiphol, Osaka International Airport, Tokyo International Airport, Melbourne Airport, Changi Airport, New Tokyo International Airport, New Chitose Airport and Heathrow Airport.

== Reception ==
Midnight Landing was the eighth highest-grossing upright/cockpit arcade game of 1987 in Japan. It was later Japan's sixth highest-grossing dedicated arcade game of 1988.

== Sequels ==
Top Landing was released in 1988. It was the fifth highest-grossing dedicated arcade game of 1989 in Japan. It was also a success in Europe, particularly France. In North America, it topped the monthly RePlay chart for new arcade video games in August 1990. It was followed up by Landing Gear (1995) and Landing High Japan (1999).

A spin-off for consoles, Jet de Go!, was released for the PlayStation, Game Boy Color and Windows, which was followed up by the sequels, Jet de Go! 2 (2002) for the PlayStation 2 and Windows, and Jet de Go! Pocket (2005) for the PlayStation Portable.
