= Nolan North filmography =

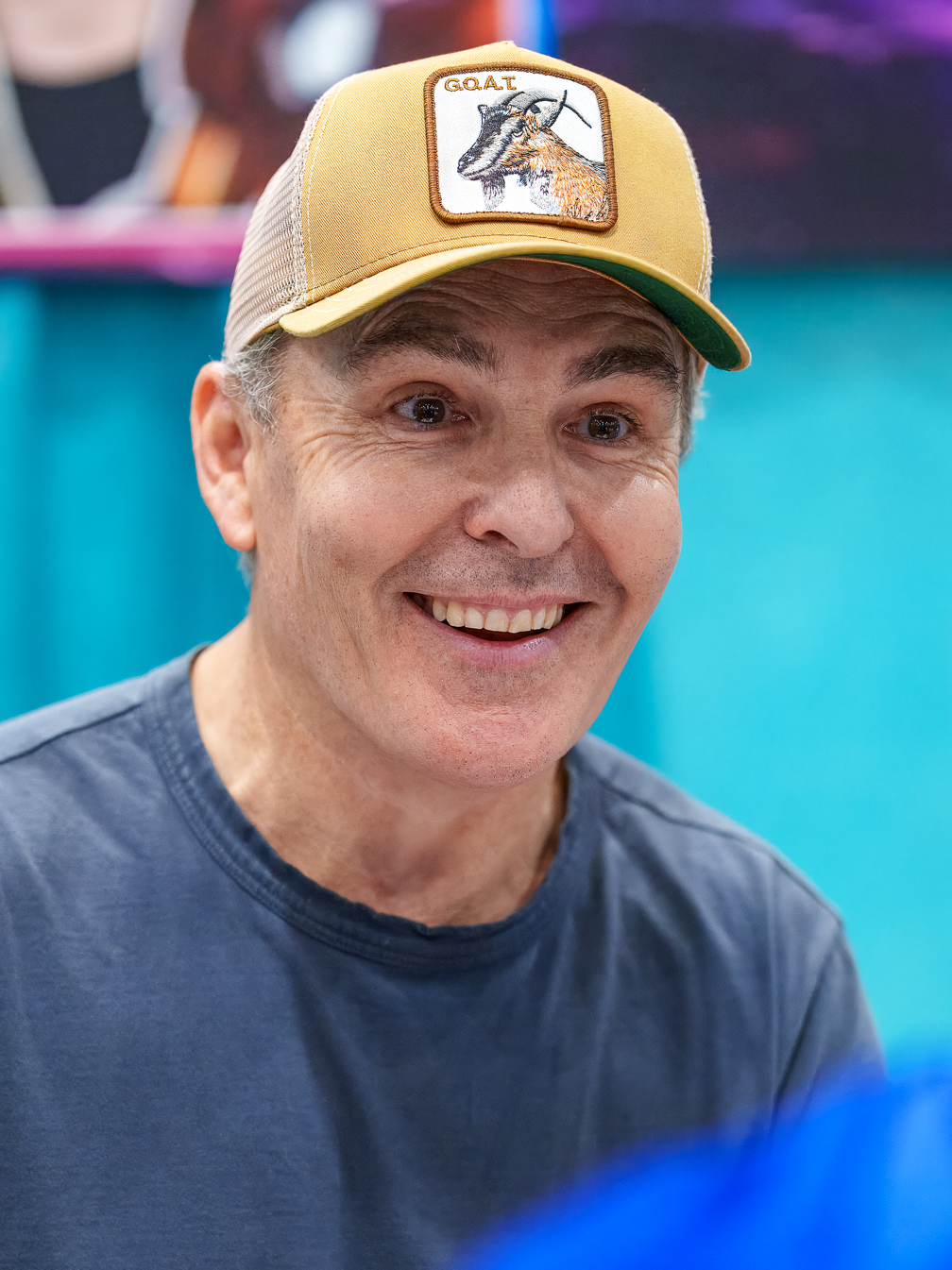
North in 2025

This is the filmography of American actor Nolan North.

== Voice acting ==
=== Film ===
Year	Title	Role	Notes	Source
2007	TMNT	Raphael / Nightwatcher		
2007	Surf's Up	Renaldo	Deleted scenes	
2008	Dr. Dolittle: Tail to the Chief	Parrot		
2012	The Outback	Hex		
2012	Back to the Sea	Farley		
2012	The Reef 2: High Tide	Bobby		
2012	Dino Time	Morris, Guard #3		
2015	The SpongeBob Movie: Sponge Out of Water	Seagull, Dead Parrot, Pigeon Cabbie		
2019	Birds of a Feather	Yusuf		
2019	The Angry Birds Movie 2	Terence		
2021	The Witcher: Nightmare of the Wolf	Vendor, Knight		

=== Direct-to-video and television films ===
Year	Title	Role	Notes	Source
2006	Ultimate Avengers	Giant-Man		
2006	Ultimate Avengers 2: Rise of the Panther	Giant-Man		
2007	Highlander: The Search for Vengeance	Marcus Octavius	English dub Credited as Zachary Samuels	
2008	Unstable Fables: 3 Pigs & a Baby	Big Bad Wolf, Eager Young Wolf, Wolf Guard		
2008	Unstable Fables: Tortoise vs. Hare	Reporters		
2008	The Goldilocks and the 3 Bears Show	Weasel, Sandy Pig, Cool Smooth Wolf		
2009	Hulk Versus	Deadpool	Appears in Hulk vs. Wolverine	
2009	Invasion of the Christmas Lights	Narrator		
2010	Justice League: Crisis on Two Earths	Green Lantern, Power Ring		
2012	Superman vs. The Elite	Pokolistani Terrorist		
2013	Transformers Prime Beast Hunters: Predacons Rising	Smokescreen, Skylynx		
2014	Batman: Assault on Arkham	Penguin		
2014	Heavenly Sword	Master Shen, Kyo, Roach		
2014	Lego DC Comics: Batman Be-Leaguered	Superman, Alfred Pennyworth		
2015	Lego DC Comics Super Heroes: Justice League vs. Bizarro League	Superman, Bizarro		
2015	Lego DC Comics Super Heroes: Justice League: Attack of the Legion of Doom	Superman		
2016	Lego DC Comics Super Heroes: Justice League: Cosmic Clash	Superman		
2016	Lego DC Comics Super Heroes: Justice League: Gotham City Breakout	Superman		
2016	Batman: The Killing Joke	Mitch		
2017	Scooby-Doo! Shaggy's Showdown	David		
2018	Death Race: Beyond Anarchy	Frankenstein		
2018	Lego DC Comics Super Heroes: The Flash	Superman, Killer Croc		
2018	Lego DC Comics Super Heroes: Aquaman – Rage of Atlantis	Superman		
2019	Scooby-Doo! and the Curse of the 13th Ghost	Asmodeus, Mortifer, Farmer Morgan		
2019	Lego DC Batman: Family Matters	Alfred Pennyworth, Killer Croc		
2020	Lego DC Shazam! Magic and Monsters	Superman, Alfred Pennyworth		
2020	Batman: Death in the Family	Superman, Police Officer		
2022	Green Lantern: Beware My Power	Hal Jordan, Pariah		
2022	Batman and Superman: Battle of the Super Sons	Jor-El		
2023	Scooby-Doo! and Krypto, Too!	Superman, The Joker, Computer		
2024	Justice League: Crisis on Infinite Earths	Hal Jordan, Amazo, Pariah		
2025	A Chuck E. Cheese Christmas	Jasper Jowls, Rooftop Driver		

=== Animation ===
Year	Title	Role	Notes	Source
2001	The Legend of Tarzan	Scox		
2006	Ben 10	Henchman, Teen Attendant	Episode: "A Small Problem"	
2006–2007	The Grim Adventures of Billy & Mandy	Exercise Dude, others	Episode: "Waking Nightmare/Beware of the Undertoad"	
2007	Back at the Barnyard	Stumpity Joe	Episode: "Animal Farmers"	
2009	Wolverine and the X-Men	Cyclops, Colossus, Pyro, Berzerker, Carl		
2009	Uncharted: Eye of Indra	Nathan Drake	Motion comic	
2010-2012	Fanboy & Chum Chum	Thorvald the Red	3 episodes	
2010	Star Wars: The Clone Wars	El-Les	Episode: "Clone Cadets"	
2010	The Avengers: Earth's Mightiest Heroes	Balder, Jimmy Woo, Living Laser, Piledriver, Scientist Supreme, Chemistro, Dispatcher, AIM Drones		
2010	Black Panther	Cyclops, Nightcrawler, Government Official		
2010–2022	Young Justice	Superboy, Superman, Zatara, Professor Ojo, Clayface, Marvin White, Baron Bedlam, Lightray, Kru-El, R'ohh K'arr, Ronal, Everyman, additional voices	Nominated – BTVA Award for Best Male Lead; Vocal Performance in a Television Series	
2011	Regular Show	Host, Centaur #2	Episode: "Party Pete"	
2011	G.I. Joe: Renegades	Snow Job	Episode: "White Out"	
2011	Scooby-Doo! Mystery Incorporated	Young Brad Chiles		
2011	Generator Rex	Dr. Branden Moses, Security Guard		
2012–2013	Transformers: Prime	Smokescreen, Troopers		
2012	Teenage Mutant Ninja Turtles	Kraang, Chrome Dome, Commander Grundch, Lunk, various voices		
2012	Robot and Monster	Crikey, Blimey, various voices		
2012–2018	DreamWorks Dragons	Stoick the Vast, various voices		
2013–2015	Ultimate Spider-Man	John Jameson / Man-Wolf, Maximus, Gorgon		
2013–2016	Sanjay and Craig	Various voices		
2013	The Legend of Korra	Southern Rebel Tribe Leader	3 episodes	
2013	Monsters vs. Aliens	Derek Dietl	Episode: "It Came from Channel 5"	
2014–2016	Breadwinners	Oonski the Great, Steven Quackberg, others		
2014–2016	TripTank	Various voices		
2014	Curious George	Hunt Official, Nilguini		
2014	Expiration Date	Soldier, Engineer		
2014–present	Rick and Morty	Scroopy Noopers, others		
2014–2025	Blaze and the Monster Machines	Blaze	Lead role	
2014–2015	Hulk and the Agents of S.M.A.S.H.	Gorgon, Maximus, Werewolf by Night	3 episodes	
2015	Pig Goat Banana Cricket	Additional Voices		
2015	Kung Fu Panda: Legends of Awesomeness	Supervisor Hong, Mill Worker, Weevil	Episode: "See No Weevil"	
2015	Fresh Beat Band of Spies	Sven Frugengeblugen	Episode: "Frozen Fresh Beats"	
2015–2017	Be Cool, Scooby-Doo!	Various voices		
2015–2017	The Mr. Peabody and Sherman Show	Marco Polo, John Sutter, Alexander Cartwright, Jesse James	5 episodes	
2016–2018	Voltron: Legendary Defender	Samuel Holt, Commander Iverson		
2016–2018	Guardians of the Galaxy	Gorgon, High Evolutionary, Jesse Alexander, Mech Leader	8 episodes	
2016–2018	Home: Adventures with Tip & Oh	Smek, various voices		
2016–2017	Avengers Assemble	Gorgon	2 episodes	
2017	Transformers: Titans Return	Metroplex	3 episodes	
2017–2019	The Lion Guard	Tamka, Nyuni, Fahari, Krud'dha		
2017–2020	Spirit Riding Free	Jim Prescott, various voices		
2018–2019	Spider-Man	Silvermane	2 episodes	
2018, 2020	Rise of the Teenage Mutant Ninja Turtles	Otter, Operator, Were-Tree	2 episodes	
2019–2021	Love, Death & Robots	Vladmir, Ugly Dave, Detective Briggs		
2019	The Epic Tales of Captain Underpants	Cash Networth / Salamangler		
2020	Glitch Techs	Argyle, Tank	Episode: "Alpha Leader"	
2020–2024	Star Trek: Lower Decks	Niko, additional voices	16 episodes	
2021	Pacific Rim: The Black	Marshall Rask		
2021	Army of the Dead: Lost Vegas	Clemenson		
2022	Exception	Lewis		
2022	Kung Fu Panda: The Dragon Knight	Rhino Guard, Boat Owner	2 episodes	
2022–2023, 2025	Transformers: EarthSpark	Swindle, Hardtop, Liege Maximo, various voices		
2023	Pluto	Adolf Haas	English dub	
2024–2025	Tomb Raider: The Legend of Lara Croft	Conrad Roth, Guest #2, De Molay, Cowboy Billionaire, Doorman	4 episodes	

=== Web series ===
Year	Title	Role	Notes	Source
2026	Chuck E. Cheese Minisodes	Jasper T. Jowls	It contains 6 PartyMobile Sing-Along videos, 5 Staring Contest videos, The Easy Dance video and 2 various music videos including "Robot Banana Christmas" and "What Would We Do Without Christmas?" from "A Chuck E. Cheese Christmas" (2025).	

=== Video games ===
Year	Title	Role	Notes	Source
1999	Interstate '82	Hinkley		
2003	The Cat in the Hat	Fish		
2004	Maximo vs. Army of Zin	Baron, Baron's Guard, Bandit		
2004	EverQuest II	Various		
2004	Ty the Tasmanian Tiger 2: Bush Rescue	Karlos, Duncan, Snappy		
2005	SWAT 4	SWAT Officer Tony "Subway" Girard		
2005	Area 51	Jack McCann		
2005	Guild Wars	Mhenlo, Palawa Joko, Olaf Olafson, Gron Fierceclaw, Mamp		
2005	God of War	Hades		
2005	Yakuza	Additional Voices	English Version	
2005	EverQuest II: Desert of Flames	Additional Voices		
2005	Evil Dead: Regeneration	Deadites		
2005	Dungeons & Dragons: Dragonshard	Additional Voices		
2005	Ty the Tasmanian Tiger 3: Night of the Quinkan	Karlos, Snappy		
2005	Crash Tag Team Racing	N. Gin		
2005	SpongeBob SquarePants: Lights, Camera, Pants!	Gill Hammerstein		
2005	Call of Duty 2	Sergeant Randall		
2005	Shrek SuperSlam	Quasimodo		
2005	Agatha Christie: And Then There Were None	Patrick Narracott, Harbormaster		
2005	The Outfit	Resistance Fighter, Allied Troops		
2005	Gun	Additional Voices		
2005	50 Cent: Bulletproof	Spinoza		
2006	Ape Escape 3	Dr. Tomoki	English (U.S.) Version	
2006	SWAT 4: The Stetchkov Syndicate	SWAT Officer Tony "Subway" Girard		
2006	Driver: Parallel Lines	The Mexican		
2006	Keepsake	Zak, Mustavio		
2006	Predator: Concrete Jungle	Additional Voices		
2006	Cars	Jeff Robertson		
2006	Pirates of the Caribbean: The Legend of Jack Sparrow	Don Carrera De La Vega, Redcoat, Captured Pirate		
2006	Saints Row	Additional Voices		
2006	Age of Empires III: The WarChiefs	George Armstrong Custer		
2006	Marvel: Ultimate Alliance	Ghost Rider, Hawkeye, Colossus		
2006	Nicktoons: Battle for Volcano Island	Crab Soldiers, Crab Refugee		
2006	Final Fantasy XII	Vossler York Azelas		
2006	SOCOM U.S. Navy SEALs: Combined Assault	Vandal		
2006	The Sopranos: Road to Respect	Additional Voices		
2007	Lost Planet: Extreme Condition	Joe		
2007	Armored Core 4	Sherring, VIP		
2007	Lost Planet: Colonies	Joe, Narrator		
2007	Agatha Christie: Murder on the Orient Express	Edward Masterman, Cyrus Hardman, Dr. Constantine		
2007	Ratchet & Clank: Size Matters	Multiplayer Voices		
2007	TMNT	Raphael		
2007	The Darkness	Young Jackie Estacado		
2007	Ratatouille	Twitch		
2007	World in Conflict	Additional Voice		
2007	Halo 3	Marines		
2007	Crash of the Titans	N. Gin, Tiny Tiger, Dingodile		
2007	Power Rangers: Super Legends	Goldar, Operation Overdrive Red Ranger		
2007	SpongeBob's Atlantis SquarePantis	Atlantean Guards		
2007	Assassin's Creed	Desmond Miles, Abbas Sofian		
2007	Uncharted: Drake's Fortune	Nathan Drake	Also motion capture	
2007	Unreal Tournament 3	Bishop		
2007	Team Fortress 2	Merasmus, the Bombinomicon, Redmond Mann, Blutarch Mann, Zepheniah Mann, Pumpkin Bomb		
2007	Nicktoons: Attack of the Toybots	Factorybots		
2007	Surf's Up	Renato		
2008	Lost Odyssey	Dark Acolyte		
2008	Destroy All Humans! Big Willy Unleashed	Trahn, Ratpoo, Corn Cob King		
2008	Dark Sector	Soldiers		
2008	Metal Gear Solid 4: Guns of the Patriots	Enemy Soldiers	English version	
2008	Too Human	Wolf Veteran #1, Valiant Leader, Wolf Trooper #2		
2008	Crash: Mind Over Mutant	Doctor N. Gin		
2008	Saints Row 2	Additional Voices		
2008	SOCOM U.S. Navy SEALs: Confrontation	Commando #2, Pilot #2		
2008	Fable II	Hero of Bowerstone (Male)		
2008	007: Quantum of Solace	Additional Voices		
2008	Valkyria Chronicles	Musaad Mayfield		
2008	Kung Fu Panda: Legendary Warriors	Baboon Goon, Gorilla Goon		
2008	CSI: New York: The Game	Bill Travers, Paul Jennings, Jamaica Zambrano		
2008	Call of Duty: World at War	Dr. Edward Richtofen, Cymbal Monkey	DLC only	
2008	Secret Service	Agent Pierce		
2008	Destroy All Humans! Path of the Furon	Emperor Meningitis		
2008	Prince of Persia	The Prince		
2008	Tak and the Guardians of Gross	Stinky Juju		
2009	Halo Wars	Sergeant John Forge		
2009	The Lord of the Rings: Conquest	Gondorian Officer, Evil Human Officer		
2009	MadWorld	Yokozuna Daisangen, Francis		
2009	Resistance: Retribution	Roland Mallery		
2009	Infamous	Civilian		
2009	The Chronicles of Riddick: Assault on Dark Athena	Guards		
2009	Terminator Salvation	Sam Dobkin		
2009	Red Faction: Guerrilla	Additional Voices		
2009	Prototype	Additional Voices		
2009	Transformers: Revenge of the Fallen	Sideswipe		
2009	Shadow Complex	Jason Fleming		
2009	Marvel: Ultimate Alliance 2	War Machine, Sentry, Officer Swanson		
2009	Halo 3: ODST	Lance Corporal Kojo "Romeo" Agu		
2009	Uncharted 2: Among Thieves	Nathan Drake	Also motion capture Nominated – VGX Award for Best Voice Actor	
2009	Marvel Super Hero Squad	War Machine		
2009	Ratchet & Clank Future: A Crack in Time	Sigmund, Nefarious Trooper		
2009	Dragon Age: Origins	Additional voices		
2009	Assassin's Creed II	Desmond Miles, Adam		
2009	The Saboteur	Crochet		
2010	Army of Two: The 40th Day	Elliot Salem		
2010	Dark Void	Will Grey, Survivors		
2010	White Knight Chronicles	Cyrus	International Edition	
2010	Supreme Commander 2	Dominic Maddox		
2010	How to Train Your Dragon	Stoick		
2010	Final Fantasy XIII	Cocoon Inhabitants		
2010	Resonance of Fate	Vashyron		
2010	Alpha Protocol	Steven Heck		
2010	Transformers: War for Cybertron	Brawl		
2010	Singularity	Cpt. James Devlin		
2010	Sniper: Ghost Warrior	O'Neil		
2010	Mafia II	Alberto Clemente		
2010	Spider-Man: Shattered Dimensions	Deadpool		
2010	Final Fantasy XIV	Additional voices		
2010	Naruto Shippuden: Ultimate Ninja Storm 2	Obito Uchiha (Tobi's Awakening)		
2010	Call of Duty: Black Ops	Dr. Edward Richtofen		
2010	Assassin's Creed: Brotherhood	Desmond Miles		
2010	Tron: Evolution	Behemoth, Sentries, Blaze		
2010	Marvel Pinball	Deadpool		
2011	Marvel vs. Capcom 3: Fate of Two Worlds	Deadpool		
2011	Knights Contract	Minukelsus		
2011	PlayStation Move Heroes	Deathbot		
2011	Portal 2	Corrupt Cores, Defective Turrets		
2011	Kung Fu Panda 2	Black Armoured Gorilla, Komodo Dragon 2, Sheep 2		
2011	SOCOM 4 U.S. Navy SEALs	James Gorman		
2011	Transformers: Dark of the Moon	Major Reynolds		
2011	White Knight Chronicles II	Cyrus		
2011	X-Men: Destiny	Cyclops, Adrian's Father		
2011	Batman: Arkham City	Penguin, Black Mask, Officer Whitman, additional voices		
2011	Uncharted 3: Drake's Deception	Nathan Drake	Also motion capture Nominated – VGX Award for Best Voice Actor; Nominated – BAFTA Games Award for Best Performer; Nominated – BTVA Award for Best Male Vocal Performance in a Video Game	
2011	The Lord of the Rings: War in the North	Eradan, Nordri		
2011	Assassin's Creed: Revelations	Desmond Miles		
2011	Ultimate Marvel vs. Capcom 3	Deadpool		
2011	Cartoon Network: Punch Time Explosion	Mojo Jojo, Scotsman, Hoss Delgado, Father, Captain K'nuckles	Grouped under "Featuring the Voice Talents Of"	
2011–present	Star Wars: The Old Republic	Jedi Consular Male		
2012	Uncharted: Golden Abyss	Nathan Drake / Jose The Parrot	Nominated – BAFTA Games Award for Best Performer	
2012	Armored Core V	Father, Men of Honor Unit A, Zodiac No. 7		
2012	Kinect Star Wars	Mak Pra		
2012	Lego Batman 2: DC Super Heroes	Scarecrow, Captain Boomerang, Hush		
2012	Spec Ops: The Line	Captain Martin Walker		
2012	The Amazing Spider-Man	Alistair Smythe		
2012	Transformers: Fall of Cybertron	Cliffjumper, Bruticus, Brawl, additional voices		
2012	Fall of the Space Core, Vol. 1	Space Core	Promotional Skyrim mod made by Valve	
2012	Guild Wars 2	Human Male Pact Commander		
2012	Skylanders: Giants	Additional voices		
2012	Team Fortress 2	Merasmus, Bombinomicon, Redmond, Blutarch, Zepheniah, Engineer (Expiration Date)		
2012	Assassin's Creed III	Desmond Miles		
2012	Lego The Lord of the Rings	Additional voices		
2012	Call of Duty: Black Ops II	Dr. Edward Richtofen, Brutus, Stanley Ferguson, Bus Driver		
2012	Call of Duty: Black Ops – Declassified	Alex Mason		
2012	PlayStation All-Stars Battle Royale	Nathan Drake		
2013	Sly Cooper: Thieves in Time	Cyrille LeParadox, El Jefe		
2013	Injustice: Gods Among Us	General Zod		
2013	Poker Night 2	Fact Core		
2013	Marvel Heroes	Deadpool, Rocket Raccoon, Tombstone, Pirate Deadpool		
2013	The Last of Us	David	Nominated – BTVA Award for Best Male Vocal Performance in a Video Game in a Supporting Role. Also motion capture	
2013	Deadpool	Deadpool, Himself	Nominated – BTVA Award for Best Male Lead Vocal Performance in a Video Game	
2013	Dota 2	Brewmaster, Earth Spirit, Gyrocopter, Keeper of the Light, Lone Druid, Lycan, Meepo, Ogre Magi, Shadow Demon, Troll Warlord		
2013	Saints Row IV	The President ("Nolan North" Voice)		
2013	Armored Core: Verdict Day	CPU Voice		
2013	Skylanders: Swap Force	Dune Bug, Mayor McBoom		
2013	Lego Marvel Super Heroes	Ant-Man, Cyclops, Deadpool, Green Goblin, Magneto, Pyro, Vulture		
2013	Assassin's Creed IV: Black Flag	Desmond Miles		
2013	Nickelodeon's Teenage Mutant Ninja Turtles	Kraang		
2013	Young Justice: Legacy	Superboy, Superman		
2014	Lightning Returns: Final Fantasy XIII	Additional voices		
2014	Titanfall	Hammond		
2014	The Amazing Spider-Man 2	Harry Osborn / Green Goblin, Kraven the Hunter	Android and iOS version	
2014	Transformers: Rise of the Dark Spark	Bruticus, Cliffjumper		
2014	Spider-Man Unlimited	Green Goblin, Oscorp Announcer		
2014	Disney Infinity 2.0	Green Goblin, Rocket Raccoon		
2014	Lego Ninjago: Nindroids	Kai		
2014	Middle-earth: Shadow of Mordor	Black Hand		
2014	Teenage Mutant Ninja Turtles: Danger of the Ooze	Kraang		
2014	Skylanders: Trap Team	Dune Bug		
2014	Lego Batman 3: Beyond Gotham	Beast Boy, Firestorm, Mad Hatter, Orion, Toyman, Condiment King, Jor-El, Bizarro		
2014	World of Warcraft: Warlords of Draenor	Lunarfall Footman		
2014	LittleBigPlanet 3	Marlon Random		
2014	How to Train Your Dragon: School of Dragons	Stoick		
2014–2015	Tales from the Borderlands	August		
2015	Saints Row: Gat out of Hell	The President (Default Voice)		
2015	Dying Light	Bernard Smith	Cuisine & Cargo DLC	
2015	Infinite Crisis	Atomic Hal Jordan, Atomic Joker		
2015	Lego Jurassic World	Dr. Lewis Dodgson, additional voices		
2015	Batman: Arkham Knight	Penguin		
2015	Hellraid	Aiden, The Cursed Kin		
2015	Disney Infinity 3.0	Rocket Raccoon, Green Goblin		
2015	Destiny: The Taken King	Ghost	Re-cast as Ghost from Peter Dinklage in Destiny, Destiny: The Dark Below, and Destiny: House of Wolves.	
2015	Skylanders: SuperChargers	Dune Bug		
2015	Guild Wars 2: Heart of Thorns	Human Male Pact Commander, Mordremoth	Expansion pack	
2015	Call of Duty: Black Ops III	Dr. Edward Richtofen, Dr. Gersh		
2015–2017	Lego Dimensions	Lord Business, General Zod, Space Core, Adventure Core, Boromir, Karlof, Superman (The Lego Batman Movie)		
2016	Teenage Mutant Ninja Turtles: Portal Power	Kraang, Ice Golem		
2016	Uncharted 4: A Thief's End	Nathan Drake	Also motion capture TGA Award for Best Performance; Nominated – BAFTA Games Award for Best Performer	
2016	Teenage Mutant Ninja Turtles: Mutants in Manhattan	Leonardo, Splinter, Shredder		
2016	Master of Orion: Conquer the Stars	Darlok Emperor, Sakkra Emperor		
2016	Destiny: Rise of Iron	Ghost		
2016	Mafia III	Remy Duvall	Voice and motion capture	
2016	Skylanders: Imaginators	Dune Bug		
2017	Halo Wars 2	Sergeant John Forge		
2017	Guardians of the Galaxy: The Telltale Series	Rocket Raccoon		
2017	XCOM 2: War of the Chosen	Chosen Hunter		
2017	Destiny 2	Ghost		
2017	Guild Wars 2: Path of Fire	Human Male Pact Commander, Palawa Joko	Expansion pack	
2017	Middle-earth: Shadow of War	Isildur, Nemesis Orcs, Humans		
2017	Destiny 2: Curse of Osiris	Ghost		
2018	God of War	Modi		
2018	Destiny 2: Warmind	Ghost		
2018	The Elder Scrolls Online: Summerset	Ritemaster Iachesis, Grand Maestro Forte	Expansion DLC	
2018	Destiny 2: Forsaken	Ghost, Cayde-6		
2018	Call of Duty: Black Ops 4	Dr. Edward Richtofen, Brutus, Stanley Ferguson, Bus Driver		
2018	Lego DC Super-Villains	Ultraman / Kent Clarkson, Bizarro		
2019	Marvel Ultimate Alliance 3: The Black Order	Deadpool, Rocket Raccoon		
2019	Freedom Finger	Major Cigar		
2019	Destiny 2: Shadowkeep	Ghost		
2020	Avengers	Tony Stark / Iron Man		
2020	Dirt 5	Bruno Durand		
2020	Assassin's Creed Valhalla	Desmond Miles		
2020	Destiny 2: Beyond Light	Ghost		
2020	Fortnite Battle Royale	Tony Stark / Iron Man	Voiced Iron Man lines featured in the Devourer of Worlds live event, which took place on December 1, 2020.	
2021	Blaze and the Monster Machines: Axle City Racers	Blaze		
2022	Destiny 2: The Witch Queen	Ghost		
2022	Guild Wars 2: End of Dragons	Human Male Pact Commander, Kippo, Mordremoth	Expansion pack	
2022	Marvel's Midnight Suns	Deadpool		
2022	High on Life	Additional Voices		
2023	Justice League: Cosmic Chaos	Superman, Clayface, Javier		
2023	Destiny 2: Lightfall	Ghost, Jisu Calerondo		
2023	DreamWorks All-Star Kart Racing	Megamind		
2024	Suicide Squad: Kill the Justice League	Penguin, Superman		
2024	Destiny 2: The Final Shape	Ghost		
2024	Teenage Mutant Ninja Turtles Arcade: Wrath of the Mutants	Chrome Dome, Kraang, Kraang Droids, Normans		
2024	Batman: Arkham Shadow	Penguin		
2024	Call of Duty: Black Ops 6	Dr. Edward Richtofen, Brutus, Cymbal Monkey		
2024	Marvel Rivals	Rocket Raccoon		
2024	Nick Jr. Party Adventure	Blaze		
2025	Rusty Rabbit	Nether		
2025	Call of Duty: Black Ops 7	Dr. Edward Richtofen, T.E.D.D. (Bus Driver)		
2026	Marvel Tokon: Fighting Souls	Deadpool, Professor X		

== Live-action ==
=== Film ===
Year	Title	Role	Notes	Source
2006	Déjà Vu	Ex-Fiancé		
2007	On the Doll	Charlie		
2008	Surfer, Dude	Mr. Simons		
2013	Star Trek Into Darkness	USS Vengeance Helmsman		
2013	I Know That Voice	Himself	Documentary	
2022	Uncharted	Hotel guest	Cameo	
2023	The Shift	Brett		
2023	Hayseed	Don Fulcher		

=== Television ===
Year	Title	Role	Notes	Source
1997–2003	Port Charles	Dr. Chris Ramsey	Series regular	
2000	Broken	Rob McCardel	Short film	
2001	Spyder Games	Dr. Horton	2 episodes	
2003	Six Feet Under	Soap Actor	2 episodes	
2004	JAG	ER Intern	Episode: "Hard Time"	
2004	She Spies	Peter	Episode: "Spies Gone Wild"	
2006	Malcolm in the Middle	Leonard Nimoy	Episode: "Hal Grieves"	
2006	Ned's Declassified School Survival Guide	Nigel Hatorff, Simone Moma	2 episodes	
2006	NCIS	Officer Lou Giotti	Episode: "Faking It"	
2007	Ugly Betty	Male Anchor	Episode: "Sofia's Choice"	
2007	Big Love	Joey's Lawyer	Episode: "Damage Control"	
2007	CSI: Miami	Ken Walker	Episode: "Cyber-Lebrity"	
2007	Dirty Sexy Money	Walsh	Episode: "The Game"	
2009	Modern Family	Donald Flum	Episode: "En Garde"	
2009–2010	Melrose Place	Curtis Heller	2 episodes	
2010–2017	Pretty Little Liars	Peter Hastings	28 episodes	
2012	Haven	Will Brady	Episode: "Last Goodbyes"	
2015–2017	Con Man	Jerry Lansing	Web series	
2016	Rizzoli & Isles	Phillip Dayton	2 episodes	
2024	Hysteria!	Gene Campbell	7 episodes	

=== Audiobooks ===
Year	Title	Role	Notes	Source
Uncharted: The Official Movie Novelization	2022	All characters		
