= Rytlock's Critter Rampage =

2013 video game

- Spoofed box art, depicting Rytlock Brimstone in battle with a toad
- Developer: ArenaNet
- Publisher: ArenaNet
- Designer: Delly Sartika
- Programmer: Delly Sartika
- Composer: Maclaine Diemer
- Series: Guild Wars
- Engine: Construct 2
- Platform: HTML5
- Release: April 19, 2013
- Genres: Action-adventure; Platform-adventure
- Mode: Single-player

Rytlock's Critter Rampage is a 2013 HTML5-based action-adventure game published by ArenaNet, developed and programmed by Delly Sartika. While not an official sequel to the Guild Wars series, it takes place in the same canon realm known to Guild Wars 2 players as the Super Adventure Box.

It was released worldwide on April 19, 2013 for players to experience in web browsers everywhere. It was developed using the Construct 2 game engine.

The gameplay of Rytlock's Critter Rampage focuses on exploration, the search for baubles that are used to purchase items such as potions, defeating foes, and rescuing defenseless creatures known as quaggans. The game's story takes place some time before the events of Super Adventure Box, and follows legionnaire Charr warrior Rytlock Brimstone as he goes on a rampage, destroying hostile creatures.

Rytlock's Critter Rampage was an unexpected addition to the Super Adventure Box release, and is considered by many players a prime example of ArenaNet going above and beyond with their game development and marketing strategy.

== Gameplay, graphics, and sound ==
Rytlock does battle with a giant bunny rabbit boss. The figures and icons on the top of the screen indicate his health, baubles, and treasure found.

Players control Rytlock Brimstone, a fierce Charr warrior who is a protagonist in the game Guild Wars 2. The goal is to explore and survive the game world while collecting baubles and treasures. Combat includes many foes, Guild Wars 2 players will recognize from Super Adventure Box, such as snakes, turtles, beedogs, rabbits and monkeys which can all be dealt with using Rytlock's kick attack. Players can also rescue some friendly creatures, such as pink quaggans, which act as savepoints, and purchase items like potions from shopkeepers. The game also includes boss fights, which are a combination of bullet hell and platforming.

The game's graphics are designed to appear like a halfway point between a retro 8-bit NES game and a SNES game, even though the game is coded to be experienced in flash. It was designed this way to make it appear as if the release of the Super Adventure Box was replacing the old fashioned SNES/NES-style gameplay with a new and mind-blowing graphic enhancements. (Similar to the way N64 was an upgrade from the SNES)

The game also features two game modes (Easy Mode or Rytlock Mode), Ten secret treasures players can find, a save feature, and four different endings.

== Development ==
The game was originally intended to be nothing more than a prop for a Guild Wars 2 advertisement video, simply making an appearance briefly before the Super Adventure Box debut in the Adventure Box promotional video. The original plan was simply to create a couple of fake sprites, but one of the developers, Delly Sartika, decided that he would in-fact take the initiative and create an entire platformer. The entire process took him about three weeks.

Rytlock's Critter Rampage was released as a free flash game and made available for everyone with internet access on April 19, 2013.
