= Guild Wars 2: End of Dragons =

Expansion pack for Guild Wars 2 released in 2022

- Developer: ArenaNet
- Publisher: NCSoft
- Composers: Maclaine Diemer; Micheal Choi; Andi Roselund; Sojin Ryu; Bryan Atkinson; Steve Pardo; Lena Raine
- Series: Guild Wars
- Platforms: Microsoft Windows, macOS
- Release: February 28, 2022
- Genre: Massively multiplayer online role-playing game
- Mode: Multiplayer

Guild Wars 2: End of Dragons is the third expansion pack for Guild Wars 2, a massively multiplayer online role-playing game developed by ArenaNet and published by NCSoft. It was released on Microsoft Windows on February 28, 2022, and was made available for pre-purchase on July 26, 2021.

The expansion introduces new features such as the game's first multiplayer mount: the siege turtle, a fully fledged fishing system, and a 'Jade Bot' companion, that can give the player access to additional perks. The expansion also gives players access to the southern continent of Cantha (first seen in the first game's Guild Wars Factions expansion). It also introduced four new strike missions (raid style encounters), with challenge modes.

== Story overview ==
After the events of 'The Icebrood Saga', Path of Fire's second season of Living world content, the dragon cycle that has sustained and blighted Tyria for ages is collapsing. Over two centuries ago, the Empire of the Dragon severed all bonds with central Tyria and Elona. Cantha has its own history of turmoil and triumph, reflected in ancient landmarks, enduring artistry, and modern life. The Jade Wind petrified everything it touched, devastating the southeastern coastal regions. A stone sea holds no food—but it's absorbed centuries of magic. Canthan innovators have long sought practical applications for the material now known as “dragonjade”, achieving solutions undreamed of elsewhere in the world. New innovations are on the horizon.

=== Plot summary ===
End of Dragons opens with the reappearance of the Aetherblades, a group that have not been seen since Season 1. After capturing Gorrik, the commander leads chase through the mists with Aurene which ends with a crash landing in Cantha, a region of Tyria not visited since Guild Wars Factions.

Since the events of Guild Wars Factions, the Empire of the Dragon severed all bonds with central Tyria and Elona. Cantha has its own history of turmoil and triumph, reflected in ancient landmarks, enduring artistry, and modern life. The Jade Wind petrified everything it touched, devastating the southeastern coastal regions. A stone sea holds no food—but it's absorbed centuries of magic. Canthan innovators have long sought practical applications for the material now known as “dragonjade”, achieving solutions undreamed of elsewhere in the world. New innovations are on the horizon.

The expansion story deals with the effects on the world due amount of magic that has been released upon the death of the five elder dragons, resolving many plot threads from the game's ongoing storyline. The players meet the sixth elder dragon, Soo-Won, the dragon of water, who has been cleansing and controlling the released magic, filtering it through her to create Dragonjade, and effectively stopping the planet from collapsing in on itself. The commander learns that the five other elder dragons were the offspring of Soo-won and used to be benevolent creatures; only becoming corrupt because of greed and the amount of magic they consumed. During an explosion caused by the Aetherblades, Soo-won leaves the reactor and becomes quickly corrupt with magic. The world then begins to fall apart with the combined magic of the Elder dragons, called the Draconic Void. The commander journeys through Cantha to extract the Void from Soo-won, and restart the dragon cycle.

Upon the void's extraction, Soo-Won dissipates and Aurene absorbs her magic, replacing her as the filter of magic throughout the world. The cycle of the dragons finally ends and a new era begins: the Age of Aurene.

Months later, the commander is invited to a party hosted by Rama, who has formed a new detective agency with Gorrik. Taimi calls the commander with a tip about some jade miners who have gone missing, and the group decide to investigate the case. The commander arrives at the Gyala Delve with Rama and Gorrik to question the remaining jade miners, but finds them acting strangely and violently. Yao and Chul-Moo, the Brotherhood leader, agree to help them figure out what is going on in the mine. They explore the caves and discover them to be full of demons and shadow creatures. A shape-shifting demon called the 'Ravenous Wander' who is feeding on a ley line, attacks them and makes the commander faint.

A few weeks later, the group come up with a plan to defeat the demons. The commander needs to face their past to charge a Recollector, a device created by Taimi. that can lure out and defeat the Ravenous Wanderer. They revisit some painful memories from earlier in the game to charge the recollector and start to feel more at peace with themself. Rama arms himself with an ancient Kurzick rune and practices a sealing spell to trap the wanderer. They lure it out of the ley lines, and fight it on the surface, eventually defeating the demon.

In the aftermath of the battle, Rama invites the commander, Gorrik and Taimi to a triple date with Min, a minister. At the date, the commander realizes that their emotional healing is gradual and that the pain they feels can be a reminder of how far they have come.

== Reception ==
Reception

Aggregate score
Aggregator	Score
Metacritic	83/100

It has a score of 83/100 on Metacritic. GameSpace said "A marvelous new frontier for Guild Wars 2. End of Dragons crashes into Cantha and expands Tyria with more than just a new sandbox. It delivers an astounding new adventure on a stupendous scale."
