= Titan Siege =

2016 video game

- Developer(s): Chengdu Storm Totem Studio
- Publisher(s): Gamesco
- Platform(s): Microsoft Windows
- Release: NA: 14 January 2016; Steam: January 1, 2019
- Genre(s): Massively multiplayer online role-playing game
- Mode(s): Multiplayer

Titan Siege is a free to play massively multiplayer online role-playing game developed by Chengdu Storm Totem Studio, a subsidiary of BL Tech, and published by Gamesco. The game is set in a fantasy version of the ancient civilizations of Northern Europe, Greece, and Egypt.

On January 1, 2019, it was released on Steam.

== Classes ==
There are a total of five different classes. The classes are not gender locked and each type has unique skills and equipment.

Melee Fighters

- Warrior
- Assassin

Healer

- Priest

Spellcasters

- Mage
- Voodoo Elementalist (summoner type)

== Gameplay ==
The game world of Titan Siege is a full three dimensional seamless map in which players can by travel walking, swimming or flying.

Titan Siege features both player versus environment and player versus player content. The game is notable for its large-scale weekly castle siege battles in player versus player mode. Open world free-for-all player killing is also allowed. Players can also participate in other competitive events such as Castle Siege, Guild Contest, Battle for Sarazahn, and a player versus player Arena.

Titan Siege has over 300 creatures, 15 cities, more than 300 quests, pets, and mounts.

== Reception ==
Titan Siege has received mixed reviews. Game reviewer Olivia Morin noted that Titan Siege is generally fun to play even though it lacks innovation. In his video review for Mmos.com, Omer said that the translations are often hilariously wrong but that the game is not bad for "a solid generic MMO."
