= Stan LePard =

- LePard in 2014
- Born: Stanley James LePard; 10 August 1956; Coeur d'Alene, Idaho, U.S.
- Died: 11 February 2021 (aged 64); Washington, U.S.
- Occupations: Composer; orchestrator; sound designer
- Years active: 1976–2021
- Musical career
- Genres: Classical; electronic; hip hop; video game music
- Instruments: Piano; synthesizer; saxophone

Stanley James LePard (August 10, 1956 – February 11, 2021) was an American composer, orchestrator and sound designer. He is best known for his work on the Halo and Destiny game series, as well as Guild Wars 2. In addition to games, he has also composed music and designed sounds for numerous Microsoft software products, including Encarta and Windows.

== Early life ==
LePard was born in Coeur d'Alene, Idaho. He composed piano ragtimes for his assignments in music theory classes. He received a Bachelor of Arts in Music Composition at Eastern Washington University, as well as a master's degree in Music Education at University of North Texas.

== Career ==
Starting from 1980, LePard composed for TV shows and films. One of his first projects was composing the theme song for Vintage Video Jukebox, a music video show which played soundies from the 1930s to the 1950s. During the late 1980s, LePard was part of the new wave band Secret Cinema as a keyboardist and saxophone player. He was also part of industrial band Steel Porn Rhino along with Jerry Schroeder, a fellow composer and sound designer whom he continued to collaborate with on later projects.

Around 1994, LePard started a long working relationship with Microsoft, initially doing work on various multimedia software products under the Microsoft Home line, including Encarta and 3D Movie Maker. This led to him composing the music for Hover!, a game included with Windows 95, and the first game that he composed for. He also composed the shutdown sound for Windows 98, as well as the installation music for Internet Explorer Starter Kit 3.0, which gained recognition from its later inclusion in Windows XP's out-of-box experience (OOBE), known as "Windows Welcome music", "Velkommen" or simply its file name title.wma.

LePard's first game score to use a live orchestra was Crimson Skies, released in 2000. He aimed to write music inspired by 1930s film and concert music, without being derivative of particular composers or styles. Starting with MechWarrior 4: Vengeance, released later in the same year, he also provided orchestrations for scores written by other composers, such as Duane Decker and Stephen Rippy.

From around 2012 to 2019, he contributed to the music of various events and expansions of Guild Wars 2. His first contribution was a track for the game's first Halloween event Shadow of the Mad King 2012, based on a short piano sketch by Maclaine Diemer that he transformed into a full composition. He also provided orchestration work, which Diemer has praised for relieving his anxiety over wasting the studio's budget, making sure his compositions were not "unplayable nonsense", as well as adding extra harmonic and melodic sophistication to his compositions. He also composed and orchestrated music for its expansions Heart of Thorns and Path of Fire.

== Death ==
LePard died on February 11, 2021, aged 64, following a intracerebral hemorrhage. To commemorate him, an NPC named Van Leopard and a memorial statue for him was added to Guild Wars 2 on May 11, 2021.

== Notable works ==
=== Games ===
Year	Title	Role(s)	Ref.
1995	Hover!	Music	
1996	Microsoft Golf 3.0	Music	
1997	Fighter Ace	Music	
1998	Microsoft Golf 1998 Edition	Music	
1999	King of Dragon Pass	Music	
2000	Crimson Skies	Music	
2000	MechWarrior 4: Vengeance	Orchestration	
2001	Project Gotham Racing	Menu music with Jerry Schroeder	
2002	NBA Inside Drive 2002	Music with various others	
2002	Links 2003	Orchestration	
2002	Combat Flight Simulator 3	Music	
2002	Sneakers	US version; music ("Mouse's in the House")	
2002	Age of Mythology	Orchestration	
2003	Rise of Nations	Orchestration	
2003	Crimson Skies: High Road to Revenge	Music	
2003	Links 2004	Music with Mark Roos	
2004	Rise of Nations: Thrones and Patriots	Orchestration	
2004	Van Helsing	Orchestration	
2004	Halo 2	Orchestration	
2006	Rise of Nations: Rise of Legends	Orchestration	
2006	Uno	Music	
2006	Texas Hold 'em	Music	
2006	Microsoft Flight Simulator X	Music	
2007	Aegis Wing	Music	
2007	Shadowrun	Orchestration	
2007	Hexic 2	Music with Jerry Schroeder	
2007	Halo 3	Orchestration	
2007	Age of Empires III: The Asian Dynasties	Music with Stephen Rippy	
2007	Microsoft Flight Simulator X: Acceleration	Music	
2008	Fable II Pub Games	Music	
2008	Peggle Nights	Orchestration	
2008	Too Human	Orchestration	
2009	Halo Wars	Orchestration	
2009	Halo 3: ODST	Orchestration	
2010	Toy Soldiers	Music	
2010	Halo: Reach	Music with various others; orchestration	
2011	Full House Poker	Music	
2011	CastleVille	Orchestration	
2012	Wreckateer	Music with Thomas Miller	
2012	Guild Wars 2: Shadow of the Mad King 2012	Music ("The Lunatic Court")	
2012	CityVille 2	Orchestration	
2013	Plants vs. Zombies Adventures	Music	
2013	World Series of Poker: Full House Pro	Music	
2013	Peggle 2	Music with Guy Whitmore	
2014	Guild Wars 2: Living World Season 2	Music with Maclaine Diemer and Lena Raine	
2014	Destiny	Music with various others; orchestration with Mark McKenzie	
2014	Marvel Contest of Champions	Orchestration	
2015	Destiny: The Taken King	Orchestration	
2015	Guild Wars 2: Heart of Thorns	Music ("View from the Canopy"); orchestration	
2016	Plants vs. Zombies Heroes	Sound design with various others	
2016	Destiny: Rise of Iron	Music with various others	
2017	Destiny 2	Copying with various others	
2017	Guild Wars 2: Path of Fire	Music with Maclaine Diemer, Wilbert Roget II, and Brendon Williams	
2018	BattleTech	Orchestration	
2018	Six Ages: Ride Like the Wind	Music	
2019	Destiny 2: Shadowkeep	Production assistance	
2019	Guild Wars 2: The Icebrood Saga	Music with various others	
2020	Microsoft Flight Simulator	Music with various others	
2021	Toy Soldiers HD	Music	
2024	Destiny 2: The Final Shape	Copying with various others	

=== Software ===
Year	Title	Role(s)	Ref.
1995	3D Movie Maker	Music with Ted Allen, Jerry Schroeder, and Randy Budnikas	
1995	Encarta 96	Music	
1995	Microsoft Music Central 96	Music	
1995	Microsoft Cinemania 96	Music	
1996	Internet Explorer Starter Kit 3.0	Music	
1996	Encarta 97	Music	
1996	Microsoft Cinemania 97	Music	
1996	Microsoft Bookshelf 1996–97 Edition	Music	
1997	Encarta 98	Music	
1997	Microsoft Bookshelf 98	Music	
1998	Windows 98	Shutdown sound	
1998	Encarta 99	Music	
1998	Microsoft Bookshelf 99	Music	
1999	Encarta 2000	Music	
2000	Encarta 2001	Music	
2001	Windows XP	OOBE music, reused from Internet Explorer Starter Kit 3.0	
2001	Microsoft Plus! for Windows XP	Sound design	
2001	Encarta 2002	Music	
2002	Encarta 2003	Music	
2002	Microsoft Money 2003	Music	
2003	Encarta 2004	Music	
2003	Microsoft Money 2004	Music	
2004	Encarta 2005	Music	
2005	Encarta 2006	Music	
2006	Encarta 2007	Music	
