= Mike O'Brien (game developer) =

Video game developer

- Occupations: President of ArenaNet (2000–2019); Programmer at ManaWorks (since 2019)
- Known for: ArenaNet; Guild Wars; AppleWin

Mike O'Brien is an American programmer and video game developer who was the co-founder and former president of ArenaNet, the studio that developed the Guild Wars franchise of MMORPG video games. He was named one of the most influential people in the video game industry in a 1999 PC Gamer cover story titled "Game Gods".

== Career ==
Before working in the video game industry, O'Brien programmed railroad traffic control software.

He joined Blizzard Entertainment in 1995 where he led creation of the 3D engine for Warcraft III: Reign of Chaos and Battle.net. The chat rooms, matchmaking systems, rankings, ladders and actual communication code for Battle.net were created by him. He also worked on Warcraft II: Tides of Darkness, Diablo and StarCraft.

In 2000, O'Brien left Blizzard to co-found ArenaNet. Among his reasons for leaving Blizzard were the direction of Warcraft III, and their rejection of an idea of his to turn Battle.net into a third-party game store (similar to Steam, which did not exist yet).

In early October 2019, through the official Guild Wars 2 news page, O'Brien announced his departure from ArenaNet and his intention to start a new development studio. He is currently working as a programmer at the studio ManaWorks.
