= Guild Wars 2 =

2012 video game by ArenaNet

- Developer: ArenaNet
- Publishers: WW: ArenaNet; WW: NCSoft
- Directors: Colin Johanson (2012–2016, 2021); Mike O'Brien (2016–2019); Mike Zadorojny (2019); John Taylor (2019–2021); Joshua Davis (2021–present)
- Producer: Amy Liu (2022–present)
- Designers: Colin Johanson; Eric Flannum
- Artists: Daniel Dociu; Kekai Kotaki
- Writers: Ree Soesbee; Jeff Grubb; Bobby Stein; Tom Abernathy
- Composers: Jeremy Soule; Maclaine Diemer; Lena Raine; Stan LePard
- Series: Guild Wars
- Platform: Windows
- Release: August 28, 2012
- Genre: MMORPG
- Mode: Multiplayer

Guild Wars 2 is a free-to-play, massively multiplayer online role-playing game developed by ArenaNet and published by NCSoft. Set in the fantasy world of Tyria, the core game follows the re-emergence of Destiny's Edge, a disbanded guild dedicated to fighting Elder Dragons, colossal Lovecraftian-esque entities that have seized control of Tyria in the time since the original Guild Wars (2005), a plot line that concludes in the third expansion End of Dragons (2023). The game takes place in a persistent world with a story that progresses in instanced environments.

Guild Wars 2 is the fourth major entry in the Guild Wars series and claims to be unique in the MMO genre by featuring a storyline that is responsive to player actions, something which is common in single player role-playing games but rarely seen in multiplayer ones. A dynamic event system replaces traditional questing, utilising the ripple effect to allow players to approach quests in different ways as part of a persistent world. Also of note is the combat system, which aims to be more dynamic than its predecessor by promoting synergy between professions and using the environment as a weapon, as well as reducing the complexity of the Magic-style skill system of the original game.

As a sequel to Guild Wars, Guild Wars 2 features the same lack of subscription fees that distinguished its predecessor from other commercially developed online games of the time, though until August 2015 a purchase was still required to install the game. The game sold over two million copies in its first two weeks. By August 2013, the peak player concurrency had reached 460,000. By August 2015, over 5 million copies had been sold, at which point the base game became free-to-play. By August 2021, over 16 million accounts have been created. On August 16, 2022, it was announced that Guild Wars 2 will be releasing on Steam as part of the game's 10th anniversary celebration.

Six major expansion packs have been released for the game; Heart of Thorns (2015), Path of Fire (2017), End of Dragons (2022), Secrets of the Obscure (2023), Janthir Wilds (2024), and Visions of Eternity (2025). Each expansion pack introduces new content, including new regions of the world to explore, end-game encounters and masteries, with the first three also offering new professions, elite specializations, and seasons of 'Living World'; live content updates that continue expansion storylines and bridge the gap between them. In February 2023, it was announced that future Guild Wars 2 expansions starting with Secrets of the Obscure would be adopting a new release model. Instead of releasing every two to four years with a season of Living World in between, smaller scale expansions would be released more frequently at a slightly reduced price. Additional content for these expansions will then be added through quarterly releases. In June 2026, alongside the announcement of Guild Wars 3, it was announced that the development team would be pausing Guild Wars 2 expansion development, with the intention of resuming annual expansions following the sequel's release.

== Gameplay ==
Guild Wars 2 features an extensive character creation system that allows the player to fine tune the look of their characters.

Guild Wars 2 allows a player to create a character from a combination of five races and nine professions. The five races are the humans, the charr (introduced in Prophecies), the asura and the norn (introduced in Eye of the North), and the sylvari, a race exclusive to Guild Wars 2. The professions are divided into armor classes: "scholars" with light armor, "adventurers" with medium armor, and "soldiers" with heavy armor — five of the professions make a reappearance from Guild Wars. There is no dedicated healing class as the developers felt that making it necessary for every party to have a healer was restrictive.

The race and profession of the player determines the skills they can access. Guild Wars 2, like Guild Wars, uses a skill-based combat system, whereby players must select only 10 skills from a much larger pool, introducing an element of strategy. However, unlike Guild Wars, skill slots have predefined roles: the first five are determined by player's weapon and profession, the sixth is for healing, the seventh through ninth will be skills with no defined roles that are unlocked as the game progresses, and the tenth slot will be for an "elite" skill, which is also initially locked. In a departure from the high number of skills present in Guild Wars, Guild Wars 2 will focus on quality of skills over quantity and attempt to minimize skill splits across game modes to reduce balancing complexity — one of the most common issues present in MMORPGs.

The low level cap of Guild Wars (20) was replaced with one at 80, which the developers stated struck the correct balance between allowing for character development and avoiding forcing players into the grind-based gameplay that too often accompanies a high level cap, the elimination of which was a core design principle of the original Guild Wars. Player versus environment features a scaling system that lowers the players level and stats to reflect the levels of monsters, thereby maintaining a global level of difficulty. In player versus player, a player will have access to almost all skills and items and compete at the fixed level 80, so that all players will be on a level playing field.

In addition to a small-scale, tactical combat PvP, the game features "World versus World", large scale combat taking place in a persistent world independent of the main world. Players are able to drop in and out "on the fly" and possess the ability to construct siege weapons, with rewards commensurate with their success. Guild Wars 2 offers eight crafting disciplines, allowing the player to practice two at a time, with a fee for switching. While there are basic recipes to follow, the player can experiment with different combinations of ingredients to discover new recipes. As the game is set 250 years after its predecessor, players are unable to carry over their characters. There are, however, a small number of achievements and honors earned in Guild Wars which are carried over to Guild Wars 2. The accounts of both games must be linked in order to acquire these bonuses.

The Heart of Thorns expansion introduced raids, more difficult endgame content that introduce bosses with several unique mechanics, testing a squad's coordination, damage output, positioning, as well as the player's builds. There have been several additional raid wings with multiple bosses released since, along with Strike Missions, raid-like encounters focusing on a single boss, as well as more challenging Challenge Mode encounters.

== Plot ==
=== Setting ===
Wordmark of the game

Guild Wars 2 takes place in the high fantasy world of Tyria, 250 years after the players' defeat of the Great Destroyer in the Eye of the North expansion. Five 'Elder Dragons' sleeping beneath the continent have awoken in the time since Guild Wars, causing widespread destruction to Tyria and corrupting its inhabitants. The once dominant humans of Tyria are in decline, supplanted from most of their land by natural disasters and war with the Charr, who have finally reclaimed the last vestiges of their ancestral homeland of Ascalon from the humans. To the north, the Norn, a proud race of Nordic hunters, have been forced south by the rise of Jormag, the elder dragon of ice. In the west, the technologically advanced Asura have been forced to establish permanent homes above-ground after the minions of the first dragon to awaken, Primordus, took control of the Depths of Tyria. Near the forests where the Asura make their home are the Sylvari, a new race who have appeared in Tyria in the last 25 years, unaffected by the difficulties that plague the other races but with some as yet unexplained connection to the Elder Dragons.

To the south, the continent of Cantha has been cut off by an isolationist and xenophobic political climate, which is reinforced by Zhaitan's undead navy. The continent of Elona, too, has been cut off; the only hint of its continued prosperity being the ongoing battle between the lich Palawa Joko's Mordant Crescent and Kralkatorrik, the crystal dragon in the Crystal Desert, as well as occasional spy reports from the secretive Order of Whispers. The Battle Isles have been wiped off the map entirely by the tidal wave caused by the re-emergence of the fallen kingdom of Orr, which came with the awakening of Zhaitan.

The advancement of time from Guild Wars is reflected in the changes in culture, including armor and clothing, as well as in the advancement of in-game technology and a unified common language.

=== Plot (The Elder Dragon Saga) ===
Guild Wars 2 features an expansive storyline called 'The Elder Dragon Saga', a story that is told through the first three expansions and 'Living World' seasons: replayable live content updates that continue storylines in an episodic format, bridging the gap between expansions. The Elder Dragon Saga plot line starts with the original game and concludes in the expansion End of Dragons (2022).

==== Guild Wars 2 ====
In the original game, the player character is tasked with reuniting the members of the disbanded Destiny's Edge, a multi-racial adventuring guild whose members' struggles and eventual reunion serve as a microcosmic metaphor for the larger-scale unification of the playable races and their groups into "The Pact", whose combined strength is needed to effectively combat and defeat Zhaitan, the undead Elder Dragon.

===== Living World Season 1 =====
After the defeat of the Elder Dragon Zhaitan in the game's core story, the player character meets and forms together a new group of characters to battle the enigmatic and insane Sylvari, Scarlet Briar, as she creates strange enemy groups such as the "Molten Alliance" (a team-up between evil Charr and mole-like Dredge), the "Toxic Alliance" (a combination of lizard-like Krait and a splinter group from the "Nightmare Court", a group of evil Sylvari), and the "Aetherblades", a group of steampunk sky pirates. As the player and their new group of heroes, made up of characters from each race, battle Scarlet, they also learn about her past and investigate what she could be searching for. The season culminates with Scarlet attacking the main player city of Lion's Arch, landing a giant drill known as "The Breachmaker" in the center of the city. The player and their fellow heroes fight back and kill Scarlet, but not before Lion's Arch is left in ruins, and the Breachmaker pierces a magical Ley Line, awakening a previously unknown Elder Dragon, Mordremoth; the jungle dragon.

===== Living World Season 2 =====
Season 2 of the Living World picks up where Season 1 left off, sending the player towards the Maguuma Wastes to battle Mordremoth with the help of their fellow heroes and Destiny's Edge. The season begins with the unexpected explosion and crash landing of the "Zephyr Sanctum", a group of airships populated by the "Zephyrites", followers of Kralkatorrik's deceased dragon champion and daughter, Glint, who had escaped from his control and had tried to help Destiny's Edge kill him before the events of the game (see tie in novel, "Guild Wars 2: Destiny's Edge"). The player and their allies follow Scarlet Briar's path into Dry Top, a region to the west, and learn about the Elder Dragons and the motivations for her destructive conquest in Season 1. The player also learns that Zephyrites were transporting an egg laid by Glint before her death and go in search of it. At the end of the season, the Pact prepare once again to battle an Elder Dragon. However, while the player continues to hunt down Glint's Egg and learns that the Sylvari race are in fact minions of the Jungle dragon, the Pact fleet is destroyed over the jungle by a devastating attack by Mordremoth.

==== Guild Wars 2: Heart of Thorns ====
Following the events of Season 2, the entire pact fleet is in ruins and burning, strewn all over the heart of the Maguuma Jungle. The Jungle Dragon, Mordremoth begins to send its minions, the Mordrem, forth to establish its hold on Tyria—and to bring the Sylvari race under its control. The pact commander journeys through the jungle picking up the pieces, locating their missing allies, exploring and meeting different factions in the jungle and mastering new skills to use for their advantage. During the story the commander also continues their hunt for Glint's egg, which was taken by Caithe. Whilst doing so they discover a hidden golden city, Tarir, built after the events of Eye of the North to incubate and protect Glint's offspring. After catching up and reconciling with Caithe, the egg is then left there, guarded by the city's inhabitants, the Exalted. At the end of the expansion, the pact commander enters Mordremoth's mind and destroys him from the inside, and as a result, his magic is dispersed across Tyria, some being absorbed by Glint's egg in Tarir.

Raids are introduced with Heart of Thorns which tell optional side stories, some of which lead into future releases.

Heart of Thorns introduces raids, which together form their own optional side-story, leading into the story of Living World Season 3.

===== Living World Season 3 =====
Living World Season 3 is the third instalment of the Living World, picking up a year after the Guild Wars 2: Heart of Thorns story left off. The story deals with the aftermath of the expansion story, the effects of the death of two Elder dragons on the planet, a political coup and Human civil war, and the return of Lazarus the Dire, a member of the thought-to-be-extinct antagonistic race, the Mursaat. During the season, Glint's Egg also hatches into a baby dragon, Aurene, Glint's daughter. It is revealed towards the end of the season that Lazarus is in fact the human god, Balthazar, in disguise. He has turned rogue and returned to Tyria to destroy the rest of the Elder Dragons and take their power for his own, an act that would rip Tyria apart.

==== Guild Wars 2: Path of Fire ====
Following the events of Living World Season 3, the pact commander has thwarted the first stage of Balthazar's catastrophic plan to destroy the Elder Dragons and absorb their power—but now he's raised a zealous army to cut a path of terror and destruction across the south, through the Crystal Desert. While humanity struggles with the sudden return of one of their patron gods, the Pact Commander travels to the desert, chasing after Balthazar to stop him before the god's ruthless crusade can upset the delicate balance of magic in Tyria and lead to the end of the world. Whilst doing so, the commander tricks the undead Lich, Palawa Joko trapping him in the underworld realm of the mists. Throughout the expansion the commander discovers more of Glint's secrets, such as Aurene's true purpose to replace the Elder Dragons and control their magic. At the end of the expansion, together Aurene and the Commander kill Balthazar.

The death of the god causes a massive release of magical energy, most of which is absorbed by the Elder dragon Kralkatorrik, but Aurene receives some as well. Aurene then flies off, with Kralkatorrik closely following.

===== Living World Season 4 =====
After the events of Path of Fire, the Commander and their allies must contend with the empowered Elder Dragon, Kralkarorrik threatening Elona, which remains under the thrall of Palawa Joko's Awakened army generals. After Palawa Joko is freed from his captivity in the underworld, in retaliation he launches an all-out assault on Tyria which is eventually thwarted by the pact commander. After receiving a prophecy from Aurene that only one of them can live, the commander decides that the damage Kralkatorrik is doing to the mists outweighs the potential threat to Tyria of destroying him. They then launch an offensive of the dragon, with the goal of replacing him with Aurene.

At the end of the season, Kralkatorrik defeated, Aurene manages to ascend to become an Elder Dragon and flies off, as the rest of the crew fly back to Lion's Arch, having successfully defeating another Elder Dragon.

===== The Icebrood Saga (Living World Season 5) =====
The Icebrood Saga, the fifth season of the Living World, focuses on the norn and the charr, as they defend their homelands in the Far Shiverpeaks and the Blood Legion Homelands from the threat of Jormag, the Elder Dragon of Ice and Persuasion. The saga begins with the four charr High Legions gathering in Grothmar Valley to celebrate the death of Kralkatorrik, while Jormag begins to stir in the far north. Through its promises of power, the Elder Dragon has amassed a sizable army of Icebrood. After the Charr blood legion imperator, Bangar Ruinbringer launches a mass-offensive to capture Jormag, Rytlock Brimstone, Braham, and Jhavi Jorasdottir lead the venture into the inhospitable Far Shiverpeaks to stop him, where players face eldritch abominations, learn about the history of the Spirits of the Wild, and confront Jormag themself.

During the season, Jormag tells the player of a prophecy that either they or the fire Elder Dragon Primordus must kill the other. Jormag takes Rytlock Brimstone's son, Ryland Steelcatcher, as their champion and begins attacks all over Tyria. Braham and the spirits of the wild merge as Primordus' Champion in hopes of steering the dragon directly into battle with Jormag. With both dragons primed for a clash, they are lured out to a field so that their champions and minions can battle each other. The Commander and any allies willing and able meet them on the battlefield and ensure that one side doesn't overtake the other. Eventually, both Jormag and Primordus are weakened and enraged enough that the two lunge at each other, destroying each other in the process. In the aftermath of their crash, both Braham and Ryland lose their champion status and return to normal. However, while Braham is relieved to be free of the influence, Ryland still holds a lot of anger. After a long fight with him against the Commander and both his parents, Ryland is killed and dies in Rytlock's arms.

After witnessing the clash between the two Elder Dragons, Taimi and Gorrik return to the Eye of the North, setting up a laboratory near Aurene so they could study and investigate the dragon cycle and any changes to the world from the magical fallout.

==== Guild Wars 2: End of Dragons ====
End of Dragons opens with the reappearance of the Aetherblades, a group that have not been seen since Season 1. After capturing Gorrik, the commander leads chase through the mists with Aurene which ends with a crash landing in Cantha, a region of Tyria not visited since Guild Wars Factions.

There, the Commander reunites with old allies and discovers that the mysterious Elder Dragon Soo-Won, the mother of the other five Elder Dragons, has been living beneath the waters of Cantha. Soo-Won has been filtering the world's magic to maintain its balance, while Canthan innovators have harnessed her power to create dragonjade. However, the Aetherblades, led by Ankka and formerly commanded by Mai Trin, are conducting their own experiments with dragon magic, threatening to destabilise the system.

As the Commander investigates the Aetherblades' plans, Ankka attacks Soo-Won's reactor using an extractor designed to manipulate dragon magic. The resulting disaster frees Soo-Won and unleashes the Draconic Void, a destructive force formed from the combined magic of the Elder Dragons. The Commander discovers that Soo-Won's children were once benevolent but became corrupted by their consumption of magic, and that Soo-Won has been preventing the world from collapsing under the same corruption. With the Void spreading across Tyria, the Commander must work with Canthan leaders, old friends and former enemies to develop new extractors capable of purging the corruption from Soo-Won. Their journey culminates in a battle against the Void, during which their allies face echoes of the fallen Elder Dragons before the Commander and Aurene finally defeat the threat.

With the Void defeated, Soo-Won dissipates, and Aurene absorbs her remaining magic, becoming the world's sole magical filter and ushering in the Age of Aurene. With her new role established, Aurene eventually departs to enter a deep slumber, leaving Tyria to adapt to a world without the Elder Dragons. The Commander and their allies reflect on the end of the dragon cycle and the uncertain future it leaves behind.

In the following months, the Commander returns to Cantha with Rama, Gorrik and Yao to investigate missing jade miners and strange behaviour at Gyala Delve. They discover demons and shadow creatures lurking in the mines, including a shapeshifting demon called the Ravenous Wanderer. After the initial encounter leaves the Commander shaken, the group devises a plan to defeat it using a device created by Taimi. The Commander revisits painful memories to power the device and begins to find peace with their past, realising that healing takes time and that pain can serve as a reminder of how far they have come.

=== Plot (Astral Ward Saga) ===
==== Secrets of the Obscure ====
Secrets of the Obscure begins after the mysterious Wizard’s Tower disappears from the skies above Garenhoff. The Commander encounters the Kryptis, a race of demons from the realm of Nayos commanded by their leader, Cerus, who are attempting to invade Tyria through magical rifts. They are rescued by Zojja and the secretive Astral Ward, an ancient organisation that protects Tyria from other worldly threats alongside the Wizard’s Court. The Commander joins their fight, using a device called the Heart of the Obscure to close rifts and repel the invaders, while discovering that the Kryptis are led by the tyrannical Midnight King, Eparch.

The Commander helps the Astral Ward search for the missing wizards, including the high wizard Isgarren, the Court’s leader, and Dagda. They discover that Peitha, a Kryptis noblewoman and sister of Cerus, is secretly opposing Eparch and seeks the Commander’s help. After fighting Cerus and helping defend Amnytas, the floating sanctuary of the wizards, the Commander agrees to join Peitha in Nayos. There, they help her gather allies, rescue survivors and rally Kryptis rebels against Eparch and his queen, Labris. The conflict reveals the extent of Eparch’s cruelty, as he consumes his own people to increase his power and seeks to conquer other realms.

The Commander and Peitha lead the rebellion against Eparch, weakening his forces and eventually confronting him at his stronghold. With the combined strength of the Astral Ward and the Kryptis rebels, they defeat the Midnight King. Eparch asks Peitha to consume his life force and inherit his power, but she refuses, killing him instead and choosing to rule differently. Peitha becomes the new ruler of Nayos, and a peace agreement is reached between the Kryptis and the Astral Ward, ending the invasion of Tyria. The expansion concludes with the hope that this new alliance will bring lasting peace between the two realms.

==== Janthir Wilds ====
Janthir Wilds begins a few months after the defeat of Eparch, as the nations of Tyria establish the Tyrian Alliance to strengthen cooperation against future threats. The Commander, now known as the Wayfinder, travels to the dangerous wilderness of Janthir alongside Caithe and charr operative Malice Swordshadow to establish relations with the local lowland Kodan. They meet Stoic Alder and his people, gradually earning their trust while investigating mysterious strangers and unusual magical activity. The Commander also receives a homestead as a gift, providing a personal place to call home. However, their investigations uncover a growing threat: powerful titans are emerging in the region, endangering both the Kodan and the wider alliance.

The Wayfinder and their allies discover that the titans, including Greer, Decima and Ura, are connected to ancient magic and are becoming increasingly dangerous. Their attacks force the Kodan, Astral Ward and Tyrian Alliance to work together, despite tensions between the wizard Isgarren and the missing wizard Waiting Sorrow. As the conflict escalates, Poised Arrow, Stoic Alder's son, becomes personally involved, while Caithe's journey to Janthir also connects to the mysteries surrounding her Sylvari origins and the ancient Mursaat. The alliance eventually launches an expedition up Mount Balrior to confront the titans, uncovering more about their origins and the catastrophic power they possess.

The story then leads the Commander to the ruined city of Bava Nisos, where the titans' connection to Janthir's dark history becomes clearer. The group discovers lingering memories of Mabon, and confronts the legacy of the Mursaat and their White Mantle followers. Their investigation reveals that the titans are tied to the Mists and the creation of powerful beings through ancient, terrible processes. The Wayfinder and their allies venture through the Foundry of Failed Creations to free tormented spirits and sever the forces sustaining the titans.

== Chronological release timeline ==
Title	Release type	Release Name		Release date	Notes
Elder Dragon Saga
Guild Wars 2	Base Game	Launch Release		August 28, 2012	Fully free-to-play
Living World Season 1	Living World	S1E1: Flame and Frost		April 19, 2022	1 raid encounter; Originally released in 20 temporary, bi-weekly instalments between November 2012 – March 2014, later re-released through 5 replayable episodes in 2022.; Fully free-to-play
Living World Season 1	Living World	S1E2: Sky Pirates		May 24, 2022	1 raid encounter; Originally released in 20 temporary, bi-weekly instalments between November 2012 – March 2014, later re-released through 5 replayable episodes in 2022.; Fully free-to-play
Living World Season 1	Living World	S1E3: Clockwork Chaos		July 19, 2022	1 raid encounter; Originally released in 20 temporary, bi-weekly instalments between November 2012 – March 2014, later re-released through 5 replayable episodes in 2022.; Fully free-to-play
Living World Season 1	Living World	S1E4: Tower of Nightmares		September 13, 2022	1 raid encounter; Originally released in 20 temporary, bi-weekly instalments between November 2012 – March 2014, later re-released through 5 replayable episodes in 2022.; Fully free-to-play
Living World Season 1	Living World	S1E5: Battle for Lion's Arch		November 8, 2022	1 raid encounter; Originally released in 20 temporary, bi-weekly instalments between November 2012 – March 2014, later re-released through 5 replayable episodes in 2022.; Fully free-to-play
Living World Season 2	Living World	S2E1: Gates of Maguuma		July 1, 2014	Fully free-to-play
Living World Season 2	Living World	S2E2: Entanglement		July 15, 2014	Fully free-to-play
Living World Season 2	Living World	S2E3: The Dragon's Reach: Part 1		July 29, 2014	Fully free-to-play
Living World Season 2	Living World	S2E4: The Dragon's Reach: Part 2		August 12, 2014	Fully free-to-play
Living World Season 2	Living World	S2E5: Echoes of the Past		November 4, 2014	Fully free-to-play
Living World Season 2	Living World	S2E6: Tangled Paths		November 18, 2014	Fully free-to-play
Living World Season 2	Living World	S2E7: Seeds of Truth		December 2, 2014	Fully free-to-play
Living World Season 2	Living World	S2E8: Point of No Return		January 13, 2015	Fully free-to-play
Guild Wars 2: Heart of Thorns	Expansion	Launch Release		October 23, 2015	Introduces gliding; 4 raid wings (15 encounters); Purchased in a bundle with Guild Wars 2: Path of Fire
Living World Season 3	Living World	S3E1: Out of the Shadows		July 26, 2016	Included with Guild Wars 2: Heart of Thorns
Living World Season 3	Living World	S3E2: Rising Flames		September 20, 2016	Included with Guild Wars 2: Heart of Thorns
Living World Season 3	Living World	S3E3: A Crack in the Ice		November 21, 2016	Included with Guild Wars 2: Heart of Thorns
Living World Season 3	Living World	S3E4: The Head of the Snake		February 8, 2017	Included with Guild Wars 2: Heart of Thorns
Living World Season 3	Living World	S3E5: Flashpoint		May 2, 2017	Included with Guild Wars 2: Heart of Thorns
Living World Season 3	Living World	S3E6: One Path Ends		July 25, 2017	Included with Guild Wars 2: Heart of Thorns
Guild Wars 2: Path of Fire	Expansion	Launch Release		September 22, 2017	Introduces mounts (Raptor, Skimmer, Springer, Jackal, Griffon).; 3 raid wings (12 encounters); Purchased in a bundle with Guild Wars 2: Heart of Thorns
Living World Season 4	Living World	S4E1: Daybreak		November 28, 2017	2 new mounts (Roller Beetle, Skyscale); Included with Guild Wars 2: Path of Fire
Living World Season 4	Living World	S4E2: A Bug in the System		March 6, 2018	2 new mounts (Roller Beetle, Skyscale); Included with Guild Wars 2: Path of Fire
Living World Season 4	Living World	S4E3: Long Live the Lich		June 26, 2018,	2 new mounts (Roller Beetle, Skyscale); Included with Guild Wars 2: Path of Fire
Living World Season 4	Living World	S4E4: A Star to Guide Us		September 18, 2018	2 new mounts (Roller Beetle, Skyscale); Included with Guild Wars 2: Path of Fire
Living World Season 4	Living World	S4E5: All or Nothing		January 8, 2019	2 new mounts (Roller Beetle, Skyscale); Included with Guild Wars 2: Path of Fire
Living World Season 4	Living World	S4E6: War Eternal		May 14, 2019	2 new mounts (Roller Beetle, Skyscale); Included with Guild Wars 2: Path of Fire
The Icebrood Saga (Living World Season 5)	Living World	Prologue: Bound by Blood		September 17, 2019	7 raid encounters; Included with Guild Wars 2: End of Dragons
The Icebrood Saga (Living World Season 5)	Living World	S5E1: Whisper in the Dark		September 17, 2019	7 raid encounters; Included with Guild Wars 2: End of Dragons
The Icebrood Saga (Living World Season 5)	Living World	S5E2: Shadow in the Ice		January 28, 2020	7 raid encounters; Included with Guild Wars 2: End of Dragons
The Icebrood Saga (Living World Season 5)	Living World	Visions of the Past: Steel and Fire		March 17, 2020	7 raid encounters; Included with Guild Wars 2: End of Dragons
The Icebrood Saga (Living World Season 5)	Living World	S5E3: No Quarter		May 26, 2020	7 raid encounters; Included with Guild Wars 2: End of Dragons
The Icebrood Saga (Living World Season 5)	Living World	S5E4: Jormag Rising		July 28, 2020	7 raid encounters; Included with Guild Wars 2: End of Dragons
The Icebrood Saga (Living World Season 5)	Living World	S5E5: Champions	Chapter 1: Truce	November 17, 2020	7 raid encounters; Included with Guild Wars 2: End of Dragons
The Icebrood Saga (Living World Season 5)	Living World	S5E5: Champions	Chapter 2: Power	January 19, 2021	7 raid encounters; Included with Guild Wars 2: End of Dragons
The Icebrood Saga (Living World Season 5)	Living World	S5E5: Champions	Chapter 3: Balance	March 9, 2021	7 raid encounters; Included with Guild Wars 2: End of Dragons
The Icebrood Saga (Living World Season 5)	Living World	S5E5: Champions	Chapter 4: Judgement	April 27, 2021	7 raid encounters; Included with Guild Wars 2: End of Dragons
Guild Wars 2: End of Dragons	Expansion	Launch Release		February 28, 2022	Introduces fishing and skiffs; 4 raid encounters; 1 new mount (Siege Turtle)
Guild Wars 2: End of Dragons	Expansion	Release 1: What Lies Beneath		February 28, 2023	Introduces fishing and skiffs; 4 raid encounters; 1 new mount (Siege Turtle)
Guild Wars 2: End of Dragons	Expansion	Release 2: What Lies Within		May 23, 2023	Introduces fishing and skiffs; 4 raid encounters; 1 new mount (Siege Turtle)
Guild Wars 2: End of Dragons	Expansion	Interlude: Forward		June 27, 2023	Introduces fishing and skiffs; 4 raid encounters; 1 new mount (Siege Turtle)
Astral Ward Saga
Guild Wars 2: Secrets of the Obscure	Expansion	Launch Release		August 22, 2023	3 new maps; 2 raid encounters
Guild Wars 2: Secrets of the Obscure	Expansion	Release 1: Through the Veil		November 7, 2023	3 new maps; 2 raid encounters
Guild Wars 2: Secrets of the Obscure	Expansion	Release 2: The Realm of Dreams		February 27, 2024	3 new maps; 2 raid encounters
Guild Wars 2: Secrets of the Obscure	Expansion	Release 3: The Midnight King		May 21, 2024	3 new maps; 2 raid encounters
Guild Wars 2: Janthir Wilds	Expansion	Launch Release		August 20, 2024	Introduces player housing; 4 new maps; 1 raid wing (3 encounters); Overhaul of Warclaw mount
Guild Wars 2: Janthir Wilds	Expansion	Release 1: Godspawn		November 19, 2024	Introduces player housing; 4 new maps; 1 raid wing (3 encounters); Overhaul of Warclaw mount
Guild Wars 2: Janthir Wilds	Expansion	Release 2: Repentance		March 11, 2025	Introduces player housing; 4 new maps; 1 raid wing (3 encounters); Overhaul of Warclaw mount
Guild Wars 2: Janthir Wilds	Expansion	Release 3: Absolution		June 3, 2025	Introduces player housing; 4 new maps; 1 raid wing (3 encounters); Overhaul of Warclaw mount
Guild Wars 2: Visions of Eternity	Expansion	Launch Release		October 28, 2025	9 new Elite Specializations; 4 new maps; 2 raid encounters
Guild Wars 2: Visions of Eternity	Expansion	Release 1: Raids and Wardrobe		February 3, 2026	9 new Elite Specializations; 4 new maps; 2 raid encounters
Guild Wars 2: Visions of Eternity	Expansion	Release 2: The Only Way		May 12, 2026	9 new Elite Specializations; 4 new maps; 2 raid encounters
Guild Wars 2: Visions of Eternity	Expansion	Release 3: Code of Creation		September 15, 2026	9 new Elite Specializations; 4 new maps; 2 raid encounters
Post-Astral Ward Saga
Currently Untitled Seventh Expansion	Expansion			TBA (After Guild Wars 3 release)	

== Development ==
The decision to start creating Guild Wars 2 began in a design meeting for Guild Wars Utopia, back when the company was releasing campaigns on a sixth-month development cycle. The team realised that they would not be able to do everything they wanted within the constraints of the scope that they had previously defined for campaigns and the limited amount of time available to them, and at the behest of Jeff Strain, found themselves discussing how the continued addition of features and content in stand-alone campaigns was leading to more bloated tutorials and difficulty in balancing the ever-increasing number of skills. Eventually, the discussion evolved into a blueprint for an entirely new game.

Work on Guild Wars 2 began in 2007. It was announced March 27, 2007 to coincide with the announcement of the final Guild Wars expansion, which was designed to act as a bridge, in both gameplay and story terms, to Guild Wars 2. The development team abandoned the early open alpha and beta testing which they had used for the Guild Wars game. ArenaNet considered that player expectations for open beta tests of MMORPG had changed, and the beta was no longer used to test the game but to trial a nearly finished game prior to purchase. Beta tests scheduled for 2008 were cancelled to ensure Guild Wars 2 had maximum impact and appeal to these players. Guild Wars 2 uses a heavily modified version of the proprietary game engine developed for Guild Wars by ArenaNet. The modifications to the engine include real-time 3D environments, enhanced graphics and animations and the use of the Havok physics system. The developers say the engine now does justice to the game's critically acclaimed concept art, and that concept art will be integrated into the way the story is told to the player.

In August 2009, two years after the game was first announced, ArenaNet decided the game had reached a state where they were happy to show it to the public. A trailer which mixed animated concept art and in-game footage was released at Gamescom, followed by interviews expanding on the lore of the game world and information about the player races.

In November 2009, NCsoft CEO Jaeho Lee stated the game would most likely not release until 2011, but a closed beta would be made available in 2010. The Q4 2009 shareholders notes further supported this when the CEO stated that "the current development target was the end of 2010 but, Guild Wars 2 likely won't be released until 2011." A playable demo of the game was made available at Gamescom (August 19–22, 2010), Penny Arcade Expo (September 3–5, 2010) and Paris Games Week (October 27-November 1, 2010). The game was developed for Microsoft Windows with a "very small team" investigating the possibility of a console version.

ArenaNet conducted small closed alpha and beta tests in 2011. On January 23, 2012, it was announced that Guild Wars 2 will ship this year. In February, select press were invited to participate in beta testing. In March and April, the size of beta tests was increased significantly as the beta was made available to anyone who pre-purchased the game. On June 28, 2012, ArenaNet announced the game would be released on August 28, 2012, and those who prepurchased the game would be able to play on August 25.

On September 18, 2012, a beta release for the Mac OS X client for Guild Wars 2 was issued. Support for the Mac OS version of Guild Wars 2 however was subsequently withdrawn in 2021, due to the discontinued support on the Mac OS for OpenGL rendering.

=== Post-launch development ===
Release timeline
2012	Guild Wars 2
2013	Living World Season 1 (Bi-weekly updates)
2014	Living World Season 2
2015	Guild Wars 2: Heart of Thorns
2016	Living World Season 3
2017	Guild Wars 2: Path of Fire Living World Season 4
2018
2019	The Icebrood Saga (Living World Season 5)
2020
2021
2022	Guild Wars 2: End of Dragons Living World Season 1 (Re-release) Guild Wars 2 Steam Release
2023	Guild Wars 2: Secrets of the Obscure
2024	Guild Wars 2: Janthir Wilds
2025	Guild Wars 2: Visions of Eternity

Guild Wars 2 originally received content updates every two weeks, but now plans large releases every few months, with smaller patches and bug fixes between these. Content updates regularly contain new items available for purchase in the gem store, as well as offering unique events for players to engage in. Some content updates introduce new mechanics to the game, such as the addition of new dungeons or the introduction of new combat options.

In the Lost Shores content updates released on November 16, 2012, a new dungeon was added to the game. Called Fractals of the Mists, the new dungeon differs from other dungeons in the game by consisting of many smaller "mini-dungeons" called Fractals. Each fractal contains its own story and environment and must be completed in order to move on to the next randomly chosen fractal. Once three fractals are completed, a new set of fractals is unlocked that offer a greater challenge than the last. This update also introduced a new rarity level for equipment called Ascended which can be acquired through various sources, though most easily through the Fractals of the Mists dungeon.

==== Introduction of the Living World ====
The Flame and Frost: Prelude update released on January 28, 2013, introduced several new features to Guild Wars 2, including achievement laurels, guesting and new "living story" content. Achievement laurels are rewarded for earning daily and monthly achievements and may be used by players to purchase items from certain vendors such as Ascended equipment and infusions for that equipment. Guesting was introduced to allow players to temporarily play on the same server as their friends, without having to transfer their home to a new server. In conjunction with this new feature, a gem fee was added for players wishing to transfer their home to another server. The final new feature added during this update was the introduction of Living Story content. The living story in Guild Wars 2 consists of a series of events and other content that players must progress through within a certain amount of time. Once this time has passed, the story progresses and new content is unlocked while the previous content becomes unavailable, though the story's effect on the world remains. Living World content is intended to provide a continuing story thread for players to follow.

The two following content updates, Flame and Frost: The Gathering Storm and Flame and Frost: The Razing, released in February and March 2013 respectively added guild missions, introduced a new progression system for Guild Wars 2's WvW game mode, progressed the Flame and Frost living story narrative and introduced content that set up story elements for future living story narratives. Guild missions introduced the ability for guilds to earn guild merits by engaging in bounties and group puzzles Guild leaders can use merits to unlock rewards for their guild. The new WvW progressions system introduced World XP and new WvW ranks, which can be used to unlock new titles and abilities exclusive to WvW. New WvW achievements were also introduced.

The Flame and Frost: Retribution update released in April 2013 introduced a new limited availability dungeon, new guild missions, added further new WvW abilities and added new purchasable siege weapons and guild banners for WvW play. The new dungeon, Molten Weapons Facility, coincided with the final portion of the Flame and Frost living story narrative and was only available for thirteen days.

Introduced in May 2013, the next content update for Guild Wars 2 began a new living story narrative called The Secret of Southsun, which would continue later in the month with a smaller update titled Last Stand at Southsun. In addition to the new living story content, the update introduced another large set of changes to WvW, including the ability for players to set traps in WvW battlegrounds, improvements to the World XP system, improved rewards and new abilities, improvements to the matchup system and the ability for players to use special Ascended and infused equipment in WvW play.

In June 2013, two new content updates titled Dragon Bash and Sky Pirates of Tyria introduced a new living story narrative as well as several new features. These features included improvements to the PvP leaderboards, the introduction of the Authorized Shoutcaster Program, the ability for players to purchase items from the gem store as gifts for other players, a large balance update to the game's skills and traits, custom arenas for structure PvP, a new spectator mode and a new ability for players to master in WvW play.

The next update was released on July 9, 2013, titled Bazaar of the Four Winds. The largest new feature added in the update was an account-wide achievement system that allows players to unlock rewards based on how many achievement points have been earned. In addition, the update overhauled the achievement interface, introduced a new structured PvP map, and introduced a new WvW mastery.

Over the rest of 2013, the updates Cutthroat Politics, Queen's Jubilee, Clockwork Chaos, Super Adventure Box: Back to School. Tequatl Rising, Twilight Assault, Blood and Madness, Tower of Nightmares, The Nightmares Within, Fractured, and A Very Merry Wintersday were released, updating and changing many areas and game mechanics throughout the world. Many of these changes were permanent, leaving a mark on the world to show an event had occurred. Updates included redesigning a boss, adding new paths to Dungeons, and rebalancing playable classes over time.

2014 brought the end of "Season 1" of the Living Story content updates, The Origins of Madness, The Edge of the Mists, Escape from Lion's Arch, Battle for Lion's Arch, and the finale Battle for Lion's Arch: Aftermath . These updates released a new WvW map and destroyed the core city of the game's world, Lion's Arch, while setting up the story for the eventual Season 2 of the Living Story.

During the down time between Seasons 1 and 2, the April 2014 Feature Pack was released, overhauling the Trait system, the Dyes system, the Cosmetic Wardrobe system, PvP equipment, and the way server load was handled via a system called Megaservers. This created world instances for all players, regardless of their home "world", to allow the game to feel more populated. The feature pack also fixed numerous bugs and offered balance tweaks to many races and classes.

On May 20, 2014, around the time of the Chinese servers release, the update Festival of the Four Winds was released, allowing players to access content from two prior patches, Queen's Jubilee and Bazaar of the Four Winds, alongside new activities.

==== Living World Season 2 ====
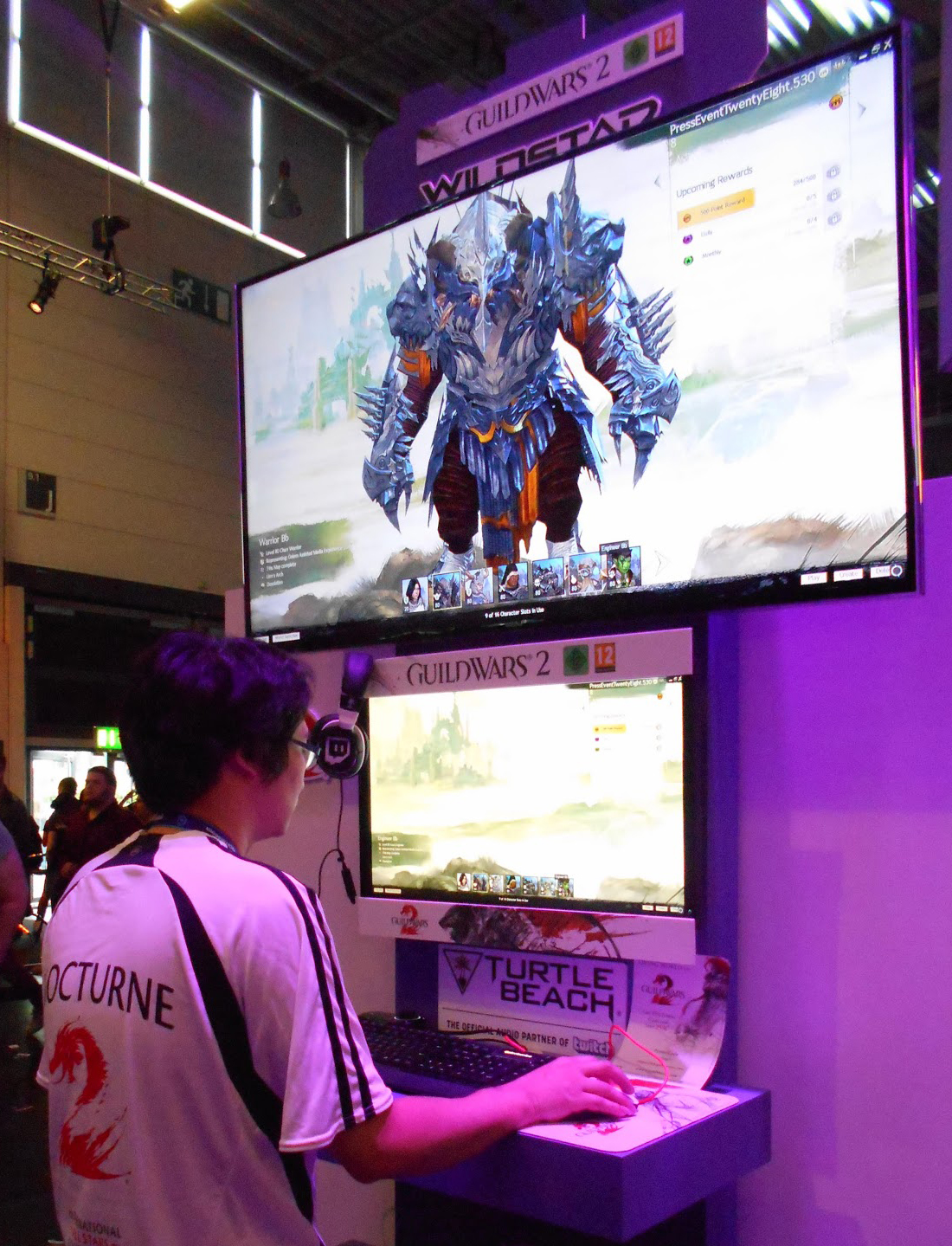
Guild Wars 2 on display at Gamescom 2014 in Cologne, Germany

On July 1, 2014, Season 2 of the Living World began with the Gates of Maguuma release, which added a portion of a new explorable area, Dry Top, and changed the way Living World releases worked, no longer making them time-gated to complete. This was followed by Entanglement on July 15, 2014, which added more explorable sections to Dry Top and added more achievements, new weaponry for players, and a new story segment.

On July 29, 2014, The Dragon's Reach: Part 1 was released. This was the first in a two-part set of releases. This updated added a few more rewards to the Dry Top zone, added a few new items and achievements, and added some new events to various zones across the game's world. On August 12, 2014, the second part, The Dragon's Reach: Part 2 was released, concluding part one of the second season of the Living Story and starting a several month hiatus on Living Story content. This update added the final new section to the Dry Top map, new rewards and events, new achievements, and game balances.

On September 9, 2014, the second Feature Pack was released, significantly changing and improving the Combat Log, the Black Lion Trading Post, and the New Player Experience, while adding a new type of Achievement called collections, adding a number of changes to the World Versus World gametype, improving the Wardrobe and miniature pets displays and making a number of rebalances and changes to the game's professions.

On October 15, 2014, the previous year's Halloween event, Blood and Madness was re-released with a few new events and rewards.

The Living World's second season continued on November 4 with the release Echoes of the Past, which included a lengthy new story segment focusing on the story of Glint and her Dragon Egg among other things, an entire brand new map called The Silverwastes which added WvW mechanics in a PvE environment and including a number of new rewards and collections included an earnable Luminescent Shoulderguard armor piece. This was followed by Tangled Paths released on November 18, 2014, which added a new story segment, a few new rewards including another Luminscent armor piece, and an underground section to the Silverwastes map.

On December 2, 2014, the seventh release in Season Two was released, called Seeds of Truth, which contained a new story instance, a large underground addition to the Silverwastes map which nearly doubled the map's size, a number of improvements to PvP and associated matchmaking, and two new Luminescent armor pieces for players to earn. This was followed on January 13, 2015, by Point of No Return, the final eighth and final episode in Season 2. This update included several new story instances, a brand new large group boss, two new Luminescent armor pieces for players to earn, and a number of new achievements, among other things. This episode serves to lead directly into the first expansion, Heart of Thorns.

=== Heart of Thorns expansion ===
On January 24, 2015, at PAX South held in San Antonio, ArenaNet announced the first expansion for the game titled Heart of Thorns. The expansion introduced new group challenges, new profession specializations, a new profession, and an account-based "mastery" system for character progression through the new territories featured in it, as well as changes to current player versus player content. It was released on October 23, 2015, to positive reviews.

With the second of the Living World seasons over and an expansion on the way, releases were smaller as teasers for the expansion were released. On January 27, 2015, a number of bug fixes and balance improvements were released. Following that, a small scale Festival was released on February 10, 2015, called the Lunar New Year. This update included a relaunch of an older activity called Dragon Ball, featuring reworked gameplay, as well as new Daily Lunar New Year achievements and new rewards.

On August 29, 2015, the base game was made free to download. The free version of the game includes some restrictions over the core game, such as fewer character slots and some chat limitations.

==== Living World Season 3 ====
The first episode of the 3rd season of the Living World was announced on July 12, 2016. Entitled Out of the Shadows, it was released on July 26, 2016, containing a new story instance and map with related achievements, a new PvP map with related achievements, a new fractal, some tweaks to the PvP and WvW game modes, and a number of balance changes.

=== Path of Fire expansion ===
Guild Wars 2: Path of Fire is the second expansion pack for Guild Wars 2. It was made available for pre-purchase on August 1, 2017, and released on September 22, 2017. The expansion introduces new features such as mounts, additional elite specializations for each profession, a bounty system for defeating certain enemies, and access to the areas of the Crystal Desert and Elona (first seen in the first game's Guild Wars Nightfall expansion). It will also introduce new raids and season four of the living world storyline.

==== Living World Season 4 ====
Living World Season 4 refers to a schedule of content updates, beginning on November 28, 2017. It continues the story of Guild Wars 2: Path of Fire, picking up immediately where the story instance Small Victory (Epilogue) left off. It included six new open world zones, new mounts, raids, fractal dungeons, as well as new PvP arenas. The story tells the consequences of the Path of Fire events and a new threat from the Elder Dragon of Crystal and Fury.

==== The Icebrood Saga ====
The Icebrood Saga is the fifth Living World series of content and story releases. It was announced at PAX West 2019 with a live presentation at Moore Theater in Seattle, Washington on August 30, 2019. Announced features included new playable zones with expansive meta-events, a new fractal dungeon, as well as new types of instanced content, Strike Missions and Dragon Response Missions. The new story chapters focus on the norn and the charr as they defend their homelands from the threat of the Elder Dragon of Ice and Persuasion.

=== End of Dragons expansion and new release format ===
The third expansion was announced on March 12, 2020. The name, Guild Wars 2: End of Dragons, and a teaser trailer were revealed on August 25, 2020. It was made available for pre-purchase on July 27, 2021, and then released on February 28, 2022. It includes a new story and maps set in the southern region of Cantha (first seen in the first game's Guild Wars Factions expansion), additional elite specializations for each profession, the first multiplayer mount, skiffs, fishing, challenging Strike Missions, as well as additional mastery types. On March 22, it was announced that End of Dragons had outsold the previous expansion Path of Fire, with the active player count more than doubling over the last three years.

In February 2023, it was announced that future Guild Wars 2 expansions and content would be adopting a new release model, with the aim of providing more support for popular game modes and making frequent quality-of-life improvements to core gameplay systems such as professions. Instead of launching an expansion every two to four years with a season of Living World in between, smaller expansions would be released more frequently at a slightly reduced price. Additional content for these expansions would then be added through quarterly updates.

The first release in the End of Dragons expansion cycle was released on February 28, 2023, exactly one year after the initial End of Dragon's release. It brought with it a new open-world map and additional story chapters.

=== Steam release ===
On August 16, 2022, it was announced that Guild Wars 2 will be releasing on Steam as part of the game's 10th anniversary celebration. Steam players are able to experience the core Guild Wars 2 game for free (with the same restrictions applied to free accounts created on GuildWars2.com), with options to upgrade to Guild Wars 2: Heart of Thorns, Guild Wars 2: Path of Fire, and Guild Wars 2: End of Dragons from day one. A separate 'Complete Collection' bundle that includes all three expansions and Living World Seasons 2 through 5 for one price was also made available. The game was released on Steam on August 23, 2022.

=== Secrets of the Obscure expansion ===
A fourth expansion alongside future 'post-End of Dragons story updates' was announced on March 22, 2022. On June 27, 2023, the name of the expansion, Secrets of the Obscure was announced. The expansion centered on the Wizard's Tower, a long-standing mystery in Guild Wars lore, and the introduction of the Wizard Court, an ancient secretive organization battling incursions of creatures from the Mists. It was released on August 22, 2023. The expansion introduced new features, such as the Relic system for character customization and two new vertical exploration zones, Skywatch Archipelago and Amnytas. Updates to gameplay mechanics included streamlined access to elite specializations and revisions to existing content like Strike Missions. ArenaNet adopted a new release model, providing smaller, regular updates to expand upon the initial launch.

Following the launch release, the game received 3 additional large additional content updates, which continued the expansion story and added an additional zone, Inner Nayos. Critics noted the expansion's emphasis on post-launch support and its integration of gameplay mechanics with narrative themes.

=== Janthir Wilds expansion ===
The fifth expansion, titled Janthir Wilds was released on August 20, 2024. It was officially revealed on June 4, 2024, and released on August 20, 2024. The expansion introduces the uncharted region of Janthir, a land steeped in the history of the Mursaat and their White Mantle followers.

Key features of the expansion include the introduction of Homesteads, a customizable player housing system, and the addition of spears as a new terrestrial weapon type for all professions. Two new open-world maps were added at launch, with additional maps and story content released in quarterly updates. The expansion also features new group content, including the first new raid wing since Guild Wars 2: Path of Fire and fractals, as well as updates to the Warclaw mount and new masteries.

=== Visions of Eternity expansion ===
A sixth expansion for Guild Wars 2 was announced on July 15, 2025, titled Visions of Eternity, set to launch on October 28, 2025. The new expansion focuses on the mysterious island of Castora, long thought to be inaccessible, and the covert operations of the Inquest seeking its secrets. The expansion features two new open-world regions at launch, with two additional maps to be released throughout the year. Visions of Eternity introduced new elite specializations for all nine professions for the first time since End of Dragons, featuring all new trait lines and mechanics, though this time without the ability to use a new weapon. The expansion also enhances the skimmer mount with updated abilities. The expansion promises a year of story chapters and three major content updates, similar in structure to previous expansions Secrets of the Obscure and Janthir Wilds.

As a part of the announcement, it was announced that in a future game update in 2026 that raids and strikes will be unified under a streamlined structure, aiming to improve accessibility of the game modes for new players.

== Reception ==
Reception

Aggregate score
Aggregator	Score
Metacritic	90/100

Review scores
Publication	Score
Computer and Video Games	8.9/10
G4	5/5
GameSpot	9.0/10
GameSpy	4.5/5
GamesRadar+	4.5/5
IGN	9/10
PC Gamer (US)	94%

Guild Wars 2 was released to universal acclaim. It received a score of 90/100 on Metacritic.

PC Gamer's Chris Thursten gave the game a 94% rating, calling it "an accomplished and rewarding online RPG that does a great deal to reclaim the promise of its genre." IGN's Charles Onyett rated the game a 9/10, commenting that the game is "one of the most exhaustively detailed and rewarding MMOs in existence, one that never unfairly penalizes and fosters an incredible urge to explore through a generous reward system and achingly pretty environment design". GameSpot's Kevin VanOrd opened his review with "Guild Wars 2 is a paradise for explorers and thrill-seekers alike, and the best online role-playing game in years" and gave the game a 9.0/10. Computer and Video Games Games Editor Andy Kelly gave a verdict of 8.9/10 closing with "An entertaining MMO that combats the dreaded grind with smart design. The lack of a monthly subscription fee only sweetens the deal." GamesRadar's Hollander Cooper wrote in his review, "Everything a massively-multiplayer online RPG should be. It's original, massive in scope, and wonderfully social, removing many of the gates that held back the genre in the past. Being able to play with friends regardless of level or class is a gigantic leap forward, and one that, when mixed in with all of the other innovations in the genre, make Guild Wars 2 one of the best MMOs currently available." and giving it 4.5/5 and GameSpy's Leif Johnson wrote, "To Guild Wars 2's credit, its issues do little to detract from the immensely rewarding experience of the whole. It doesn't overthrow the conventions of the MMORPG, but it presents them in fresher and livelier packaging than its competitors."

Time listed Guild Wars 2 as the top video game of 2012. Editor Matt Peckham noted that "Guild Wars 2 is one of those rare games that unexpectedly knocks your life off-kilter, like a meteoroid banging into a satellite"... [It has] the feel of a living world, and the sort of compulsive anywhere-you-go playability other MMOs only dream of."

During the 16th Annual D.I.C.E. Awards, the Academy of Interactive Arts & Sciences nominated Guild Wars 2 for "Role-Playing/Massively Multiplayer Game of the Year".
