= Guild Wars 3 =

Upcoming MMORPG video game

- Developer: ArenaNet
- Publisher: ArenaNet
- Series: Guild Wars
- Platforms: PlayStation 5; Windows
- Genre: MMORPG
- Mode: Multiplayer

Guild Wars 3 is an upcoming massively multiplayer online role-playing game, developed and published by ArenaNet. It is set to be the third major entry in the Guild Wars series, following Guild Wars 2 (2012). Set more than 1000 years before the original game in the fantasy world of Tyria, players join the Vaelwardens, a guild that protects the land of Orr and the people and spirits that call it home.

Guild Wars 3 will be the first game in the series to be released on both PlayStation 5 and Windows.

== Gameplay ==
ArenaNet has described Guild Wars 3 as "a modern evolution of the MMO". The gameplay is intended to build upon the series' existing open-world structure while introducing a stronger emphasis on movement. and traversal within its environments. Combat is described by developers as more action-focused and responsive than in previous entries in the series, while retaining cooperative gameplay elements. The game’s overall design has been characterised as an attempt to further integrate exploration and combat systems within a seamless open-world MMORPG structure.

== Development ==
Guild Wars 3 was developed by ArenaNet, the developer behind all games in the Guild Wars franchise. The director Colin Johanson said that whenever they made a new game in the franchise, the development team's goal was to set out and try new things so that they can push the genre forward. Early in the development, the team thought the player movement was where they could shake up in the sequel. They thought the movement in the usual MMORPGs was held back by "stop-start nature", forcing players to halt to perform actions. ArenaNet implemented seamless switching between different styles of movement, giving the player characters an ability to easily build momentum.

Guild Wars 3 was the first game in the series to be released for console platforms. ArenaNet said the development for home console ports went smoothly, but found it difficult to reinvent new controls for the consoles, as the company had only worked on computer video game during all of its operation in the past 26 years. As the game controllers had more limitations than mouses and keyboards, the developer had to rebuild the control scheme from scratch.

== Release ==
Guild Wars 3 was officially announced on June 5, 2026, at Summer Game Fest 2026. Beta access is scheduled to begin in fall 2027. According to ArenaNet, Guild Wars 3 will be a "premium" product, and that the game will not have a battle pass or a subscription service.
