= Hover! =

Video game published by Microsoft

- Opening screen
- Developer: Microsoft
- Publisher: Microsoft
- Composer: Stan LePard
- Platform: Microsoft Windows
- Release: August 1995; 31 years ago
- Genres: Bumper cars, capture the flag
- Mode: Single-player

Hover! is a video game that combines elements of the games bumper cars and capture the flag. It was included on CD-ROM versions of the Microsoft Windows 95 operating system. It was a showcase for the advanced multimedia capabilities available on personal computers at the time. It was not included with later versions of Windows, but still works on modern Windows. The game will not run on early Windows NT systems or Windows versions prior to Windows 95. It was officially remade in 2013 as a browser game to showcase the WebGL support in Internet Explorer 11.

== Gameplay ==
Gameplay screenshot showing the first map

Hover! has three mazes that resemble a medieval castle, a futuristic city, and a sewer. Each maze has its own unique texture maps, music theme, and spawn locations.

For each level, Hover! will cycle through each of the three mazes, or randomly select one (if that option is set). The goal of each level is to capture all of the blue flags hidden throughout the level (playing as the red hovercraft), before the opposing (blue) team collects all of the red flags. A game starts with having 3 red flags and 3 blue flags in each level, but will go up to 6 flags of each color in higher levels. Higher levels also have more opposing hovercraft and a more difficult AI. The opponent hovercraft are split into two groups: one group acts as the capture team, trying to secure all the red flags before the player collects all the blue flags, while the other group serves as the protection for the capture team, trying to defend their flags and prevent the player from interfering with the capture team's efforts. If one of those hovercraft see the player, a tone will sound, like a sonar ping, indicating they've seen the player, and will move to attack.

There are also orbs scattered throughout each maze that will give the player a collectable item or a status effect (such as increasing or decreasing the hovercraft's speed, or temporarily giving an invincibility shield). The collectable items are Wall (which can be placed to temporarily impede an opponent hovercraft), Spring (to make the player's hovercraft jump really high), and Cloak (to temporarily hide the player's hovercraft from the opposing team).

The HUD shows the player's score (in the top right corner), an indicator of how many flags have been captured (in the top left corner), a mini-map (in the center of the bottom), indicators of the player's speed and direction (in the bottom right), and a display of how many items the player has (in the bottom left).

== Remake ==
Hover! was officially remade by Microsoft in 2013, as a browser game. The remake, although published by Microsoft, was mostly developed by Dan Church, with help from Pixel Labs and Microsoft. It was made to showcase the WebGL support in Internet Explorer 11 (but will also work on any WebGL-enabled browser). This version includes updated graphics and touch control support, as well as a multiplayer feature for up to 8 players. Microsoft also offered more technical details about this release on its modern website, but in April 2019, the website for the game was shut down.

This version of the game was also released as a Windows 8.1 app available on the Windows Store (no longer available).

== See also ==
- 1995 in video gaming
- List of games included with Windows
