= ArenaNet =

American video game developer

ArenaNet, LLC
- Type: Subsidiary
- Industry: Video games
- Founded: March 2000; 26 years ago
- Headquarters: Bellevue, Washington, U.S.
- Key people: Colin Johanson (Studio Director)
- Products: Guild Wars series
- Number of employees: 322 (2023)
- Parent: NC
- Website: arena.net

ArenaNet, LLC is an American video game developer and subsidiary of NC, founded in 2000 by Mike O'Brien, Patrick Wyatt and Jeff Strain and located in Bellevue, Washington. They are most notable as developers of the online role-playing game series Guild Wars.

== History ==
Originally named Triforge, ArenaNet was founded in 2000 by three veterans of Blizzard Entertainment: Mike O'Brien ("Mo"), Jeff Strain, and Patrick Wyatt. They had previously held senior roles in the production of Warcraft, StarCraft, and Diablo games, as well as in shared technologies like the battle.net service and "Mo pack" (.mpq) file format. The company was acquired by NCSoft in December 2002 during development of its then-unannounced first title, Guild Wars.

On September 10, 2008, NCSoft announced the formation of NCSoft West, headquartered in Seattle, Washington. Strain and Wyatt left ArenaNet to take roles at NCSoft West in 2008, and ultimately left NCSoft in 2009, leaving O'Brien as the sole remaining founder.

Across 2016, designer/writer Jeff Grubb, game director Colin Johanson, and Josh "Grouch" Davis left ArenaNet for positions at Amazon Game Studios. O'Brien, who was then CEO, served as interim game director for about 1.5 years, until the release of Path of Fire. The game director role was then filled by Mike Z(adorojny), though he too quietly left for Amazon in 2019. The Amazon defectors were credited on Crucible.

On July 5, 2018, O'Brien announced that two game developers, Jessica Price and Peter Fries, had been fired for failing "to uphold our standards of communicating with players" by attacking community members on Twitter. The decision to fire the developers led to a mixed reaction from fans and others inside the industry. O'Brien stood by the decision to release the two developers, citing that their actions had occurred when they were representing themselves and their opinions as the opinions of the company, and that alienating customers was unacceptable, thus necessitating termination of their employment, though he considered the firing to be 'regrettable' due to the fact that both had made favorable contributions to the company. Nathan Grayson, for Kotaku, and Megan Farokhmanesh, for The Verge, reported that there was an uptick in online harassment of female developers after Price's firing and that backlash to Price originated in Gamergate forums. Farokhmanesh wrote that "ArenaNet's swift action to fire both Price and Fries sends a disturbing message to its fans, and especially its most toxic ones: that their power is directly correlated to how loud they yell. It's a worrying precedent for anyone interested in working for ArenaNet, but especially those in marginalized communities that are more likely to face blowback and harassment from the worst parts of its fanbase". Both PC Gamer and Polygon included this event on their respective 2018 gaming controversies lists.

In February 2019, a corporate restructuring plan merged NCSoft West into ArenaNet, and layoffs occurred due to project cancellations. In October, O'Brien and several other ArenaNet veterans announced their departures for the founding of a new studio called ManaWorks. Subsequently, John Taylor took over as Studio Director of ArenaNet. He had been serving as game director since the unannounced departure of Mike Z. In 2020, Colin Johanson rejoined the studio as a co-director.

During a contentious investor call in 2024, NCSoft's acting chairman Park Byeong-moo revealed that ArenaNet was "working on" Guild Wars 3. ArenaNet later responded to inquiries by referring to routine "exploratory" work, without confirming the project's status.

== Titles ==
=== Guild Wars ===
==== Guild Wars: Prophecies ====
Guild Wars, retroactively called Guild Wars: Prophecies, is the first in the Guild Wars series. It is an action role-playing game, with competition in both the player versus player (in random matches, teams, tournaments, or guild battles), and player versus environment (in missions, quests, or area exploration) forms. The developers call this blend a "competitive online role-playing game". Important goals of the game are both to minimize the amount of repetitive actions a player has to perform to become a respectable force in the gaming world (called grind), and also to minimize a player's dependency on game items to stay competitive. These are two goals that set the game apart from most massively online role-playing games (MMORPGs), where one hardcore player will gain major advantages when competing against another more casual gamer simply from having played the game more and found better items. In Guild Wars, the advantages in battle will instead come from how well a player picks and uses the character's 8 skills (from a library of hundreds), an art that is hard to master. The game is different from most MMORPGs in that it did not have any additional recurring fees, but bases revenue on standalone game expansions, or "campaigns" (in addition to microtransactions). This structure was discontinued with Eye of the North, which was a traditional expansion pack that required one of the three standalone campaigns. ArenaNet stated that this was because it felt that this format was restricting its ability to add new game mechanics and balance the overwhelming number of skills introduced with each title, and decided to begin work on Guild Wars 2 to address these issues (with Eye of the North bridging the gap between Guild Wars and Guild Wars 2).

==== Guild Wars: Factions ====
Guild Wars Factions is the first sequel to Guild Wars, and among other things adds a new world map with accompanying missions, two new professions (the Assassin and Ritualist), several new gaming modes, and "titles" which measures the advance of characters in several tasks. It is sometimes referred to as the second "chapter", with the first one being the released game itself, but then with the label Guild Wars: Prophecies to make a distinction between the chapters. The game is a stand-alone product instead of a true expansion, meaning that it does not require Guild Wars: Prophecies to play; though it integrates with the first and third titles to enhance the player's gaming experience.

==== Guild Wars: Nightfall ====
Guild Wars Nightfall, the third chapter in the Guild Wars saga, was released on October 27, 2006. As with the previous chapters, this is a stand-alone product, but it can be merged with the previous campaigns to enhance the gaming experience. This third chapter introduces a new world map, two new professions (the Dervish and Paragon), a new PvP mode, but its most remarkable new feature is the introduction of "Heroes" who travel with the character between missions and campaigns and are fully customizable by the player.

==== Guild Wars: Eye of the North ====
Eye of the North is the first true expansion pack in the Guild Wars series. Released on August 31, 2007, it requires one of three earlier full campaigns, and introduces two new races—the Asura and the Norn—that would later become playable in Guild Wars 2. It was intended to bridge the gap to Guild Wars 2 by means of a Hall of Monuments, a mechanism that allows transferring achievements in the original series to the sequel.

==== Guild Wars: Beyond ====
In an effort to resolve plot threads, ArenaNet has released a series of "mini-expansion" updates, collectively known as Guild Wars Beyond. This series of storylines and events in Guild Wars helps set the stage for Guild Wars 2, which takes place 250 years in the future. Guild Wars Beyond begins with War in Kryta, then Hearts of the North, and continues with Winds of Change. After the Guild Wars 2 release, ArenaNet formally announced that they "will no longer release any new content". Some of these scrapped Beyond-updates included: the Ebon Vanguards' withdrawal and establishment of Ebonhawke; the Lunatic Court and their attempts to free Mad King Thorn; expanding on the story of Palawa Joko and continue that plot thread, which was left dangling in Nightfall; and the disappearance of Evennia, last seen in Old Ascalon during the Krytan civil war.

=== Guild Wars 2 ===
Announced in March 2007, Guild Wars 2 is the sequel to the current Guild Wars series of games. The game is set around 250 years after the events in the original series and contains several new features, consisting of a more persistent world (as opposed to mostly instanced), dynamic questing, a personal branching storyline, and an updated graphics engine. On the morning of August 20, 2009, ArenaNet released the first trailer for Guild Wars 2 on its website. Closed in-house beta testing started in December 2011 and press beta weekend events started being rolled out in March 2012. Beta weekend events began in April 2012 and were open to those who pre-purchased the game, those who received an invite by signing up and those who obtained a beta key from a giveaway. On June 28, 2012, ArenaNet announced that Guild Wars 2 would be released on August 28, 2012; meanwhile, people who pre-purchased the game received a three-day headstart and began playing three days earlier, on August 25, 2012. In its first 2 weeks of sales Guild Wars 2 sold over 2 million copies.

After the release of Guild Wars 2 Arenanet initially spent its time fixing issues with the game; such as bugs and connection problems. Once the game had become stable, it set its focus on further improving Guild Wars 2 and evolving the concept of a 'living world', by adding both temporary and permanent content in biweekly updates. Along with these updates were seasonal and holiday events.

==== Guild Wars 2: Living World Seasons 1 and 2 ====
ArenaNet's "Living World" concept was meant to maintain an appearance of a rapidly evolving and continuously changing game world. After the launch of the base game, biweekly patches of varying size and scope brought new content into the game, continuing for nearly two years until the spring of 2014. This content was not designed to be repeatable, with the added content only being accessible until the next living world patch. The content is now mostly inaccessible, though some instanced content and permanent changes to the game world remain. As the story content of these patches is no longer playable, a cinematic has been created to convey its story to new players. One of the most notable changes brought by this series of patches was the destruction of Lion's Arch, one of the game's major cities. The old version of the city can still be seen in base game personal story instances, which take place before the city's destruction.

The lack of permanence and repeatability of the content brought by Living World led ArenaNet to change its approach in the summer of 2014, launching a new series of patches which introduced new maps to the game world, as well as repeatable story instances similar to those included in the base game. Patches before this change were retroactively rebranded as "Season 1" of the Living World, while the new series was referred to as "Season 2". While Season 1 brought biweekly patches that ranged wildly in size, Season 2 brought a more focused and consistent set of eight patches between March 2014 and January 2015, bridging the story between Season 1 and the Heart of Thorns expansion. Season 2's format of larger releases were referred to as "episodes" in keeping with the television metaphor of "seasons".

==== Guild Wars 2: Heart of Thorns and Season 3 ====
Guild Wars 2: Heart of Thorns (also known as HoT) was the first expansion pack for Guild Wars 2, released on October 23, 2015. Heart of Thorns introduced the Revenant profession to the game, four new open world maps with three distinct biomes, 10-man instanced raids, the mastery system, "elite specializations" for each of the game's now nine professions that substantially change the way they play, the new 'Stronghold' player-versus-player game format, and a new borderland map for the World versus World game mode.

Players who owned the Heart of Thorns expansion were also provided with access to a set of six living world patches released between July 2016 to July 2017, referred to as Season 3 of the Living World. The size of Living World patches grew with this season, as each patch introduced a large new explorable map, new masteries, and repeatable story instances. Season 3 aimed to deliver patches of the same size every 2–3 months by using three rotating teams of developers, each given six to nine months to create each release. It also included some smaller patches with minor changes and events in the spirit of Season 1, which were handled by a separate "current events" team.

==== Guild Wars 2: Path of Fire and Season 4 ====
Guild Wars 2: Path of Fire (also known as PoF) is the second expansion pack for Guild Wars 2, released on September 22, 2017. Path of Fire introduces mounts, new open world maps in Elona (the same setting as Guild Wars: Nightfall), new 10-man raids, and another elite specialization for each of the game's professions.

As with Heart of Thorns, players who own the Path of Fire expansion have been given access to a series of post-expansion story patches with Season 4 of the Living World. While the size and quality of Living World releases increased over Season 4, with the developers expressing a desire to deliver "expansion level stories and features" through Living World patches, the frequency of updates suffered over Season 4, which was marked by repeated delays of episodes. While Season 3 released episodes every two to three months, several episodes in Season 4 have had as much as four months between major story releases. Season 4 consisted of six episodes released between November 2017 and May 2019. During Season 4, the "current events" team updated several festivals that had not been seen since Season 1 and reintroduced them as repeating, yearly events.

The game was nominated for the "Outstanding Video Game" GLAAD Media Award.

==== Guild Wars 2: The Icebrood Saga ====
Announced on August 30, 2019, at an event held by ArenaNet, "The Icebrood Saga" (also known as IBS) is a continuation of the Living World format of content releases, and had previously been referred to by ArenaNet as "Season 5" of the Living World. While previous Living World seasons have bookended expansions, the Icebrood Saga follows directly from Season 4. Like Season 4, it is only available to players who own the Path of Fire expansion.

==== Guild Wars 2: End of Dragons ====
Announced on August 25, 2020, Guild Wars 2: End of Dragons (also known as EoD) is the third expansion pack for Guild Wars 2. Originally slated for a 2021 release date, it was later pushed back to an estimated release date of early 2022. The expansion was previously teased to fans on March 12, 2020, when the developers confirmed the games return to the realm of Cantha, something fans had long requested. The official announcement was accompanied by a cinematic teaser showing off the new area the game would feature. A developer livestream was held on July 27, 2021, which showcased prominent features like the addition of fishing to the game. The expansion was released February 28, 2022.

==== Guild Wars 2: Secrets of the Obscure ====
Announced on March 22, 2022, Guild Wars 2: Secrets of the Obscure (also known as SotO) is the fourth expansion pack for Guild Wars 2. It was released on August 22, 2023. In this Expansion Pack you can get a new mount, the skyscale, for permanent use in the SotO area and in the whole map through masteries. It can be upgraded through masteries as well. There are also loads of new areas to explore.

==== Guild Wars 2: Janthir Wilds ====
Announced on June 04, 2024, Guild Wars 2: Janthir Wilds (also known as JW) is the fifth expansion pack for Guild Wars 2. It was released on August 20, 2024. In this expansion pack, one of the existing mounts, the warclaw, was updated to have new abilities, which can be unlocked through masteries in the open world. All nine professions are also given the proficiency to wield a spear in non-aquatic combat. The players also received access to homesteads, which serve as customisable player housing.

==== Guild Wars 2: Visions of Eternity ====
Announced on July 15, 2025, Guild Wars 2: Visions of Eternity (also known as VoE) is the sixth expansion pack for Guild Wars 2. It was released on October 28, 2025. In this expansion pack, each of the nine professions received a new playable elite specialization. The expansion also includes updates to the skimmer mount, a new instance for homesteads, and new legendaries, including the game's first legendary aquabreather. The expansion launched with 2 maps to explore and 2 more are expected.

=== Guild Wars 3 ===
The company is currently working on Guild Wars 3, which is set to be released for PlayStation 5 and Windows.
