= Guild Wars 2: Path of Fire =

2017 expansion pack for Guild Wars 2

- Developer: ArenaNet
- Publisher: ArenaNet
- Composers: Maclaine Diemer; Brendon Williams; Wilbert Roget, II; Stan LePard
- Series: Guild Wars
- Platforms: Microsoft Windows, macOS
- Release: September 22, 2017
- Genre: Massively multiplayer online role-playing game
- Mode: Multiplayer

Guild Wars 2: Path of Fire is the second expansion pack for Guild Wars 2, a massively multiplayer online role-playing game developed and published by ArenaNet. It was released on Microsoft Windows and macOS on September 22, 2017 and was made available for pre-purchase on August 1, 2017.

The expansion introduces new features such as mounts, additional elite specializations for each profession, a bounty system for defeating certain enemies, and access to the areas of the Crystal Desert and Elona (first seen in the first game's Guild Wars Nightfall expansion). It will also introduce new raids and season four of the living world storyline.

The setting for the expansion is a location known as the Crystal Desert, located in Elona, an area to the south-east of the base-game's playable area known as Tyria. Elona is an area which players have had access to before in the original Guild Wars, the precursor to Guild Wars 2. The expansion takes place ~250 years after the events of the original Guild Wars' story and shortly after the events of Guild Wars 2's first expansion, Heart of Thorns, and the "Living World Season 3" content.

== Storyline ==
The storyline takes place soon after the events of the first expansion, in which "the Commander" – the player's character – and the Pact – a group of the three main dragon-fighting orders of Tyria – defeat Mordremoth, the elder dragon of the jungle. After the dragon was slain, a large amount of Magical Energy traveled throughout the world and made another elder dragon, Kralkatorrik, fly further south to the more densely populated areas of Elona.

After this, the deposed God of war, Balthazar, returns to Tyria 1,329 years after the six Gods left (The Exodus, which is the basis for the Tyrian calendar), to slay this dragon. Whilst this may appear a noble endeavour on paper, dragons are extremely important to the world. As is written in the Guild Wars 2 Wiki:

The function of the Elder Dragons is to keep this magic balanced by periodically awakening and drawing the magic into themselves, thereby reducing the level of magic flowing through the ley lines.

The dragons are essential to the equilibrium of magic distribution throughout the world. Therefore, the aim of the expansion is to stop Balthazar from killing the elder dragon, Kralkatorrik, as this would both destroy the world as we know it and also allow Balthazar to claim the magic for himself.

== Reception ==
Reception

Aggregate score
| Aggregator | Score |
|---|---|
| Metacritic | 83/100 |

Review score
| Publication | Score |
|---|---|
| GameRevolution | 3.5/5 |

It has a score of 83/100 on Metacritic. Game Revolution said "The story is mostly well-written and emotional, the environments are far more beautiful and varied than you'd imagine, and the new mounts change up how you play the entire game. The positives do just barely outweigh the negatives, though, making Path of Fire easily the best part of the entire Guild Wars series that ArenaNet has created."

The game was nominated for "Outstanding Video Game" at the 30th GLAAD Media Awards.
