= Guild Wars 2: Heart of Thorns =

- Developer: ArenaNet
- Publisher: NCSOFT
- Composers: Maclaine Diemer; Lena Chappelle; Stan LePard
- Series: Guild Wars
- Platforms: Microsoft Windows, OS X
- Release: WW: October 23, 2015
- Genre: MMORPG
- Mode: Multiplayer

Guild Wars 2: Heart of Thorns is the first expansion pack for Guild Wars 2, a massively multiplayer online role-playing game developed by ArenaNet and published by NCSOFT. It was released for Microsoft Windows on October 23, 2015. It was made available for pre-purchase on June 16, 2015. After the release date was broadcast on August 29, 2015, the base game was made free-to-play, although free players have fewer character slots and have restrictions on mailing and chatting with other players.

== Gameplay ==
Heart of Thorns introduced the Revenant profession to the game. The Revenant is a heavy armor class, balancing out the armor classes such that there are now 3 of each type (light, medium, heavy). The Revenant focuses on using the power of legends from Guild Wars past, granting it a variety of different skills. Usable legends include dwarf, demon, centaur, assassin, and dragon - each legend focusing on a specific theme of abilities, including tanking, control, healing, damage, and utility, respectively. All classes can gain the ability to choose an elite specialization, which unlocks previously unusable weapons for each class, as well as new abilities and skills. Elite specializations are unlockable only at level 80.

Guild halls were also added with Heart of Thorns, inspired by those from the first Guild Wars. Guilds can claim an area in the Heart of Maguuma and then build a guild hall on it, which is a large, instanced home where guilds can gather and organize. Guild halls cater to guilds both large and small with equal respect.

Four new open world maps were added to the game in Heart of Thorns. Each map has three distinct biomes at different vertical levels in the map, including the roots, jungle floor, and canopy. The maps also feature Outposts and Adventures, new gameplay elements that further enhance the dynamic event system that Guild Wars 2 is known for, as well as many new races and civilizations, which include the Exalted, Itzel, Nuhoch, saurians and the chak.

Heart of Thorns added hang gliding as a feature for exploration, as part of a new emphasis on verticality in new open world maps; gliding was later expanded to the rest of the game in a 2016 update.

The expansion introduced raids to the game, instanced content designed for groups of ten players that is supposed to represent the most challenging content in the game. Raids are separated into several wings, each wing consisting of a number of encounters. The first wing was released shortly after the release of the expansion, and the other wings were opened later on. The rewards of raids include legendary armor.

Heart of Thorns introduced a new player versus player game mode, Stronghold, which takes place on a new map called the Battle of Champion's Dusk. Stronghold was inspired by MOBA games and was designed to give players a completely new take on PvP in Guild Wars 2. In this game mode, players need to break through enemy lines and defenses with the goal of eliminating the opposing team's lord. Teams battle to earn and control supply, used to hire troops, that can be used to help push into the enemy stronghold. A new World versus World borderland was also added to the game, named the Desert Borderlands. Each keep in this borderland has a distinct theme, and can include Earth, Fire, and Air, and comes with various abilities. New siege weaponry, structure upgrades, and world abilities have been added to the game as well. The new Desert Borderlands was inspired by RTS games.

== Development ==
Guild Wars 2: Heart of Thorns was announced on January 24, 2015 at PAX South. The expansion will introduce new group challenges, new profession specializations, a new profession, and an account-based "mastery" system for character progression through the new territories featured in it, as well as make changes to current player versus player content. In August 2015, ArenaNet announced the release date of October 23, 2015.

Four new open world maps were added to the game in Heart of Thorns. Unlike previous maps, these maps were developed less broadly and more deeply than other maps, focusing specifically on verticality; instead of having more maps with little content, ArenaNet wanted to add a few maps with very deep content and a high replay value.

== Reception ==
Reception

Aggregate score
Aggregator	Score
Metacritic	81/100

It has a score of 81/100 on Metacritic. PC Gamer awarded it a score of 85%, saying "A great expansion, and a promising sign of things to come. Issues aside, Heart of Thorns is a clever addition to one of the best MMOs around." Game Revolution awarded it a score of 3.0 out of 5, saying "Heart of Thorns struggles to deliver an enjoyable experience in a variety of ways. Its lack of exciting progression coupled with an aging foundation will make it a disappointing adventure for many."
