= Guild Wars =

Series of online 3D fantasy role-playing video games

- Original logo
- Genres: ORPG, MMORPG
- Developer: ArenaNet
- Publishers: WW: ArenaNet; WW: NCSoft; BR: Level Up! Games; CN: Tencent Games; CN: Kongzhong (formerly)
- Platform: Windows
- First release: Guild Wars Prophecies; April 28, 2005
- Latest release: Guild Wars 2: Visions of Eternity; October 28, 2025

Guild Wars is an online role-playing game franchise developed by ArenaNet and published by NCSoft. The games were critically well received and won many editor's choice awards, as well as awards such as "Massively Multiplayer/Persistent World Game of the Year" by the Academy of Interactive Arts & Sciences, as well as Best Value, Best Massively Multiplayer Online Role-Playing Game (MMORPG), and Best Game. Guild Wars was noted for being the "first major MMO to adopt a business model not based on monthly subscription fees", its instanced approach to gameplay, and the quality of the graphics and play for computers with low specifications. In April 2009, NCSoft announced that 6 million units of games in the Guild Wars series had been sold. The sequel and second major entry into the series, Guild Wars 2, was announced in March 2007 and released on August 28, 2012. It features updated graphics and gameplay mechanics, and continues the original Guild Wars tradition of no subscription fees. The Guild Wars series had sold 11.5 million copies by August 2015

== Publications ==
Year	Title	Type	Note
2005	Guild Wars Prophecies	MMORPG	Standalone game
2006	Guild Wars Factions	MMORPG	Standalone game
2006	Guild Wars Nightfall	MMORPG	Standalone game
2007	Guild Wars: Eye of the North		Expansion pack
2009	Guild Wars: Ghosts of Ascalon	Novel	Novel by Matt Forbeck and Jeff Grubb, cover art by Richard Anderson
2010	Guild Wars: Edge of Destiny	Novel	Novel by J. Robert King
2012	Guild Wars 2	MMORPG	Standalone game
2013	Rytlock's Critter Rampage	Free browser game	
2013	Guild Wars: Sea of Sorrows	Novel	Novel by Ree Soesbee
2015	Guild Wars 2: Heart of Thorns		Expansion pack
2017	Guild Wars 2: Path of Fire		Expansion pack
2022	Guild Wars 2: End of Dragons		Expansion pack
2023	Guild Wars 2: Secrets of the Obscure		Expansion pack
2024	Guild Wars 2: Janthir Wilds		Expansion pack
2025	Guild Wars 2: Visions of Eternity		Expansion pack
2025	Guild Wars Reforged	MMORPG	Re-release of the original 2005 game
TBA	Guild Wars 3	MMORPG	Standalone game
TBA	MISTBOUND: Guild Wars Card Game	Collectible card game	Standalone game, China only. Developed and published by NC.

=== Related works ===
The NCSoft crossover game Master X Master featured Rytlock from Guild Wars 2 as a playable character.

== Guild Wars subseries (2005–2007) ==
The original subseries consisting of the Guild Wars Prophecies, Guild Wars Factions, Guild Wars Nightfall, and Guild Wars: Eye of the North games coexist within a unified game world. The games provide two main modes of gameplay—a cooperative role-playing component that is specific to each campaign, and a competitive PvP component that is shared across all campaigns. Three stand-alone campaigns, one major expansion pack, and several "mini"-expansions were released in the series from April 2005 to April 2013. The games depict the fictional fantasy world of Tyria; each campaign focuses on events in disjointed sections of the world at roughly the same time. A player creates an avatar to play through the cooperative storyline of a campaign, taking on the role of a hero who must save Tyria from its antagonists. Players can group with other players and non-player characters, known as henchmen and heroes, to perform missions and quests found throughout the game-world. PvP combat is consensual, team based, and limited to areas designed for such combat. Players are allowed to create characters at maximum level and with the best equipment specifically for PvP play, which is unusual for MMORPGs. Historically, ArenaNet hosted official Guild Wars tournaments where the most successful players and guilds competed for the chance to play live at gaming conventions and win prizes up to US$100,000.

=== Gameplay ===
Players use a 3D avatar to interact with the world around them. The game predominantly features a third-person perspective but also has the option of first-person. These characters are able to walk/run and interact with other characters through chat. They can also perform actions such as fighting and picking up objects, as well as interacting with special objects.

=== Character creation ===
Players can choose from a range of up to ten different professions. When creating a character, players can select their hair style, face, skin tone, height and avatar name—the selection depending upon that profession chosen. As the player progresses through the game, they can unlock different armor and weapons to alter the visual appearance of that avatar. They can also decide whether they want their avatar to start in a Player vs. Environment world (the RPG aspect of the game), or get right into the competitive Player vs. Player and fight live against other players in the game.

The maximum level for character development is capped at 20—by this point, the character will also have reached 170 attribute points. Players may also choose to do certain quests to gain another 30 attribute points, making the maximum points available 200. Experience can still be gained and is used to learn more skills or buy consumable items throughout the game.

=== Professions ===
A profession is a type of class commonly found in most RPGs and is central to the gameplay in Guild Wars. Each profession has an array of attributes and skills that help narrow a class's proficiency in order to perform a customized role that is determined by the player. The Warrior profession, for example, has access to the primary Strength attribute that increases their armor penetration with martial weapons, and is able to wear heavy armor providing the highest protection against physical damage of all professions. Elementalists, on the other hand, wear less protective armor, but can use their primary Energy Storage attribute to give them a much greater pool of energy than other professions.

Guild Wars also introduces the ability to choose a secondary profession, expanding the selection of attributes and skills. A character does not, however, have access to the primary attribute of its secondary profession. Many, but not all, skills become more powerful with more points in a class's primary attribute. A Warrior/Elementalist, therefore, is a warrior who may use spells in combat, although the Elementalist spells used will generally not have as much power as those of a primary Elementalist. This is increased by the fact that runes, which among other things increase attribute levels, can only increase the attribute levels associated with a player's primary profession.

There are over a thousand skills in the game that can be acquired by the character over time, but players may only use and equip up to 8 of them at any one time. This introduces levels of strategy, in which one must have a careful selection of skills that work well with one another and with teammates in order to survive.

The core professions are Warrior, Monk, Elementalist, Ranger, Necromancer and Mesmer. The Assassin and Ritualist professions are exclusive to Guild Wars: Factions, which can be played along with the aforementioned core professions. The Paragon and Dervish professions are exclusive to Guild Wars: Nightfall, and can also be played with the core professions. Unlike the campaigns, Guild Wars: Eye of the North (the only expansion pack of the Guild Wars franchise) does not offer any new playable professions.

=== Environment ===
The Guild Wars universe consists of persistent staging zones known as towns and outposts. These areas normally contain non-player characters that provide services such as merchandising or storage. Other NPC's provide quests and present rewards to adventurers. These areas are also used when forming groups of people to go out into the world and play cooperatively. Players that venture out from the staging area and into an instanced explorable area are then able to use their weapons and skills to defeat monsters and interact with other objects in the game. As players progress through the game, they gain access to additional staging zones. Players can then transport their characters instantly from one staging area to another using a process commonly referred to as 'map traveling'.

=== Combat ===
Apart from fighting with weapons, skills make up the majority of combat interaction. Each skill has a different effect when used, and fall under many different categories. They can range from offensive skills such as setting foes on fire and defensive skills which include resurrection and healing allies. Enchantments that include giving players extra health points or Hexes that drain the enemy's life and add it to your own make up part of the skill selection in Guild Wars. Attack skills are used in conjunction with weapons to augment the damage that they can deal and cause different side effects (such as knocking people to the ground with a hammer, causing bleeding wounds that deal additional damage over time with a sword, or striking multiple foes with an axe).

Most skills have a governing attribute that determines its power and effect. These attributes are assigned using a number of attribute points similar to the point buy ability score generation system in Dungeons & Dragons.

Guild Wars skill system is often compared to collectible card games such as Magic: The Gathering because of the way the different skills interact. While in a town or staging area, a character's skill and attribute selection can be freely modified to construct a "build". Once in a combat zone (such as an explorable area or a PvP arena), the build becomes immutable until the character exits the combat zone and returns to a staging area. Players generally either choose a specific build for a given area or role, or use builds that synergize with the builds of other characters in the party.

A player's ability to help the party is based on the way a player's "build" works. If the skills combine well, such as a hex spell that makes an enemy attack faster and then another one that makes him miss 75% of the time and take damage for each miss, then the build will work effectively.

In PvE, monsters that are slain will generate gold and loot which can be traded or sold to players or NPCs. Unique or rare weapon designs are often found from defeating powerful monsters, or by opening treasure chests.

In PvP, reputation in the form of "faction" is gained based on how well a player performs. "Balthazar faction" is gained by the number of wins that you and your team achieve, and for each unique kill. Most PvP in Guild Wars is fast-paced, while the transition period between games may take longer.

=== Co-operative gameplay ===
Player versus Environment (PvE) missions of Guild Wars use several standard tropes of the MMORPG genre. Players explore the game-world, kill monsters, perform quests and complete missions to earn rewards and advance the story. Rewards include experience points, skill points, skills, gold, faction, reputation and items for the player character. Some of these rewards not only advance the particular character being played at the time, but also unlock features of the game account-wide.

In each campaign the player is involved in a linear story with which they interact by performing a series of primary quests and replayable missions. Quests are given to a player by NPCs via text dialog. As quests and missions are completed, new areas, new quests, and new missions are unlocked for the player's character to access. Missions allow the player character to participate in the major events of the storyline, such as significant battles against the main antagonist. Both quests and missions can feature in-game cut scenes which advance the story and provide context to the actions which follow. Cut scenes are in the third-person, often featuring the party leader's character and revealing elements of the game that the character would not normally be aware of, such as the actions of an antagonist. Players are given the option of skipping the cut scenes if all party members agree upon it.

There are different types of PvE in Guild Wars, and it is advisable to prepare a build to meet the challenges of each type:

Cooperative Mission
Missions that move the game story. These form the backbone of the storyline in each campaign. Each requires a party of 4–8 players (and sometimes NPCs) to complete certain objectives. The party fails the mission if every member dies.
Explorable Area
Unlike cooperative missions, your party can die in explorable areas without grave consequences, and you will be respawned at a "resurrection shrine", but there are exceptions. Explorable areas are where quests are accepted and played out. Unlike a cooperative mission, players can work on several quests at the same time.
Elite Mission
Especially difficult missions, with an 8–12 player party size, that require a high amount of preparation, skill, knowledge and time commitment. Having the correct team build is a must, and players must coordinate with other team members more than normal.
Dungeon
Subterranean explorable areas in the Eye of the North expansion. A quest is given to guide the party through the dungeon, culminating in a boss fight, after which rewards are distributed.
Minigame
Minigames are either competitive or cooperative "mini missions" or battles that have no bearing on the plot of the Guild Wars campaigns. Some are present in the game only during special events, such as the Dragon Arena for the Canthan New Year and Dragon Festival. Rewards offered for competing in these games include tokens which can be traded for prizes
Challenge Mission
A special form of mission that is not part of the main story, in which parties aim to reach a high score. Unlike other forms of PvE play, Challenge Missions can theoretically go on forever, with the difficulty increasing the longer the player or party manages to stay alive.

=== Competitive gameplay ===
Player versus Player (PvP) combat in Guild Wars is consensual and team-based. Such combat is restricted to special PvP areas, the majority of which are located on the core area known as The Battle Isles. Individual campaigns also have certain campaign-specific PvP arenas. Players may participate in PvP combat with either their role-playing characters or with characters created specifically for PvP. Characters are rewarded with experience points for victories in competitive battle and the player account also acquires faction points redeemable for in-game rewards. In addition to this victory may also award points which contribute towards completion of character or account based titles.

The following are the competitive modes in Guild Wars:

Random Arena
Four-on-four matches with teams randomly composed from those waiting to enter combat. There are many different arenas with different victory conditions: deathmatch and kill-count.
Team Arena
The Team Arenas were PvP arenas where two groups of four organized players battle each other. Groups were formed in the eponymous outpost and Random Arenas teams with 10 consecutive wins automatically enter the Team Arenas. Both Balthazar faction and Gladiator points could be obtained from Team Arenas. Team Arenas was replaced with Codex Arena in 2009.
Codex Arena
Four-on-four matches with player-managed teams. These matches are played in the same areas as the Random Arena with a few exceptions. Each class has a pool of limited amounts of skills to choose from and this pool changes every 6 hours.
Heroes' Ascent
A continuous tournament where players form teams of eight to battle in a sequence of arenas, culminating in the Hall of Heroes whose results are broadcast to all online players in addition to rewarding the victors with high-end loot. Arenas in the Heroes' Ascent tournament include deathmatch, altar-control, and capture-the-relic victory conditions. Victories in the Heroes' Ascent award players with fame points that can be used to determine the rank of the player.
Guild Battles
Two guilds meet in guild halls and stage a tactical battle with the aim of killing the opposing Guild Lord, a well-protected NPC. Victory in guild battles affects the rank of the guild in the global Guild versus Guild (GvG) ladder. GvG is considered the most supported of competitive formats in Guild Wars. In 2005, ArenaNet hosted a Guild Wars World Championship, and in 2006, the Guild Wars Factions Championship was hosted as well. Since then, the Automated Tournament system has become the norm, but smaller 3rd-party tournaments have been hosted, including the Rawr Cup and the Guild Wars Guru cup. The GWWC, GWFC, RawrCup, and GWG Tournament all had real life prizes; the former tournaments had cash prizes, the RawrCup and Guru Tournament had laptops and MP3 players to give away.
Alliance Battles
Guild Wars Factions introduced an arena where twelve players aligned with one of the opposing Kurzick and Luxon factions team up to fight an opposing team to gain new territory for their faction. The twelve player team is composed of three teams with four human players each. The three teams are selected randomly from the teams waiting on each side when the match begins. Alliance Battles grant alliance faction and affect the border between the two factions in the Factions-specific continent of Cantha. The location of the border affects the map in which the battles take place by adding a bias to favor the faction losing the war. Additionally, alliance faction can be contributed to a player's guild (if it is allied with the respective faction), allowing that guild to "control" a town in their faction's territory.
Competitive Missions
Factions also introduced a pair of competitive arenas, named Fort Aspenwood and The Jade Quarry, where randomly assembled teams of 8 players from the opposing factions enact particular events in the Kurzick/Luxon war. Victories in these missions have no global effect, but do grant the players with alliance faction.
Minigame
Minigames are either competitive or cooperative "mini missions" or battles that have no bearing on the plot and do not advance the story line of the Guild Wars campaigns. Most are added to the game during festivals and events.
Hero Battles
Hero Battles was the name given to the mode of PvP known as Hero versus Hero (HvH). In this contest, players would enter the battle with 3 heroes (fully customizable NPC allies), and fight another player and his/her team of 3 heroes. A player must have had a named account to participate in Hero Battles. This type of PvP was removed in the October 22nd, 2009 update.

Guild Wars has a continuously running automated tournament system. Players or guilds elect to participate in the tournament by buying in-game tokens using their PvP faction points. The participants are divided randomly into groups of 32 that participate daily in up to six Swiss-rounds held on a fixed schedule, and the top eight guilds continue on to a single-elimination tournament. Participants who are unable to field a full team automatically forfeit their round. Success in daily automated tournaments qualifies that particular guild for play in the monthly automated tournament, and the final victors of this tournament earn a number of real and in-game rewards. Players who do not participate in the automated tournament were allowed to place bets on the results of these tournaments for a number of in-game rewards prior to February 2010.

Many competitive matches may be observed by players by means of an observer mode. Important PvP matches such as matches in the Hall of Heroes or between highly rated guilds may be observed (after a delay of fifteen minutes) by others in order to see the tactics used by successful teams and attempt to learn or counter them. Guilds may additionally observe their own Guild Battles for a fixed period of time.

=== Guilds ===
As the name suggests, guilds are a core element of Guild Wars, manifesting not only as social units but also being closely linked with the game mechanics. Although a player is not required to join a guild, it adds value to the gaming time and increases camaraderie. Often, joining a guild is a good way to get help from more experienced players as the in-game guild interface allows communication between guild members.

A guild leader creates the guild by registering a guild name and a tag (between two and four characters long) with a Guild Registrar, found in some major towns. The guild tag is displayed in brackets after the names of guild members. The leader also designs the guild's cape (from a large palette of shapes, patterns and emblems), and purchases a guild hall that serves as the guild headquarters and may be furnished with merchants, traders, and storage NPCs. Each guild hall is an individual instanced outpost located at the same spot on the Battle Isles, but they are not physically accessible to non-allied members as the only way to enter a guild hall is by "map travel". The guild leader recruits new players to the guild and can promote a number of them to guild officers, who can then help with the recruitment and further promotion of officers. All player characters on the same Guild Wars account belong to the same guild. Players may leave their guild whenever they please, but only the leader and officers can dismiss non-officer players from the guild; the leader has the additional power to dismiss officers and disband the guild. Guilds have a membership limit of 100 members; player communities with more than that many members generally create allied sister guilds, often named similarly and using the same tag and cape.

Up to ten individual guilds may ally together to form an alliance. Members of an alliance may communicate over a shared chat channel, and visit the guild halls of the other guilds of the alliance. Each alliance has a leader guild that initiates the alliance, the leader of which is also the alliance leader, who may admit or dismiss guilds from the alliance. Each alliance must be devoted to either the Kurzicks or the Luxons, the two Canthan factions (from Guild Wars Factions) locked in perpetual conflict. Players can accumulate faction (reputation) with either the Kurzicks or the Luxons, which can either be "donated" to the alliance or redeemed for certain in-game rewards. The alliances with the highest total amount of donated faction are given control of certain in-game outposts on the Canthan continent; controlling an outpost gives the alliance members access to restricted areas of the outposts, containing, among other things, merchants who sell at a discount.

In addition to membership in guilds, a player may be a guest of any number of other guilds. Guest privileges are limited to visiting the guild hall and participating in guild or alliance battles. An accepted invitation expires after 24 hours.

=== Campaigns ===
Full games in the original Guild Wars sequence were released in episodes known as campaigns. Players must purchase an individual campaign in order to access the game elements specific to that campaign; however, all campaigns are linked in one game world. Each campaign is independent of the others, with its own co-operative storyline, campaign-specific skills, and competitive arenas. Players owning different campaigns may still interact in shared areas, including trading for items specific to the campaigns they have not purchased. Players who own two or more campaigns may transport their characters freely from one campaign to the other, integrating into the storyline as a foreign hero.

The first campaign, Guild Wars Prophecies (originally named Guild Wars), was released on April 28, 2005. The Prophecies storyline is situated on the continent of Tyria and revolves around the Flameseeker Prophecy, a prophecy made by an ancient dragon named Glint.

Prophecies was followed by Guild Wars Factions on April 28, 2006, released exactly a year after Prophecies. Factions is situated on the small southern continent of Cantha that is separated from Tyria by a vast ocean. The events of the Factions campaign concern the return from death of a corrupted bodyguard named Shiro Tagachi. Factions features a global persistent war between the rival vassal nations of Cantha; the Luxons and the Kurzicks, and the notion of guild alliances (see guilds above). The continent of Cantha is heavily based upon and influenced by eastern Asia.

The third campaign, Guild Wars Nightfall, was released on October 27, 2006. Nightfall features the arid continent of Elona, joined to southern Tyria across a vast desert. Nightfall introduced heroes, advanced computer-controlled units that can be micro-managed by players, including the ability to customize their skill layout and equipment. The continent of Elona is heavily based on and influenced by North Africa.

=== Expansions ===
Scrapping their initial plans for a fourth campaign, ArenaNet has released an expansion pack, Guild Wars: Eye of the North, to the previous three campaigns on August 31, 2007. Not being a full campaign, this expansion requires one of the other released campaigns, and is only accessible by player characters at level 10 and above. Eye of the North therefore does not feature new professions, but contains new content for existing characters: dungeons, a number of new skills, armor, and heroes. Eye of the North is set in previously inaccessible territory from the first Guild Wars campaign, Prophecies. It is intended to be a bridge to the sequel to the Guild Wars series, Guild Wars 2. As a promotion for their online store and Eye of the North, ArenaNet released a Bonus Mission Pack for purchase online. It contains playable recreations of four incidents in the history of Tyria, Cantha, and Elona, and each mission expands the backstory for one of four major NPCs.

In an effort to resolve plot threads, ArenaNet has released a series of "mini-expansion" updates, collectively known as Guild Wars Beyond. This series of storylines and events in Guild Wars helps set the stage for Guild Wars 2, which takes place 250 years in the future. Guild Wars Beyond begins with War in Kryta, then Hearts of the North, and continues with Winds of Change. After the Guild Wars 2 release, ArenaNet formally announced that they "will no longer release any new content, but will continue to update the game. We would like to thank all Guild Wars players who participated in our active poll, choosing what rewards you would like to see when linking your Guild Wars accounts". Some of these scrapped Beyond-updates included: the Ebon Vanguards' withdrawal and establishment of Ebonhawke; the Lunatic Court and their attempts to free Mad King Thorn; expanding on the story of Palawa Joko and continuing that plot thread, which was left dangling in Nightfall; and the disappearance of Evennia, last seen in Old Ascalon during the Krytan civil war.

== Guild Wars 2 (2012) ==
Guild Wars 2 is the sequel to the original Guild Wars. It was released on August 28, 2012. The game's campaign centers on the awakening of the Elder Dragon Zhaitan and the cataclysm that this brings to Tyria. This threat unites the game's major factions to form a Pact. From 2012 to 2014 the game was actively updated with temporary content releases that came to be known as Living World Season 1. From 2014 to 2015 updates were shifted to a permanent content model that integrated with the characters' story progression. These updates, comprising Living World Season 2, featured a plot to awaken Mordremoth, leading to the game's first expansion pack.

=== Heart of Thorns (2015) ===
Heart of Thorns is the first expansion pack for GW2 and was released on October 23, 2015. The campaign follows the struggle of the Pact forces against the Elder Dragon Mordremoth. Major new features were introduced, including a new Revenant profession, elite specializations for existing professions, gliding, and guild halls. This was followed by two years of content updates, encompassing Living World Season 3. This season dealt with the aftermath of battling Mordremoth and initial forays against the remaining dragons, as well as the return of the god Balthazar, who seeks to kill the Elder Dragon Kralkatorrik at any cost. It also introduced raid content, a feature that was promised in the marketing of HoT.

=== Path of Fire (2017) ===
Path of Fire is the second expansion pack for GW2 and was released on September 22, 2017. In this campaign, the Pact heroes pursue Balthazar and the Elder Dragon Kralkatorrik to Elona, the continent originally featured in Nightfall. This expansion introduced mounts to the game. Content updates will be divided into both Season 4, which deals primarily with fighting Palawa Joko, and Season 5 of the Living World.

=== End of Dragons (2022) ===
End of Dragons is the third expansion pack for GW2 and was released on February 28, 2022. This campaign follows the Pact Heroes into the land of Cantha as they finish pursuing the remainder of the Elder Dragons. This expansion introduced new elite specializations for all professions, a new combat mount the siege turtle, fishing and skiffs.

=== Secrets of the Obscure (2023) ===
Secrets of the Obscure is the fourth expansion pack for Guild Wars 2 and was released on August 22, 2023.

=== Janthir Wilds (2024) ===
Janthir Wilds is the fifth expansion pack for Guild Wars 2 and was released on August 20, 2024.

=== Visions of Eternity (2025) ===
Visions of Eternity is the sixth and latest expansion pack for Guild Wars 2 and was released on October 28, 2025.

== Guild Wars 3 (TBA) ==
Guild Wars 3 was officially announced on 5 June 2026 at Summer Game Fest 2026 after being in development for a number of years. It is speculated to be utilising Unreal Engine 5, a first for the franchise.
