= Player versus environment =

Fighting computer-controlled enemies

Player versus environment (PvE), also known as player versus monster (PvM), and commonly misinterpreted as player versus entity or player versus enemy, is a term used for both single-player and online games, particularly MMORPGs, CORPGs, MUDs, other online role-playing video games and survival games to refer to fighting computer-controlled enemies – in contrast to player versus player (PvP) which is fighting other players in the game. In survival games a large part may be fighting the elements, controlling hunger and thirst, learning to adapt to the environment and exploration.

Usually a PvE mode can be played alone, with human companions or with AI companions. The PvE mode may contain a storyline that is narrated as the player progresses through missions. It may also contain missions that may be done in any order.

== Examples ==
Guild Wars narrates its story by displaying in-game cut scenes and dialogue with non-playable characters (NPCs). To enhance replayability, missions can often be completed many times. Characters playing in this mode are often protected against being killed by other players and/or having their possessions stolen. An example of a game where this is not the case is Eve Online, where players can be, and often are, ambushed by other human players player versus player while attempting to complete a quest. Some games, such as World of Warcraft, offer the player the choice of participating in open-world PvP combat or doing quests without PvP interruption, by offering players the ability to join servers where PvP is enabled by default, or allowing them to activate temporary "flags" which allow them to attack and be attacked by other "flagged" players for a limited time.

== See also ==
- Player versus player
- Cooperative gameplay
- Conflict (narrative)#Man versus nature
- Deathmatch
- Single player video game
