= Jack Wall (composer) =

Video game music composer

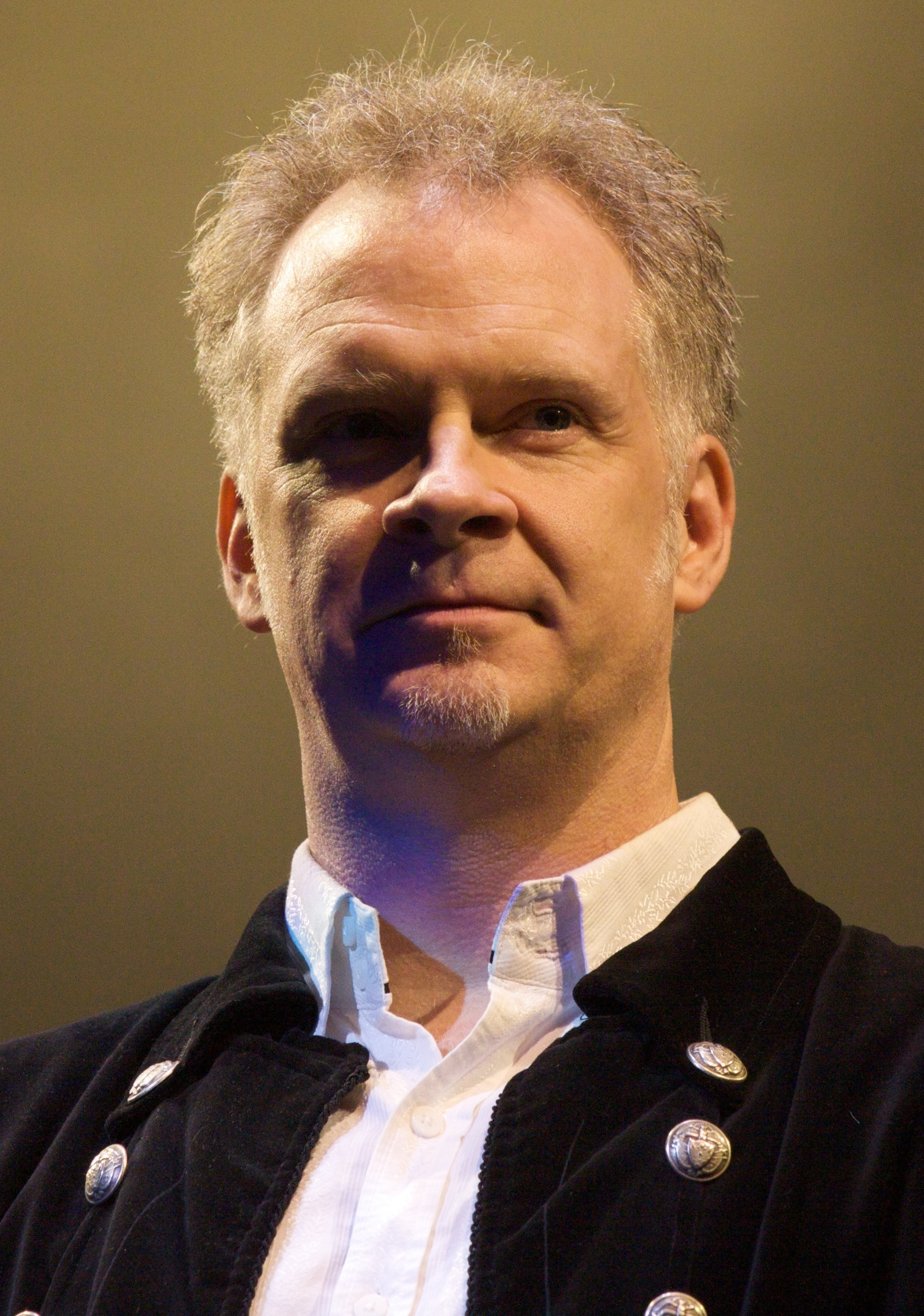
- Wall at a Video Games Live event in 2009

Background information
- Born: 1963 (age 62–63); Phoenixville, Pennsylvania, U.S.
- Genres: Video game music
- Occupations: Composer, symphonist, conductor
- Years active: 1995–present

Jack Wall is an American video game music composer. He has worked on video game music for over 20 games including the Myst franchise, Splinter Cell, Jade Empire, Mass Effect, and majority of Treyarch made Call of Duty starting with Black Ops II. Wall earned a degree in civil engineering from Drexel University in Philadelphia, Pennsylvania, and, after a brief stint working in civil engineering, transitioned into music production. He worked with musicians such as John Cale, David Byrne, and Patti Smith, and, after performing increasingly complex production and sound engineering tasks, moved into music composition in 1995.

Wall's first video game composition was the soundtrack to Vigilance. Primarily composing in an orchestral style, by 2001 he composed the soundtrack to Myst III: Exile, which was the title he says put him on the map as a video game composer. In 2002, Wall became one of around 20 co-founders of the Game Audio Network Guild (G.A.N.G.) as well as senior director. In 2005, Wall, along with G.A.N.G. founder and fellow composer Tommy Tallarico, produced the Video Games Live concert series, having served as the conductor for the international concert tour. His soundtracks for Myst III: Exile, Myst IV: Revelation, Rise of the Kasai, Jade Empire, Mass Effect, and Mass Effect 2 were nominated for and won multiple awards.

== Early life ==
Jack Wall, born in Phoenixville, Pennsylvania, earned a degree in civil engineering from Drexel University in Philadelphia and began a career "planning out sub-divisions and shopping malls". At the same time he was in a rock band, as he was also interested in music. After recording a demo tape with the band, he was inspired to change career paths and quit his job to work in the music industry. He initially worked as a bartender and later started working in recording studios in Philadelphia and later Boston and New York City, where he worked for Skyline Studios. In 1991 Wall left Skyline, and until 1994 worked as an independent music producer and sound engineer in New York City, working with musicians such as John Cale, David Byrne, and Patti Smith, as well as local bands. Over those three years, Wall consistently worked with Cale, eventually handling arrangement and orchestration of Cale's compositions as well as producing and working as a sound engineer. While working with Cale on the soundtrack to a movie, House of America, he watched as Cale composed thirty minutes of music in almost real time, and was inspired to begin composing music.

== Career ==
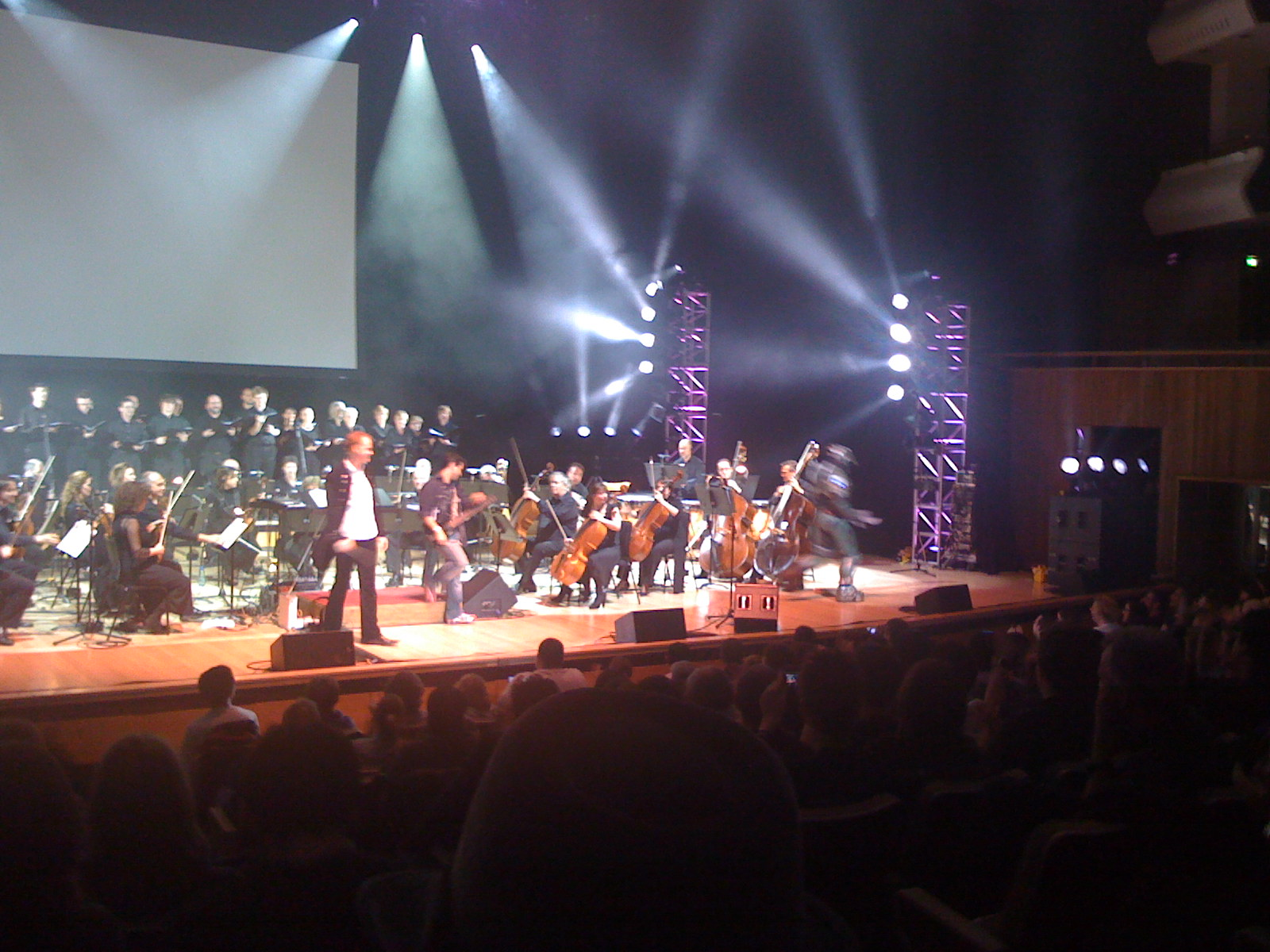
October 24, 2008 Video Games Live performance with Wall as the conductor

By late 1995, Wall was living in Los Angeles and was married to singer Cindy Shapiro, who he had met in 1994. She knew Ron Martinez, who was starting a video game company, PostLinear Entertainment, and he asked Wall to work for it as a composer. He composed the soundtracks for several games for PostLinear; the first released was Vigilance in 1997. His daughter Gracie was also born early in 1997. After leaving the company, he composed the soundtrack to 2001's Myst III: Exile, which was his first orchestral score and the work that he said put him on the map as a video game composer. It was also interesting to him, as it was a sequel to the first video game he had ever played, Myst. Myst III was nominated for the Academy of Interactive Arts & Sciences "Outstanding Achievement in Original Music Composition" award, which it lost to the Tropico soundtrack.

In 2002, Wall became one of around 20 co-founders of the Game Audio Network Guild (G.A.N.G.) as well as senior director. The group works to promote the appreciation of video game music, as well as serve as a professional resource for video game music composers and musicians. It was developed and headed by Tommy Tallarico. As of 2010, Wall serves as vice chairman, after stepping down from heading the board of directors in 2007. He continued to compose soundtracks for games such as The Mark of Kri and Unreal II: The Awakening. His work on Myst IV: Revelation in 2004 earned him his first three awards, those of "Best Live Performance Recording", "Best Original Vocal Song: Choral", and "Music of the Year" from the G.A.N.G. awards.

Wall, along with Tommy Tallarico, has produced the Video Games Live concert series, which began on July 6, 2005. The two had been planning the concert series, which presents orchestrated versions of music from dozens of games, for three years. The concerts consist of segments of video game music performed by a live orchestra with video footage and synchronized lighting and effects, as well as several interactive segments with the audience, conducted by Wall. Video Games Live was intended to take the idea of a symphonic video game music concert, which was popular in Japan, and combine it with a rock concert to make it appealing to western fans. The series is international and ongoing, with more than 70 shows planned for 2009. Wall composed the soundtracks to three games released in 2005 including the award-winning score to Jade Empire, and some of his works released since then have been 2007's Mass Effect and 2010's Mass Effect 2. Mass Effect's score earned Wall several awards and nominations, as did Mass Effect 2.

== Musical style and influences ==
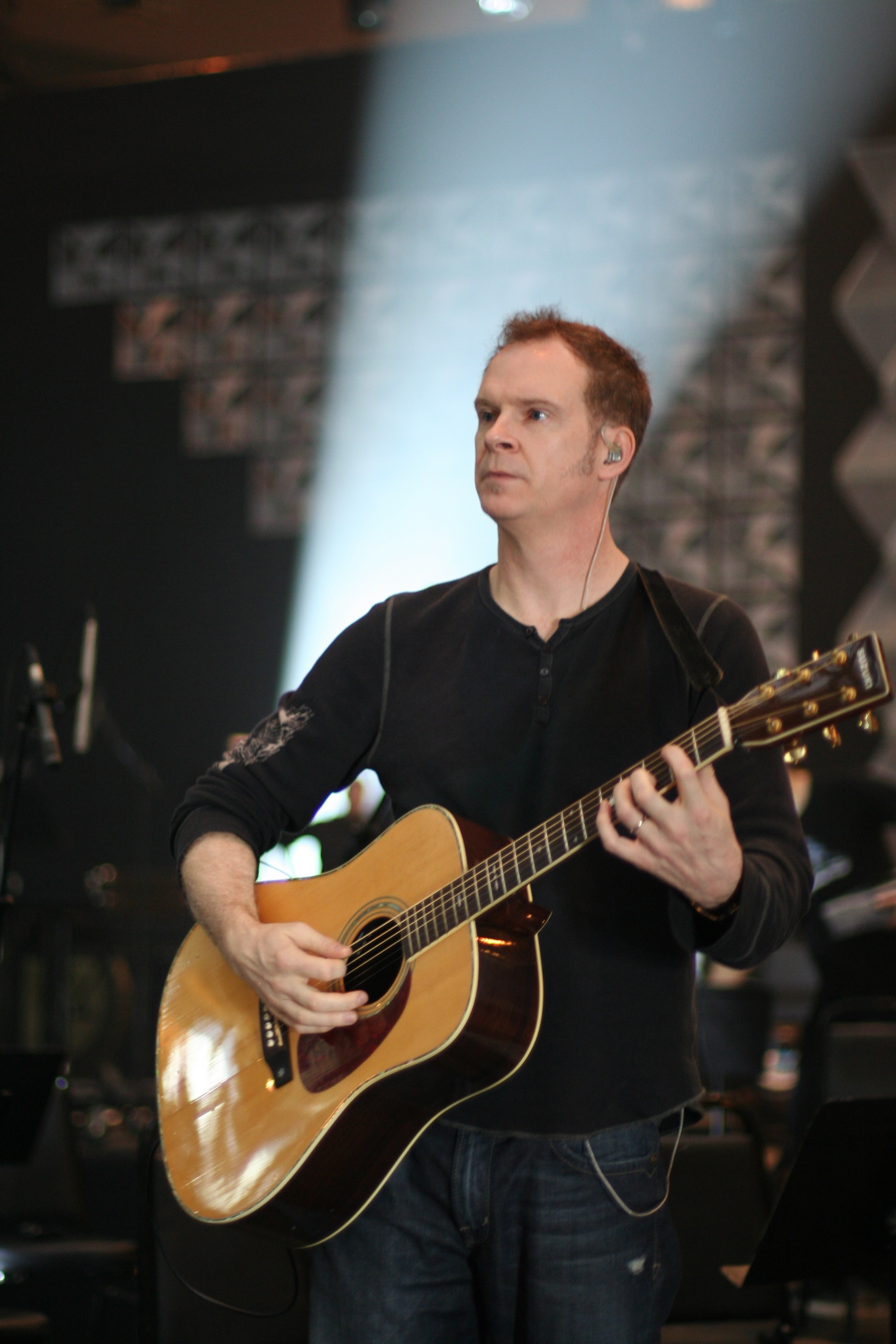
Wall in 2010

Although many of his works are orchestral, Jack Wall has worked in a wide variety of styles, including "heavy metal meets orchestral" and "tribal percussion". For Jade Empire, he focused on using Chinese instruments and Taiko drums. When writing a video game score, Wall prefers a collaborative approach with the game designers to creating the music, as he feels that the "tug back and forth of ideas" makes the music stronger. He notes, however, that he has to be flexible, and willing to create his own vision for the music. As part of this, he prefers to be able to see illustrations and game design documents before beginning, as they provide insight into the feel of the game so that his music can mesh in with it. He also believes that a good video game music composer needs to have a lot of technical sound production skill to be successful. Wall has said that the Myst and Mass Effect soundtracks are his favorites that he has created. Wall stated that he was primarily interested in scoring games that are "interesting", and that his main concern was creating something original. Although he has worked with live orchestras and synthetic orchestras, Wall recommends that game developers use a live one, despite the expense, as he feels they add a much more dynamic sound to the music and allow the composer more freedom than synthesizer samples.

== Discography ==
=== Video games ===
Video games
Year	Title	Developer(s)	Publisher(s)	Notes
1998	Vigilance	PostLinear Entertainment	SegaSoft	—N/a
1998	10Six	SegaSoft	SegaSoft	—N/a
1998	Flying Saucer	PostLinear Entertainment	JoWooD; Software 2000	—N/a
2000	Animorphs: Know the Secret	Gigawatt Studios	GT Interactive	—N/a
2000	Evil Dead: Hail to the King	Heavy Iron Studios	THQ	—N/a
2001	Ultimate Ride	Disney Interactive Studios	Disney Interactive Studios	—N/a
2001	Myst III: Exile	Presto Studios	Ubisoft	—N/a
2001	Disney's Extremely Goofy Skateboarding	Krome Studios	Disney Interactive Studios	—N/a
2002	The Mark of Kri	San Diego Studio	Sony Computer Entertainment	—N/a
2003	Ben-Hur: Blood of Braves	Microïds	Microïds	—N/a
2003	Unreal II: The Awakening	Legend Entertainment	Atari	—N/a
2004	Wrath Unleashed	The Collective	LucasArts	—N/a
2004	Tom Clancy's Splinter Cell: Pandora Tomorrow	Ubisoft Shanghai	Ubisoft	—N/a
2004	Myst IV: Revelation	Ubisoft Montreal	Ubisoft	—N/a
2005	Rise of the Kasai	Bottlerocket Entertainment	Sony Computer Entertainment America	—N/a
2005	Neopets: The Darkest Faerie	Idol Minds	Sony Computer Entertainment	—N/a
2005	Jade Empire	BioWare	Microsoft Games Studios	—N/a
2007	Mass Effect	BioWare	Microsoft Games Studios	Composed with Sam Hulick, Richard Jacques, and David Kates
2010	Mass Effect 2	BioWare	Electronic Arts	Composed with Jimmy Hinson, Sam Hulick, and David Kates
2012	Call of Duty: Black Ops II	Treyarch	Activision	Main theme composed by Trent Reznor
2013	Lost Planet 3	Spark Unlimited	Capcom	—N/a
2015	Call of Duty: Black Ops III	Treyarch	Activision	"I Live (Electronic Version)", "Ignition" and "Safehouse" composed by Brian Tuey in soundtrack album
2016	Into the Stars	Fugitive Games	Iceberg Interactive	Additional music composed by Jim Lordeman
2017	Dota 2	Valve	Valve	The International 2017 Music Pack
2017	LawBreakers	Boss Key Productions	Nexon	One of 7 artists, responsible for "Axel", "Bombchelle", and "T.A.S.C Theme"
2018	Call of Duty: Black Ops 4	Treyarch	Activision	—N/a
2020	Call of Duty: Black Ops Cold War	Treyarch; Raven Software	Activision	—N/a
2021	Call of Duty: Vanguard	Sledgehammer Games; Treyarch	Activision	Zombies score; composed in collaboration with Bear McCreary
2023	Call of Duty: Modern Warfare III	Sledgehammer Games; Treyarch	Activision	Zombies score; main score composed by Walter Mair
2024	Call of Duty: Black Ops 6	Treyarch; Raven Software	Activision	Zombies score composed by Brian Tuey; additional music composed by Jim Lordeman, Big Giant Circles, and Romes
2025	Call of Duty: Black Ops 7	Treyarch; Raven Software	Activision	—N/a

=== Film and television ===
Film and television
Year	Title	Production company(s)	Distributor(s)	Notes
2016	Hard Target 2	Universal 1440 Entertainment; Living Films	Universal Pictures Home Entertainment	Composed with Trevor Morris
2017–2019	Shadowhunters	Constantin Film	Disney–ABC Domestic Television (United States); Netflix (International)	Composed with Trevor Morris

== Awards ==
Awards
Year	Award	Category	Work	Result
2001	Academy of Interactive Arts & Sciences	Outstanding Achievement in Original Music Composition	Myst III: Exile	Nominated
2004	GameSpot Best of 2004 Awards	Best Original Music	Myst IV: Revelation	Nominated
2004	Game Audio Network Guild	Best Interactive Score	Myst IV: Revelation	Nominated
2004	Game Audio Network Guild	Best Original Vocal Song: Pop	Myst IV: Revelation ("Welcome")	Nominated
2004	Game Audio Network Guild	Best Live Performance Recording	Myst IV: Revelation	Won
2004	Game Audio Network Guild	Best Original Vocal Song: Choral	Myst IV: Revelation ("Main Theme")	Won
2004	Game Audio Network Guild	Music of the Year	Myst IV: Revelation	Won
2005	Academy of Interactive Arts & Sciences	Outstanding Achievement in Original Music Composition	Rise of the Kasai	Nominated
2005	Academy of Interactive Arts & Sciences	Outstanding Achievement in Original Music Composition	Jade Empire	Nominated
2005	Game Audio Network Guild	Best Live Performance Recording	Jade Empire	Nominated
2005	Game Audio Network Guild	Best Original Instrumental Song	Jade Empire ("Main Theme")	Nominated
2005	Game Audio Network Guild	Best Original Soundtrack Album	Jade Empire	Won
2007	Game Audio Network Guild	Best Original Instrumental Song	Mass Effect ("The Citadel")	Nominated
2007	Game Audio Network Guild	Best Original Soundtrack Album	Mass Effect	Nominated
2007	IGN Best of 2007 Awards	Best Original Score	Mass Effect	Won
2007	GameSpot Best of 2007 Awards	Best Original Music	Mass Effect	Won
2010	British Academy of Film & Television Arts	Best Original Music	Mass Effect 2	Nominated
2010	Game Audio Network Guild	Best Soundtrack Album	Mass Effect 2	Nominated
