= 9th Annual Interactive Achievement Awards =

Video game award ceremony

- Date: February 9, 2006
- Venue: Hard Rock Hotel and Casino
- Country: Las Vegas, Nevada, USA
- Hosted by: Jay Mohr

Highlights
- Most awards: God of War (7)
- Most nominations: God of War (12)
- Overall Game of the Year: God of War
- Hall of Fame: Richard Garriott

The 9th Annual Interactive Achievement Awards was the 9th edition of the Interactive Achievement Awards, an annual awards event that honored the best games in the video game industry during 2005. The awards were arranged by the Academy of Interactive Arts & Sciences (AIAS), and were held at the Hard Rock Hotel and Casino in Las Vegas, Nevada on February 9, 2006. It was also held as part of the Academy's 2006 D.I.C.E. Summit, and was hosted by stand-up comedian Jay Mohr.

This was the first year that the Academy did not have separate genre awards for console and computer. In addition, there was only one award for "Outstanding Innovation in Gaming". "Wireless Game of the Year" was seemingly replaced with "Cellular Game of the Year", as the former was part of the description for "Cellphone Game of the Year" in the nomination packet. The announcement for submissions listed the "Handheld Game of the Year" as a "Game of the Year" category along with "Cellular Game of the Year", but would both be listed as genre categories when the finalists were announced.

God of War received the most nominations and won the most awards, including "Overall Game of the Year". Sony Computer Entertainment received the most nominations and won the most awards. Nintendo had the most nominated games, but Electronic Arts had the most award-winning games. There was a tie for the "Outstanding Achievement in Gameplay Engineering" award between Guitar Hero and Nintendogs. There was also a tie for "Massive Multiplayer/Persistent World Game of the Year" between City of Villains and Guild Wars, the only time a publisher, NCSoft, published both games that tied for a category.

Richard Garriott, creator of Ultima, was inducted into the Academy of Interactive Arts & Sciences Hall of Fame.

== Winners and Nominees ==
Winners are listed first, highlighted in boldface, and indicated with a double dagger (‡).

=== Game of the Year ===
**Overall Game of the Year**: **God of War** — **SCE Santa Monica Studio**‡; Call of Duty 2 — Infinity Ward, Activision; Guitar Hero — Harmonix, RedOctane; Nintendogs — Nintendo EAD; Shadow of the Colossus — SCE Japan Studio
**Computer Game of the Year**: **Age of Empires III** — **Ensemble Studios**, **Microsoft Game Studios**‡; Battlefield 2 — DICE, Electronic Arts; Civilization IV — Firaxis Games, 2K Games; F.E.A.R. — Monolith Productions, Vivendi Universal Games; The Movies — Lionhead Studios, Activision	**Console Game of the Year**: **God of War** — **SCE Santa Monica Studio**‡; Call of Duty 2 — Infinity Ward, Activision; Guitar Hero — Harmonix, RedOctane; Nintendogs — Nintendo EAD; Shadow of the Colossus — SCE Japan Studio

=== Outstanding Innovation in Gaming ===
**Outstanding Innovation in Gaming**
- **Guitar Hero** — **Harmonix, RedOctane**‡
  - God of War — SCE Santa Monica Studio
  - Nintendogs — Nintendo EAD
  - Shadow of the Colossus — SCE Japan Studio
  - The Movies — Lionhead Studios, Activision

=== Outstanding Achievement ===
**Outstanding Achievement in Game Design**: **Guitar Hero** — **Harmonix**, **RedOctane**‡; God of War — SCE Santa Monica Studio; King Kong — Ubisoft Montpellier; Nintendogs — Nintendo EAD; Psychonauts — Double Fine Productions, Majesco	**Outstanding Achievement in Story and Character Development**: **Call of Duty 2: Big Red One** — **Treyarch**, **High Voltage Software**, **Activision**‡; Brothers in Arms: Earned in Blood — Gearbox Software, Ubisoft; Gun — Neversoft, Activision; King Kong — Ubisoft Montpellier; Sly 3: Honor Among Thieves — Sucker Punch Productions, Sony Computer Entertainment
**Outstanding Achievement in Animation**: **God of War** — **SCE Santa Monica Studio**‡; Oddworld: Stranger's Wrath — Oddworld Inhabitants, Electronic Arts; Prince of Persia: The Two Thrones — Ubisoft Montreal, Ubisoft Casablanca; Rise of the Kasai — BottleRocket Entertainment, Sony Computer Entertainment; Shadow of the Colossus — SCE Japan Studio	**Outstanding Achievement in Art Direction**: **Shadow of the Colossus** — **SCE Japan Studio**‡; God of War — SCE Santa Monica Studio; Jade Empire — BioWare, Microsoft Game Studios; King Kong — Ubisoft Montpellier; Ultimate Spider-Man — Treyarch, Activision
**Outstanding Achievement in Soundtrack**: **Guitar Hero** — **Harmonix**, **RedOctane**‡; Burnout Revenge — Criterion Games, Electronic Arts; SSX on Tour — EA Canada; The Warriors — Rockstar Toronto; Wipeout Pure — SCE Studio Liverpool	**Outstanding Achievement in Original Musical Composition**: **God of War** — **SCE Santa Monica Studio**‡; Gun — Neversoft, Activision; Jade Empire — BioWare, Microsoft Game Studios; Kameo — Rare, Microsoft Game Studios; Rise of the Kasai — BottleRocket Entertainment, Sony Computer Entertainment
**Outstanding Achievement in Sound Design**: **God of War** — **SCE Santa Monica Studio**‡; Condemned: Criminal Origins — Monolith Productions, Sega; F.E.A.R. — Monolith Productions, Vivendi Universal Games; King Kong — Ubisoft Montpellier; Tom Clancy's Splinter Cell: Chaos Theory — Ubisoft Montreal, Ubisoft Milan	**Outstanding Achievement in Gameplay Engineering (Note: Finalists tied for this category.)**: **Guitar Hero** — **Harmonix**, **RedOctane**‡; **Nintendogs** — **Nintendo EAD**‡; God of War — SCE Santa Monica Studio; Lumines: Puzzle Fusion — Q Entertainment, Ubisoft; Zoo Tycoon 2: Endangered Species — Blue Fang Games, Microsoft Game Studios
**Outstanding Achievement in Online Gameplay**: **Battlefield 2** — **DICE**, **Electronic Arts**‡; Age of Empires III — Ensemble Studios, Microsoft Game Studios; Call of Duty 2 — Infinity Ward, Activision; Mario Kart DS — Nintendo EAD; Project Gotham Racing 3 — Bizarre Creations, Microsoft Game Studios	**Outstanding Achievement in Visual Engineering**: **Shadow of the Colossus** — **SCE Japan Studio**‡; Call of Duty 2 — Infinity Ward, Activision; F.E.A.R. — Monolith Productions, Vivendi Universal Games; God of War — SCE Santa Monica Studio; Kameo — Rare, Microsoft Game Studios

=== Outstanding Character Performance ===
**Outstanding Character Performance - Male**: **God of War** — **SCE Santa Monica Studio**‡; Gun — Neversoft, Activision; Jade Empire — BioWare, Microsoft Game Studios; Oddworld: Stranger's Wrath — Oddworld Inhabitants, Electronic Arts; Tom Clancy's Splinter Cell: Chaos Theory — Ubisoft Montreal, Ubisoft Milan	**Outstanding Character Performance - Female**: **Jade Empire** (Note: Kim Mai Guest as Dawn Star) — **BioWare**, **Microsoft Game Studios**‡; Gun — Neversoft, Activision; Need for Speed: Most Wanted — EA Canada, EA Black Box; Prince of Persia: The Two Thrones — Ubisoft Montreal, Ubisoft Casablanca

=== Genre Awards ===
**Action/Adventure Game of the Year**: **God of War** — **SCE Santa Monica Studio**‡; Prince of Persia: The Two Thrones — Ubisoft Montreal, Ubisoft Casablanca; Shadow of the Colossus — SCE Japan Studio; The Incredible Hulk: Ultimate Destruction — Radical Entertainment, Vivendi Universal Games; Tom Clancy's Splinter Cell: Chaos Theory — Ubisoft Montreal, Ubisoft Milan	**First-Person Action Game of the Year**: **Battlefield 2** — **DICE**, **Electronic Arts**‡; Brothers in Arms: Road to Hill 30 — Gearbox Software, Ubisoft; Call of Duty 2 — Infinity Ward, Activision; Condemned: Criminal Origins — Monolith Productions, Sega; F.E.A.R. — Monolith Productions, Vivendi Universal Games
**Role-Playing Game of the Year**: **Jade Empire** — **BioWare**, **Microsoft Game Studios**‡; Dragon Quest VIII: Journey of the Cursed King — Level-5, Square Enix; Dungeon Siege II — Gas Powered Games, Microsoft Game Studios; Fire Emblem: Path of Radiance — Intelligent Systems, Nintendo; Radiata Stories — Tri-Ace, Square Enix	**Fighting Game of the Year**: **Soulcalibur III** — **Namco**‡; Fight Night Round 2 — EA Chicago; Tekken 5 — Namco; WWE SmackDown! vs. Raw 2006 — Yuke's, THQ
**Sports Game of the Year**: **SSX on Tour** — **EA Canada**‡; MLB 2006 — 989 Studios, Sony Computer Entertainment; Major League Baseball 2K5: World Series Edition — Visual Concepts, 2K Games; NBA 2K6 — Visual Concepts, 2K Games; Super Mario Strikers — Next Level Games, Nintendo	**Racing Game of the Year**: **Need for Speed: Most Wanted** — **EA Canada**, **EA Black Box**‡; Burnout Revenge — Criterion Games, Electronic Arts; Forza Motorsport — Turn 10 Studios, Microsoft Game Studios; Mario Kart DS — Nintendo EAD; Project Gotham Racing 3 — Bizarre Creations, Microsoft Game Studios
**Children's Game of the Year**: **We Love Katamari** — **Namco**‡; Chicken Little — Avalanche Software, Buena Vista Games; Madagascar — Toys for Bob, Activision; Sly 3: Honor Among Thieves — Sucker Punch Productions, Sony Computer Entertainment; Tak: The Great Juju Challenge — Avalanche Software, THQ	**Downloadable Game of the Year**: **Wik: The Fable of Souls** — **Reflexive Entertainment**‡; Chuzzle — Raptisoft, PopCap Games; Egg vs. Chicken — Gamelab, PlayFirst; Oasis — Mind Control Software, PlayFirst; Tradewind Legends — Sandlot Games
**Family Game of the Year**: **Guitar Hero** — **Harmonix**, **RedOctane**‡; Dance Dance Revolution: Mario Mix — Konami, Hudson Soft, Nintendo; Lego Star Wars: The Video Game — Traveller's Tales, Eidos Interactive, LucasArts	**Simulation Game of the Year**: **The Movies** — **Lionhead Studios**, **Activision**‡; Animal Crossing: Wild World — Nintendo EAD; Silent Hunter III — Ubisoft Bucharest
**Strategy Game of the Year**: **Civilization IV** — **Firaxis Games**, **2K Games**‡; Age of Empires III — Ensemble Studios, Microsoft Game Studios; Empire Earth II — Mad Doc Software, Vivendi Universal Games	**Massively Multiplayer/Persistent World Game of the Year**: **City of Villains** — **Cryptic Studios**, **NCSoft**‡; **Guild Wars** — **ArenaNet**, **NCSoft**‡; Final Fantasy XI: The Vana'diel Collection — Square Enix; Lineage II: The Chaotic Chronicle — NCSoft
**Handheld Game of the Year**: **Nintendogs** — **Nintendo EAD**‡; Burnout Legends — Criterion Games, Electronic Arts; Grand Theft Auto: Liberty City Stories — Rockstar Leeds; Mario & Luigi: Partners in Time — AlphaDream, Nintendo; The Legend of Zelda: The Minish Cap — Flagship, Capcom, Nintendo	**Cellular Game of the Year**: **Ancient Empires II** — **Macrospace**, **Sorrent**‡; High Seize — RedLynx, Nokia; Mile High Pinball — Ideaworks3D, Nokia; One — Digital Legends, Nokia; Skipping Stone — Gamevil, I-Play

=== Hall of Fame Award ===
- Richard Garriott

=== Multiple nominations and awards ===
==== Multiple Nominations ====
Games that received multiple nominations
Nominations	Game
12	God of War
7	Guitar Hero
7	Shadow of the Colossus
6	Nintendogs
5	Call of Duty 2
5	Jade Empire
4	F.E.A.R.
4	Gun
4	King Kong
3	Age of Empires III
3	Battlefield 2
3	Prince of Persia: The Two Thrones
3	The Movies
3	Tom Clancy's Splinter Cell: Chaos Theory
2	Burnout Revenge
2	Civilization IV
2	Condemned: Criminal Origins
2	Kameo
2	Mario Kart DS
2	Need for Speed: Most Wanted
2	Oddworld: Stranger's Wrath
2	Project Gotham Racing 3
2	Rise of the Kasai
2	Sly 3: Honor Among Thieves
2	SSX on Tour

Nominations by company
Nominations	Games	Company
25	6	Sony Computer Entertainment
15	6	Activision
15	7	Microsoft Game Studios
14	8	Nintendo
14	7	Ubisoft
13	7	Electronic Arts
7	1	Harmonix
7	1	RedOctane
6	3	Vivendi Universal Games
6	2	Monolith Productions
5	1	BioWare
4	3	2K Games
4	1	Neversoft
3	3	Namco
3	3	NCSoft
3	3	Nokia
3	3	Square Enix
3	1	DICE
3	1	Ensemble Studios
3	1	Lionhead Studios
2	2	Avalanche Software
2	2	Bizarre Creations
2	2	Gearbox Software
2	2	PlayFirst
2	2	THQ
2	2	Treyarch
2	2	Visual Concepts
2	1	BottleRocket Entertainment
2	1	Firaxis Games
2	1	Oddworld Inhabitants
2	1	Rare
2	1	Rockstar Games
2	1	Sega
2	1	Sucker Punch Productions

==== Multiple awards ====
Games that received multiple awards
Awards	Game
7	God of War
5	Guitar Hero
2	Battlefield 2
2	Jade Empire
2	Nintendogs
2	Shadow of the Colossus

Awards by company
Awards	Games	Company
9	2	Sony Computer Entertainment
5	1	Harmonix
5	1	RedOctane
4	3	Electronic Arts
3	2	Microsoft Game Studios
2	2	Activision
2	2	Namco
2	2	NCSoft
2	1	BioWare
2	1	DICE
2	1	Nintendo
