= Guild Wars: Eye of the North =

- Developer: ArenaNet
- Publisher: NCSOFT
- Series: Guild Wars
- Platform: Windows
- Release: August 31, 2007
- Genre: Massively multiplayer online role-playing
- Mode: Multiplayer

Guild Wars: Eye of the North is an expansion pack to the multiplayer online role-playing game Guild Wars by ArenaNet, a subsidiary of NCSOFT. It was released worldwide on August 31, 2007. Unlike other games in the Guild Wars sequence, Eye of the North requires players to own one of the earlier three campaigns. It features no tutorial content and is intended for characters that have already reached level 10 or higher.

Eye of the North does not feature new professions, but it has 18 new multi-level dungeons, 150 new skills (50 of them restricted to PVE), 40 new armor sets, and 10 new heroes. In addition, there are new items, weapons, and titles. Eye of the North is in part intended to act as a bridge from Guild Wars to Guild Wars 2 and introduces the new races of the Norn (dwellers on the icy slopes of the Shiver Peak Mountains to the north) and Asura (inhabitants of the southern part of the Maguuma Jungle), both of which would later become playable in the sequel.

Eye of the North continues the Prophecies story, which is told in three acts. In Act, I, a great earthquake tears across the three continents of Tyria, Cantha, and Elona, revealing entrances to a network of tunnels. From there, players enter into the homelands of the Charr (from the Prophecies story) to the north, the Asura to the west, and the Norn at the far end of the Shiver Peaks. The story culminates with a battle against the Great Destroyer, the chief antagonist of the dwarven pantheon.

== Gameplay ==
=== Dungeons ===
A large percentage of the Eye of the North story takes place in the "dungeons" that delve deep underground. Each dungeon has one to five levels, and completing some levels requires the players to acquire keys, use switches or levers, defeat bosses, or interact with NPCs. The final level of the dungeon has a boss that must be defeated to clear the dungeon. Defeating the dungeon boss will cause a chest to appear, yielding various loot for each party member.

Dungeons interact with the game's various maps like all underground areas: The Mission Map above ground displays an overhead map of the entire region, with unexplored regions blurred out but still visible. In dungeons, the entire mission map is black until the player explores a region. In addition, the mission map resets to unexplored when the player leaves the explorable zone. Similarly, the world map does not change to reflect which portions of the dungeon have been explored and does not reflect the precise position of the player. Rather, the player is shown roughly in the centre of the region on the map where the dungeon is situated.

Earlier Guild Wars campaigns featured a small number of dungeons, such as Sorrow's Furnace in Guild Wars Prophecies or The Deep and Urgoz's Warren in Guild Wars Factions. They play a more significant part of the gameplay of Eye of the North, with a few alterations being made to accommodate dungeon exploration. Most Eye of the North dungeon levels has an area map located somewhere near the entrance. The area map does not expose the layout of the level but does place indicators on the mission map where key items (keys, bosses, collectors, etc.) are located. Reaching certain areas of the dungeon, particularly the final boss, will place a marker on the overhead map, indicating where that location is.

Dungeon levels also frequently include locked doors which require a specific key to unlock. Unlike most key-like items in earlier Guild Wars dungeons (such as gears in Sorrow's Furnace), these keys are not carried by the player. They simply appear on-screen once the player acquires them, meaning the player is not hampered by the loss of their weapon and off-hand item benefits.

Eye of the North focuses heavily on PvE accomplishments, such as titles. One of the new features is an item that acts similar to a quest log, recording specific feats the player accomplishes in gameplay. Upon defeating the final boss of the dungeon, a new "page" in the quest log is filled in. Completed log books can later be turned into one of the allied factions in the game (Norn, Asura, Ebon Vanguard, or Dwarves) for an experience and reputation bonus.

=== Minigames ===
Eye of the North introduces a number of "minigames" to the Guild Wars world. Each major faction has its own minigame which can be used to earn reputation points for that faction. The full list of these games is as follows:

Dwarven Boxing
The player character wears a pair of brass knuckles (based on the Assassin profession's Daggers) and enters a round of one-on-one combat with a computer-controlled opponent. The player's normal skill bar is replaced with a collection of boxing skills, some with unique skill animations. When a character's health goes to zero, he or she is knocked down; the player must then repeatedly use a "Stand Up" skill to regain energy and re-enter the battle. If the player is unsuccessful in regaining the full amount of energy, the character is considered to be "KO'd" and loses the match. Each successful match awards the character with Dwarven reputation points.
Norn Fighting Tournament
The player character enters a tournament sequence of six matches, with the final match being against Magni the Bison (a reference to M. Bison of the Street Fighter series). Victory in the tournament awards Norn reputation points, certain prize items, and championship tokens that are redeemable for trophies such as crowns.
Polymock
Resembling Pokémon, the player fields a team of up to three "pieces" against his opponent's team. Each piece morphs into a specific creature from the Guild Wars world, with a set skill bar and predetermined weaknesses and resistances. Prior to beating Hoff, the Polymock master and final boss of the Polymock quest line, victories award Asura title track points, a Polymock piece and sometimes an Asura title track spell. After beating Hoff, victory in Polymock matches merely awards Asura title track points.

== Plot summary ==
Eye of the North is set eight years after an event known as "The Searing" occurs in Guild Wars: Prophecies, where a northern race of cat-like beasts known as the Charr incinerate the Tyrian kingdom of Ascalon. Earthquakes begin to increase in frequency across all the three continents of the game world; Tyria, Cantha and Elona, which correspond to the three Guild Wars stand-alone campaigns; Prophecies, Factions and Nightfall, respectively. Strange creatures have begun to emerge from crevasses created by these earthquakes and the player is tasked to investigate further, starting from either Lion’s Arch, port city of Tyria; Kaineng Center, port city of Cantha; or Kamadan, Jewel of Istan, port city of Elona.

Descending into one of these crevasses, the player fights enemies native to the respective campaign before coming across a Dwarf named Ogden Stonehealer and an Asuran named Vekk – a race unknown to most humans. It is not long before the party is ambushed by a group of creatures known as "Destroyers". The party then makes their escape through an Asura Gate (a teleportation device similar in appearance and function to ones seen in Stargate) which brings them into the Far Shiverpeaks. Vekk destroys the gate to ensure the Destroyers have no chance of following them. It is here that they meet a Norn (a race of giants that resemble the Vikings in terms of culture and appearance) named Jora. She tells the player of the existence of humans in the Far Shiverpeaks. Ogden, Vekk and the player eventually make their way north to a huge structure called "The Eye of the North". It is here that they come across Gwen, a character that first appeared in Prophecies as a little girl in Ascalon, prior to the "Searing". She informs the player of her temporary appointment as leader of the "Ebon Vanguard" (a group committed to fighting the Charr) in the absence of an officer named Captain Langmar.

The player enters the Eye of the North and discovers a room called the Hall of Monuments. Upon approaching a scrying pool at the centre of the room, the player triggers a vision which displays Destroyers working their way towards the surface. Shocked by the prospect of the Destroyers being so close to their goal, Ogden, Vekk and Gwen make their own separate pleas to the player in gaining reinforcements. Ogden suggests getting help from the Norn; Vekk suggests that his people, the Asura, are the best choice; whilst Gwen believes that finding Captain Langmar's squad in the Charr Homelands would most benefit the player. The player can choose to help Ogden, Vek or Gwen in any order he/she so wishes but is required to gain the help of the Norn, Asura and the Ebon Vanguard before proceeding further into the game.

Through the course of the game, the player receives three more visions through the scrying pool. One of them reveals that the main antagonist is a being known as "The Great Destroyer"; the nemesis of the Dwarven God, The Great Dwarf. Another reveals its location, which Vekk identifies as a cavern nearby the Central Transfer Chamber, a junction for the Asura Gate network. With the help of new allies secured, Ogden Stonehealer tells the player that they must head to the Heart of the Shiverpeaks to summon the Great Dwarf. Only then would the Dwarves stand a chance against the Great Destroyer. The player eventually meets with King Jalis Ironhammer, the king of the allied dwarven peoples. Jalis prepares for the final onslaught against the Destroyers by initiating a ritual that permanently changes him and the allied Dwarves by imbuing them with magical strength and transforming them into stone. It is then that the final assault commences in earnest as the Dwarves, the Norn, the Asura, and the Ebon Vanguard fight side by side to reach the Central Transfer Chamber. Upon arriving at the Central Transfer Chamber, the player conducts the final battle against The Great Destroyer.

== Editions ==
Pre-release Bonus Pack

The pre-release bonus pack is similar to the pre-order packs from the earlier stand-alone campaigns. It was available electronically from the in-game store between July 20, 2007, and the release of the standard version. It included a game trial key for the previous campaigns, three replicable bonus weapons, and an access key for a public preview event for the Eye of the North the weekend before the standard release.

Standard

The standard edition contains the full game. Unlike the stand-alone chapters, Eye of the North does not add extra character slots to an existing account and does not have a Collector's Edition. In Europe, an alternative "Bear Edition" is available featuring different cover art.

Guild Wars Platinum Edition

Guild Wars Platinum Edition is a bundle containing both the Prophecies campaign and the Eye of the North expansion. This was released on August 31, 2007.

== Critical reception ==
Reception

Aggregate scores
Aggregator	Score
GameRankings	78.46%
Metacritic	79/100

Review scores
Publication	Score
1Up.com	C+
GameSpot	8.0/10
GameSpy	3.5/5
GamesRadar+	4.5/5
IGN	7.9/10

Guild Wars Eye of the North was well received by critics, but was the lowest rated game in the series, receiving a score of 78.46% on GameRankings and 79/100 on Metacritic. Although it was widely seen to be a valuable addition to the Guild Wars series for its fans—the gameplay differs little from earlier games—the content was viewed as short, challenging compared to other Guild Wars offerings, and, as Eye of the North completes the Prophecies story, less accessible to players approaching the expansion from either Factions or Nightfall. The quality, pacing and size of the in-game rewards were also criticized by some reviewers.

The new features introduced by Eye of the North had a mixed reception. The three new mini games received good reviews, with GameSpy stating that they are "really well-designed and incredibly involving." Some reviewers criticized their unavailability in the player versus player mode of the game. The Hall of Monuments was considered by 1UP.com to be a "hasty advertisement for Guild Wars 2";

During the 11th Annual Interactive Achievement Awards, Eye of the North received a nomination for "Massively Multiplayer Game of the Year" by the Academy of Interactive Arts & Sciences.
