= Rise of the Kasai =

2005 video game

- Developer: BottleRocket Entertainment
- Publisher: Sony Computer Entertainment America
- Producer: Johnathan Beard
- Designers: Dan Mueller; Andrew Zoboki
- Artist: Tim Neveu
- Writer: Johnathan Beard
- Composers: Jack Wall; Rod Abernethy; Jason Graves; Lars Anderson; Mike Reagan
- Platform: PlayStation 2
- Release: NA: April 5, 2005
- Genres: Action-adventure, Hack and slash
- Mode: Single-player

Rise of the Kasai is a 2005 action-adventure video game developed by BottleRocket Entertainment and published by Sony Computer Entertainment for the PlayStation 2. The game serves as a sequel to The Mark of Kri, developed by San Diego Studio where employees at BottleRocket had previously worked. It was released only in North America. It was re-released on the PlayStation 4 via PlayStation Network in 2016.

== Plot ==
Rise of the Kasai centers on a band of warriors known as the Rakus and their battles against the evil sect of dark magicians known as the Kasai, led by the traitor of the Rakus, Maibisi, who plans to collect the six Marks of Kri and unleash a multitude of horrors in order to rule the world. The narrative focuses on a series of events that take place ten years prior to the events of The Mark of Kri and ten years afterwards with levels taking place in the past feature the older generation of the Rakus, Baumusu, Rau's trainer from The Mark of Kri, and a new character named Griz, Baumusu's mentor. Meanwhile, future levels feature the new generation of the Rakus, Rau and Tati, Rau's younger sister who bears the Mark of Kri in order to stop Maibisi from unleashing world domination.

== Story ==
The story was told by the raven, Kuzo and assisting the Oracle, who was distressed that Rau Utu was slain by unforeseen circumstances. It was confirmed, however, that Rau was betrayed, but neither the Gods, the Oracle or Kuzo himself were aware of who had betrayed him.

20 years ago, long before Kuzo became Rau's scout, spirit guide and chronicler, he was Baumusu's scout and spirit guide. In Tapuroku, he and his mentor Griz were sent on official Rakus business in attempting to capture Maibisi, whom years ago, betrayed the Rakus despite their warnings that the marks were evil as they stood steadfast in their faith, stripped Maibisi of his rank. In retaliation, the Kasai, under Maibisi's orders, prepared to strike at the Rakus' hidden fortress of Vaitaku. In Tapuroku, Maibisi had commanded the Kasai after thorough studying Kasai lore and sending the Ganguun Priests into locating the marks as it was slowly being rediscovered. Horrified, the Rakus warriors had to return to Vaitaku, only to find that the Kasai had already attacked, conquered, and perhaps slaughtered the other Rakus' warriors. Maibisi also revealed that he gave up his heart and encased it in a crimson stone crystal to ensure his immortality.

After fending off the Kasai threat, the Oracle told them to locate the child, Rau's younger sister Tati, who has the remaining Mark of Kri, and plant the Oracle seed in the city of N'gari so that humanity can still commune with the Gods themselves. After locating Rau and Tati, when they were children in the Ruins of Tiru, They rescued Tati and disappeared from the sight of the Kasai, much to Maibisi's fury and dismay. Baumusu and Griz were told not to reveal Tati's value with the Mark of Kri on her back to the enemy, raise them, and train Rau and in turn, Rau would train Tati so that they can become the Rakus' protective warriors and that Rau can fulfill his destiny one day.

During the events of The Mark of Kri, further revelations came when Griz rushed for three days back to the Inn where Baumusu, Rongo, the Innkeeper, and Tati (when she was 10 years old) were, to warn Baumusu on the imminent attack on their home, but had arrived too late as Griz was captured by the Kasai during the ambush, presumably rotted inside dungeon of the palace of Yolo Maibisi and Rau's journey into Meifiti to rescue the boy, as he was lured away by the Ganguun Priest himself, before returning to the devastated Inn along with a dying Baumusu, and chasing after and defeating the Necromancer to save Tati at Ratuthusai. In the aftermath, Rau and Tati now a grown woman, 20 years later, were informed that Griz was still alive as Tati assumed that he died along with Baumusu during the ambush.

But before they attempt to rescue Griz, they first went to N'gari to learn more about their destiny and the mark on Tati's back. The Oracle revealed as part of Rau's destiny that he was one of the last of the Rakus, and warned Tati to beware of the temptation that came with her curse, that the mark was evil and would seek to manipulate her. They then, as instructed by the Oracle, went after the marks containing the evil spells that would awaken Kri, the evil Lord of the Kasai, beginning with a confrontation with one of the Ganguun Priests, as it was revealed that not only Maibisi and the Kasai wanted the marks, including Tati's, but the Ganguun Priests not only wanted the mark, but retribution for the Necromancer's death at Rau's own hands. After securing the other marks from Mt. Basuku and Iguahatu, ensuring that they were protected, they now decide to rescue Griz. In the dungeon, Rau and Tati found a nearly dying Griz, they were informed of Maibisi's grand scheme of using Tati as part of the plan. It was now revealed that the Rakus' original plan was to have a Queen to unify the Three Kingdoms against the Kasai, but what Griz failed to mention was that the Queen could unify the land either for Good or Evil, that would be up to her to decide. Now, the Kasai attempted to use Tati and turn against the Rakus by betraying Rau.

After countless battles against the Kasai, as well as the Ganguun Priests in Daiharu and Rututeihuru, they would finally confront Maibisi at the Heart of Evil itself, Haasa. And after a long banter between him and Tati with Maibisi explaining his agenda from his viewpoint (such as that the Rakus warning him that the marks were evil, as the Rakus, stood steadfast in their faith, stripped Maibisi of his rank. In retaliation, Maibisi informed the Kasai on where and when to strike at the Rakus' hidden fortress of Vaitaku, but that tale was told from the Rakus' and Kuzo's point of view) when he argued that they could use the spells for themselves and that the Rakus refused to do so cementing his further hatred for the Rakus and dabbling in the Kasai arts. Maibisi first tempted Tati that it was it was their destiny, as Maibisi's is to free a God, and Tati's was to unite the Three Kingdoms under the Kasai and rule by Kri's side, he then offered Tati a choice which would affect her destiny, as it would be there that the player would have two options for Tati to decide:

(A. Full-Circle (Bad Ending)): If Tati chooses to betray Rau, she would side with Maibisi and kill Rau, bringing his death full-circle.

(B. Tati's Chosen Path (Good Ending)): If Tati chooses not to betray Rau, she would choose her own path, wherever it will lead as she and Rau would defeat the Kri possessed Maibisi by its weakness, Maibisi's own heart encased in a crimson crystal, and kill him, finally bringing the Kasai's hold of the Three Kingdoms to an end.

In the aftermath, Kuzo narrates "I still have more to tell, but am weary so must leave that for another day" for Tati's destiny either for Good or Evil as the game closes.

== Gameplay ==
Gameplay consists of thirteen levels, in which the player, accompanied by a computer-controlled ally, must battle numerous enemies to progress through the story. Much like its predecessor, the combat system of Rise of the Kasai revolves around the use of Focus Beams, a gameplay mechanic used to lock on to single or multiple enemies from any direction.

While the DualShock 2's left analog stick is used to maneuver the character, a sweep of the right analog stick will cause a beam of light to extend from the player's character. When this beam of light comes into contact with an enemy, an attack icon will be assigned to them. Attack icons are symbols that appear over the enemy's head and correspond with the X, square, and circle buttons on the controller. When an attack icon is assigned, the player can press the corresponding button to initiate a focused attack.

Baumusu locked on to multiple enemies.

This attack will vary depending on distance and the direction that the character is facing in relation to the focused enemy. When only one or two different attack icons are in use, the free buttons becomes a modifier that can be used to chain together attack combinations. In addition, some of these attack combos can lead to an instant kill if done correctly.

While players may spend a majority of the game fighting enemies head on, there are many occasions where the player has the option to employ stealth tactics to avoid detection and quietly ambush the enemy. A stealth kill can be performed by sheathing the character's weapon and using the focus beam to assign a flashing attack icon onto an unsuspecting enemy. The player will be able to initiate a stealth kill once the enemy is in range and the attack icon becomes solid.

To help remain undetected, the player can send out a spirit guide to a certain key-point to scope the environment ahead and monitor enemy positions, armaments, and patrol patterns. Using a spirit guide to scout ahead can also allow the player to devise battle strategies if stealth is not an option. Spirit guides vary between the four protagonists. Rau and Baumusu use Kuzo, a spiritual familiar that takes the form of a blackbird, as their spirit guide. Kuzo can be sent to various perches throughout the level to scout ahead. Tati and Griz summon the souls of the dead to scout ahead from the various corpses that litter the environment.

== Audio ==
Rise of the Kasai's musical score was composed by Jack Wall, Rod Abernethy, Jason Graves, and Mike Reagan with instruments provided by Michael Masley and Mr. Lee Vang.

== Reception ==
Reception

Aggregate scores
Aggregator	Score
GameRankings	70.65%
Metacritic	68/100

Review scores
Publication	Score
Edge	6/10
Electronic Gaming Monthly	6.33/10
Game Informer	7/10
GamePro	3.5/5
GameRevolution	C
GameSpot	6.8/10
GameSpy	3.5/5
GameTrailers	7.7/10
GameZone	8.3/10
IGN	7.8/10
Official U.S. PlayStation Magazine	3.5/5
Detroit Free Press	3/4
Maxim	6/10

Rise of the Kasai received mixed to positive reviews from critics, as GameRankings gave it a score of 70.65%, while Metacritic gave it 68 out of 100. While many critics praised the game's combat system, control scheme, and distinctive cinematics, others panned the game due to repetitious gameplay while expressing disappointment in the game's AI and lack of multiplayer options.

Despite the mixed reception, the Academy of Interactive Arts & Sciences did nominate Rise of the Kasai in the categories of "Outstanding Achievement in Animation" and "Outstanding Achievement in Original Musical Composition" during the 9th Annual Interactive Achievement Awards.
