= Ultimate Ride =

2001 video game

- Developer: Gigawatt Studios
- Publisher: Disney Interactive
- Composer: Jack Wall
- Platform: Microsoft Windows
- Release: NA: September 26, 2001
- Genre: Simulation video game

Ultimate Ride is a 2001 simulation game developed by Gigawatt Studios and published by Disney Interactive for Microsoft Windows in which players design, engineer and ride virtual roller coasters.

== Development and release ==
It was released on September 26, 2001, alongside a website, by Walt Disney Imagineering, for members to upload and share their designs and rate rides based on Adrenaline, Technique and Originality. Designers of each week's five top-rated rides were awarded "Roller God" titles.

Two sequels "Ultimate Ride Coaster Deluxe" and "Disney Coaster" were released in 2002 added new features and design elements. The website closed in 2003.

== Reception ==
Reception

Aggregate score
Aggregator	Score
Metacritic	68/100

Review scores
Publication	Score
Computer Games Magazine	3/5
Computer Gaming World	3/5
GameRevolution	D
GameSpot	7.5/10
GameSpy	75%
GameZone	8.4/10
IGN	7.8/10
Jeuxvideo.com	12/20
Next Generation	3/5
PC Gamer (US)	73%

The game received "average" reviews according to the review aggregation website Metacritic. Eric Bratcher of NextGen said of the game, "It's slightly under-ambitious, but this is one ride that you should definitely consider taking." Bad Hare of GamePro said, "Ultimate Ride succeeds where Rollercoaster Tycoon [sic] and even Sim Theme Park failed---it gives you the true sensation of riding a rollercoaster, the logical tools to build them, and the ability to show your work quickly and easily. If you're just looking for a creative adrenaline rush without a lot of hassles, check out Ultimate Ride." (Note: GamePro gave the game two 4/5 scores for graphics and fun factor, and two 3.5/5 scores for sound and control.)
