= Fatal Abyss =

1998 video game

- Developer: The Human Software Co.
- Publisher: SegaSoft
- Platform: Windows
- Release: NA: November 9, 1998
- Genre: Action
- Modes: Single-player, multiplayer

Fatal Abyss is a 1998 action game developed by The Human Software Co., published by SegaSoft for Microsoft Windows.

== Reception ==
Reception

Aggregate score
Aggregator	Score
GameRankings	52%

Review scores
Publication	Score
Computer Games Strategy Plus	2/5
Computer Gaming World	3.5/5
GameRevolution	D
GameSpot	5.6/10
IGN	5.3/10
PC Accelerator	6/10
PC Gamer (US)	24%

The game received mixed reviews according to the review aggregation website GameRankings.

== Description ==
The game is set in a distant future during a war over Bacteria 241, a peculiar new source of energy from the bottom of the ocean. Scientists from company Eco Systems developed a method of extracting energy from Bacteria 241, but renegades from Proteus Tech want to control the harvesting of this substance. In the beginning of the game, you will choose which of these two factions to support as they battle for dominance.

It is a 3D combat game, taking place entirely underwater. It can be played from the first or third person perspective, and contains no resource management or puzzles. You will choose one of three submarines, then set out equipped with 2D relief view and sonar maps to see enemies, obstacles, structures as you blast them out of your path. Your submarine is equipped with defensive and offensive equipment, including missiles and flares. The game has 24 missions and 7 maps to complete.

Multiplayer functionality is possible via LAN connection, and was previously available via the now defunct Heat.net.
