= SkyDrift =

2011 video game

- Developers: Digital Reality; THQ Nordic (Infinity)
- Publishers: Digital Reality; Bandai Namco Partners (Xbox 360); HandyGames (Infinity)
- Platforms: Nintendo Switch; PlayStation 3 (PSN); PlayStation 4; Windows; Xbox 360 (XBLA); Xbox One
- Release: PlayStation 3: NA: September 6, 2011; PAL: September 7, 2011; Xbox 360: WW: September 7, 2011; Windows: WW: November 21, 2011; Infinity; Nintendo Switch, PlayStation 4, Windows, Xbox One: WW: July 29, 2021
- Genre: Arcade racing
- Modes: Single-player, Multiplayer

SkyDrift is a 2011 airplane racing video game developed by Digital Reality. It was self-published by the developer on the Microsoft Windows and PlayStation 3 platforms. The Xbox 360 version was published by Bandai Namco Partners.

The game features multiple game modes which are primarily focused on combat racing. Two downloadable content packs have been released which add additional planes and two new game modes. The game was well received, with aggregate scores ranging in the mid-to-high 70% range. Critics generally felt that the gameplay was strong, that the controls were responsive, and that the online multiplayer was excellent, though multiple reviewers cited disappointment in the lack of any local multiplayer.

A remaster of the game called SkyDrift Infinity was released by HandyGames on July 29, 2021.

== Gameplay ==
SkyDrift is an airplane racing game with a heavy emphasis on combat.

In SkyDrift players pilot one of several airplanes in a fictional racing competition. Gameplay is similar to other airplane racing games such as Plane Crazy and the flight mode of Diddy Kong Racing. The game features 33 single player challenge stages as well as online multiplayer. While the primary focus is racing, dogfights play a large part in some of SkyDrift's game modes. Players are rewarded with boost, which provides a temporary burst of speed, by flying acrobatically, low to the ground, or by taking down opponents. Planes and their separate liveries are unlocked as players progress and complete specified challenges. As players progress on a given course they are sometimes presented with progressing environment hazards such as falling rocks or an avalanche.

Three game modes are included with the game, with two more available via downloadable content. The first game mode, Power Race, is a hybrid of both racing and combat. Players can collect powerups to give their planes different abilities. These abilities include such things as missiles, machine guns, mines, or an EMP blast. The goal is to use whatever means necessary to achieve the highest finishing rank at the end of a given race. The second mode is focused solely on racing. Entitled Speed Race, this mode omits all weapons and powerups. In their place are rings scattered throughout the course. Flying through these rings provides the plane with an extra burst of speed, and flying through multiple in succession will multiply that speed. As with Power Race the goal is to finish the race in as high a rank as possible.

The third mode included with the game is known as Survivor. Gameplay is similar to Power Race, however after a given time the racer in last place is eliminated. Powerups are included in this mode and can be used to increase one's place, thus avoiding elimination. The race is over when all human players are eliminated or a human player is takes first place. The two downloadable modes, Deathmatch and Team Deathmatch, are focused solely on dogfights with other players. These modes are played in three new arenas and are limited to online gameplay.

== Development and marketing ==
The developers said that they wanted to keep a certain amount of realism to the setting of their game. Senior Game Designer Peter Petrekovits described the game's direction as "not a science fiction, but a racing on the most beautiful places on earth". Development began with low polygon versions of the game's three settings to hone gameplay, which were later upgraded with details created from primitive shapes. Artists then took these settings and provided finalized environments while course designers laid out the specific elements to each race. Multiple routes were created in each setting allowing for several course configurations. Some of the plane designs were inspired from real-world fighter planes, but each were evolved from initial concept art into their current designs. Petrekovits elaborated on their design: "These planes are not real life models. You might see some part[s] of them [that are] familiar, but these are whole new concepts". Petrekovits further clarified that though the planes can be equipped with weaponry via powerups, they "are not military planes whatsoever, [they] are racing planes". Two members of the game's development team were graduate airplane technicians.

Two downloadable content packs have been released, both of which are actually included in the main game but require premium unlock keys to be accessed. The first, entitled Extreme Fighters Pack, was released on September 21, 2011 and adds three additional planes, the Vanguard, Sparrow X1 and Triwing Vintage. The first two planes feature a design similar to modern day fighter jets, while the latter focuses on older, Red Baron-style planes such as the triplane. The second pack, entitled Gladiator Pack brings six new combat arenas into the game. These new levels have a focus entirely on dogfights, and have all racing aspects removed.

== Reception ==
Reception

Aggregate score
Aggregator	Score		
Aggregator	PC	PS3	Xbox 360
Metacritic	73/100	76/100	77/100

Review scores
Publication	Score		
Publication	PC	PS3	Xbox 360
Destructoid	N/A	N/A	7.5/10
Eurogamer	N/A	N/A	7/10
GamePro	N/A	4/5	4/5
GameSpot	N/A	7/10	7/10
GameSpy	3/5	N/A	N/A
GameZone	N/A	8/10	8/10
IGN	N/A	8/10	8/10
PlayStation Official Magazine – Australia	N/A	8/10	N/A
PlayStation Official Magazine – UK	N/A	7/10	N/A
Official Xbox Magazine (US)	N/A	N/A	8.5/10
411Mania	N/A	N/A	7.5/10
The Digital Fix	N/A	N/A	8/10

The PlayStation 3 and Xbox 360 versions of SkyDrift received "generally favorable reviews", while the PC version received "average" reviews, according to the review aggregation website Metacritic. According to Gamasutra's analysis SkyDrift moved over 5,100 units on the Xbox 360 and 4,700 units on the PlayStation 3 during the month of its release. The Xbox 360 version moved over 7,500 units as of year-end 2011.

The game's visuals were well received by critics. IGN reviewer Stephanie Lee lauded the visuals. She stated that the graphics are "beautiful detail and [have] a warm color palette". Robert Workman of GameZone also gave high marks for SkyDrift's graphics. He felt that the planes were well modeled and that the environments provided "a smooth looking package". GameSpot's Sean Evans called the graphics "visually striking, with impressive levels of detail". He did cite occasional issues with locating powerups, which he attributed to "overly saturated lighting effects". The game's soundtrack was a point of mediocrity among critics. IGN's Lee stated that SkyDrift's soundtrack "doesn't stand out nor does it detract from the overall experience", a sentiment shared with GameZone's Workman.

Gameplay was also well received. Eurogamer's Kristan Reed noted that the Xbox 360 version's "controls are spot-on, and it's easy to pick up". Reed, however, felt that the game can lose its luster for some players quickly due to the repeated environments used throughout the game. Terry Terrones of GamePro stated that the game was "the definition of easy to play and tough to master". GameSpot's Evans noted that the game's online multiplayer was "lag free" and was the game's "shining jewel", but expressed disappointment with the fact that it did not feature a local multiplayer. IGN's Lee also praised the online multiplayer, but was disappointed in the lack of local play. She did concede, however, that during single player events "the A.I. still knows how to throw down".

== See also ==
- Plane Crazy (a similar game released in 1998)
