= Lose Your Marbles =

1997 video game

- Developer: SegaSoft
- Publisher: SegaSoft
- Platform: Windows
- Release: NA: August 19, 1997; EU: 1998
- Genre: Puzzle
- Modes: Single-player, multiplayer

Lose Your Marbles is a puzzle video game developed and published by SegaSoft and released for Microsoft Windows on August 19, 1997.

A version of the game was included in Microsoft Plus! 98.

== Gameplay ==
In Lose Your Marbles, the player moves each color of marbles to create matches on the playing field, while the game drops new ones every few seconds. Whether played against a human or the CPU, the goal in Lose Your Marbles is to fill the other player's board with marbles. Creating matches of three, four, or five marbles clears those marbles from the player's board. In addition, a match of five will send marbles to the opposing player's board.

Due to its simplistic controls, Lose Your Marbles can be played with two players with one keyboard. Lose Your Marbles also features a LAN multiplayer mode to connect two players over a local network.

== Release ==
A tag saying "Better than Tetris or your money back!" appeared on the first edition of the game. SegaSoft offered a full refund for purchasers who did not enjoy the game more than Tetris.

== Reception ==
Reception

Review scores
Publication	Score
CNET Gamecenter	9/10
Computer Games Strategy Plus	3.5/5
Computer Gaming World	4.5/5
GameRevolution	B−
GameSpot	7.2/10
Next Generation	3/5
PC Gamer (UK)	66%
PC Gamer (US)	88%

The game received favorable reviews. GamePro lauded the game as "one of the most addictive PC games to come out in recent memory", giving it a 4.5 out of 5 for graphics, sound, and control, and a perfect 5 for fun factor. Nicole Freeman of GameSpot said that the AI is easy to defeat, making single-player mode too lacking in longevity, though she acknowledged that the multiplayer mode is much more fun and long-lasting. She concluded, "It's no Baku Baku, but Lose Your Marbles is not a total loss." Next Generation found the single player mode sufficiently challenging, but agreed that the multiplayer is much better, and stated that "Lose Your Marbles is actually quite fun, even if it doesn't grab players quite like Tetris or have the same staying power."

The game was a runner-up for Computer Gaming World's 1997 "Puzzle Game of the Year" award, which ultimately went to Smart Games Challenge 2. The staff called the former "the best Tetris clone we've seen since last year's winner, Baku Baku." The game won the "Best Arcade Game" award at the CNET Gamecenter Awards for 1997.
