= Vigilance (video game) =

1998 video game

- Developers: Postlinear Entertainment; Any Channel
- Publisher: SegaSoft
- Composer: Jack Wall
- Platform: Microsoft Windows
- Release: October 21, 1998
- Genre: Third-person shooter
- Modes: Single-player, multiplayer

Vigilance is a third-person shooter developed by Postlinear Entertainment and Any Channel and released by SegaSoft in 1998 for the PC.

== Plot ==
The single player campaign followed eight agents working for the counter-terrorist organization SION (Special Intelligence Operations Network).

== Gameplay ==
The game combines first and third person perspective, allowing the player to control one of eight SION agents each with varied strengths and weaknesses. Aside from the basic single player mode, it also came with a support of play over LAN and Heat.net.

== Development ==
The project took over two years and $2 million to create. The game was SegaSoft's first venture into 3D shooters. It runs on the AnyWorld game engine, which was designed by AnyChannel. The designs for the player characters were intentionally generic and familiar, since the developers felt that when playing an action-based game on the Internet, gamers would want to immediately understand their selection of characters so that they could jump right in. The environments were created with off-the-shelf 3D software such as 3D Studio Max.

The developers intended to make stealth a major aspect of the game, designing certain areas to be too difficult for players to fight their way through.

== Reception ==
Vigilance was mostly met with mixed reviews. While GameSpot complained largely on slow access times requiring heavy resources from computers, the gameplay was praised for large variety of weapons at the time and moderately sized levels; the game was given a final score of 5/10. A review by GamePro gave the game 3.5 stars out of 5, praising the games creative and feature-rich, but criticized oversights and annoyances, mentioning the game required more play testing.
