= Guild Wars Nightfall =

2006 video game

- Developer: ArenaNet
- Publisher: NCSOFT
- Series: Guild Wars
- Platform: Windows
- Release: NA: October 26, 2006 (retail); EU: October 27, 2006; NA: April 22, 2009 (Steam)
- Genre: Action role-playing game
- Mode: Multiplayer

Guild Wars Nightfall is a fantasy action role-playing game and the third stand-alone campaign in the Guild Wars series developed by ArenaNet, a subsidiary of NCSOFT corporation. Nightfall was released worldwide on October 27, 2006, having been in development alongside Guild Wars Factions since November 2005.

Nightfall takes place in the continent of Elona in the Guild Wars universe. It follows the player character as they join the Order of the Sunspears and uncover the desire of Warmarshal Varesh to return a long forgotten god to the world through an event called Nightfall. The players, assisted by their hero allies, fight through civil war, ignorant Vabbi princes and Varesh's demon allies as they attempt to prevent the coming of Nightfall.

A rerelease of the original game titled Guild Wars Reforged, which includes all content from Guild Wars Factions and Guild Wars Nightfall was released on December 3, 2025. The game will be released on mobile platforms on June 24th, 2026.

== Gameplay ==
Nightfall is a continuation of the Guild Wars franchise and so follows the same gameplay principles. Guild Wars in previous releases attempted a marriage of Player versus Environment (or "PvE") and Player versus Player (or "PvP") gameplay, starting out with PvP being the logical endgame for the Prophecies campaign, and PvP optionally interspersed throughout Factions play. Nightfall moves away from this as the storyline is more PvE focused than previous campaigns.

=== Professions ===
A player with Guild Wars Nightfall may create a character from one of the six core professions from Prophecies or one of the Nightfall-specific professions:

- The Dervish, described as a "holy warrior", wields a scythe and uses many different enchantments to support themselves and damage their enemies. They have the ability to temporarily transform into the likeness, or "form", of the Five Gods. They have higher base HP than any other profession.
- The Paragon wields a spear and acts as a battle commander. Heavily armored, they are a support character capable of helping teammates through the use of "shouts" and chants, which affect all nearby allies.

The Assassin and Ritualist can only be created through the Guild Wars Factions campaign. If a person owns both campaigns, Assassin and Ritualists can travel to participate in Guild Wars Nightfall; but they cannot be created in Guild Wars Nightfall.

=== Heroes ===
In previous campaigns players could use NPC Henchmen with predetermined sets of skills to assist them with their questing. New henchmen available through Nightfall and Guild Wars: Eye of the North are called Heroes. Heroes are customizable in that the player can select skills, armor upgrades and weapons for them. The player also has a degree of control over the actions of the heroes: the player can set map waypoints for them, controlling the type of AI they use and directing the skills they use. Heroes are unlocked through play and can be taken into PvE areas. A new PvP arena was available specifically for players to fight each other with their Heroes but has since been removed. Heroes can be acquired by all characters (Tyrian, Canthan, Elonan) and used in battle if the player has a Nightfall or Eye of the North account. Additionally, each other campaign has a hero available to add to Nightfall (an assassin for Factions, and a necromancer for Prophecies).

=== PvE gameplay ===
As with the other Guild Wars campaigns, the maximum level for all characters is twenty. Nightfall strikes a middle ground with the other Guild Wars campaigns with the amount of time spent leveling; faster than Prophecies, where much of the game is spent achieving level 20, but slower than Factions where level 20 is very quickly achieved.

New PvE-only skills have been introduced available by gaining ranks in titles. The "Sunspear Rebirth Signet" is available by reaching a certain rank in the Sunspear Rank track, and each profession has been given a special Sunspear skill that increases in power as the player's Sunspear Rank increases. "Lightbringer's Gaze" and "Lightbringer's Signet" are available upon reaching level 2 and level 3 in the Lightbringer track, respectively (these skills also power up as the player's Lightbringer Rank increases). Also, wearing the skill title "Lightbringer" increases damage done to certain creatures in the PvE environment. Gaining higher ranks in the Sunspear and Lightbringer titles also awards players with hero skill points, which can be used to unlock new skills for themselves and their heroes to use; while buying skills with regular skill points (earned by levelling up and completing missions) can still be used to gain new skills, this method only allows you to unlock skills from the player's chosen professions; using hero skill points allows you to unlock skills from any profession.

Further benefits of title tracks have also been integrated into the game since; for example, the player's ranks in the Lucky/Unlucky (gained by playing various in-game gambling activities) and Treasure Hunter (gained by attaining "rare" items from chests) title tracks aid the player's chances of lockpicks not breaking when opening chests and reducing the chances of an item being destroyed when salvaging upgrade components (such as runes, which increase attributes).

PvE has been expanded when compared to the previous chapters; some parts of the game draw parallels to single player RPGs such as Knights of the Old Republic or Baldur's Gate. For example, the player has to undertake a certain Nightfall mission alone, without the use of Heroes, henchmen, or other players. The mission requires very little combat and actually consists of a series of mini-games. Another example is a mini-mission that involves the player acting as a lawyer in a court case, where choosing the right line of argument will alter the outcome of the trial. The ability for the player to choose a course of action brings the game closer to its offline counterparts as opposed to the linear mission structure in other Action RPGs, as well as Guild Wars Prophecies and Factions.

The addition of Heroes has also made the game similar to single player RPGs, as most Heroes have their own side quests the player can complete if they choose. Depending on which Hero you bring on quests, they make different comments on the current situation, whether remarking about ease of enemies during battle or random comments while standing around. Heroes also allow more freedom when playing as a single player with only computer controlled party members since they can be given more commands than ordinary henchmen and their skills can be tailored to specific situations. The addition of commands and customization makes many challenges that would have required other human players without Heroes possible. The hero system has also led to many Guild Wars players highly recommending Nightfall as a good starter campaign for newcomers to the game, as it encourages more strategic thinking and also makes playing PvE more straightforward (as especially in the earlier stages of the game, heroes may be of a higher level than henchmen and offer a better degree of survivability). This advice is not always sound since Heroes need to be equipped (which can be very costly) and their skills need to be unlocked (except for their starter skills).

Mission structure has also changed somewhat. Like in Factions, bonus rewards are dependent on the performance during the mission, not just one side quest; however, the bonus could depend on something like killing certain creatures or preventing others from dying. For all but the last two missions, a certain hero must be in the party before the mission can begin. There are three pairs of missions where either one or the other must be completed before the plot progresses. Two of these pairs are selected depending on which hero was added to the party early on, while the third mission split offers a choice to the player. All the missions can be completed at the appropriate place in the plot, either depending on other players or by waiting until the plot has been completed (at which point players may gain all the heroes that they had previously chosen not to take).

=== PvP gameplay ===
Prior to the release of Nightfall, ArenaNet announced the PvP Editions of the campaigns they have released. This made Nightfall the first campaign where players could have access to the skills and PvP parts of the campaign without having to play or pay for the PvE parts of the game. A player interested in PvP gains access to the core PvP content, 300 new skills for the Nightfall campaign, new guild halls and a new type of Arena.

Nightfall introduced an all new type of PvP Arena called Hero Battles. In this Arena, a player chooses three of their heroes to join them in combat against another player and three of their heroes. Each player chose the skills each of their heroes use, and micromanage how they used those skills in the Arena. Players also used way point flags and micromanaged hero targeting to order heroes to capture/defend specific points or attack specific targets. These hero battles created a new international tournament for solo players; previously, the only formal tournament was in the form of Guild vs Guild matches, which requires teams of eight players. However, Hero Battles were removed from the game following controversy regarding a quest in which the player had to win Hero Battles to gain a reward; players were assigned either Red or Blue in the battle, and when this game became a part of a quest the "Red Resign rule" was implemented. This rule had the Red player resign from the battle, giving the Blue player an automatic win in order for the reward to be easily gained. ArenaNet observed this occurring and, after warning players they would be banned for fixing match results, removed the Arena from play.

== Plot ==
The player character is recruited as a junior officer in Elona's independent guardian force, the Order of the Sunspears - they are led by their Spearmarshal, Kormir. The player quickly earns respect and rank in the Sunspears dealing with unusual occurrences around Istan, where the headquarters of the Sunspears is located.

The strange deaths of a dig team excavating a long abandoned city, information about an event called Nightfall and its ties to the return of a forgotten fallen god, Abaddon, start to cause concern for the Sunspears. Evidence builds that a delegation from the nation of Kourna, which is conveniently visiting the Sunspears, are behind these unusual happenings. When the Kournan General, Kahyet, attempts to strike a deal with the corsairs harassing Istan, the Sunspears intervene. Kahyet is killed, plunging cautious relations with Kourna into strife. During a hearing with the elder council, Kormir - who had temporarily left in order to seek allies in Cantha and Tyria - returns, citing that similar occurrences have happened elsewhere.

Realizing the danger in the activities of Warmarshal Varesh Ossa (the current Kournan leader), Kormir convinces the Istan council to cease diplomatic talks and instead start civil war to prevent Varesh from bringing about Nightfall. Rallying the troops the Sunspears sail from Istan to Gandara, the largest fortress in Kourna and Varesh's seat of power, to confront Varesh and bring her to justice. Upon breaking through their heavy defenses, Varesh plays her trump card, summoning the demons of Abaddon which rout the Sunspear troops. Kormir is left for dead as the remaining Sunspears flee through Kourna province.

The character establishes a hidden base of operations in Kourna, rescuing Sunspear prisoners including the now-blind Kormir from the Kournan forces, freeing the region's local centaur tribe, and preventing one of Abaddon's demons from corrupting Kourna's water supply. However these are only stalling tactics as through Varesh's rites Nightfall continues to come closer. With the help of agents from a mysterious Elonian organization called the Order of Whispers, the Sunspears travel to Vabbi to convince the three Princes of the region that Varesh represents a threat to all of Elona. The task proves difficult, as they all believe her intruding forces will protect them from both the Sunspears and other natural threats to Vabbi.

They are ultimately convinced of Varesh's treachery as her forces destroy a nearby temple. Although the princes use the power of Djinn in conjunction with help from the Order of Whispers to protect their people, she has already summoned Abaddon's demons, the Margonites, to fight alongside her own military. The Sunspear's best efforts seem to simply stall the inevitable, as the signs of Abaddon's coming begin to appear throughout Elona. After a Chaos Rift appears and sucks Kormir into the Realm of Torment, a part of the Underworld where only the most wicked souls go, the Sunspears decide they must pursue Varesh into The Desolation to stop her from completing the rites to return Abaddon to the world.

To pursue Varesh to the northern part of The Desolation, where Abaddon's link to the world is the strongest, the players release the undead lord Palawa Joko, a tyrant who at one point waged war against Elona. He reveals to the Sunspears that the only way to traverse the sulfurous wastes is to tame the Junundu - giant desert wurms, one of the few creatures in Elona that can survive the toxic atmosphere. Unlikely an ally as he is, it is he who aids the Sunspears in crossing The Desolation.

The heroes eventually reach Varesh, who is just about to open a rift to the Realm of Torment, and kill her. Unfortunately, it is too late, as the boundaries between both worlds are weak enough to be breached. The only option is to head into the Realm of Torment itself, find Kormir and face the God of Secrets face-to-face. The players cut off the Margonite source of power, the River of Souls, and discover that Abaddon is seeking aid from Dhuum, the god of death before the current god Grenth overthrew him, and Menzies, half-brother to the god Balthazar. They also discover that two of Abaddon's main generals are none other than the Undead Lich and Shiro Tagachi, the primary antagonists from the previous campaigns.

Battling through Titans and Shiro'ken, the players reach the Temple of the Six Gods, a part of the world taken to the Realm of Torment when Abaddon was imprisoned by the five other gods. Before the heroes can ask for the help of the Gods to defeat Abaddon, they must defeat Abaddon's generals, Shiro and the Lich who defend the Temple. After defeating them, Kormir and the players request assistance. Avatars of the Gods appear to say they will not help but to take their blessing "already within the heart of each human". The Sunspears must face and defeat Abaddon alone.

In the final battle, Abaddon is breaking free from the bindings holding him to the Realm of Torment. The Sunspears renew his bindings long enough to inflict enough damage to defeat him. When defeated Abaddon's power grows out of control and his Realm of Torment threatens to merge with Elona causing Nightfall without him. Thinking quickly, Spearmarshal Kormir sacrifices herself by running into the mouth of Abaddon, hoping to control or stop his energies. Kormir is successful and takes the dying God of Secrets' power and is reborn as the Goddess of Truth. Kormir then sets about undoing the damage done to the world by her predecessor. The player may return to the Chantry of Secrets, base of operations for the Order of Whispers and enter the Domain of Anguish.

== Release ==
Pre-release Bonus Pack is similar to the pre-order packs from the previous campaigns, and was available from September 15, 2006. It includes a game trial key, an additional character slot, weapons for the new professions and a CD containing bonus materials.

The Bonus Edition, only purchasable online, has a hard silver case with the title of the game on it. It contains the game, an access key, a manual, and an Exclusive Behind the Scenes DVD. It was only released in Canada.

The standard edition contains the full game, which was released October 27, 2006. It contains three game CDs, a book of game lore, a manual, and a miniature map of Elona. New players will get four character slots while players adding Nightfall to an existing account will get two additional character slots. In Europe, the standard edition was also released on a single DVD-ROM.

The Collector's Edition has the same content as the standard edition but is also known to include a behind-the-scenes DVD, unique Dervish and Paragon in-game emotes, a Varesh Ossa Minipet (Miniature NPC that follows the player), an art book, skill pins, a Varesh Ossa mini-standee, a map of Elona, a code to unlock extra in-game music and the Nightfall soundtrack CD. It also gives you a "Nightfall Buddy Key" to give to one of your friends. The Nightfall Buddy Key allows your friend to play Nightfall for 14 days or 10 hours (whichever ends first) without purchase.

The Edition/PvP Pack edition unlocks all of the skills and professions which come with Nightfall for use in PvP. It does not allow the player to access the Nightfall PvE content and the player must unlock weapon upgrades and Heroes. The PvP edition is only available for purchase online.

== Reception ==
Reception

Aggregate scores
| Aggregator | Score |
|---|---|
| GameRankings | 84.20% |
| Metacritic | 84/100 |

Review scores
| Publication | Score |
|---|---|
| Eurogamer | 7/10 |
| GameSpot | 8.2/10 |
| GameSpy | 4/5 |
| IGN | 8.4/10 |
| Play.tm | 92% |

Guild Wars Nightfall was well received. While the reviews were favorable, it has been rated less favourably by reviewers when compared to other Guild Wars campaigns, Factions and the original, Prophecies. It received a score of 84.20% on GameRankings and 84/100 on Metacritic.

As the third game in the Guild Wars series, reviewers expected more from the game, for instance, GameSpot noted "the underlying game hasn't changed much and is starting to show signs of aging." Despite this, Guild Wars Nightfall was widely recommended as the best game in the series for new players to start in., and some extend this to say it is the strongest offering in the Guild Wars series.

Heroes were viewed by many as a significant gameplay modification introduced by Nightfall. Heroes were commended for allowing the player more flexibility and choice in the game, but were also felt to be a mixed blessing because, unlike henchmen, heroes require micro-management, and often take slots in the party which might normally be filled by human players. Many commented that it seemed that the game was now more solo player focused than previous installments, Eurogamer suggested heroes bring "Guild Wars closer to the party-based RPGs of old ... instead of the solo-but-with-people RPG that it had initially delivered."

There were few Nightfall specific complaints. Several critics noted that existing characters from previous campaigns had to grind for Sunspear points to advance the storyline. This grinding for non-Elonian characters has since been removed. Others noted that for Elona-made characters the story starts slowly, only really starting once the point where existing characters may join the story has passed.

Some reviewers mentioned issues with the Guild Wars games in general. Several noted that while some modifications have been made to the interfaces, that other interfaces in the game were still lacking, for instance Yahoo! opined, "the chat and player-info features are rudimentary, and you only meet other players when you're in a town." It was also felt that Guild Wars is becoming an increasingly complex game due to the vast number of skill interactions.

=== Awards ===
Guild Wars Nightfall has received several game awards. 1UP.com awarded Nightfall the best Online/Multiplayer Game of 2006. The editors of PC Gamer US presented Nightfall with their 2006 "Best MMO" and "Best Value" awards. The Academy of Interactive Arts & Sciences awarded Guild Wars Nightfall with "Massively Multiplayer Game of the Year" at the 10th Annual Interactive Achievement Awards.
