= Guild Wars (video game) =

2005 video game

- Developer: ArenaNet
- Publishers: WW: NCSoft; BR: Level Up! Games
- Designers: Mike O'Brien; James Phinney
- Series: Guild Wars
- Platforms: Microsoft Windows; iOS; Android
- Release: April 28, 2005; December 3, 2025 (Guild Wars Reforged); June 24, 2026 (Mobile)
- Genres: Massively multiplayer online, action role-playing
- Mode: Multiplayer

Guild Wars is an online rpg developed by ArenaNet, a subsidiary of South Korean game publisher NCSOFT, and released in 2005. As the original instalment of the Guild Wars series, its campaign was retroactively retitled Guild Wars: Prophecies to differentiate it from the content of subsequent releases. The game contains a co-operative role-playing portion and a competitive Player versus Player (PvP) portion. In PvP, players may use either their co-operative characters or PvP-exclusive characters who are inherently maximum level and have account-based access to unlocked content.

A rerelease of the game titled Guild Wars Reforged, with modern enhancements such as upgraded visuals and audio, a redesigned high-DPI–friendly interface, a new quest-tracking system, and full modern controller support was released on December 3, 2025. The game was also released on mobile platforms on June 24th, 2026.

== Gameplay ==
Players use a 3D avatar to interact with the world around them. The game predominantly features a third-person perspective but also has the option of first-person. These characters are able to walk/run and interact with other characters through chat. They can also perform actions such as fighting and picking up objects, as well as interacting with special objects.

=== Character creation ===
Players can choose from a range of up to ten different professions. When creating a character, players can select their hair style, face, skin tone, height and avatar name—the selection depending upon that profession chosen. As the player progresses through the game, they can unlock different armor and weapons to alter the visual appearance of that avatar. They can also decide whether they want their avatar to start in a Player vs. Environment world (the RPG aspect of the game), or get right into the competitive Player vs. Player and fight live against other players in the game.

The maximum level for character development is capped at 20 - by this point, the character will also have reached 170 attribute points. Players may also choose to do certain quests to gain another 30 attribute points, making the maximum points available 200. Experience can still be gained and is used to learn more skills or buy consumable items throughout the game.

=== Professions ===
A profession is a type of class, central to the gameplay in Guild Wars. Each profession has an array of attributes and skills that help narrow a class's proficiency in order to perform a customized role that is determined by the player. The Warrior profession, for example, has access to the primary Strength attribute that increases their armor penetration with martial weapons, and is able to wear heavy armor providing the highest protection against physical damage of all professions. Elementalists, on the other hand, wear less protective armor, but can use their primary Energy Storage attribute to give them a much greater pool of energy than other professions.

Guild Wars also introduces the ability to choose a secondary profession, expanding the selection of attributes and skills. A character does not, however, have access to the primary attribute of its secondary profession. Many, but not all, skills become more powerful with more points in a class's primary attribute. A Warrior/Elementalist, therefore, is a warrior who may use spells in combat, although the Elementalist spells used will generally not have as much power as those of a primary Elementalist. This is increased by the fact that runes, which among other things increase attribute levels, can only increase the attribute levels associated with a player's primary profession.

There are over a thousand skills in the game that can be acquired by the character over time, but players may only use and equip up to 8 of them at any one time. This introduces levels of strategy, in which one must have a careful selection of skills that work well with one another and with teammates in order to survive.

The core professions are Warrior, Monk, Elementalist, Ranger, Necromancer and Mesmer. The Assassin and Ritualist professions are exclusive to Guild Wars: Factions, which can be played along with the aforementioned core professions. The Paragon and Dervish professions are exclusive to Guild Wars: Nightfall, and can also be played with the core professions. Unlike the campaigns, Guild Wars: Eye of the North does not offer any new playable professions.

=== Environment ===
The Guild Wars universe consists of persistent staging zones known as towns and outposts. These areas normally contain non-player characters that provide services such as merchandising or storage. Other NPC's provide quests and present rewards to adventurers. These areas are also used when forming groups of people to go out into the world and play cooperatively. Players that venture out from the staging area and into an explorable area are then able to use their weapons and skills to defeat monsters and interact with other objects in the game. As players progress through the game, they gain access to additional staging zones. Players can then transport their characters instantly from one staging area to another using a process commonly referred to as 'map traveling'.

=== Combat ===
Apart from fighting with weapons, skills make up the majority of combat interaction. Each skill has a different effect when used, and fall under many different categories. They can range from offensive skills such as setting foes on fire and defensive skills which include resurrection and healing allies. Enchantments that include giving players extra health points or Hexes that drain the enemy's life and add it to your own make up part of the skill selection in Guild Wars. Attack skills are used in conjunction with weapons to augment the damage that they can deal and cause different side effects (such as knocking people to the ground with a hammer, causing bleeding wounds that deal additional damage over time with a sword, or striking multiple foes with an axe).

Most skills have a governing attribute that determines its power and effect. These attributes are assigned using a number of attribute points.

Guild Wars is similar to collectible card games such as Magic: The Gathering because of the way the different skills interact. While in a town or staging area, a character's skill and attribute selection can be freely modified to construct a "build". Once in a combat zone (such as an explorable area or a PvP arena), the build becomes immutable until the character exits the combat zone and returns to a staging area. Players generally either choose a specific build for a given area or role, or use builds that synergize with the builds of other characters in the party.

A player's ability to help the party is based on the way a player's "build" works. If the skills combine well, such as a hex spell that makes an enemy attack faster and then another one that makes him miss 75% of the time and take damage for each miss, then the build will work effectively.

In PvE, monsters that are slain will generate gold and loot which can be traded or sold to players or NPCs. Unique or rare weapon designs are often found from defeating powerful monsters, or by opening treasure chests.

In PvP, reputation in the form of "faction" is gained based on how well a player performs. "Balthazar faction" is gained by the number of wins that you and your team achieve, and for each unique kill. Most PvP in Guild Wars is fast-paced, while the transition period between games may take longer.

=== Competitive gameplay ===
Player versus Player (PvP) combat in Guild Wars is consensual and team-based. Such combat is restricted to special PvP areas, the majority of which are located on the core area known as The Battle Isles. Individual campaigns also have certain campaign-specific PvP arenas. Players may participate in PvP combat with either their role-playing characters or with characters created specifically for PvP. Characters are rewarded with experience points for victories in competitive battle and the player account also acquires faction points redeemable for in-game rewards. In addition to this victory may also award points which contribute towards completion of character or account based titles.

The following are the competitive modes in Guild Wars:

Random Arena
Four-on-four matches with teams randomly composed from those waiting to enter combat. There are many different arenas with different victory conditions: deathmatch and kill-count.
Codex Arena
Four-on-four matches with player-managed teams. These matches are played in the same areas as the Random Arena with a few exceptions. Each class has a pool of limited amounts of skills to choose from and this pool changes every 6 hours.
Heroes' Ascent
A continuous tournament where players form teams of eight to battle in a sequence of arenas, culminating in the Hall of Heroes whose results are broadcast to all online players in addition to rewarding the victors with high-end loot. Arenas in the Heroes' Ascent tournament include deathmatch, altar-control, and capture-the-relic victory conditions. Victories in the Heroes' Ascent award players with fame points that can be used to determine the rank of the player.
Guild Battles
Two guilds meet in guild halls and stage a tactical battle with the aim of killing the opposing Guild Lord, a well-protected NPC. Victory in guild battles affects the rank of the guild in the global Guild versus Guild (GvG) ladder. GvG is considered the most supported of competitive formats in Guild Wars. In 2005, ArenaNet hosted a Guild Wars World Championship, and in 2006, the Guild Wars Factions Championship was hosted as well. Since then, the Automated Tournament system has become the norm, but smaller 3rd-party tournaments have been hosted, including the Rawr Cup and the Guild Wars Guru cup. The GWWC, GWFC, RawrCup, and GWG Tournament all had real life prizes; the former tournaments had cash prizes, the RawrCup and Guru Tournament had laptops and MP3 players to give away.
Alliance Battles
Guild Wars Factions introduced an arena where twelve players aligned with one of the opposing Kurzick and Luxon factions team up to fight an opposing team to gain new territory for their faction. The twelve player team is composed of three teams with four human players each. The three teams are selected randomly from the teams waiting on each side when the match begins. Alliance Battles grant alliance faction and affect the border between the two factions in the Factions-specific continent of Cantha. The location of the border affects the map in which the battles take place by adding a bias to favor the faction losing the war. Additionally, alliance faction can be contributed to a player's guild (if it is allied with the respective faction), allowing that guild to "control" a town in their faction's territory.
Competitive Missions
Factions also introduced a pair of competitive arenas, named Fort Aspenwood and The Jade Quarry, where randomly assembled teams of 8 players from the opposing factions enact particular events in the Kurzick/Luxon war. Victories in these missions have no global effect, but do grant the players with alliance faction.
Minigame
Minigames are either competitive or cooperative "mini missions" or battles that have no bearing on the plot and do not advance the story line of the Guild Wars campaigns. Most are added to the game during festivals and events.
Hero Battles
Hero Battles was the name given to the mode of PvP known as Hero versus Hero (HvH). In this contest, players would enter the battle with three heroes (fully customizable NPC allies), and fight another player and their team of 3 heroes. A player must have had a named account to participate in Hero Battles. This type of PvP was removed in the October 22nd, 2009 update.

Guild Wars has a continuously running automated tournament system. Players or guilds elect to participate in the tournament by buying in-game tokens using their PvP faction points. The participants are divided randomly into groups of 32 that participate daily in up to six Swiss rounds held on a fixed schedule, and the top eight guilds continue on to a single-elimination tournament. Participants who are unable to field a full team automatically forfeit their round. Success in daily automated tournaments qualifies that particular guild for play in the monthly automated tournament, and the final victors of this tournament earn a number of real and in-game rewards. Players who do not participate in the automated tournament were allowed to place bets on the results of these tournaments for a number of in-game rewards prior to February 2010.

Many competitive matches may be observed by players by means of an observer mode. Important PvP matches such as matches in the Hall of Heroes or between highly rated guilds may be observed (after a delay of fifteen minutes) by others in order to see the tactics used by successful teams and attempt to learn or counter them. Guilds may additionally observe their own Guild Battles for a fixed period of time.

=== Co-operative gameplay ===
Player versus Environment (PvE) missions of Guild Wars use several standard tropes of the MMORPG genre. Players explore the game-world, kill monsters, perform quests and complete missions to earn rewards and advance the story. Rewards include experience points, skill points, skills, gold, faction, reputation and items for the player character. Some of these rewards not only advance the particular character being played at the time, but also unlock features of the game account-wide.

In each campaign the player is involved in a linear story with which they interact by performing a series of primary quests and replayable missions. Quests are given to a player by NPCs via text dialog. As quests and missions are completed, new areas, new quests, and new missions are unlocked for the player's character to access. Missions allow the player character to participate in the major events of the storyline, such as significant battles against the main antagonist. Both quests and missions can feature in-game cut scenes which advance the story and provide context to the actions which follow. Cut scenes are in the third-person, often featuring the party leader's character and revealing elements of the game that the character would not normally be aware of, such as the actions of an antagonist. Players are given the option of skipping the cut scenes if all party members agree upon it.

There are different types of PvE in Guild Wars, and it is advisable to prepare a build to meet the challenges of each type:

Cooperative Mission
Missions that move the game story. These form the backbone of the storyline in each campaign. Each requires a party of 4–8 players (and sometimes NPCs) to complete certain objectives. The party fails the mission if every member dies.
Explorable Area
Unlike cooperative missions, your party can die in explorable areas without grave consequences, and you will be respawned at a "resurrection shrine", but there are exceptions. Explorable areas are where quests are accepted and played out. Unlike a cooperative mission, players can work on several quests at the same time.
Elite Mission
Especially difficult missions, with an 8–12 player party size, that require a high amount of preparation, skill, knowledge and time commitment. Having the correct team build is a must, and players must coordinate with other team members more than normal.
Dungeon
Subterranean explorable areas in the Eye of the North expansion. A quest is given to guide the party through the dungeon, culminating in a boss fight, after which rewards are distributed.
Minigame
Minigames are either competitive or cooperative "mini missions" or battles that have no bearing on the plot of the Guild Wars campaigns. Some are present in the game only during special events, such as the Dragon Arena for the Canthan New Year and Dragon Festival. Rewards offered for competing in these games include tokens which can be traded for prizes
Challenge Mission
A special form of mission that is not part of the main story, in which parties aim to reach a high score. Unlike other forms of PvE play, Challenge Missions can theoretically go on forever, with the difficulty increasing the longer the player or party manages to stay alive.

=== Guilds ===
Guilds are a core element of Guild Wars, manifesting not only as social units but also being closely linked with the game mechanics. Although a player is not required to join a guild, it adds value to the gaming time and increases camaraderie. Often, joining a guild is a good way to get help from more experienced players as the in-game guild interface allows communication between guild members.

A guild leader creates the guild by registering a guild name and a tag (between two and four characters long) with a Guild Registrar, found in some major towns. The guild tag is displayed in brackets after the names of guild members. The leader also designs the guild's cape (from a large palette of shapes, patterns and emblems), and purchases a guild hall that serves as the guild headquarters and may be furnished with merchants, traders, and storage NPCs. Each guild hall is an individual instanced outpost located at the same spot on the Battle Isles, but they are not physically accessible to non-allied members as the only way to enter a guild hall is by "map travel". The guild leader recruits new players to the guild and can promote a number of them to guild officers, who can then help with the recruitment and further promotion of officers. All player characters on the same Guild Wars account belong to the same guild. Players may leave their guild whenever they please, but only the leader and officers can dismiss non-officer players from the guild; the leader has the additional power to dismiss officers and disband the guild. Guilds have a membership limit of 100 members; player communities with more than that many members generally create allied sister guilds, often named similarly and using the same tag and cape.

Up to ten individual guilds may ally together to form an alliance. Members of an alliance may communicate over a shared chat channel, and visit the guild halls of the other guilds of the alliance. Each alliance has a leader guild that initiates the alliance, the leader of which is also the alliance leader, who may admit or dismiss guilds from the alliance. Each alliance must be devoted to either the Kurzicks or the Luxons, the two Canthan factions (from Guild Wars Factions) locked in perpetual conflict. Players can accumulate faction (reputation) with either the Kurzicks or the Luxons, which can either be "donated" to the alliance or redeemed for certain in-game rewards. The alliances with the highest total amount of donated faction are given control of certain in-game outposts on the Canthan continent; controlling an outpost gives the alliance members access to restricted areas of the outposts, containing, among other things, merchants who sell at a discount.

In addition to membership in guilds, a player may be a guest of any number of other guilds. Guest privileges are limited to visiting the guild hall and participating in guild or alliance battles. An accepted invitation expires after 24 hours.

== Story ==
=== Ascalon ===
Player characters begin the game in the fictional idyllic kingdom of Ascalon, which serves as the tutorial content for new characters. The setting is friendly, with few aggressive monsters and a number of easily completed quests. New characters are introduced to the main protagonists of the multi-campaign Guild Wars story: the monk Mhenlo, the warrior Devona, the elementalist Cynn and the ranger Aidan. Player characters also interact with Prince Rurik (voiced by Robin Atkin Downes), the heir apparent of the kingdom. After completing a number of initial quests and selecting a secondary profession, the character is then inducted into the Ascalon Vanguard, an elite force led by the prince himself who are fighting the armies of the Charr beasts who are planning an invasion of Ascalon. During the final quest in this tutorial world, the Charr complete a ritual to unleash a rain of fire and stone upon the world, breaching Ascalon's defensive Great Wall, and reducing most of its cities to ruins. This in-game event, referred to as the Searing, transports the characters into a post-apocalyptic world of constant strife, with no way of returning to the pre-Searing areas. The mechanic employed in the Searing is often cited by ArenaNet as a primary benefit of the instanced design of Guild Wars, which allows world-changing and time-advancing stories to be told individually to player characters instead of requiring the game-world to be static and timeless.

In the post-Searing world, the initial portion of the non-tutorial plot sees the protagonists and player characters try to recover their footing against the Charr in the ruined kingdom of Ascalon. In a climactic event, Prince Rurik realizes the battle is lost, and beseeches the king to give the kingdom up and escape alive to the neighboring human kingdom of Kryta. The stalwart King Adelbern—his father—sees no merit in Rurik's plea, and banishes the prince for daring to suggest abandoning his country. A few refugees, including the protagonists and player characters, follow the now-exiled Rurik to Kryta; during the trip, Rurik is trapped and slain by the Stone Summit dwarves, a xenophobic faction who seek to control the passes through the Shiverpeak Mountains and are waging civil-war against the other human-allied Deldrimor Dwarves.

=== Kryta ===
The protagonists arrive in Kryta leaderless and attempt to set up a refugee settlement. Soon, they become involved in the war brimming between the White Mantle who govern Kryta and an army of undead, led by an Undead Lich, who are laying waste to the Krytan countryside. During a sequence of missions, the players help the Mantle hold back the undead, for which they are rewarded by being allowed to participate in a Choosing ceremony. During the ceremony, it is revealed that the Mantle are actually murderers who worship obscure beings and use the souls of the slain Chosen villagers to power arcane magical devices. The protagonists quickly decide to join a resistance organisation known as the Shining Blade and put an end to the Mantle. This plot twist also introduces the vizier Khilbron of the destroyed divine kingdom of Orr. However the White Mantle are more powerful than expected, and after some successes by the player they call upon their masters, a powerful race of beings known as the Mursaat, to destroy the Shining Blade and drive the players out of Kryta.

=== Flameseeker Prophecies ===
Prophecies introduced Vizier Khilbron, who helps the players escape to the Crystal Desert to partake in the ritual of Ascension. This is the first step to them fulfilling the Flameseeker Prophecies.

After ascension, the players have an audience with the ancient dragon Glint, the author of the Flameseeker Prophecy. She aids them in a sequence of missions against the Mantle and the Mursaat, leading eventually to the volcano where "the power to destroy Good and Evil" is kept sealed. At the urging of Khilbron, the players storm the Mursaat stronghold built around the volcano and release the seals on the door, releasing the Titans, an army of powerful beings of fire from beneath the earth. Khilbron then reveals himself as the evil Lich Lord who was leading the undead in Kryta and who has been manipulating the player since they arrived from Ascalon. He reveals that he is the Flameseeker in the prophecy, not the player, and takes command of the titans and orders them to attack all of Tyria. The players then defeat him in the final mission of the campaign, using his life force to seal the Titans back in their prison.

And so the prophecy is fully fulfilled. The Mursaat have been destroyed by the player and the Titans. The Lich's life energy is enough to keep the Titans imprisoned for millennia, removing the need to sacrifice Chosen to maintain the seal.

=== Sorrow's Furnace ===
Prophecies introduced, half a year after the campaign, the free Sorrow's Furnace expansion returned players to the Shiverpeak mountains, specifically to the caverns underneath it. There, they participate in a sequence of quests with the final goal of defeating the Iron Forgeman, an immense automaton used by the Stone Summit dwarves to drive their war effort. Sorrow's Furnace introduced "unique items" to Guild Wars: these are items of set stats dropped by bosses. This model was repeated and expanded in the following Factions, Nightfall and Eye of the North releases.

=== Gods' Realms ===
Prophecies introduced two high-end dungeons that have been present in every subsequent Guild Wars release: the Fissure of Woe and the Underworld. These areas are accessible by the avatars of the in-game gods (for a small game-currency fee).

== Development ==
Guild Wars is the first game created by developer ArenaNet. Senior developers from Blizzard Entertainment, some involved in the early development of World of Warcraft, left to create ArenaNet to develop a game which took risks with game design and business model. Guild Wars development was first announced in April 2003.

Guild Wars development began in an environment following the release of EverQuest when a number of new MMORPGs were announced. ArenaNet positioned Guild Wars in a niche in this landscape, offering unlimited gametime without subscription fees. ArenaNet believed that players would not pay subscription fees for every online game they play and that paying a fee would cause players to make a "lifestyle commitment" to a particular game, rather than the usual behaviour of playing many different games and switching between them. Jeff Strain, a founder of ArenaNet, said, "It is our opinion that the free online gaming model combined with frequent content updates is the optimum online paradigm for interfacing with consumers and creating a significant, enduring gaming franchise."

ArenaNet used open beta testing throughout the development of the Guild Wars series. For the first public appearance of Guild Wars in April 2004, that occurred in conjunction with E3 2004, people were encouraged to download the client and play an online demo of the game to test its networking capabilities. This was followed by a preview event and several beta test weekend events. In addition to the public beta events, ArenaNet used continuously running closed alpha test servers throughout development; some alpha testers were ArenaNet employees but most were volunteers from the player community who signed a non-disclosure agreement with ArenaNet.

To support their fee-free approach to online gaming the server architecture developed for the game was core to minimizing the bandwidth costs associated with maintaining game servers. Infrastructure design was influenced by the developers' experiences with Battle.net development. Each time there is an update to the game the existing client automatically downloads a new version which examines a manifest of files to determine which files have been modified and therefore need to be downloaded to the client machine. This manifest is prioritized so that core assets are downloaded prior to the player being able to start the game, and the rest can be downloaded in the background during gameplay. ArenaNet uses this rapid update technology to make changes on demand and close exploits in the system.

Sorrow's Furnace added further playable content in September 2005. In 2010, the Prophecies campaign received a major content addition in the form of the War in Kryta, the Tyrian component of the Guild Wars Beyond initiative. This new content was designed to help bridge the 250-year story gap between the end of first game and the start of Guild Wars 2. The game took five years to develop at a cost of $20 million to $30 million.

== Guild Wars Reforged ==
A rerelease of the game, titled Guild Wars Reforged, was released on December 3, 2025. It was developed in collaboration with 2weeks, a team made up of former ArenaNet staff with over 14 years’ experience working on the original game.

Guild Wars Reforged includes all content from Guild Wars Factions and Guild Wars Nightfall in one package (although the original expansion, Guild Wars: Eye of the North, remains a separate purchase). The release also featured a number of modern enhancements including upgraded visuals (such as dynamic sky bloom, improved lighting, and occlusion), positional audio, a redesigned user interface with high-DPI display support, larger text options, and a new quest-tracking system, as well as Steam Deck certification and modern controller support. The game will be released on mobile platforms on June 24, 2026

== Reception ==
=== Sales ===
Guild Wars debuted on The NPD Group's computer game sales charts at #1 for the month of April 2005. NPD ultimately ranked Guild Wars as the fourth-best-selling computer game of 2005. In the United States, it sold 540,000 copies and earned $26.1 million by August 2006. At the time, this led Edge to declare Guild Wars the country's 23rd-highest computer game seller released since January 2000. It also received a "Silver" sales award from the Entertainment and Leisure Software Publishers Association (ELSPA), indicating sales of at least 100,000 copies in the United Kingdom; and a "Gold" award from the Asociación Española de Distribuidores y Editores de Software de Entretenimiento, for more than 40,000 sales in Spain during its first 12 months.

By September 2005, Guild Wars had sold 1 million units. France accounted for 100,000 copies of this figure. As of August 2007; Prophecies and the two subsequent campaigns Guild Wars Factions and Guild Wars Nightfall have together sold more than 5 million copies. The game had sold 6.5 million copies by August 2010.

=== Critical reviews ===
Reception

Aggregate scores
Aggregator	Score
GameRankings	89.67%
Metacritic	89/100

Review score
Publication	Score
IGN	9/10

Guild Wars has been well received by critics, especially for its character designs. It received a score of 89.67% on GameRankings and 89/100 on Metacritic.

In 2005, it won several prestigious awards including IGN's Best PC RPG and GameSpy's MMORPG of the Year awards. The editors of Computer Games Magazine presented Guild Wars with their 2005 awards for "Best Technology" and "Best MMO Debut", and named it the year's fourth-best computer game. They wrote, "With almost every element of the design, ArenaNet carefully thumbs its nose at the model introduced by Ultima Online, codified by EverQuest, and perfected by World of WarCraft." It won PC Gamer US's "Best Massively Multiplayer Game 2005" and "Best Value 2005" awards, and was a finalist in the "Best Roleplaying Game 2005" category, which ultimately went to Dungeon Siege II. The magazine's Chuck Osborn wrote, "It's too early to say whether fee-less online gaming is the wave of the future, but Guild Wars is definitely a trendsetter." During the 9th Annual Interactive Achievement Awards, Guild Wars tied with City of Villains for "Massively Multiplayer Game of the Year".

Some contemporary published criticism of Prophecies was heavily informed by the then-dominant World of Warcraft MMORPG formula. For instance, IGN's Tom Mcnamara considered the number and placement of creatures encountered in the PvE world overwhelming, particularly since the party size and number of skills are both limited to eight. He further found combat repetitive, for "[a]s fun as combat is, and as pretty as it looks .... [mobs] don't give much (if any) experience points and will be dropping items that are virtually useless to you." GameSpot's Greg Kasavin, on the other hand, hailed Guild Wars its decision to limit active skills to eight as "a resounding success", noting that "[w]hich eight skills you bring to battle and which skills you discover during your adventure is really at the heart of what makes Guild Wars such a compelling experience." Similarly, Eurogamer's Kieron Gillen praised the flexibility of Guild Wars its profession and skill-swap systems for "turn[ing] the single-player game into something where you're experimenting, thinking and re-evaluating constantly (since it's easy to rejig your abilities)." Tyler Nagata from GamesRadar+ agreed, finding Guild Wars to provide "lots of incentive to experiment with various character builds until you find the one that fits your play style best" and "never let[ting] you feel that you’ve been trapped in a certain character build".

Second, both players and published reviews have commented on the unnatural coupling of cooperative and competitive matches, which require very different playing styles. At the game's release, PvP focused players were required to "unlock" their skills and items by playing through the cooperative game, even though a PvP player may have no interest in cooperative gaming. This issue, however, has been addressed by ArenaNet, firstly by introducing Balthazar Faction in June 2005 which enabled unlocking through playing PvP and further in August 2006 by making skill unlocks for the individual professions of the Prophecies campaign available in the game's online store.
