= The Mark of Kri =

2002 video game

- Developer: San Diego Studio
- Publisher: Sony Computer Entertainment
- Director: Jeff Merghart
- Producer: Tim Neveu
- Programmers: Richard Karpp; Haesuk Pak
- Artist: Jeff Remmer
- Composer: Jack Wall
- Platform: PlayStation 2
- Release: NA: July 30, 2002; EU: March 14, 2003; AU: March 30, 2003
- Genre: Action-adventure
- Mode: Single-player

The Mark of Kri is a 2002 action-adventure game developed by San Diego Studio and published by Sony Computer Entertainment for the PlayStation 2. It is the first game developed with the San Diego Studio name, which was formed through a merger between Red Zone Interactive and 989 Sports. The game was followed by Rise of the Kasai in 2005, which was developed by BottleRocket Entertainment, where the original team had relocated.

== Background ==
With an art team consisting mostly of former 2D animators, The Mark of Kri offered a juxtaposition of cartoonish character designs and graphic violence while employing a unique visual style influenced by various Polynesian cultures and art, as well as a plot set in a Polynesian-influenced fantasy world incorporating elements of Maori mythology.

The game also featured elements of adaptive music, with techniques developed specifically for it, providing "incredibly tight synchronization [with] on-screen state changes."

== Plot ==
The story begins with Rau Utu, a great and noble warrior of a new generation of protectors known as the Rakus, trained to safeguard the bearers of the Marks of Kri by his mentor, adopted father, and the last of the older generation of Rakus, Baumusu.

Accompanied during his adventure by a raven, Kuzo, who serves as his scout, spirit guide, chronicler, and narrator, Rau was trained in stealth and exceptional swordsmanship. He was also taught to be a hero who helps those in need rather than act as a mercenary. Rau is initially asked for a favor by the village innkeeper, Rongo, and an elderly cleric, Maoruku, from the north of Tapuroku. They report that bandits are disrupting local trade and request Rau's assistance. After Rau deals with the bandits, news of his prowess and heroics spreads far and wide.

This leads to a mysterious man appearing at the tavern, offering Rau payment for his services. Despite feeling uneasy about the man and Baumusu's suspicions regarding the necromancer, Rau accepts the offer. He travels to the forest of Heiadoko, where he retrieves a piece of parchment from the tomb of Sambu-usu. This parchment, however, is actually one of the Marks of Kri—human skin. Rau returns home only to realize he has been manipulated by the mysterious man, known as the "Dark One," later revealed to be a necromancer and Ganguun Priest devoted to the Kasai, an evil organization seeking world domination and attempting to subvert Rau's true destiny.

An elderly fortune teller named Simka informs Rau that the money he received from the Dark One is counterfeit and cursed by the Kasai. She instructs him to travel north to a place called Vaitaku, find a tree, and eat its fruit, revealing the tree as an oracle. After consuming the sacred fruit, Rau learns both about the Mark of Kri and his destiny to protect a captured boy who possesses the fifth mark, which the Dark One will soon claim. The oracle also reveals that Rau has a great destiny: his name will be whispered to children on stormy nights, songs will be sung and written in his honor, and the sixth and final mark is well protected.

Rau then travels to the heavily guarded temple of Meifiti to save the boy from being sacrificed. However, the boy has already been killed by the Dark One, leading Rau into a trap designed by the necromancer. Upon returning to the inn, Rau discovers that his village has been attacked and destroyed. Baumusu, witnessing the carnage, tells Rau of his path in life: he must find his sister, Tati, who possesses the final Mark of Kri and was taken during the village attack, before dying as a noble warrior and Rakus.

Driven by vengeance for Baumusu's death and the destruction of his village, Rau travels to Rahtutusai and confronts the Dark One. After defeating the necromancer's horde of zombies and Kasai troops, the Dark One attempts to recruit Rau to his quest for world domination. Rau refuses and kills the Dark One by throwing an axe at his head, avenging Baumusu, the innkeeper, and the village, and succeeds in rescuing Tati.

However, according to Kuzo, Rau and Tati still have more work ahead. They vow to confront an old enemy long forgotten and save the Three Kingdoms from Kasai domination. "But all of this is a different story, for another time," Kuzo says before flying away.

== Gameplay ==
The game makes use of the DualShock 2's analog sticks. The left is used for movement and the right for locking on to surrounding enemies.

== Development ==
The game was developed by San Diego Studio, using team members from the former development team of Twisted Metal III and Twisted Metal 4. The game development was led by Jay Beard, who was also producer on the Twisted Metal series.

== Reception ==
Reception

Aggregate score
| Aggregator | Score |
|---|---|
| Metacritic | 80/100 |

Review scores
| Publication | Score |
|---|---|
| AllGame | 3.5/5 |
| Edge | 7/10 |
| Electronic Gaming Monthly | 8.5/10 |
| Eurogamer | 7/10 |
| Famitsu | 32/40 |
| Game Informer | 9/10 |
| GamePro | 4.5/5 |
| GameRevolution | B+ |
| GameSpot | 7.5/10 |
| GameSpy | 3.5/5 |
| GameZone | 8.9/10 |
| IGN | 8.8/10 |
| Official U.S. PlayStation Magazine | 3/5 |
| The Cincinnati Enquirer | 3.5/5 |
| Entertainment Weekly | A |

The Mark of Kri received favorable reviews according to the review aggregation website Metacritic. The game was given a score of 8.5 out of 10 and was awarded Game of the Month in the August 2002 issue of Electronic Gaming Monthly. In Japan, where the game was ported and published by Capcom on October 23, 2003, Famitsu gave it a score of 32 out of 40.

Entertainment Weekly gave the game an A and called it "the most surprising, and visionary, action-adventure game of the summer." Maxim awarded it a score of 8 out of 10 and stated that "As an engrossing adventure, Kri doesn't cut very deep, but where quick, visceral payoffs are concerned, it goes straight for the jugular." However, The Cincinnati Enquirer gave it three-and-a-half stars out of five, stating the game was "a little on the short side (about 10 hours to complete or so) but does prove to be a fun fantasy romp for those who prefer action, stealth and attractive visuals."

The Mark of Kri was nominated for the outstanding achievement in "Character or Story Development" and "Animation" awards at the AIAS' 6th Annual Interactive Achievement Awards, which ultimately went to Eternal Darkness: Sanity's Requiem and Sly Cooper and the Thievius Raccoonus, respectively. It was also a runner-up for the "Outstanding Animation in a Game Engine," "Outstanding Art Direction in a Game Engine," and "Outstanding Costume Design" awards by the National Academy of Video Game Trade Reviewers, which went to Sly Cooper and the Thievius Raccoonus, Metroid Prime, and Kingdom Hearts, respectively.

The Mark of Kri sparked some controversy in New Zealand, where some regarded Sony as having made culturally insensitive use of elements of Māori culture in the game's design.
