= Flesh Feast (video game) =

1998 video game

- Developer: Ingames
- Publisher: SegaSoft
- Composer: Peter Connelly
- Platform: Windows
- Release: NA: May 20, 1998
- Genre: Action
- Modes: Single player, multiplayer

Flesh Feast is a 3D action horror game released on May 20, 1998 by SegaSoft. Flesh Feast was designed primarily for multiplayer gameplay on SegaSoft's Heat.net network.

== Plot ==
The game's plot concerns a secret ingredient invented by the food company Nutrition Applied Science and Technology Inc. (NASAT), which has been released and has infected Nasat Island's water supply. The citizens are dying and rising as flesh-hungry zombies, buried dead, break through the ground to attack the living. The player proceeds through fourteen levels controlling three teams of characters, each team consisting of one main character and two sub-characters.

== Gameplay ==
Flesh Feast is a third-person action game with the in-game camera showing a top-down perspective in most instances. Throughout the game, hordes of zombies attack the player and must be repelled with weapons which are found throughout levels. A radar display shows the location of items relative to the characters. The objective is to unlock the final showdown at NASAT headquarters by completing each of the game's levels, containing the disaster.

Each level is split into three sectors representing difficulty levels, with one of the player's teams of characters assigned to each. Completing sectors in order is not required. Levels take place over several locales such as a dock, a graveyard and a shopping mall. Characters are controlled directly or indirectly; players can manoeuvre their characters via the keyboard or click the mouse on enemies or items to command their teams to attack or collect items. Completing each sector involves locating the exit; typically this also entails obtaining keycards and other items to remove barriers.

Multiplayer games can be played via a local area network and online via the heat.net service. Both cooperative and competitive game modes are available for two to eight players.

== Reception ==
Reception

Aggregate score
Aggregator	Score
GameRankings	48%

Review scores
Publication	Score
CNET Gamecenter	4/10
GameRevolution	C
GameSpot	4.9/10
IGN	5/10
Next Generation	3/5
PC Accelerator	6/10 (TOT) 1/10
PC Gamer (US)	32%

The game received unfavorable reviews according to the review aggregation website GameRankings. GamePro called it "an overblown puzzler trying to cash in on the trend, and it's a terribly frustrating one at that." (Note: GamePro gave the game 3.5/5 for graphics, 4/5 for sound, 1/5 for control, and 2/5 for overall fun factor.) Next Generation, however, said, "even though much of Flesh Feast's appeal comes from the bloodshed – imparted from 30 plus weapons ranging from human limbs to uzis – it's the puzzle-solving that keeps it interesting."
