= Plane Crazy (video game) =

1998 video game

- Developer: Inner Workings
- Publishers: NA: SegaSoft; EU: Europress
- Platform: Microsoft Windows
- Release: EU: April 1998; NA: 30 September 1998; Remaster: 13 October 2025
- Genre: Racing
- Modes: Single-player, multiplayer

Plane Crazy is a 1998 racing video game developed by Inner Workings for Microsoft Windows. The player control pilots race planes through 3D courses. Plane Crazy was based around arcade racers rather than flight simulation, focusing on action rather than realism. It was originally planned for release in arcades as one of the first games to use Microsoft and Intel's Windows-based arcade system. The game supported the Heat.net multiplayer gaming system, with up to eight players allowed in one race. A PlayStation version was planned but cancelled.

== Gameplay ==
The starting line of the level "Border Dash".

Plane Crazy had three game modes for PC:

- "Quick Race" - Allowed you to play a single level against eight AI opponents.
- "Ghost Race" - Time trial mode.
- "Championship" - Expanded below.

Plane Crazy had four game modes for PS1:

- "Championship"
- "Extreme Championship"
- "Single Race"
- "Best Times"

In Plane Crazy the player pilots a fast, cartoon-like plane, built for speed across a variety of levels. The objective of each level is to reach the end as fast as possible. Planes either bounce or explode when they come into contact with other structures, terrain, or even other planes. They then respawn, invincible for a short amount of time.

There are three types of planes: the light and fast plane that cannot take much damage, the evenly balanced plane and the heavy plane which is slower but can take more punishment. Each of these planes can be upgraded and customized.

Throughout each map there are blue vortexes dotted at given locations, that give a random upgrade/weapons to the plane. These power-ups give players an advantage over the other opponents, making game play more hectic. "Black Cat" grants invincibility for a short amount of time. "Rocket Boosts" increases the planes speed dramatically for a few seconds, depending on the rocket's level (small, large, large*3). Sometimes a player may be given a weapon which could fire a random homing missile at a random opponent in front of the plane. That player will than be sent an "Incoming!" message where the player can try to dodge the projectile. If the missile should hit, that player's plane could be temporarily disabled or plummet to the ground. Each plane is also given three blue torpedoes, which can be used to trigger environmental hazards for other players or open short-cuts.

Plane Crazy featured online play, using the Heat.net multiplayer gaming system, it allowed eight players on one server at one time.

=== Championship Mode ===
Against seven other opponents, the objective of each level is to make it to the finish before the other players do. Throughout the course there are checkpoints that give you additional time. If the player should run out of time their engine would cut out leading their plane to veer and descend. If the plane were to touch anything they would crash leading to a game over. The only way to avoid this is to reach a checkpoint before hitting an obstacle. Upon completing a level the player will be rewarded with a cash pay out for upgrading their plane, the cash reward is increased the further into the championship with the highest value being $1000.

Sometimes a bonus reward may be available, giving the player an extra cash pay out; the highest bonus pay out is $1000.

When the last race is complete the player may be given a trophy based on their position.

=== Level Design ===
All maps in Plane Crazy are linear in design and would feature shortcuts that were either already exposed or could be exposed by player interaction by using rockets, of which each player would start with 3 per map. Rockets could also be used to activate hazards that would allow the player to catch up with players ahead of them, if used effectively.

Players could also pick up blue orbs that are scattered around the course, the "Power-up Generators" would give players power-ups ranging from boosts and player-targeted rockets to stealth.

==== Levels ====
Border Dash - a canyon map that features short sections over water and in a town.

Dockland Dive - a map that takes place in an industrial area with sections flying through a cooling tower, through sewers and over water.

Monument Rush - a canyon map that features a couple of water sections and caves.

Volcano Rapids - a map that takes place high up in a volcano with sections flying through a jungle, over lava and water, in ancient ruins and, notably, through a waterfall.

Sin City Run - a map that takes place entirely in a neon lit city at night.

Drain Stormin (PS1 Exclusive) - a map that takes place in a series of storm drains.

==== Power-ups ====
Nitro - A short burst of speed.

MiniNitro - A weaker but more sustained speed boost.

Triple Nitro - Three Nitros.

Static Attack - Sends the plane that is hit into a spin, making the target lose control.

Xtreme Slow - Temporarily slows the target down, making the target lose altitude.

Stealth - Provides immunity to power-up attacks and immunity from taking damage from environment collisions.

Stall - Temporarily stalls the target, making the target lose altitude - if they hit something the target will explode.

Wobbly Joystick - "Steering of the plane is temporarily taken over by cockpit gremlins", adds small extra inputs to the target player, making the plane harder to control.

== Reception ==
Reception

Aggregate score
Aggregator	Score
GameRankings	62%

Review scores
Publication	Score
Computer Games Strategy Plus	2/5
Computer Gaming World	2.5/5
Edge	5/10
Game Informer	7.75/10
GamePro	4/5 (Note: GamePro gave the game three 4/5 scores for graphics, control, and overall fun factor, and 5/5 for sound.)
GameRevolution	B
GameSpot	5.5/10
Hyper	86%
IGN	8.5/10
Next Generation	2/5
PlayStation Official Magazine – UK	(PS) 4/10
PC Gamer (US)	35%

The PC version received mixed reviews according to the review aggregation website GameRankings, reviews generally commented on the high difficulty of the game and how good it looked, for the time period. IGN said, "Just reaching the end of the initial courses takes numerous attempts, and players with a low threshold for failure will likely give up on the game before it even begins to reveal how good it really is.". Next Generation said, "Every now and then, a game comes along that promises to be something grand, but in reality, it stinks more than a huge pile of pig... well, you get the idea. Plane Crazy is one of those games.".

== Championship Edition ==
Plane Crazy was remastered and re-released in October 2025. The remaster includes new game mode called "Rookie Arena", which introduces three variants of a new lap-based map.

== See also ==
- SkyDrift
