= 10Six =

2000 video game

- Developer: SegaSoft
- Publisher: SegaSoft
- Platform: Windows
- Release: February 28, 2000
- Genre: MMORTS
- Mode: Multiplayer

10Six is a massively multiplayer online real-time strategy video game developed and published by SegaSoft, and released in 2000 for Windows.

== Gameplay ==
The player takes on the role of a new recruit from one of these companies who must participate in the colonization. To do this, they use new technologies called Jitters, which allow them to create buildings, vehicles, or items. Each faction has a variety of specific vehicles and weapons.

== Plot ==
The game is set in a science-fiction future where an asteroid, containing a new energy source called Transium, has entered the Solar System. Four companies – ToyCo, Extreme, BruteForce, and Infrastruct – have colonized the asteroid and are competing for control of this new resource.

== Development ==
SegaSoft planned to create a series of online strategy games allowing players to buy, sell, and trade virtual objects over the Internet as early as June 1997.

10SIX was originally being developed by Post Linear Entertainment Inc. (PLEI). But SegaSoft brought the development in-house. The game's servers were shut down by Sega on 31 May 2002.

A strategy guide was released for the game by BradyGames. A Dreamcast version was announced but never released.

== Reception ==
Reception

Review scores
Publication	Score
All Game Guide	2/5
Computer Games Magazine	4/5
Computer Gaming World	1.5/5
IGN	6.2/10
Joystick	30%
PC Zone	59%
The Electric Playground	6.5/10

Computer Games Magazine said "The very least that can be said of 10-Six is that, so long as Heat.net continues to offer a free trial week of play, checking the game out is worth the several hours it takes to download. That is more than enough time to build a good base camp, make some allies, explore Visitor, and decide for yourself whether you want to subscribe".
