= Guild Wars Factions =

2006 video game

- Developer: ArenaNet
- Publisher: NCSOFT
- Series: Guild Wars
- Platform: Windows
- Release: April 28, 2006 (Retail): NA: April 22, 2009 (Steam)
- Genres: Action RPG; CORPG
- Mode: Multiplayer

Guild Wars Factions is a fantasy action role-playing game and the second stand-alone campaign in the Guild Wars series developed by ArenaNet, a subsidiary of NCSOFT corporation. It serves as both a standalone game and first expansion pack to the base game, which is referred to as Prophecies. Simply referred to as Factions, it introduces the continent of Cantha, inspired by East Asian cultures, where two warring factions, the Luxons and the Kurzicks, are locked in a global persistent war. Players are able to join in this conflict, assisting their chosen faction in claiming towns on the game map.

Factions introduced a new PvE campaign, two new professions in addition to the original six, new skills and armor for existing professions, new gameplay modes for both PvE and PvP, and gameplay modifications in response to criticism of the earlier Prophecies campaign. Most of the PvP content from Prophecies is available to Factions-only accounts.

A rerelease of the original game titled Guild Wars Reforged, which includes all content from Guild Wars Factions and Guild Wars Nightfall was released on December 3, 2025. The game will be released on mobile platforms on June 24th, 2026.

== Gameplay ==
Factions is a standalone version of Guild Wars that shares the same gameplay mechanics and features a unique area and storyline.

=== Professions ===
A male assassin

A female ritualist

Like all Guild Wars campaigns, Factions contains the core character classes introduced in Prophecies; it also adds two new classes to the game:

- The Assassin is a master at getting in quickly, striking and getting back out just as quick. They are able to instantly teleport around the field of combat using their ability to Shadow Step. They are capable of dealing a great deal of damage to a particular target, especially spellcasters, in a very short amount of time. This is offset by their weak armor, making them relatively ineffective frontline fighters. They use self healing and can solo spike.
- The Ritualist is a living conduit to the spirit world, capable of summoning bound spirits to the field that can attack enemies or protect allies. They can also summon ghostly weapons for their allies to wield, and commune with the spirits of their ancestors through the ritual use of ashes and urns.

Dervishes and Paragons can get to Cantha via Kamadan, the port city of Istan, but they cannot be created in Cantha.

=== PvE modifications ===
Cooperative missions in Factions are different from their equivalent in Prophecies. In Prophecies, players complete a main mission and an optional bonus mission. Cooperative missions are easy to avoid in Prophecies as most areas are accessible without completing missions. Factions makes all missions compulsory for accessing new areas and completing the game. The bonus mission has been removed and replaced with a three-tiered reward system. Some missions' tiers are based on the time taken to complete the mission, others are based on completion of extra objectives (such as keeping a certain number of NPCs alive until the end). Gold, experience and a skill point are given at each reward tier. Several new concepts for co-operative missions have been introduced, such as missions with two teams of eight and missions specifically for killing a single boss.

The time taken for a new character to reach the maximum level of twenty is reduced and most of the areas are designed for level twenty characters. Experience, and therefore skill points, are easy to acquire once level twenty is reached. This means that the time taken to unlock skills through PvE play is reduced from Prophecies. Skill acquisition is modified also, most skills must be purchased from Skill Traders, rather than received by completing quests.

Boss enemies now do double damage and take half the time to use spells and skills instead of having shortened hex and condition durations.

=== Factions and alliances ===
Factions introduces two factions which players and guilds may side with;

- Kurzick - respecting art, religion, and social order, the gothic Kurzick dwell in the Echovald Forests. The Kurzicks wear dark clothing to capture as much sunlight and heat as possible in their dark environment. The Kurzick culture seems to be more European than Asian, but the hairstyles of some of the Kurzick males and females do somewhat reflect East Asian style.
- Luxon - respecting strength above all else, the Jade Sea dwelling Luxon are often compared to pirates, and are somewhat religion-less. They tend to wear light clothing to reflect the heat from the sun.

Neither faction is considered to be inherently 'good' or 'evil'.

Factions also introduces the concept of multi-guild Alliances. An alliance is a group of up to ten guilds aligned with the same faction who agree to join in an alliance under the name of a single lead guild.

Each faction has a number of towns which they own; the control of these towns is given to alliances with the highest standing with their faction. Alliances may earn this faction by means of donations from that alliance's member players.

A player may earn account-based Kurzick or Luxon faction points while they are playing Factions. Faction points are earned doing PvE quests for a faction, competing in Alliance battles, in Competitive Missions or in some Challenge Missions. If the player does not wish to donate faction to the alliance, or if they play for the faction which the guild isn't allied with, they can trade their faction points for armor crafting materials or skills that can be used in the PvE portion of the game. A player is considered Luxon or Kurzick by having a majority of unspent faction points for the faction they support. To change faction a player needs to acquire a majority of factions points for their new faction.

=== Competitive missions ===
Factions provides PvE players access to two competitive missions, a new game type for the Factions campaign. In these missions, two random teams of eight compete to reach specific objectives. If a player dies they respawn in the base and are able to rejoin the fight to meet the objectives. When the match finishes the players are returned to a waiting area to start the next battle.

- The Jade Quarry is a point capture mission. The common goal for both factions is to capture the jade quarries so that jade can be dug from them. Each jade shipment that successfully made its way back to the Faction's base is worth one point. In addition, there are several Watchtowers to be captured, giving strategic advantage to the owner when attacking the jade shipments.
- In the Fort Aspenwood mission the Luxons must storm a Kurzick base and kill an NPC known as Master Architect Gunther, a Kurzick engineer, to stop him from making a new weapon for the Kurzicks. Additionally, the Luxons must intercept amber shipments to slow down the development of the Kurzick weapon and base repairs by the Kurzick team. The base must be defended by the Kurzicks long enough for the engineer to complete the weapon.

=== Challenge missions ===
These missions are a new gameplay type introduced in Factions. They set specific scoring objectives for a team to meet, offering rewards of gold, experience or faction points dependent on the team's performance in the mission. The best teams over each quarter, each month and each day are recorded for players to view online. There are five different missions each with different objectives. For example, Dragon's Throat requires the players to kill as many enemies as possible over a period of time and Amatz Basin (named by ArenaNet after the player community of The Amazon Basin, which also contributed to the official Guild Wars strategy guide) requires the players to save as many NPC refugees as possible in a set time.

=== Alliance battles ===
Alliance Battles are where the Luxon and Kurzick factions battle for control of towns on the game map. Each faction is represented by a team of twelve, split into three squads of four. Players form squads of four which are randomly teamed with two other squads for the match.

The objective of the battle is to be the first team to reach 500 points. Points are rewarded for capturing and holding strategic map locations and player kills. If one team holds all map locations for a minute, the team automatically receives 500 points and the victory. Players do not get a penalty for dying (as they would in most other parts of the game) and are automatically resurrected. Players on both the winning and losing side are rewarded with Kurzick or Luxon faction according to the number of points their side gathered, with bonus points being given to the winning side.

The battles are fought on a series of five maps which are weighted from strong advantage to the Luxons, through neutral to strong advantage to the Kurzick. The map played on depends on the land held by the faction. For example, if the Luxon are holding a lot of land, the maps played on give advantage to the Kurzick. Teams that are playing on maps where the opposition has an advantage receive a bonus to the number of Alliance faction points accrued during the match.

== Plot ==
The Factions story is only loosely connected to that of the earlier Prophecies campaign. The primary link is with the monk Mhenlo, who is revealed to have spent his youth in the Factions-specific fictional continent of Cantha. Players who add Factions to their account can bring their role-playing characters from other campaigns by accompanying Mhenlo; characters that begin in Factions meet Mhenlo later in the plot.

Like Prophecies, Factions begins with a tutorial section, called the Shing Jea Island, with easy quests and non-threatening monsters. The Factions tutorial areas are not separated from the rest of the game like in Prophecies, but are instead accessible at all times like any other outpost. In the tutorial, Canthan characters are introduced to one of the main characters of the Factions story, the ritualist Master Togo. Togo is a half-brother to the emperor of Cantha, and the head of the Shing Jea Monastery where new Factions characters receive their preliminary training. It is revealed that Togo was a former mentor of Mhenlo. The Factions tutorial quests are directed towards specific tactical and strategic gameplay features such as kiting, snaring, and countering melee fighters.

The initial tutorial missions also introduce new players to a plague spreading over Cantha. In attempting to find its source, the players discover the mark of an ancient evil from Cantha's history, the disgraced imperial bodyguard Shiro Tagachi. Two hundred years before the events of the story, Shiro murdered the emperor he was sworn to protect, and was himself promptly slain for his evil act. Shiro's death wail triggered a calamitous event, the Jade Wind, that swept across the continent of Cantha, turning the sea into solid jade and the Echovald Forest in southern Cantha to stone. (This back story was featured in a full-motion cinematic trailer for Factions.) Togo recognizes the mark of Shiro and rushes to inform the emperor; the player characters, under his direction, head to the seat of the Canthan empire, the sprawling Kaineng Center.

In the mainland, Factions characters are united with characters from other campaigns when they join forces to eject Shiro's army of the afflicted from Vizunah Square. At the end, they learn more about the history of Shiro. When he was slain for his murder, he became an envoy of Grenth, the god of death, and was given the task of shepherding the newly dead to the underworld. However, Shiro was not content with this fate, and wished to become mortal again, which he hoped to accomplish by slaying the emperor to complete an arcane ritual. To accomplish this, Shiro uses his envoy powers to spread the affliction, and uses the souls of the dead as soldiers in his army. The other envoys are not happy with Shiro's actions and decide to help the players to put an end to him.

The first step in the envoys' plan is for the players to become closer to the stars to gain the ability to hurt Shiro in his envoy form. Subsequently, they pay a visit to the spirit of the former assassin Vizu, who was instrumental in defeating Shiro previously. From Vizu, the players learn of the artifacts of two other Canthan heroes responsible for Shiro's death: the urn carrying the ashes of Saint Viktor, the patron saint of the Kurzicks, and the spear of Archemorus, the legendary hero of the Luxons. The players retrieve the artifacts, and assault Shiro at the center of his power, in the Sunjiang District, destroying his constructs and closing spirit rifts he has opened. Shiro himself, however, escapes. At the advice of the envoys, the players then choose a side; going with Mhenlo to convince the Kurzicks that Shiro returning is more important than their ongoing war with the Luxons, or with Master Togo to convince the Luxons to stop fighting the Kurzicks. This causes a momentary fork in the story; the earlier Prophecies campaign was criticized for its linearity, so both Factions and the subsequent Nightfall campaigns have included non-linear elements in the plot. Once the players convince their chosen side, players from the Luxon and Kurzick factions meet again to seek advice from the ancient dragon, Kuunavang. They find that Kuunavang has been corrupted by Shiro, but they defeat Shiro's corruption and Kuunavang aids the players subsequently in their fight against Shiro by granting them devastatingly powerful skills.

Meanwhile, Shiro has raided the palace and has kidnapped the Emperor. The players rush to save the emperor by cutting a path through Shiro's army of fearsome Shiro'ken constructs. Just as Shiro is about to slay the Emperor, Master Togo throws himself in the way, saving the Emperor. He pays a steep price, as Shiro focuses instead on Togo for his ritual; it appears that he merely needs to spill royal blood, not necessarily the emperor's. Togo's death is a sharp blow, but it makes the battle against Shiro immensely personal for Mhenlo, who vows to avenge his former master. In the final battle, the players assault the now-mortal Shiro Tagachi and kill him for a second time, after which his mortal form is sealed in jade and his spirit is captured by the other envoys. Unlike the final mission in the earlier Prophecies campaign, this final mission consists solely of the battle against Shiro, allowing players to modify their tactics, skills and team setup before a climactic final battle; this innovation was also used against the end bosses of the subsequent Nightfall and Eye of the North releases.

== Development and release ==
Factions was developed by ArenaNet as a standalone release over twelve months immediately following the release of Guild Wars in 2005. Executive producer Jeff Strain described the aims of the new release were to improve on the campaign of the original game, offering improved graphics and new co-operative play mechanics through the introduction of alliances, factions and player-versus-player modes. The soundtrack of Factions was created by video game composer Jeremy Soule, who had composed the music for the original game. Factions was announced on 10 January 2006, with ArenaNet launching a free player-versus-player preview event on January 20–22 to introduce the Assassin and Ritualist professions. Between 24 and 26 March 2006, a two-day public beta preview event was launched for the game for European players who had pre-ordered Factions and up to three referred players, with over 500,000 players participating in the event over the weekend, making it one of the largest public beta events of its time. A 'Day of the Tengu' pre-release event was held for pre-order players on 27 April 2006. Factions was released on 28 April 2006. To coincide with the release, ArenaNet and NCsoft announced a Guild Wars Factions Championship event at the Leipzig Games Convention in August 2006.

== Reception ==
=== Sales ===
Upon release, Factions reached the top of the Chart-Track weekly sales for computer games in the United Kingdom, Europe, and North America. Shortly after the release of Factions, the number of sales of Guild Wars titles passed the two million mark milestone.

=== Reviews ===
Reception

Aggregate score
Aggregator	Score
Metacritic	84/100

Review scores
Publication	Score
The A.V. Club	B−
Eurogamer	8/10
GameSpot	8.5/10
GameSpy	4.5/5
GamesRadar+	4/5
IGN	8.5/10
PC Gamer (US)	80%
PC Zone	78%
RPGamer	4/5
VideoGamer.com	7/10

According to review aggregator website Metacritic, Factions received "generally favorable" reviews from critics.

Reviewers were impressed by the addition of the new Kurzick and Luxon factions that players could ally with and claim territory on the game map for their alliance, but criticized its weak storyline (compared to Prophecies), poorer voice-acting, and its accelerated character level curve that let characters reach the maximum level before leaving the tutorial content. The continuing problem of the Guild Wars user interface lacking advanced team-forming and trading functions was also criticized, but the subsequent Nightfall release partially addressed these criticisms by adding a unified party-search utility with limited trading functions. Justin Olivetti of Engadget critiqued the game's soundtrack, stating the music was "technically sufficient" but lacked the "grandeur" and "catchiness" of its predecessor.

=== Accolades ===
Factions was nominated for a British Academy Video Games Award in the 'Multiplayer' category, and won the Best Multiplayer Game award from DEMMX.
