= SegaSoft =

Video game developer

- Type: Joint venture
- Industry: Video games
- Founded: 1995; 31 years ago
- Founder: Sega Enterprises; CSK Corporation
- Defunct: 2000
- Fate: Dissolved
- Headquarters: Redwood City, California, U.S.
- Area served: Worldwide
- Key people: Bernie Stolar; Isao Okawa; Jerry Markota
- Products: Video game publishing
- Services: Content delivery
- Owner: Sega Enterprises (50%); CSK Corporation (50%)

SegaSoft was a joint venture by Sega and CSK (Sega's majority stockholder at the time), created in 1995 to develop and publish games for the PC and Sega Saturn, primarily in the North American market. SegaSoft was originally headquartered in Redwood City, California and later San Francisco.

SegaSoft was responsible for, among other things, the Heat.net multiplayer game system and publishing the last few titles made by Rocket Science Games.

== History ==
In 1996, SegaSoft announced that they would be publishing games for all viable platforms, not just Saturn and PC. This, however, never came to fruition, as in January 1997 SegaSoft restructured to focus on the PC and online gaming.

SegaSoft disbanded in 2000 with staff layoffs. Many of them were reassigned to Sega.com, a new company established to handle Sega's online presence in the United States.

== Published games ==
Some games published by SegaSoft include:

- 10Six
- Alien Race
- Bug Too!
- Cosmopolitan Virtual Makeover
- Cosmopolitan Virtual Makeover 2
- Da Bomb
- Emperor of the Fading Suns
- Essence Virtual Makeover
- Fatal Abyss
- Flesh Feast
- Golf: The Ultimate Collection
- Lose Your Marbles
- Grossology
- Mr. Bones
- Net Fighter
- Obsidian
- Plane Crazy
- Puzzle Castle
- Rocket Jockey
- Science Fiction: The Ultimate Collection
- Scud: The Disposable Assassin
- Scud: Industrial Evolution
- The Space Bar
- Three Dirty Dwarves
- Trampoline-Fractured Fairy Tales: A Frog Prince
- Vigilance

== Cancelled games ==
- G.I. Ant
- Heat Warz
- Ragged Earth
- Sacred Pools
- Skies
- Sonic X-Treme (Was pitched after the Sega Saturn port was cancelled but was rejected due to SegaSoft not making new games for PC but rather only ports)

== Heat.net ==
Unreal Tournament's game page and a private chat window

Heat.net, stylized HEAT.NET, was an online PC gaming system produced by SegaSoft and launched in 1997 during Bernie Stolar's tenure as SEGA of America president. Heat.net hosted both Sega-published first- and second-party games, as well as popular third-party games of the era, such as Quake II and Baldur's Gate. Much like Kali, it also allowed users to play any IPX network-compatible game, regardless of whether or not it was designed for the Internet. Each supported game had its own chat lobby and game creation options. In addition, players could add friends and chat privately with them. Heat.net and its sister service, SEGANet, are considered ahead of their time and precursors to both Xbox Live and PlayStation Network.

Heat.net essentially combined the network, client, and protocol technologies of the MPlayer system (obtained under license) with the IPX tunneling package Kahn. However, the client software eliminated the Voxware voice features, as SegaSoft's engineers found that most bugs in the MPlayer software were in the voice module. Heat.net branded itself as a peaceful alternative to real-world violence with advertising slogans such as "Total peace through cyberviolence" and "Kill pixels not people."

It featured a currency system where the player earned "degrees" through playing games, trivia contests (both game-related and general), viewing ads, or other actions. Degrees could be spent, but only by premium members, at Heat.net's online store, the Black Market, which had computer games and related merchandise. On May 6, 1999, SEGA announced it had partnered with Chips & Bits' online game superstore which allowed players a vast selection of games, hardware and even magazine subscriptions.

The degree system was highly flawed and non-active players could leave their PCs logged into servers and earn degrees. Rooms were established for idle players to sit and earn degrees. Heat.net established "parking police" to discover these servers but players discovered other ways to falsely earn points.

Other features included tracking of user rankings on individual profile pages. Heat.net had a loyalty program, in which members, known as "Foot Soldiers", received shirts and Heat.net dog tags.

Heat.net was also the home of a collegiate gaming league called HeatCIGL (College Internet Game League). Students from 1,100 registered schools would play Quake III: Arena or Unreal Tournament in teams representing their colleges, with play-offs at the end of the season. The championship team received $5,000. The league also gave away a $5,000 "Excellence in Gaming" College Scholarship.

In September 2000, it was announced that Heat.net and HeatCIGL would be shutting down on October 31, 2000.

In June 2008, CNET hailed Heat.net as one of the greatest defunct websites in history.

=== Some games supported on Heat.Net ===
- Sega-published titles
  - 10SIX
  - Fatal Abyss
  - Flesh Feast
  - Flying Heroes
  - Net Fighter
  - Plane Crazy
  - Scud: Industrial Evolution
  - Vigilance
- Third-party titles
  - Age of Empires
  - Age of Empires II
  - Age of Wonders
  - Army Men
  - Army Men II
  - Baldur's Gate
  - Battlezone
  - Blood
  - Blood II: The Chosen
  - Command & Conquer: Red Alert
  - Commandos: Behind Enemy Lines
  - Commandos: Beyond the Call of Duty
  - Darkstone
  - DeathDrome
  - Descent
  - Diablo
  - Duke Nukem 3D
  - Get Medieval
  - Grand Theft Auto
  - Grand Theft Auto II
  - Heroes of Might and Magic III
  - Hexen II
  - Kingpin: Life of Crime
  - MechWarrior 2: 31st Century Combat
  - NAM
  - Postal
  - Quake
  - Quake II
  - Quake III: Arena
  - Railroad Tycoon II
  - Redneck Rampage
  - Redline
  - Requiem: Avenging Angel
  - Sin
  - Star Trek: Starfleet Academy
  - Take No Prisoners
  - Total Annihilation
  - Total Annihilation: Kingdoms
  - Unreal Tournament
  - Uprising: Join or Die
  - Uprising 2: Lead and Destroy
  - Warbreeds
  - Warcraft II: Tides of Darkness
  - Warlords III: Reign of Heroes
  - WWII GI
