= BottleRocket Entertainment =

American video game developer

- Industry: Video games
- Number of employees: 24 (2004)

BottleRocket Entertainment was an American third-party video game developer founded by Jay Beard (previously head of San Diego Studio), composed primarily of former San Diego Studio employees and animators. Many of them worked on The Mark of Kri (2002) before the studio was formed.

The company's first work was a sequel of The Mark of Kri at Sony Computer Entertainment America, called Rise of the Kasai. The game received mixed to positive reviews. The company's next title was an adaptation of the animated series Xiaolin Showdown, as a video game, released in 2006 by Konami.

BottleRocket Entertainment was developing Splatterhouse (2010), a beat 'em up title in the Splatterhouse franchise by Bandai Namco, but was removed from the project after an unspecified "performance issue" caused a split. Several former BottleRocket employees accepted new positions within Namco Bandai continuing their work on the title.

BottleRocket Entertainment was reported to be developing a licensed title for Brash Entertainment, which was cancelled when Brash went out of business in November 2008. A source in Kotaku revealed the game to be DC Comics character The Flash. Footage of the canceled title was posted on YouTube by Greg Miller, a designer and former employee at BottleRocket Entertainment, in 2014.

Eventually, Jay Beard announced in an email to Kotaku that, "after fighting to keep the doors open for the past six months we have decided to close and move on." The company was officially closed on September 3, 2009, and Beard is reported to be "building a new development studio from the ground up." Beard currently works as an art director for Amazon Game Studios.

== List of BottleRocket Entertainment games ==
- Rise of the Kasai (2005)
- Xiaolin Showdown (2006)
