= Lineage =

Lineage may refer to:

== Science ==
- Lineage (anthropology), a group that can demonstrate its common descent from an apical ancestor or a direct line of descent from an ancestor
- Lineage (evolution), a temporal sequence of individuals, populations or species which represents a continuous line of descent
- Lineage (genetic)
- Lineage markers
- Data lineage

== Gaming ==
- Lineage (series), a medieval fantasy massively multiplayer online role-playing game franchise
  - Lineage (video game), the original 1998 game
  - Lineage II, a 2003 prequel to Lineage
  - Lineage III, an upcoming sequel to Lineage II
  - Lineage W, 3D mobile version of Lineage aiming for global service
- Assassin's Creed: Lineage, a series of short films based on the Assassin's Creed II video game

== Television ==
- "Lineage" (Angel), a 2003 episode of the television series Angel
- "Lineage" (Smallville), a 2002 episode of television series Smallville
- "Lineage" (Star Trek: Voyager), a 2001 episode of the television series Star Trek: Voyager
- "Lineage", a 2012 episode of the television series Revenge (season 2)

== Music ==
- Lineage, a 1990 album by Benny Green
- Lineage (Shigeto album), 2012
- Lineage, a 2017 EP by Versailles

== Other fields ==
- Embraer Lineage, business jet
- Lineage (Buddhism), line of transmission of Buddhist teachers
- Lineage (company), an American cold storage real estate investment trust
- Zen lineage charts, lines of transmission of Zen teachers
- Line of transmission of martial arts teachers and/or founders
- LineageOS, an open-source operating system
