= Jinmyeonghwang's Executioner Sword =

Item in Lineage games

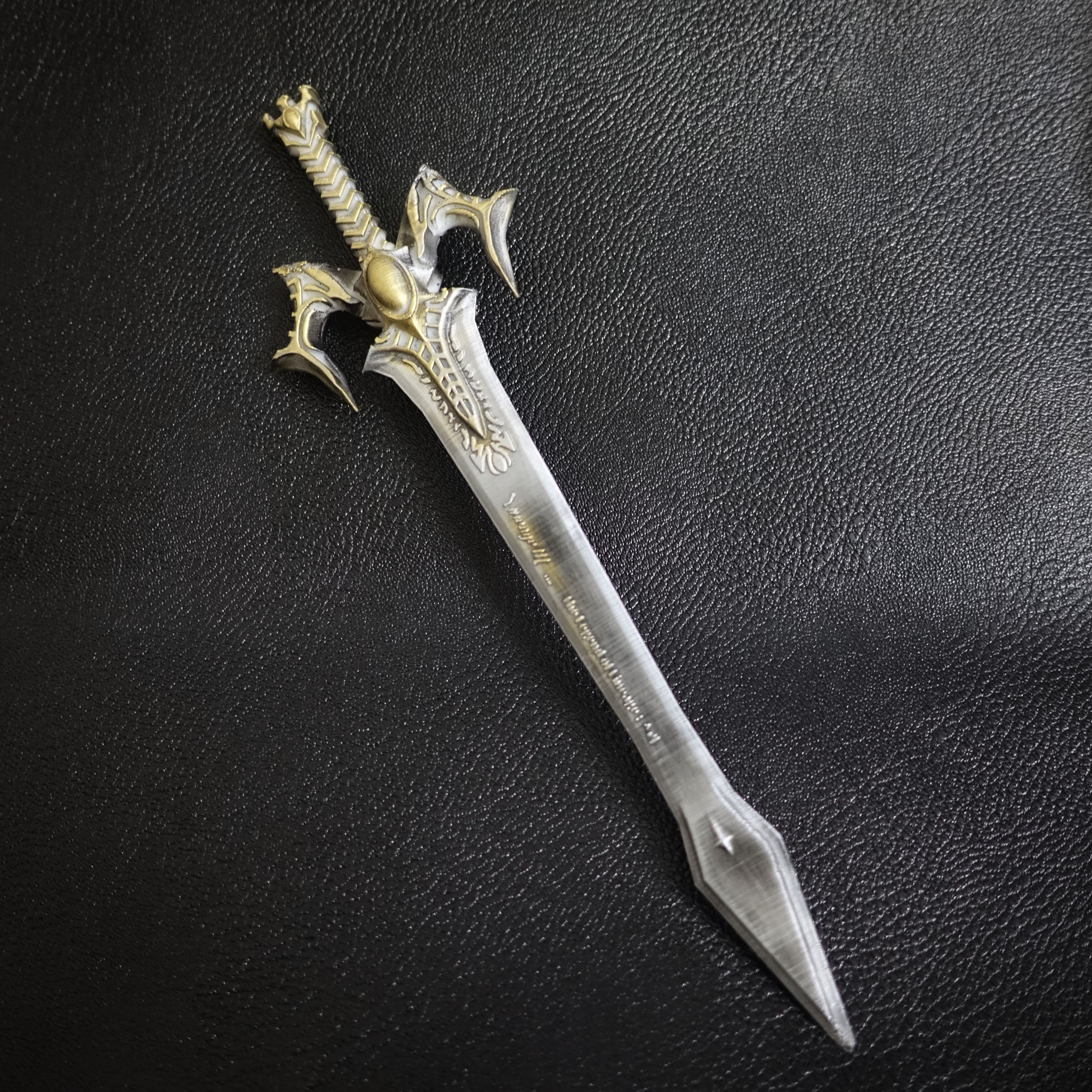
A miniature model replicating the Jinmyeonghwang's Executioner Sword on a smaller scale. In NCSoft's Lineage game series, Jinmyeonghwang's Executioner Sword was considered the strongest weapon and recorded a cash value of hundreds of millions of KRW.

Jinmyeonghwang's Executioner Sword, abbreviated as the Executioner's Sword, is a two-handed sword item that appears in the online game Lineage 2 and the mobile game Lineage M, serviced by the South Korean game company NCSoft. Added to Lineage 2 in March 2007, the Executioner's Sword is set in the game lore as belonging to 'True Emperor Dantes', the leader of the Dark Elf race. Due to the buffs for the two-handed sword weapon class and the item's high baseline stats, Jinmyeonghwang's Executioner Sword became the strongest weapon in Lineage and the symbol of the game; however, it was extremely rare due to a demanding crafting method that required a production period of 6 months to 1 year alone.

Due to the difficulty of crafting and the risk that, unlike other items, it could be destroyed even upon the very first 'enchant', the value of the Executioner's Sword exceeded 35 million KRW in cash for an unenchanted one, and fetched up to 125 million KRW when enhanced four times. In 2011, an item trading website even offered Jinmyeonghwang's Executioner Sword along with 100 don (approx. 375 grams) of gold as the first-place event prize. As the item's value continued to skyrocket, it was also referred to as Jippangeom (a Korean joke meaning that the price was so high one would have to sell their house to obtain it). Even after that, each time the highest enchant record for the Executioner's Sword was broken, it drew media attention; however, since 2015, due to a decline in the game's player base and the resulting increase in market supply, the value of the Executioner's Sword gradually declined.

Disputes occasionally arose both inside and outside the game surrounding the expensive Executioner's Sword. An online streamer exploited an in-game system to destroy an Executioner's Sword owned by an opposing clan member. Meanwhile, in 2011, a user sued the game company after NCSoft rejected their request to punish scammers who had stolen their Executioner's Sword and to restore the item. In 2013, a woman in her 60s filed a lawsuit requesting the restoration of an Executioner's Sword that vanished due to a failed enchant, citing concepts such as 'mistake' under civil law, but lost the case.

In celebration of the NC Dinos' victory in the 2020 Korean Series, the players performed a ceremony lifting a trophy shaped like the Executioner's Sword, which had been prepared in advance by the club. The Executioner's Sword trophy was crafted to be 155 cm in size and light enough in weight to be lifted with one hand. The ceremony proceeded with Kim Taek-jin , the CEO of NCSoft, personally stepping onto the mound to unveil the Executioner's Sword, and Yang Eui-ji, the team captain and a Lineage player, lifting it up. The Executioner's Sword ceremony received positive reviews from various media outlets.

== In Game ==
Jinmyeonghwang's Executioner Sword was added to the Shydlashu server alongside the Rastaubad Dungeon in March 2007, timed with the update of 'Inevitable Destiny', the final episode of Lineage's 'Season 2: Crossed Hatred'. 'True Emperor Dantes', who appeared here, was the leader of the Dark Elf race in the game lore and the ruler of the Rastaubad Dungeon, commanding eight elder 'High Judges' and four Dark Kings. Together with the Anti-King Ken Rauhel, he had also destroyed the prosperous Gludio Village. However, Dantes fell into a plot by one of the Dark Kings and died along with the majority of his clan while summoning 'Girtas', a god of another world. At the point where players play the game, he is reduced to a mere NPC capable only of dialogue, with only his physical body barely remaining deep inside the dungeon. The sword placed beside him, intended for the execution of the treacherous Dark Kings, and harboring the grudges of Dantes and the Dark Elf race who died along with the summoning of Girtas, is precisely 'Jinmyeonghwang's Executioner Sword'.

At the time of its first appearance in 2007, Jinmyeonghwang's Executioner Sword and other weapons of the two-handed sword class, which precluded the use of shields, were not welcomed by players. However, their performance improved through patches in 2008, such as an increase in two-handed sword attack speed, the addition of the two-handed sword-exclusive skill 'Shock Stun', and the addition of 'Counter Barrier', a two-handed sword skill for the Knight class that reflects enemy attacks. With base stats offering more than three times the attack power of conventional melee weapons, it surpassed the existing 'Katana' and 'Rapier' to earn the title of the strongest item, and furthermore, became the symbol of the Lineage series.

However, Jinmyeonghwang's Executioner Sword was extremely rare due to a demanding crafting method. To craft the Executioner's Sword, materials such as 1,000,000 Adena (the currency of Lineage), 10 Oriharukon Plates, 10 Mithril Plates, 10 Silver Plates, 10 Gold Plates, 10 Platinum Plates, 100 Black Mithril, 1 Rastaubad Weapon Crafting Secret Book, 1 Knight's Two-Handed Sword, 500 Ore of Darkness, and 10 Tears of Gran Kain were required. While all of these were items that could be obtained through hunting monsters, the drop rates were random, so collecting them took a long time. It was nearly impossible for an individual player to collect them all, and even for a massive clan, it required a period of about 6 months to 1 year to gather everything. In particular, the eight types of 'Rastaubad History Books', which were the core materials, could only be obtained one type at a time in a 'sealed' state by defeating the eight elder 'High Judges' of True Emperor Dantes. They could not be sold while sealed, and attempting to unseal them for crafting the Executioner's Sword carried a certain probability that the history book would vanish, further increasing the crafting difficulty. In fact, the Executioner's Sword made its very first appearance only eight months after it was added to the game. As of 2010, the owners of Jinmyeonghwang's Executioner Sword numbered only around 40 across the entire Lineage player base.

In March 2017, at the end of a promotional video for the sequel mobile game Lineage M, Jinmyeonghwang's Executioner Sword appeared in a trade window between players. On May 16 of the same year, during the Lineage M media showcase held at The Raum in Yeoksam-dong, Gangnam, Seoul, NCSoft's Managing Director LeeSung-gu mentioned that Jinmyeonghwang's Executioner Sword would be awarded to the top clan through siege warfare. The crafting materials for the Executioner's Sword in Lineage M differed from the main Lineage series, requiring a 'Mythic Crafting Secret Book' and four types of 'Dragon's Breath'. In Lineage M, the Executioner's Sword maintained its legendary status by possessing stats superior to even a +24 'Greatsword of Crimson Force'. On March 12, 2019, a player named 'K-Tank' from the Depardieu 02 server of Lineage M crafted the Executioner's Sword for the first time across all servers. To commemorate this, NCSoft distributed 300 items called 'Einhasad's Blessing' to all players.

In addition, in 'Aden', a mobile game released by Its Games in 2016 that sparked a controversy over infringing upon Lineage's IP, an item named 'Myeonghwang's Executioner Sword' appeared, which is just one character short of the original item's name.

== Value ==
In Lineage 2, an MMORPG, powerful new items were released with every major update, causing market prices to fluctuate rapidly. Items that were rare or enhanced through 'enchanting' commanded even higher prices. For instance, an item enhanced nine times traded for over 1 million KRW in cash during the early 2000s, and an item named the '+9 Saulsaby Greatsword' was valued at over 4 million KRW. However, 'Jinmyeonghwang's Executioner Sword' was an exception due to its demanding crafting method and its vulnerability to destruction even on the very first enhancement attempt, unlike other itemsMost weapons in Lineage could be safely enhanced up to +6 (+4 for armor) without any risk of destruction, a feature known as 'safe enchant.' However, Jinmyeonghwang's Executioner Sword had a safe enchant limit of 0, meaning it carried a risk of being destroyed upon the very first enhancement attempt. (Note: The Jinmyeonghwang's Executioner's Sword could be destroyed even on the first attempt due to the unique characteristics of its material, 'Black Mythril.' According to players' rules of thumb, general weapon enhancements are considered safe up to the fifth attempt.) Even an Executioner's Sword with an enchant count of zero traded in the 18 million KRW range in 2008, and reached the 35 million KRW range in 2015. A '+4 Executioner's Sword', enhanced four times, was valued at 120 million KRW in 2013. In 2011, an item-trading website even offered Jinmyeonghwang's Executioner Sword as a first-place event prize, alongside 100 don of gold and a Kia K5 mid-size sedan. As the price skyrocketed day by day, the Executioner's Sword earned the nickname 'Jippangeom' (House-selling Sword), meaning a 'sword you can only buy by selling your house.'

Every time a new enchant record for the Executioner's Sword was set, it was reported in the media. On August 9, 2015, when a player named 'ID Arcadia' from the Jud server posted a verified screenshot of a '+5 Jinmyeonghwang's Executioner Sword', it quickly became a news article. Although rumors suggested that the price of the '+5 Executioner's Sword' would exceed 500 million KRW, it was reported that the actual transaction fell through due to a price tag that was excessively high compared to its actual in-game performance. In 2017, an Executioner's Sword that successfully reached an +8 enchant emerged. Three years later, on May 14, 2020, a player named 'Drungmola' from the Depardieu server completed a '+9 Executioner's Sword'. To commemorate this, NCSoft erected special buff statues across all servers and presented Drungmola with a physical replica of the Executioner's Sword crafted from pure gold and diamonds.

The value of the Executioner's Sword declined after the Rastaubad Dungeon was removed following the 'Forgotten Island' update in 2015. To monopolize the crafting materials for the Executioner's Sword, certain clans had 'controlled' the Rastaubad Dungeon to block ordinary players from entering. In response, NCSoft implemented measures in 2011, such as preventing hunting ground control behaviors, applying a time-limit system, and designating specific days for entry. However, this only heightened the crafting difficulty of the Executioner's Sword, and as disputes among players persisted, NCSoft completely deleted the dungeon in 2015. With this patch, the boss monsters known as 'High Judges' vanished as well, making it impossible to acquire the 'Sealed History Books' required to craft the sword. Subsequently, the crafting materials could no longer be obtained through normal in-game activities, appearing only in NCSoft's random loot boxes. Coupled with a declining player base, a massive influx of items entered the market from players quitting due to the company's excessive proliferation of cash items, causing the price of the Executioner's Sword to drop below 30 million KRW in March 2017. To prevent further depreciation, NCSoft reopened the dungeon under the name 'Ruins of Rastaubad' in 2017, reduced the number of core materials from eight to four, and buffed the weapon's stats; however, following the launch of Lineage M, its price point fell below 20 million KRW. After the Lineage Remastered patch, new weapons with superior performance, 'Einhasad's Flash' and 'Gran Kain's Judgment', were introduced, stripping the Executioner's Sword of its title as the strongest weapon. 'Gran Kain's Judgment', which requires a '+10 Executioner's Sword' as its primary material, was crafted for the first time on October 12, 2020.

== Disputes with Players ==
n October 2011, Lineage streamer BJ 'Inbeom' exploited an in-game system penalty where a player who kills another in a PK (Player Kill) match loses their items upon their own subsequent death, ultimately destroying the Executioner's Sword owned by 'Baekryong Sarang', a member of a hostile clan. After intentionally allowing himself to be killed in a PK match against Baekryong Sarang, Inbeom used 'Mass Teleport' as Baekryong Sarang was returning to his hideout to forcibly teleport him to a location where Inbeom's allies were waiting, who then focused their fire to kill him. Consequently, due to the PK penalty, Baekryong Sarang lost his Jinmyeonghwang's Executioner Sword, and Inbeom's actions became widely remembered as the "worst PK." Journalist Yo-han Jang of the gaming webzine Inven(korean webzine) reported that some players expressed outrage over the lack of punishment for the perpetrator and the absence of system improvements.

=== Lawsuits for the Restoration of the Executioner's Sword ===
In 2011, a Lineage player attended an in-game gathering and, provoked by another player who teased them as a "beggar," dropped their Jinmyeonghwang's Executioner Sword on the ground while chatting, "Am I still a beggar?" At that exact moment, an accomplice disguised as a wild boar picked up the Executioner's Sword from the ground and fled, leading the victim to request the game company to punish the scammers and restore the item. While NCSoft permanently suspended the perpetrators' accounts, they refused to restore the item, citing an operating policy that losses resulting from "the customer's own negligence" are not compensated. In response, the user filed a lawsuit seeking damages. Additionally, the user sued the wild boar group on charges of embezzlement of lost property, but the claim was rejected on the grounds that in-game items do not constitute tangible property.

Meanwhile, on May 30, 2013, a woman in her 60s filed a lawsuit against NCSoft requesting the restoration of her Jinmyeonghwang's Executioner Sword, which had vanished due to a failed enchantment attempt. This player, who had achieved an in-game level of 70 within just seven months starting from April 2012, cited a provision in the Civil Act stating that "if there is a mistake in any essential element of a juristic act, the declaration of intention may be rescinded." Based on this, she argued that the Executioner's Sword had been destroyed due to a "mistake" that occurred while she was intending to enchant a different item. The Seoul Central District Court, which presided over the trial, ruled against the plaintiff. The written judgment, which naturally contained numerous gaming terms due to the nature of the case, stated that it was difficult to regard the enchantment of the Executioner's Sword as an act committed by mistake, citing the following reasons.

1.Weapons and armor require different magical scrolls for enhancement, but the plaintiff had purchased a weapon enhancement scroll prior to enhancing the Executioner's Sword.

2.The plaintiff unsealed the 'seal' on the Executioner's Sword—which can only be lifted through self-authentication—resealed it, and then unsealed it once more before attempting the enhancement.

3.While keeping the Executioner's Sword sealed, the plaintiff attempted to enhance other pieces of armor. Immediately after a failed attempt to enhance a Guarder of Health, the plaintiff purchased a weapon enhancement scroll to enhance the weapon. Furthermore, even after seeing the Jinmyeonghwang's Executioner Sword vanish due to the failed enhancement, the plaintiff proceeded to attempt another enhancement on a Roomtis' Blue Earring.

4.Although the plaintiff argued that the Executioner's Sword was too valuable and offered too little relative gain upon success to justify risking its destruction, it cannot be said that there was no incentive for value appreciation, given that other players on the same server had also attempted to enhance their own Executioner's Swords.

5.The plaintiff had reached level 70 and had already successfully enhanced a Jinmyeonghwang's Executioner Sword once in the past.

6.The plaintiff claimed that the defendant company (NCSoft) caused the mistake by failing to give notice regarding the risk of item destruction upon a failed enhancement. However, the plaintiff was already well aware of this risk from numerous prior enhancement attempts. Furthermore, since the enhancement process requires completing a sequence of specific steps—such as unsealing the item and purchasing the magical scroll—it is difficult to conclude that the mistake was caused by a lack of notification from the defendant.

== Executioner Sword Trophy ==
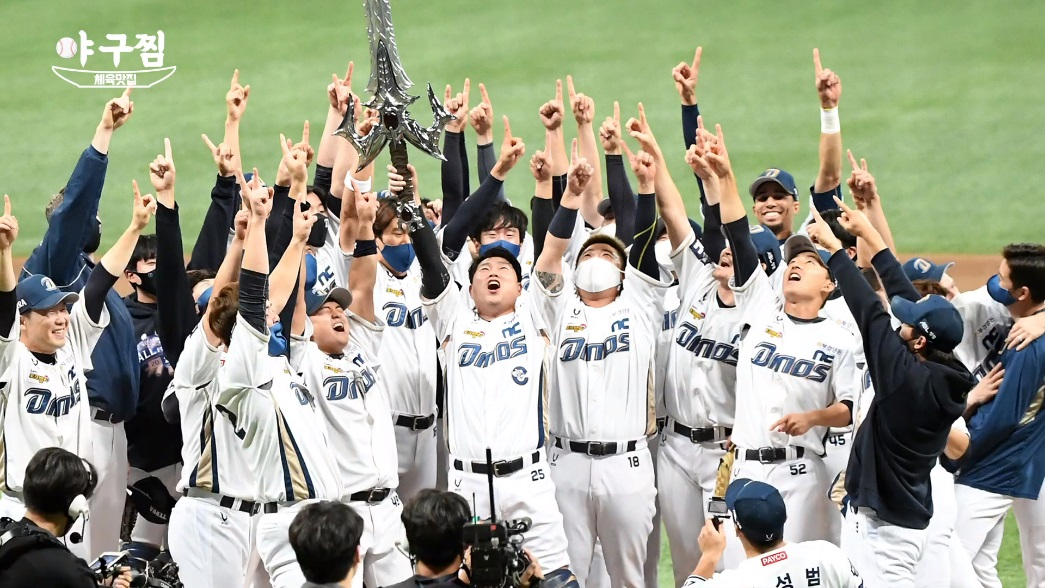
NC Dinos players performing the Executioner's Sword ceremony

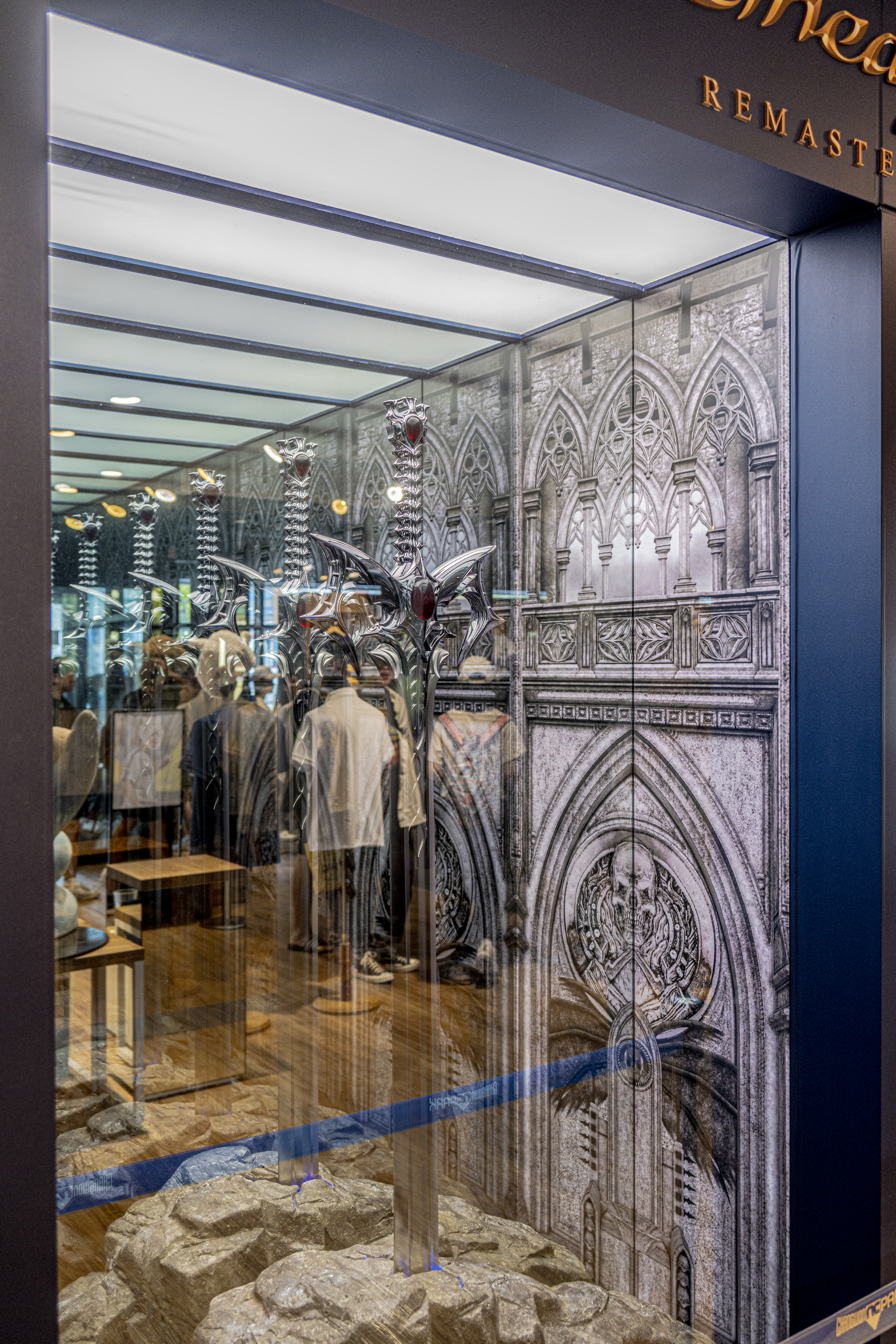
The actual Executioner's Sword trophy on display at Changwon NC Park

Ahead of the 2020 Korean Series, the NC Dinos professional baseball team discussed ideas for their championship ceremony. During the discussion, second baseman Park Min-woo suggested using a sword that appears in a game developed by their parent company, NCSoft. This idea was accepted, and a 155 cm trophy shaped like the Executioner's Sword was created. On November 26, after the game, Park Min-woo stated that he had liked the 'cannon ceremony' a home run celebration by the Kiwoom Heroes where players pose as if firing a cannon. of the Kiwoom Heroes, which led him to brainstorm a similar ceremony that could uniquely represent NC, ultimately bringing the Executioner's Sword to mind. However, he later added that he had never actually played the game himself and only saw what the physical Executioner's Sword looked like on the day of their championship victory. In an interview with the Hankook Ilbo on November 27, he expressed confidence, saying, "I knew it would become legendary from the moment I pitched the idea." He explained that he chose Jinmyeonghwang's Executioner Sword as a prop to create a "performance that would stay in fans' memories for a long time, while expressing NC and being something only NC could pull off." He also added that after discussing with the front office whether to use it for the championship ceremony or display it in the dugout during the series games, they decided to unveil it at the championship ceremony due to the time required for production.

The production process was carried out in absolute secrecy to prevent any leaks that might affect the players' performance, and the Executioner's Sword trophy was kept in a separate location before being brought onto the mound. Capitalizing on this secrecy, NCSoft built a story telling around the Executioner's Sword through game advertisements prior to the championship ceremony. Throughout the Korean Series, NCSoft broadcast a Lineage 2M commercial featuring blacksmiths forging a sword alongside the chant "Ttai." The individuals dressed up as blacksmiths in the video were actually CEO Kim Taek-jin and the Lineage 2M development team. None of the viewers who watched the commercial figured out the true identity of the sword. This storytelling advertisement reached its conclusion after the NC Dinos won the championship, when CEO Kim Taek-jin stepped onto the mound, lifted the black cloth covering the trophy, and unveiled the "handcrafted" Executioner's Sword. Among the players, the only ones who knew about the plan to unveil the Executioner's Sword beforehand were Park Min-woo, who conceived the idea, and Yang Eui-ji, the team captain. In fact, catcher Kim Tae-gun stated that he thought it was just a regular trophy when it was brought to the mound covered in cloth, and that all the players were completely shocked when the sword finally revealed itself.

For safety reasons, the Executioner's Sword trophy was crafted with blunt edges, and its size and weight were adjusted so that players could lift it with one hand. The overall concept of the Executioner's Sword ceremony drew inspiration from The Three Musketeers. While the sword-shaped trophy symbolized the three swords of the Musketeers, the ceremony—where the entire team gathered in a circle to lift it—was said to utilize the famous line from the work, "All for One, One for All." The trophy was drawn from its pedestal by Yang Eui-ji, the Korean Series MVP and a Lineage player himself. In fact, during a post-championship interview with KBS, Yang Eui-ji answered, "I think a +10 Executioner's Sword is a bit more expensive than the championship bonus. If I had to choose, I would pick the +10 Executioner's Sword."

This Executioner's Sword ceremony received positive reviews from current and former NC Dinos players, as well as various media outlets. Aaron Altherr, who played as a batter for the team, praised it, saying, "I thought our sword ceremony was really cool and impressive. I don't know who came up with that idea, but I think that person deserves a raise." Former NC Dinos players Eric Thames and Xavier Scruggs also responded by posting photos of the Executioner's Sword ceremony on their respective Instagram accounts. Matt Monagan of MLB.com commented on the championship ceremony, saying, "It looks as if they defeated a final boss in a video game and received an emerald sword," while also explaining that the sword originated from NCSoft's Lineage. Shanna McCarriston of CBS Sports introduced the Executioner's Sword trophy as a "gigantic sword" and shared her thoughts, writing, "Check out this incredible celebration." Kim Hak-soo, the editor-in-chief of Mania Times, commented that through the ceremony, the NC Dinos were able to demonstrate their intention of having "sharpened their swords" (prepared meticulously) for victory for a long time. The Athletic posted a video of the ceremony on Twitter, introducing it with, "The best trophy in sports? We didn't spend enough time talking about how the KBO league's championship trophy is literally a sword." Journalist Yoon Seung-jae of Sports Hankook gave a favorable review, stating, "Perhaps it was a symbolic ceremony that dealt a blow to those who scoffed nine years ago, saying 'a game company cannot run a baseball team'." Journalist Jeon Hyun-soo of Economic Review(Korean newspaper) argued that the fact that the Executioner's Sword trophy idea came from the players themselves is proof that the NC Dinos players feel a sense of loyalty toward the NCSoft brand. Ahn Jae-min, a researcher at NH Investment & Securities, analyzed in a stock market report, "Due to the Executioner's Sword lifted during the ceremony, NCSoft's brand awareness will increase and its philosophy on investment will be highlighted, which is expected to have a positive impact on corporate value." Cho Kwang-min of the Dong-A Ilbo praised the marketing strategy set up by NCSoft for the ceremony, commenting that by creating a dramatic scene through meticulous preparation, the Executioner's Sword was reborn from an expensive item known only to Lineage users into a symbol of victory.

Following their victory in the 2020 season, the physical Executioner's Sword trophy was transported to Changwon NC Park, the home stadium of the NC Dinos, where it remains on public display in a dedicated space within the ballpark.
