= Video games in South Korea =

In South Korea, video games are considered a major social activity, with most of the games being cooperative or competitive. Locally developed role-playing, first-person shooter, MMORPG, and mobile games have proven to be very popular in the country. Professional video game competitions (especially real-time strategy games) also enjoy a large following in South Korea; major tournaments are often broadcast on television and offer large prize pools.

South Korea has developed a strong economy in Asia through the development of creative industries such as online games. New York Times culture writer Seth Schiesel commented, "When it comes to gaming, Korea is the developed market. When you look at gaming around the world, Korea is the leader in many ways." Statistics provided by Korea Creative Content Agency show that the industry has had an average annual growth of 14.9% in sales since 2008.

South Korea has been known for its video gaming infrastructure and its place in esports scenes. Many professional video game players and coaches in the world were trained or originated from South Korea, and the country's pro leagues and tournaments across numerous video games are acclaimed by many to be the "most prestigious and competitive".

== History ==
=== 1980s–1990s ===
In January 1975, three units of the relabeled Pong machine Computer TV were installed in the Midopa Department Store in Seoul. The newspaper explained it as a "TV game" and said that big companies such as Samsung and Goldstar (now LG) were producing new machines, most of them Pong clones. Until the end of the 1970s, "electronic entertainment rooms" quickly spread around the country, despite fierce opposition by conservative parents, media and the regime. By 1980, only 43 arcade establishments were government-approved, while many hundreds were opened illegally. The Korean video game industry started as mostly an import market, getting machines from Japan and the USA. Since it didn't have any form of localization, the arcade manufacturers would put names in Hangul, making some name changes, such as "Donkey Kong" becoming "King Kong". Eventually, Korean companies started to develop their own arcade games. One of the first arcade games to be developed by a Korean company is Goindol, released in 1987 by SunA. It was also the first one to be released outside of Korea, with the company Sharp Image Electronics licensing it for North American distribution. Sharp Image licensed three other arcade games from SunA and Philko for release in North America, and also licensed Kaneko's Air Buster for release in North America. In 2001, a company called GameVision licensed six arcade games from Expotato, Andamiro, SemiCom, and Excellent Soft Design for release in North America. GameVision also developed a Game Boy Advance port of Tang Tang, which was released by Take-Two Interactive.

Home computers were a luxury import in Korea in the late 1970s and software programming was the domain of institutes like KIST. In 1983, domestic computers – which were clones of Japanese and American models – started being distributed as well as computer magazines. In March of the same year, companies like Samsung started to offer computers to schools to raise a computer-savvy generation. These same companies would host software competitions, but most of the programmers who won those competitions developing games preferred to use their knowledge for more serious software or jobs. In 1984, the computer models became more standardized, with almost all new models based on either the MSX or Apple II standard. This made it easier to import and copy foreign games, as there was no copyright law in Korea at the time for computer programs.

In December 1985, Daewoo released the Zemmix, an MSX-based video game console. It was the first domestic gaming hardware success, owing its sales to the huge number of imported and bootlegged games available. Because of that, domestic game development wasn't seen as necessary until July 1987, when a law protecting copyright ownership of computer programs was enacted. This led to the creation of small businesses with the intention of producing and publishing games. The country's first fully-fledged computer game was Sin'geom-ui Jeonseol, also known as Legend of the Sword, released for the Apple II computer platform in 1987. It was programmed by Nam In-Hwan and distributed by Aproman, being primarily influenced by the Ultima series.

Most of the stores that made unauthorized copies of games started to port them to Zemmix, the most representative publisher being Zemina, the first company to publish a domestic title, Brother Adventure, a Mario Bros. clone. However, the copyright law only covered the code itself, allowing the video game adaptation of foreign games. A group of Japanese companies (including Taito, Konami and Capcom) brought court cases against Haitai and Young Toys, but failed to win anything because the games in question were released before the enactment of the law. Most of the original Korean games were made by independent teams, such as "Mickey Soft's Kkoedori" and "New Age Team's Legendly Night". The Korean company Topia was one of the first to begin producing action role-playing games, one of which was Pungnyu Hyeopgaek, for MS-DOS, in 1989. It was the first Korean title published for an IBM PC compatible and set in ancient China.

Foreign companies like Sega and Nintendo had difficulty entering the market, so they licensed out their consoles to Korean companies. Samsung took Sega's Master System, which was then released in April 1989 as the "Samsung Gam*Boy". Most of the games were released in Korea in their original languages, with Phantasy Star the first game to be fully translated to Hangul. One year later, the Mega Drive arrived with the name of "Super Gam*Boy", having in 1992 all Samsung consoles renamed to "Aladdin Boy". Samsung also produced its own game, a shoot 'em up called "Uju Geobukseon". Hyundai was the responsible for the releasing the NES, named Comboy. However, it didn't have any translated games.

The development of those systems started slowly, as the necessary software was not as available as home computers. Most infringing companies found ways to simply convert MSX games to the Gam*Boy, due to their similar architecture. Two companies, Daou Infosys and Open Production, under the Jaem Jaem Club label, were responsible for a steady flow of domestic games for Gam*Boy consoles. Daou was known for its licensed game from the TV animation series Agi Gongnyong Dooly, which had a game released for the MSX. Open Production, on the other hand, was mainly responsible for original games, although most of them were platformers similar to other famous games, having completely original sprites, levels and gameplay. Three Open Production games were published in Australia, but only in 1995 when the Master System was already dead in Korea.

By 1990, the excitement for games developed in Korea declined. The lack of skill, budget, and manpower made it hard for the domestic developers to compete with imported games from Japan and the U.S. However, PC games started to rise. Until 1992, most of the games for PC were ports or adaptations of traditional board games or card games. When computers able to display colored graphics became more common, the industry started to produce games that could compete with consoles on the international market. Big companies started to invest in the development of games and Goldstar opened an educational institute for game developers on March 8, 1993. Localization of the games to the Korean language also became more frequent.

Two major Korean RPGs were released in 1994: Astonishia Story and an MS-DOS enhanced remake Ys II Special, developed by Mantra. The latter was a mash-up of Nihon Falcom's game Ys II (1988) with the anime Ys II: Castle in the Heavens (1992) along with a large amount of new content, including more secrets than any other version of Ys II. Both games were a success in Korea.

Commercial online gaming became very popular in South Korea from the mid-1990s. Nexus: The Kingdom of the Winds, designed by Jake Song, was commercially released in 1996 and eventually gained over one million subscribers. It was one of the earliest massively multiplayer online role-playing games. Song's next game, Lineage (1998), enjoyed even greater success amassing millions of subscribers in Korea and Taiwan.

During February 24 to 27, 1993, Computer Edutainment and Game Software Festival - the first video game expo in Korea - was held at the electronic store complex in Yongsan, Seoul. The first edition of the festival had high-profile exhibitors such as Hyundai, but on the following years, only small developers would continue to carry it on until its extinction in 1996. On the other hand, the Amuse World expo started as a small event and kept growing steadily, evolving to the nowadays G-Star, the largest game industry event in Korea.

=== Home console predominance ===
Around January 1993, home consoles in South Korea were estimated to be present in one of every four houses. However, they are not as popular as they used to be. The console downfall started with a photosensitive epileptic seizure mass hysteria successfully spread by the Korean mass media. Although the initial epileptic seizure was proven not to be related to flashing light sensitivity, the newspapers would report new or old cases, connecting them with video games. The media would blame Japanese video games, even stating that the cases happening in the US and Canada were also caused only by video games from Japan. Video game sales were damaged, and Samsung reported a decrease of 71.4% during 1993 and Hyundai, 33%. The industry started to slowly recuperate but was slowed down by the decision of the Ministry of Culture and Sports, on July 1, 1993, to revise the censorship regulation, so that video games on CD-ROM or cartridge have to pass an evaluation by the Korea Public Performance Ethics Committee. The rating system of the committee was considered one of the strictest in the world in the 1990s.

A May 1993 report in South Korean gaming magazine Game Champ estimated that approximately two million video game consoles were installed nationwide by March of that year. According to the magazine's estimates, Taiwanese-manufactured Famicom-compatible systems accounted for 76% of the installed base, while Sega's Aladdin Boy (Master System) and Super Aladdin Boy (Mega Drive) families represented 9.8% and 5.3%, respectively. The figures were compiled by the magazine from industry information rather than audited manufacturer sales data.

=== 2000–2009: Korean online gaming ===
On November 11, 2001, the sprite-based Ragnarok Online, produced by Korean company Gravity Corp, was released. Though unknown to many Western players, the game took Asia by storm as Lineage had done. The publisher has claimed in excess of 25 million subscribers of the game, although this number is based upon a number of registered users (rather than active subscribers). 2002 also saw the release of MapleStory, another sprite-based title, which was completely free-to-play - instead of charging a monthly fee, it generated revenue by selling in-game "enhancements". MapleStory would go on to become a major player in the new market for free-to-play MMORPGs (generating huge numbers of registered accounts across its many versions), if it did not introduce the market by itself.

In October 2003, Lineage II (NCsoft's sequel to Lineage) became the latest MMORPG to achieve huge success across Asia. It received the Presidential Award at the 2003 Korean Game awards and is now the second most popular MMORPG in the world. As of the first half of 2005 Lineage II counted over 2.25 million subscribers worldwide, with servers in Japan, China, North America, Taiwan, and Europe, once the popularity of the game had surged in the West. All the objectives that are included in Lineage II started to take shape following the work of designing the original mythology.

=== 2009–present: Transition to mobile platform ===
After the release of the iPhone, games like Angry Birds showed up on the market, showing off their success. Like that, in South Korea, the major game companies Com2uS and Gamevil started to release their new games, Home Run Battle 3D and ZENONIA, on the market in 2009.

In 2012, Kakao launched their new service called Kakao Games and they released their first game, Anipang, which was a huge success for both Kakao and its developer, SundayToz. After the launch of Kakao Games, major video game companies like Nexon, Netmarble, and many other minor game developers began to give their attention to the mobile platform.

In 2016, Netmarble released their new MMORPG game, Lineage 2 Revolution, by using Lineage's IP. The game grossed ₩206.5 million in one month, and it became a trend to make a mobile game based on a popular online game, such as Lineage, Black Desert Online, and Tera Online.

Recently in South Korea, gamers have been pessimistic about the video game industry in South Korea, saying the industry is in its Dark Ages. Many companies are still mostly making mobile games, and focusing more on advertising than actual gameplay.

== PC bangs ==
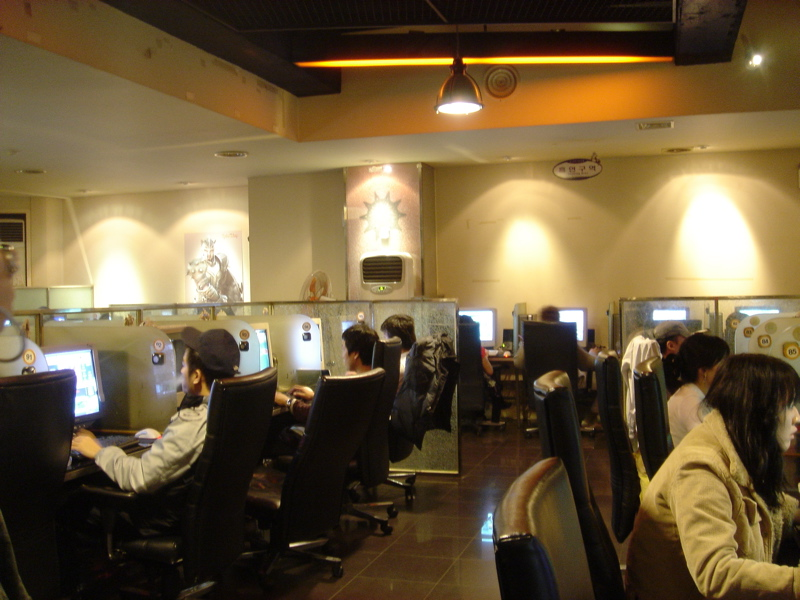
Korean PC bang

A PC bang (Korean: PC방; literally "PC room") is a type of LAN gaming center, where patrons can play multiplayer computer games and browse the internet for a small hourly fee. The typical cost for an hour of play ranges from 1,000 to 1,500 won (approximately $0.90 to $1.35 USD); however, as of 2013, 1,200 won per hour is the most common cost in PC bang. Although the per capita penetration of computers and broadband internet access is very high in South Korea, PC bangs remain popular as they provide a social meeting place for gamers (especially school-aged gamers) to play together with their friends. Furthermore, the computer hardware used by PC bangs may be more powerful than the systems available in the players' homes. Most PC bangs allow players to eat, drink and smoke (often with separate smoking and non-smoking sections) while they play. It is common for PC bangs to sell ramen noodles, canned coffee, soft drinks, and other snacks.

PC bangs rose to popularity following the release of the PC game StarCraft in 1998. Although PC bangs are used by all ages and genders, they are most popular with male gamers in their teens and twenties.

Many popular Korean multiplayer games provide players with incentives that encourage them to play from a PC bang. For example, the Nexon games Kart Rider and BnB reward players with bonus "Lucci"—the games' virtual currencies—when they log on from a PC bang and the popular League of Legends provides free access to all characters and extra game currency on each match.

== Professional and competitive gaming ==
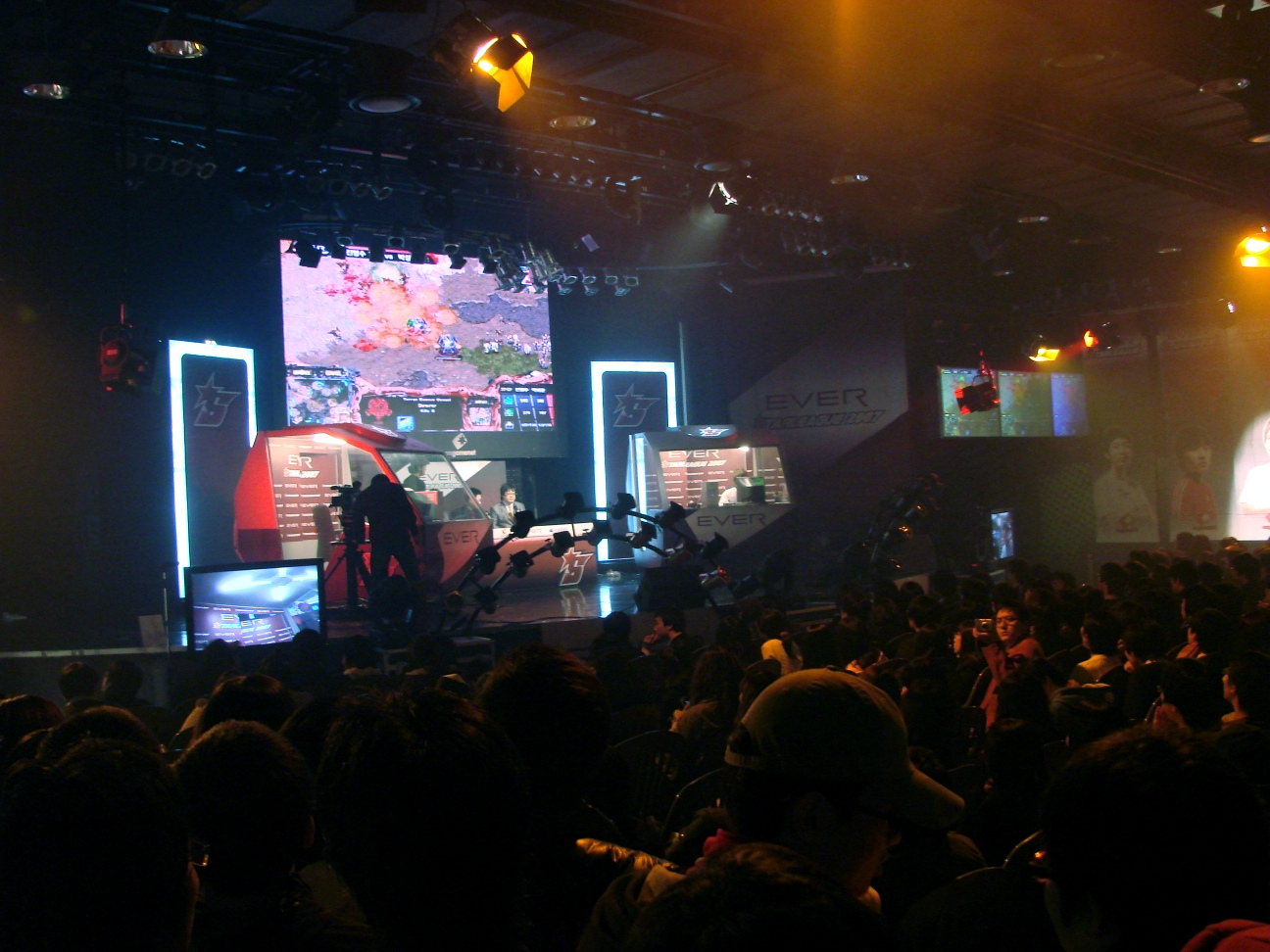
Korean ESports Stadium at Yongsan I'Park Mall

South Korea has a long standing competitive gaming culture with titles such as Brood War, League of Legends, and fighting games. Professional gaming has large following in the country, with pro players competing to win titles, and dedicating most of their time practicing.

Pro-gaming tournaments in South Korea are broadcast to millions of viewers tuning in to watch live or catch the results on one of three channels that are exclusively for esports. In South Korea, pro-gaming and esports competitions are considered a national pastime with approximately 10 million regular viewers. There are also organized leagues across the country that are funded to train gamers to compete in competitions.

Many South Koreans take pride in the country's position in pro-gaming. Tech companies invest in and sponsor esport stars. Companies have financed and coached potential gamers, including HTC, Samsung, Korea Telecom, and SK Telecom. The Korean government has also invested in esports and pro-gaming by funding the world's first esports stadium that was built in 2005. Additionally, the Korean government has a department solely focused on the governing of esports known as the Korea e-Sports Association (KeSpa).

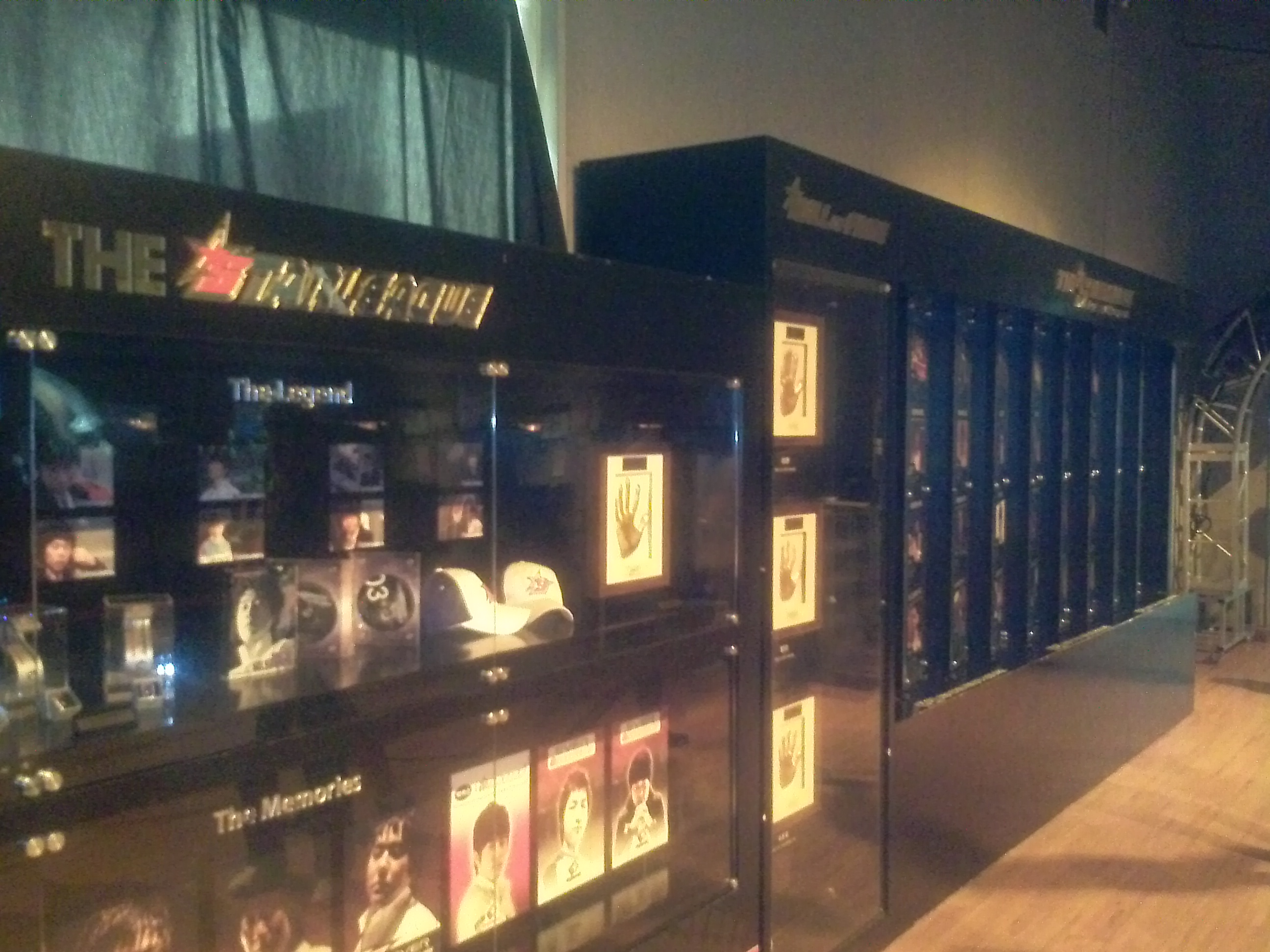
Hall of fame located at the Yongsan Esports Stadium

Throughout South Korea, pro-gamers are treated like celebrities, and it is common for successful competitors or e-sport stars to earn six-figure contracts or higher. In turn, the spotlight that these stars shine on video games helps the South Korean economy. The video game industry makes up a significant share of South Korea's GDP. It is estimated that the game market pulls in approximately 5 billion dollars annually along with the millions of dollars that are also traded in illegal gambling and betting that stimulates South Korea's informal economy.

Due to the huge popularity of esports in South Korea, the World Cyber Games was made in 2000. The Republic of Korea's Ministry of Culture and Tourism, Ministry of Information and Communications, Samsung, and Microsoft are the original sponsors. The WCG is considered to be the "Olympics of the online gaming world", and the games draw around 500 pro-gamers from around the world into competition with prizes ranging from $200,000 to $500,000.

Two particularly popular video games for pro-gamers are StarCraft and League of Legends. Well-known players include Lim Yo-Hwan, Lee Young-ho, Lee Sang-hyeok, Choi Yeon-Sung, Park Sung-Joon and Lee Jae-Dong.

== Video game addiction ==
Many studies have tried to find the connection between video game addiction and psychological conditions, such as depression and anxiety, in Korea. A Korean study reported that there was a connection between video game addiction and constraints involving recreation participation. The study also found that video game addiction was associated with experience in recreational activities as well as family environment. The level of addiction differed depending on family background, family communication, and parental monitoring. To reduce video game addictions, researchers suggested that there should be better family bonding and flexibility, like participating in various recreational activities involving family members.

Reports of video game addiction threatening the health safety of players and related incidents led to the Korean government to invest in new clinics, campaigns, and support groups to minimize the problem. By late 2011, the government took a step further and imposed the "Cinderella Law", also known as the Shutdown law, which prevents anyone aged under 16 from playing games online between 10 pm - 6 am. "Minors are required to register their national identification cards online so that they can be monitored and regulated". Another program created by the Korean government is the Jump up Internet Rescue School, a camp created to cure children who are either addicted to online games or the internet. This program was created due to the increasing number of working parents, insufficient space for playgrounds, and a highly competitive educational environment. The program involved having a wide variety of treatments for 12 days and 11 nights. The facility will allow participants to engage in outdoor activities and sports instead of playing video games. The program is divided into two stages which are training activities and educational activities. The education activity consists of mental training, brain education about the frontal lobe, emotional control, and brain system training. The role of mental and brain training is to recall the participant's cognitive skills. People who are addicted thinkers are more likely to worry than an average person which may lead to more addictive internet use. An emotional approach is implemented so that addicts can move on from gratifying sensations and feelings that make addicts come back to gaming or internet use. The four education activities listed previously are important to prevent or deter behaviours related to the internet, such as providing a mental escape, avoiding problems, and emotional beliefs, in addition to doing drugs and gambling.

Due to a failure to establish a clear definition of online video game addiction, there are complications in measuring and identifying those affected by video game addiction. There is no actual percentage regarding individuals who are addicted to video games. Researchers have conducted a questionnaire for Korean High school students to better understand video game addiction. The researchers found only a 2.7% addiction rate when it was distinguished from another peripheral criterion. The results suggest that video game addiction may not have been a prevalent issue as previously believed in South Korea

In a survey that was done in 2018 the South Korean government got a rough estimate that 10 million people were at risk of Internet Addiction. Video game addiction existed back in the early 2000s; in that decade a South Korean man died from a heart attack after playing video games for 50 hours in a PC bang where he barely slept and ate. He was also fired from his job because he didn't show up to work due to playing computer games.

== Ratings ==
Video games in Korea are rated by the Game Rating and Administration Committee, a governmental organization established in 2006. Games were previously rated by the Korea Media Rating Board (KMRB). A separate board was established in 2006 following a scandal where the KMRB was allegedly bribed to allow a video slot machine known as Sea Story to be put on the market after operators hacked the game to increase its payouts beyond legal limits.

== See also ==
- Video games in North Korea
- History of Eastern role-playing video games
- StarCraft professional competition
