= Jeffrey Anderson (game designer) =

American video game designer and entrepreneur

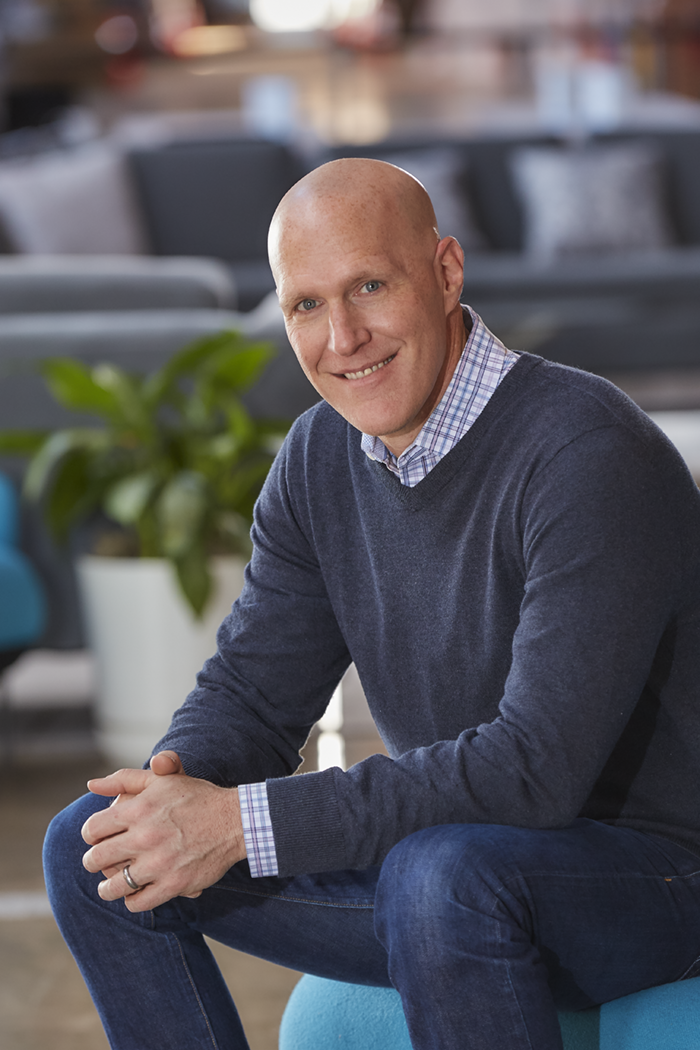
- Born: Rockford, Illinois, U.S.
- Education: BA in Economics, University of Illinois at Urbana–Champaign; Juris Doctor, University of Chicago Law School; M.Div., Duke Divinity School
- Occupations: Chief Executive Officer, Kickstand LLC
- Years active: 2011–present
- Spouses: Josette Anderson (m. 2019) Susan Anderson (deceased) (m. 1990)
- Children: 2

Jeffrey Anderson is currently serving as the founder and managing director of Kickstand, LCC. Kickstand is a boutique corporate advisory firm that offers professional guidance and consulting support to digital gaming, media, and technology companies. In this role, Anderson provides seed and venture capital as well as board management, product strategy, and marketing support.

== Biography ==
Anderson received an undergraduate degree from the University of Illinois at Urbana–Champaign where he was one in the top 3% of his graduating class. He also has a JD from the University of Chicago where he served on the University of Chicago Law Review. He is currently pursuing a Master of Divinity at Duke Divinity School.

== Gaming Career ==
After graduating from law school, he went to work as an attorney at the law firm of Holleb & Coff in Chicago, Illinois. Feeling that the legal profession was not for him, he joined with Thomas Ptak and others to start Mission Studios (which was later sold to Take-Two). After that, he moved to Los Angeles and joined Viacom's consumer products division where he worked on various initiatives from Star Trek licensing to the Bubba Gump Shrimp Company. In 1998, Electronic Arts recruited him to join its Austin, Texas studio to oversee the Ultima Online franchise along with Raph Koster and Richard Garriott.

Then, in 2001, Turbine Inc recruited him to be its president and CEO. The company had a software development agreement with Microsoft at the time to develop Asheron's Call 2, but wanted to expand the business and become the largest independent MMORPG company in the world. Anderson successfully raised capital from Highland Capital Partners and Polaris Venture Partners, and secured the rights to develop two new MMORPG games known as Dungeons & Dragons Online and The Lord of the Rings Online. He went on to raise $30 million in additional funds from Tudor Ventures and Columbia Capital for development and expansion capital. Anderson left Turbine in 2008 and the company was subsequently sold to Warner Brothers.

After a short break, Anderson went on to found Quick Hit and Quick Hit Football. This new online gaming studio developed the world's first free-to-play National Football League-licensed online football game. The company raised capital from New Enterprise Associates and had some moderate success before it was ultimately sold to Majesco in 2011. As a part of Majesco's senior executive leadership, Anderson was responsible for driving the company's social and mobile business, including the original Quick Hit Football game as well as Cooking Mama and other titles.

Once the earn-out from the sale of Majesco was over, Anderson left the company and joined the Game Show Network in 2013 as chief strategy officer under David Goldhill. Under his leadership, GSN acquired the makers of Bingo Bash and others. At the time, Bingo Bash was one the world's most profitable and successful social bingo games according to the CY16 annual report published by Eilers and Krejcik. In addition to serving as the CSO, Anderson also spent time operating GSN's many gaming divisions and apps as its executive vice president of social casino and bingo, including Bingo Bash, GSN Casino, Wheel of Fortune Slots, Fresh Deck Poker, and many more.

After nearly seven years with GSN, Anderson left the company to pursue a new opportunity with Hasbro as the head of its global gaming business. In that role, he served as the senior vice president and general manager of global gaming. At Hasbro, Anderson was responsible for driving Hasbro's portfolio of iconic game brands (such as Monopoly, Risk, Cluedo, and Game of Life) where the total value of the portfolio exceeded 700 million U.S. dollars in global annual sales. Specifically, Anderson oversaw the strong growth over Hasbro's iconic Monopoly brand which is the leader in the 7.2 billion U.S. dollars Tabletop game industry. Moreover, in 2020, Wizards of the Coast announced that its Avalon Hill brands would be moved over to Hasbro and be overseen by the gaming group. Subsequently, Hasbro announced that it was relaunching a new version of HeroQuest, the iconic role-playing game on its crowd-funding platform.

Following Hasbro, Anderson joined NCSoft West as its chief executive officer, overseeing NCSoft's gaming business in the Americas, EMEA, and Oceana regions. He was appointed to this position on July 28, 2021, replacing Songyee Yoon. As the head of NCSoft West, Anderson was in charge of the company's internal development at its first-party studio ArenaNet, publishing Aion, Blade & Soul, Fuser, Guild Wars, Lineage II, Lineage M, and the corporate operations of more than 400 employees in Aliso Viejo, Austin, Bellevue, London, and San Mateo. Under his leadership, the studio launched the third expansion pack for Guild Wars 2, entitled End of Dragons, on February 28, 2022 as well as releasing the title on Steam (service).

== Investor Activities ==
Following his departure from NCSOFT in 2023, Anderson now focuses on backing early-stage technology companies, including Stoke Space's development of fully reusable rocket technology. Additionally, he has invested in Togal.AI, Worth AI and XGEN AI, three early-stage companies focused on leveraging artificial intelligence to solve complex industrial challenges. In addition, he remains a dedicated advocate for sustainable innovation and purpose-driven capital, investing in REBEL's AI-powered e-commerce platform to address the $1 trillion retail returns marketplace. Additionally, Anderson provides strategic insights to various technology groups such as Aghanim and others.

== Investor Exits ==
- Zoovu Acquires XGEN AI to Create One AI-Native Engine for Ecommerce Product Discovery

== Awards ==
- Boston Globe 100 - Top Innovators in Massachusetts
- Law Review at the University of Chicago Law School
- Bronze Tablet - top 3% of the graduating class at the University of Illinois

== Game Credits ==
- Guild Wars 2: End of Dragons (2022)
- Bingo Bash (2020)
- GSN Casino (2020)
- Mirrorball Slots (2020)
- Grand Casino (2020)
- Quick Hit NFL Football (2020)
- Cooking Mama Friends' Café (2011)
- Bananagrams (2011)
- Parking Wars 2 (2011)
- Dungeons & Dragons Online: Eberron Unlimited (2009)
- The Lord of the Rings Online: Shadows of Angmar (2007)
- Dungeons & Dragons Online: Stormreach (2006)
- Asheron's Call: Throne of Destiny (2005)
- Asheron's Call 2: Fallen Kings (2002)
- Ultima IX: Ascension (1999)
- Ultima Online: The Second Age (1998)
- Bobby Fischer Teaches Chess (1994)
