= Openmaru =

Internet service development studio

Openmaru Studio
- Company type: Studio of NCsoft
- Industry: Web application
- Founded: 2006-08-01
- Headquarters: South Korea
- Key people: T.J. Kim, CEO; Bom Jun Kim, Chief Director
- Products: Springnote, myID.net, LemonPen, Lifepod, RollingList
- Number of employees: 100
- Website: http://www.openmaru.com/

Openmaru studio is an Internet service development studio of game company NCsoft, which is well known for Lineage, Lineage II, and Guild Wars among other MMORPGs. Openmaru was established in August 2006 to expand on its business by entering the Web application and productivity field in developing and offering new Internet services instead of limiting the company's potential to just online gaming.

Currently available services from Openmaru include myID.net, LemonPen, Lifepod, RollingList, and Springnote.

== History ==
=== Company ===
NCsoft is a well known online gaming company based in South Korea that is well known for games such as Lineage, Lineage II, and Guild Wars among many more successful online games. NCsoft Corporation was founded in 1997 followed by the commercial launching of Lineage in South Korea the following year. In 2000, NCsoft exceeded the record of 100,000 concurrent users for the first time in South Korea and soon became a registered member of Korea Stock Exchange. NCsoft continued to set new records with Lineage, by having record of 300,000 concurrent users for the first time in the world in 2001. This eventually led to the establishment of NCsoft North America (also referred to as NC Austin) in Austin, Texas with game designers Richard and Robert Garriott.

Global expansion is continuing with more subsidiary companies already established in China, Japan, UK, and Taiwan. Openmaru was established in August 2006 as a new studio separate from the already well set up gaming division of NCsoft. NCsoft is also getting into the console gaming market and has signed an exclusive game development deal with Sony Computer Entertainment in 2007 to develop games for the PlayStation Network.

=== Name ===
The name 'Openmaru' comes from two words open and maru. Open comes from the English word open, while the word maru (Korean: 마루) comes from Korean, meaning platform. Thus, the combination of the two words implies the meaning Open Platform.

=== Vision ===
As implied in the name, Openmaru envisions various services open to the public through user-generated content. Though many are interested as to why NCsoft decided to get into the Web service and application field, NCsoft strongly believes that online gaming is an Internet service available for and aimed towards everyone. Thus following the same philosophy, Openmaru was created to focus on a new field of Internet services that will be available for and aimed towards everyone.

== Products ==
=== Springnote ===
Springnote is a free WYSIWYG wiki-based online notebook web application. Springnote takes the fundamentals of wiki in terms of collaboration, fast and easy editing, wiki markups, keyboard shortcuts, and linking. Springnote can be used for a wide variety of purposes - from writing notes, scheduling, and plan projects, among many other possible scenarios. Springnote is always in write-mode, enabling users to immediately edit pages that are saved through an autosave feature. Also, any developer can develop various applications using the Springnote API and share them with others.

=== myID.net ===
myID.net logo

myID.net is an ID provider based on an ID authentication technology, OpenID, that allows the use of various services with one single digital identity. OpenID is a decentralized, free and open standard that allows Internet users to log on to many different web sites using a single digital identity, eliminating the need for a different user name and password for each site. OpenID is gaining popularity from many organizations like AOL, BBC, Microsoft, Google, IBM, VeriSign, and Yahoo! among many other organizations acting as providers. All services provided by Openmaru support OpenID authentication.

=== Lifepod ===
Lifepod is a web hosted schedule management calendar service similar to using Microsoft Outlook on the web. It consists of a schedule system, address book, and things to do.

=== RollingList ===
RollingList is a social network community for sharing information and experiences. RollingList lets users share lists on their own tastes for books, music, movies, games and so forth, which they can then share with others. RollingList allows users to socially interact with others that share the same tastes while helping broaden their own horizons through the creation of lists.

=== LemonPen ===
LemonPen lets users highlight and mark, save, or leave comments on web content for personal usage, or to share this information with others. LemonPen also has memo features are also available along with automatic saving of highlighted content from websites to a personalized page. LemonPen can be installed to a blog, used as a plug-in for Egloos, and installed as a Firefox extension.

== Sponsored Events ==
=== Winter of Code (WoC) ===
Winter of Code (WoC) 2007 graphic.

The Winter of Code (WoC) is an Openmaru sponsored open source movement in South Korea. The WoC is aimed towards college students along with a total of 9 companies, organizations, and groups including NCsoft. This program allows for students to become mentees that are guided by mentors (or experienced programmers) for about 4 months. This program is concluded with an event that allows students to share their experiences and results of their open source projects to other participants of the WoC. The first WoC began preparation in September 2006 and was held from early January through the end of March in 2007. The WoC movement is held during the same 4-month period every year.

=== Alternative Language Festival ===
The Alternative Language Festival (Korean: 대안언어축제) is a conference that is sponsored by Openmaru allows for the exchange of information on different programming languages held in South Korea. Through different programming languages, developers of different backgrounds program together and learn from each other. This is complemented with various activities along with programs and lectures. The Alternative Language Festival was first held on September 1 through September 3 in 2006 and is held every year.
