= MXM =

MXM may refer to:

- Mobile PCI Express Module (MXM, created 2011), a computing hardware standard
- Master X Master (MXM, released 2017), a video game
- MPEG eXtensible Middleware (MXM, released 2013), a video standard by the Moving Picture Experts Group
- Methoxmetamine (MXM et al), a dissociative drug
- MXM (musical duo) (2017–2018), a South Korean duo under Brand New Music
- mxmtoon (b. 2000), American singer-songwriter and internet personality
- MxM (professional wrestling) A pro wrestling tag team signed to All Elite Wrestling
