= Songyee Yoon =

South Korean businessperson (born 1975)

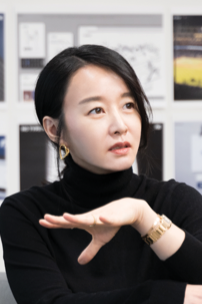
- Yoon in 2023
- Born: 26 December 1975 (age 50)
- Education: KAIST; Massachusetts Institute of Technology
- Occupations: Founder and managing partner of Principal Venture Partners (2024–present)
- Board member of: HP Inc. (2025–present)
- Spouse: Kim Taek-jin
- Website: www.songyeeyoon.org

Songyee Yoon (Korean: 윤송이; born 26 December 1975) is a venture capitalist, the founder and managing partner of Principal Venture Partners (PVP), an AI-focused investment firm established in 2024, and since 2025 a member of the board of directors of HP Inc.

She was formerly the president and chief strategy officer (CSO) of NCSoft, and also was chief executive officer (CEO) of NCSoft West. She later became the founder and managing partner of the venture capital firm Chamaeleon. Earlier in her career, she worked at McKinsey & Company and at SK Telecom, where she became the company’s first female and youngest executive team member at the age of 29.

Yoon is a trustee of the Carnegie Endowment for International Peace, and a member of the MIT Corporation. She was also an advisory board member of the Center for Asian Pacific Policy, a visiting fellow at RAND Corporation's Center to Advance Racial Equity Policy, and is currently a member of the Council of Korean Americans. She is the inspiration for the "genius girl" character in the television series KAIST.

== Education ==
Yoon was born on 26 December 1975. She attended Seoul Science High School, in Seoul's Jongno District. She graduated from Korea Advanced Institute of Science and Technology (KAIST). Yoon received a doctorate in artificial intelligence (AI) from the Massachusetts Institute of Technology's (MIT) department of brain and cognitive sciences in 2000, at the age of 24, becoming the youngest Korean to earn such a degree.

== Career ==
Early in her career, Yoon worked at the global management consulting firm McKinsey & Company and at the mobile solution developer WiderThan.com. She was named vice president of the telecommunications company SK Telecom in 2004, becoming the company's first female and youngest ever executive team member, at the age of 29.

Yoon transferred to NCSoft in the 2000s. She initially joined as the company’s chief strategy officer (CSO), and also became the chief executive officer (CEO) of NCSoft West. In 2015, she was appointed president of NCSoft, while continuing concurrently as CSO of NCSoft and CEO of NCSoft West. She has also been credited with establishing a 200-child daycare center housed in NCSoft's research and development center in Pangyo, Seongnam. Yoon was the chairperson of the NC Cultural Foundation.

Yoon was the founder and managing partner of Chamaeleon, a Silicon Valley–based venture capital firm. In 2024, she founded Principal Venture Partners (PVP), a venture fund dedicated to investing in AI-native startups.

She is a trustee of the Carnegie Endowment for International Peace, and a member of the MIT Corporation. As a member of the advisory council at Stanford University's Institute for Human-Centered Artificial Intelligence, she studies the social impacts of AI and the ethics of technology. Yoon was also an advisory board member of the Center for Asian Pacific Policy and a visiting fellow at RAND Corporation's Center to Advance Racial Equity Policy. She has been on the Asia Business Leaders Advisory Council, which is convened by the Asia Pacific Foundation of Canada. She has been a member of the Council of Korean Americans since 2020.

Yoon has been described as a prodigy of business, information technology (IT), and science. In 2004, The Wall Street Journal named her one of the world's 50 most promising and influential businesswomen. She is the inspiration for the television series KAIST, in which Lee Na-young portrays an engineering prodigy.

== Personal life ==
Yoon married Kim Taek-jin, NCSoft's founder and CEO, in 2007. The couple has two children. Yoon is a member of the Yun family, described by Worth magazine as "one of the most successful families in the world", which also includes her eleventh cousin Joon Yun. She is popularly known as "Genius Girl" for her young academic achievements.

== See also ==
- List of Massachusetts Institute of Technology alumni
