= Lineage W =

MMORPG video game

- Developer: Studio W
- Publishers: NCSoft (Worldwide excpet Southeast Asia); NCV Games (Southeast Asia)
- Series: Lineage
- Platforms: Microsoft Windows; Android; iOS
- Release: AS: November 4, 2021; SEA: May 27, 2026; WW: TBA
- Genre: MMORPG
- Mode: Multiplayer

Lineage W is a massively multiplayer online role-playing game (MMORPG) developed and published by NCSoft. It is a fifth major installment of the Lineage series by using all elements from Lineage game and sharing some elements with the Lineage II title. The game was announced in August 2021, and released for Android, iOS, and Microsoft Windows operating systems on November 4 of the same year in East Asia. The game supports cross-platform play between mobile, PCs, and consoles.

Although the game was set for worldwide release in 2021, it is still unavailable in regions outside of Asia. The game is also set to be released for the PlayStation 5 and Nintendo Switch.

== Development and release ==
The week before THE WORLD showcase events, NCSoft announced that a new Lineage game will be the largest launching title ever. It was initially targeted for worldwide launch with most platforms supported. Later, NCsoft has updated the website to reveal more information and open for pre-registration. NCSoft CCO Taek Jin Kim marked this game as "the final Lineage".

Lineage W introduces a single build for the global market to create a global battle community. Players from different countries can cooperate and compete in a single server. In order to convert all elements in Lineage from 2.5D to 3D, NCSoft has used Unreal Engine 4 to develop this game. It supports NCSoft in-house AI-Translation that can translate the chat/community/communication in real-time to the player. Voice-to-text is also included in-game to make easy communication between players.

Lineage W was launched in Asian regions on 4 November 2021.

== Reception ==
Prior to its release, the game had mixed expectations from users and industry experts. Players were concerned with pay-to-win mechanics ported from former titles by NCSoft.

Despite popular concern, Lineage W topped the Google Store and iOS Store charts in South Korea for several days after its release. It is estimated that the game earned 16 billion won every day during the first four days of its release, breaking record of highest first-day revenue a game from the company ever had. The game remained at the number one spot on Google Play in South Korea for a full month after its release, with estimated sales of more than 200 billion won (166 million dollars) by December 2021.

Although Lineage W was successful in the Korean and Taiwanese markets, it did not find similar success in other Asian markets. Notably in Japan, the second largest gaming market in Asia, the game found disappointing sale figures, with similar poor performance in countries like Singapore and the United Arab Emirates. This came as a surprise, as Lineage W was aimed to cater to the overseas market. The financial underperformance of Lineage W outside South Korea and Taiwan may be one of the factors behind NCSoft's hesitation to release the game in Europe and North America, as well as the shutdown of its subsidiary, Ntreev Soft.
