= Exteel =

2007 video game

- Developer: NCSoft
- Publisher: NCSoft
- Designers: Shin, Young Taek
- Composer: Inon Zur
- Engine: Unreal Engine 2 (modified)
- Platform: Microsoft Windows
- Release: KOR: December 4, 2007; NA: December 4, 2007; Service discontinued: September 1, 2010
- Genres: Third-person shooter, multiplayer online game
- Mode: Multi-player

Exteel was a third-person shooter game published by NCSoft, a Korean game company, and was developed by NCSOFT's E & G Studios. Players controlled giant vehicles called Mechanaughts ("mecha") and fought against the computer, or against other online players, in a variety of gameplay modes. The Mechanaughts were customizable. The game was free to download and play, but players could buy "NCcoins" with real money, through the NCcoin micropayment system. NCcoins could be used to purchase exclusive in-game weapons, skills, and parts.

Exteel was released on December 4, 2007. It was terminated on September 1, 2010, when all international servers were permanently shutdown. The Chinese version of Exteel was known as G7 online and was published by PlayNC, a branch of NCSOFT.

== Backstory ==
The first part of Exteel's official back-story was posted to GameZone.com in June 2008. It described a violent conflict in the distant future from a first-person point of view (with in-universe tone).

Accordingly, a group of colonists had settled on the planet of Natha on the untamed continent of Taryn, the primary setting of the game. Over the course of thirty years, as the colony grew and advanced technologically, territories were slowly drawn up. Borders were reinforced by immigrants, trying to escape the Federation, from other planets such as Mars, Jupiter, and Saturn. Given these beginnings, weapons and fighting were almost unheard of on Natha in its early existence, and were not easily resurrected. To settle these disputes, mercenaries in battle-hardened Mechanaughts were hired by the four major nations on the planet: the subterranean-dwelling Marston, the financially prosperous Palamo, the newcomer and only recently independent West Palamo, and the technologically advanced Aiers. In time, small border conflicts grew between the government houses. Marston declared war on Palamo, after a village within Marston territory was destroyed. Palamo, claiming innocence, retaliated, and thus began the conflict around which the game is centered. The unnamed narrator wonders when the fighting will end and who will win the long war for independence fought on various planets. No mention or indication of extraterrestrial life was made in the game.

Players assume the role of mercenaries fighting in endless battles across the developed continent, almost unrestrained by the governments who hired them.

== Gameplay ==
Players started off with a free, cheap Mechanaught. Credits were used to purchase new parts, weapons, and skills, or secondary items such as repair points or paint and acquired through the various game modes. Some parts were purchased with real money via the NCcoin micropayment system. Most items in the game were purchased using credits or NCcoins. Most items in the game were bought for a time-limit or, for a higher price, a level of durability. If the time limit or the durability points of the item ran out, then the item was lost and had to be repurchased or the item had to be repaired, respectively.

Durability was based on the time that a player spent in game, whereas time-limit was based on the length of time after an item was purchased, regardless of whether or not a player actively played the game. The rate at which durability of items was lost was dependent on the price of the item, with cheaper items losing durability at a slower rate than more expensive items. For all items, the time-limit was 7 or 30 days, depending on the item. Durability of items was restored by using repair points, which could be purchased with credits. Repair points were the only items in the game that did not have durability or a time-limit, and the player could keep the repair points until they were used.

Mechanaught performance was based on multiple factors that attributed to its stats. Heavy-class mechs often had more HP, EN, and SP—stats, improving its resilience in battle, but tended to be slower and easier to hit. Light-class mechs were the opposite, favoring speed and agility. Standard-class lingered in the middle. Parts from each class could be mixed and matched when building a Mechanaught. Weapons contributed less to player's overall stats but carried stats of their own, regarding their performance. Some weapons were held with two hands, while others were mounted in each hand. Any weapon produced a given amount of heat when fired, ultimately overheating the weapon until a cooldown period had elapsed. At that point, the player could switch to a secondary set of weapons, or wait for the weapons to cool down to be used again.

Skills were purchased to add another form of attack. With their own cooldown rate, skills were used when there was enough SP accrued in a given battle.

Combat and its objectives were determined by the game mode the players chose. Points were scored based on number of kills, contrasted to number of deaths, number of Aerogates in possession, number of flags captured, or ability to defend base towers. The winner was a team with the highest point total or with their towers still standing.

== Modes of play ==
Most matches centered around specified markers in the battlefield map called "aerogates". These were points of occupation that had to be defended against for a positive outcome. An invading player could step onto an aerogate, to begin a capture process which took several seconds. Multiple allied players standing on an aerogate increased the rate of capture.

Around most aerogates, there was a small number (usually 1–2) of healing pads, which restored the health points (HP) of a player's mechanaught. However, healing pads had both a limited time of use for the allied side, and they needed time to restore themselves before they could be used again. Enemy players could utilize allied healing pads when they captured the associated aerogate first.

=== Player-vs-player games ===
==== Death Match ====
This is a traditional Deathmatch, where each player could fight every other player. Healing pads were absent. Aerogates could not be captured, but they still acted as spawn points.

==== Team Death Match ====
Team Death Match was referred to as "TDM". Similar to Deathmatch, the key difference to deathmatch was that players were sorted into two teams, red and blue. Whilst healing pads were still absent in TDM, players with rectifier units were capable of restoring the HP of their teammates.

==== Territory Control ====
In game, Territory Control is shortened to "TC". TC required greater strategy and skill than other game modes. As a result, players were frustrated when novice players failed to stay in designated locations, leaving the aerogates unguarded, resulting in the loss of the aerogate to the other team. Gameplay in TC was reminiscent to Battlefield, where each team had to capture aerogates in order to accumulate points. At the end of the round, the team with the most points won. The team could also win if they captured the enemy's base.

==== Capture the Flag ====
Players were split into two teams. It is similar to Territory Control, but with added objective of making it to the enemy team's home aerogate and stealing their flag. The winning team was decided by which side captured the opponent's flag most often, within the 10 minutes of game play. If both teams captured the same amount of flags, then the match ended in a draw. If a player holding a flag was destroyed, the flag was restored when an opponent ran or touched the flag that was standing on the ground; the exception was that an allied player could grab the stranded flag before that happened.

Unlike Territory Control, the number of aerogates occupied did not determine the winning team. If a team's flag was taken, that team lost, even if they occupied the majority of aerogates. When a player captured an enemy flag, it appeared on the back of their mechanaught for everyone to see, and increased the EN drain of jumping and boosting, as well as cut their max EN in half. Speed was reduced by 10%.

The goal was to eliminate opponents on the way, while protecting the flag.

=== Player-vs-computer games ===
==== Last Stand ====
Also called "LS", players were lumped into one team (up to 8), and they fought together to destroy large numbers of computer-controlled drone mechanaughts. The drones appeared in 2 large groups, at one location near the allied aerogates. The allies' objective was to defend the aerogates against these assaults. If one aerogate was captured by the drones, the game ended early in a defeat. The resistance of the drones was increased only according to the difficulty level set by the master of the room before the game was started. The higher the difficulty level was set (ranging from 1 to 3), the higher score there was with each drone kill for the player(s). The number of drones that spawned per wave was dependent upon the number of players in the match before the wave started. Competitions took place throughout every week. These "weeklies" awarded credits to players who managed to accumulate the highest number of points. The credits were awarded at every regular server maintenance on Wednesdays at 10 A.M. CDT.

An additional feature was present in Last Stand, which did not exist in all other game modes. Whereas in other modes, it was player-versus-player, and players had to depend on allied healing pads and allied Rectifiers to restore the HP level, in Last Stand mode, it provided a unique full-restoration 'Healing Skill' option available to all players in the fifth Skill slot. When a player pressed the "5" key on their keypad, their mechanaught had its HP restored to full health, regardless of how much damage it received. For preventing this feature from being consistently used to avoid damage altogether, the 'Healing Skill' took one minute to renew itself, and was shown by remaining dark until it was ready to be used again. Unlike regular-combat Skills which had to be purchased out-of-game in the Store menu, the 'Healing Skill' was not required to be purchased, and did not require SP to use. The only limit on its use was the cooldown activated after using it.

For both Territory Control and Capture the Flag, stationary drone mechanaughts with powerful long-range siege cannons or rockets appeared to automatically defend allied aerogates. If an aerogate was captured, the drones were to be destroyed for allied drones to appear. Unlike the drones in Last Stand, however, those had better armor, requiring more hits for a single drone. If destroyed, a drone automatically re-spawned after 30 seconds. If an aerogate was neutral (i.e. had not been fully captured), no guarding drones appeared.

== Development and release ==
Exteel was developed by NCSoft's internal development team, Team Beam.

Exteel was announced at E3 2005. The director of Team Beam said the E3 version was based on a prototype at version 0.3. NCSoft revealed the CGI trailer on 10 October 2005.

In December 2009, NCSoft terminated its license to Exteel SEA. In addition, IAM-Interactive removed its forum and website contents, replacing them with an advisory to consume all coins within 30 days, despite Exteel game servers being offline at the time. The primary reasons for shutting down were a lack of financial stable income and NCSoft losing a lawsuit that resulted in a loss of 28 million dollars.

On 29 July 2010, NCSoft announced it would terminate all supports for Exteel. The servers were shut down on 1 September.

== Reception ==
In a review in December 2008, ThisIsGame praised the mecha action gameplay, which it found was improved from the launch state in January 2006, but addressed the lackluster animations for the robots. It also found the game balance ofExteel hostile to the newcomers due to the lack of proper starting gears for them, and criticized its microtransaction economics skewed toward long-time players.
