= Gem Keeper =

2011 video game

- App icon
- Developer(s): NCSoft
- Publisher(s): NCSoft
- Platform(s): iOS
- Release: October 14, 2011
- Genre(s): Tower defense
- Mode(s): Single-player

Gem Keeper is a 2011 tower defense game developed and published by the South Korean studio NCSoft. It was released on October 14, 2011, for iOS.

== Gameplay and release ==
Gem Keeper is a tower defense video game. In each of the game's 30 levels, the player must place towers to attack incoming enemies.

The game was released for iOS on October 14, 2011, and was updated with Game Center support in November 2011.

== Reception ==
Reception

Aggregate score
Aggregator	Score
Metacritic	84/100

Review scores
Publication	Score
Pocket Gamer	3.5/5
TouchArcade	4/5
148Apps	4.5/5
AppSpy	4/5

On Metacritic, Gem Keeper has a "generally favorable" rating of 84% based on five critics.

The game received multiple positive reviews.
