= Kim Taek-jin =

South Korean businessman and engineer (born 1967)

- 김택진
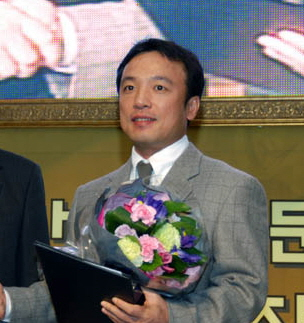
- Kim in 2007
- Born: March 14, 1967 (age 59); Seoul, South Korea
- Education: Seoul National University (B.S., M.S.)
- Occupations: Businessman, software engineer
- Employer: NCSoft
- Spouse: Songyee Yoon (m. 2007)
- Children: 4

Korean name
- Hangul: 김택진
- Hanja: 金澤辰
- RR: Gim Taekjin
- MR: Kim T'aekchin

Kim Taek-jin (Korean: 김택진; born March 14, 1967) is a South Korean businessman and software engineer. He is co-chairman of video game developer NCSoft, the second largest video game company in the country.

He is among the richest people in South Korea. In December 2024, Forbes estimated his net worth to be US$1 billion and ranked him 32nd richest in the country.

== Biography ==
He was born on March 14, 1967 in Seoul, South Korea. He is the eldest of two sons and one daughter born to father Kim I-min (김이민) and Jang Sun-rye (장순례).

He graduated from Daeil High School in 1985. He studied electrical engineering at Seoul National University, where he received a bachelor's degree (1989) and master's degree (1991). He pursued a doctoral degree there as well, but dropped out of the program in 1997.

In 1989, he jointly developed the Hangul word processor. He was a founder of software company Hanmesoft in 1989. From 1991 to 1992, to fulfill his mandatory military service, he worked in a Hyundai Electronics R&D center in Boston, United States. From 1995 to 1996, he was a lead developer for Hyundai Electronics. After returning to South Korea, he founded one of the earliest South Korean web portals Aminet (아미넷).

In March 1997, he founded NCSoft and has been its CEO ever since. In March 1998, NCSoft launched South Korea's first MMORPG game, Lineage. The game was immediately very popular in South Korea and Taiwan. The success of the game led to NCSoft being listed on the South Korean stock exchange KOSDAQ in July 2000. The company became publicly traded in 2003. In 2012, he sold most of his shares in the company to Nexon; by 2024 he held just under 12% of company shares. Forbes reported that Nexon sought increasingly more influence in the company over time, and by the 2020s was engaging in a battle to pressure the company to decrease the influence of Kim, his wife, and younger brother. His younger brother, Kim Taek-heon (김택헌), stepped down from his vice president position in the company in 2023. Byungmoo Park became co-CEO of the company in March 2024; they announced that Kim would focus on the game development and creative aspects of the company's portfolio, while Park would focus on the business aspects.

In March 2011, he founded the professional baseball team NC Dinos. He has remained the team's owner since.

== Personal life ==
He was married to a woman with the surname Jeon (전), with whom they had two sons, but they divorced in November 2004. He gave her stocks worth ₩30 billion upon the divorce. He remarried to Songyee Yoon in November 2007, and they had two more sons together.

In an interview, he claimed to go to bed very early (around 7 p.m.) and wake up very early (at midnight or 1 a.m.).
