= Lineage 2: Revolution =

2016 mobile MMORPG video game

- Developer: Netmarble Neo
- Publisher: Netmarble
- Series: Lineage
- Engine: Unreal Engine 4
- Platforms: Android, iOS, iPadOS
- Release: KOR: December 14, 2016; WW: November 15, 2017
- Genre: MMORPG
- Mode: Multiplayer

Lineage 2: Revolution is a massively multiplayer online role-playing game (MMORPG) developed by Netmarble for mobile platforms under license from NCSoft, taking place 100 years before the events of NCSoft's Lineage II: Goddess of Destruction storyline. It is part of the Lineage series.

Lineage 2 was released on 14 December 2016 for Android and iOS.

== Gameplay ==
Players create a character and choose a race. Available races are Human, Elf, Dark Elf, Dwarf, Orc, and, in the latest update, Kamael. Each race specializes later in different classes, such as warrior, mage, and archer. The player progresses through the game by taking quests and killing mobs. The vast majority of the game, though, is afk grinding.

The game is set in the same world of Lineage II, originally released in 2003, and features instanced dungeons, player versus player (PvP), clan wars, raids and a series of quests to advance the storyline. However, the gameplay has been specifically adapted to better fit mobile devices by Netmarble; for example, quests are automated, with the character executing them automatically and even killing enemies alone after selecting a quest.

== Development and release ==
Lineage 2: Revolution was developed by Netmarble Neo, a joint company created from Turnon Games, Nurien Soft, and Reborn Games. It was designed as a mobile adaptation of Lineage II. It was first released in South Korea on November 14, 2016. It launched in western countries on November 15, 2017. The game was set to release in Japan in the third quarter of 2017, followed by China in the fourth.

== Reception ==
Reception

Aggregate score
Aggregator	Score
Metacritic	74/100

Review score
Publication	Score
TouchArcade	5/5

By December 2017, the game had crossed the $100 million mark within 18 days. By January 2017, the game had grossed ₩206.5 million ($176.6 million) within its first month in South Korea. Overseas, it became the top-grossing app on Apple's App Store in Japan just 18 hours after its debut, and surpassed 1 million pre-registrations for the US and Europe launch, generating 45% of Netmarble's revenues as of September 2017. The game went on to gross $980 million worldwide in 2017, becoming the year's seventh highest-grossing mobile game. As of December 2018, the game has more than 30 million players. It grossed over $1.5 billion worldwide by January 2019, and has grossed $1.7 billion as of October 2019.
