= Shin Il-Sook =

South Korean comic artist (born 1962)

- 신일숙
- Born: January 21, 1962; Andong
- Occupation: Manhwaga

Shin Il-Sook (Korean: 신일숙; born January 21, 1962) is a Korean manhwaga, perhaps best known for her series The Four Daughters of Armian (1986-1996). Her works of fantasy and science fiction are known for their strong female characters.

Shin Il-Sook was born on January 21, 1962 in Andong, North Gyeongsang Province, South Korea. She made her manhwa debut in 1984 with The Princess of the Lion. Her popular series The Four Daughters of Armian, referred to as "A4" by many fans, follows the adventures of four princesses in the fictional kingdom of Armian, drawn from her interest in Herodotus' Histories and the Greco-Persian Wars. Born in 1999 (1988) follows the heroine Crystal and other superpowered people who fight off an alien invasion. Her series Riniji ("Lineage", 1993) inspired the popular MMORPG Lineage, which had over a million players by its second year. Other works of hers include Athens of Love, The Pharaoh's Lover (2002), My Eve, and Kaya (2017).

Shin was one of the cartoonists featured on the Korean webcomics platform N4, which quickly went defunct after its 2000 debut. In 2025, she debut her work Manu's Daughters on Naver Webtoon, which draws on similar inspiration as Armian. as it features four princess, daughters of Queen Manu. She credits feminist works like Armian and Manu's Daughters to her teenage interest in Greek and Roman mythology: "The goddesses in Greek mythology were mystical and political. That’s when I first thought women could rule the world"

Shin served two terms as president of the Korea Cartoonist Association, from 2020 to 2026. She won the Outstanding Junior Award - awarded to cartoonists under the age of 55 - at the 2018 Bucheon International Comics Festival and the 2017 Seoul International Cartoon & Animation Festival Comic Award.
