= Quick Hit Football =

2010 video game

Quick Hit Football NFL
- Developer: Play Hard Sports
- Director: Trevor Stricker
- Producer: Jeffrey Anderson
- Designers: Dave Zdyrko, Jeremy Stein
- Platforms: Adobe Flash, Unity Player
- Release: September 2009, September 8, 2010 (NFL)
- Genre: Sports simulation
- Modes: Single-player, multiplayer

Quick Hit Football (QHF) was a free online American football game. The Quick Hit company was started in 2008 by Jeffrey Anderson, and went public in September 2009. Quick Hit Football offered single player against CPU opponents and multi-player against human opponents. Quick Hit Football was based on user play-calling. On September 8, 2010, the NFL was integrated into Quick Hit Football and was granted the official license from the NFL. A few months later, on December 22, 2010, Quick Hit Football was offered in High-Definition 3D, allowing greater immersion of the participant in the game, while maintaining a realistic sense of play with graphics likened to those found on Madden 64. Following this, new games and challenges were offered to the players such as NFL season games, as well as single player games vs. teams inspired by legendary football coaches such as Bill Cowher, Tom Landry, Vince Lombardi, Brian Billick, Dan Reeves, Marty Schottenheimer, and Dick Vermeil.

== Gameplay ==

Quick Hit Football gameplay revolves around the user's coaching ability. The user may call a play from the QHF playbook, and then use any boosters that the user wishes to buy. Any boosters received may be used once in each game. A booster must be used before the play begins. When calling the play, a user may scroll through a list of plays, or filter through the plays in three ways: Type, Category, and Key Player.

Once the play starts, the user becomes a bystander and is not allowed to control any player movement. Scoring follows NFL football rules. As in NFL football, the team with the most points at the end of regulation wins. Single-player regulation consists of four two-minute quarters, while multi-player games feature four two and a half minute quarters.

During the game, a user's team receives fantasy points based on the performance of the players. These points help the user improve the team, allowing QHF players to reach higher levels. To level QHF players up, a user spends 1,000 Coaching Points (CP) to move a player up one level, though they may choose to move a player up multiple levels in one transaction. Additionally, Coaching Points and another currency, Quick Cash (QC), can be purchased in various increments from $5 to $50. "Legend" players cost extra but automatically leveled up with you as you progressed in the game and became very popular.

CP and QC can both be used to purchase new plays from the store, including contributions from ex-NFL head coaches Dan Reeves, Marty Schottenheimer, and Dick Vermeil. Both currencies can also be used to purchase new players, which range from customizable nobodies to NFL legends such as Warren Moon, Jack Tatum, Barry Sanders, and Jack Youngblood, who have a higher skill rating than the average player and also automatically level up with you for free. NFL legends are rated on a 10-star scale, with 10-star Elite players being available for purchase only with QC, that is, real money. QH added several new gaming modes from shorter 5 minute Blitz games to longer 5 minutes per quarter Marathon games.

== Critical reception ==
IGN stated that Quick Hit Football "offers an authentic, strategic football game without the twitch and complexity." However, IGN also said that, "The look of everything in QuickHit Football isn't super-detailed, but that's only because the system requirements are a browser, an Internet connection and Flash player. When you zoom in on the field you'll definitely see added detail to the players, but nothing in the game will knock your socks off." Game Informer said in its preview that the game provides "ease of play calling, and surface decisions that allow you to get in and play quickly" while also adding "more depth for hardcore players" GameSpy suggested Quick Hit Football "offers an authentic, strategic football game" and said that, "The game is designed for football fans who want the depth and appeal of fantasy sports with the interactivity and polish of high-end console products."

== Shut down ==
Despite the game's dedicated community, its revenue was lacking. Quick Hit Football required far more manpower and servers to support everything than what the game was making, even with the NFL license and related marketing. As part of Majesco's cost-cutting plan announced on July 15, 2012, Quick Hit Football's servers would be closed August 17, 2012. On the day of its shutdown, however, an unspecified agreement was reached between Majesco, the game's operators, and the game's creditors, MMF, ensuring that the football title would live on. Majesco's continued fiscal struggles led to further cuts, including the dissolution of their Foxborough Massachusetts Social Games Division on January 7, 2013. All thirteen developers were released and their online games would stop working within two months. Quick Hit Football permanently shut down on March 22, 2013.
