= Master X Master =

- Developer: Studio MXM
- Publisher: NCSoft
- Engine: Gamebryo
- Release: June 21, 2017

Master X Master (MXM) is a multiplayer online battle arena (MOBA) video game developed and published by NCsoft.

== Gameplay ==
Generic map of a MOBA-genre game. Yellow lines are the "lanes" where action is focused; blue and red dots are the defensive "towers/turrets" that defend them; light-colored quarter circles are the teams' bases; and blue and red corners are the structures whose destruction claims victory.

MXM was a MOBA with third-person shooter characteristics. Each player controlled two playable characters known as "Masters". There were 30 Masters as of January 2016. Each had unique abilities and different styles of play. The Masters were characters from previous NCsoft-published games, as well as new characters. The player could switch between two Masters throughout the game, where the unused Master could regenerate its health. There was a cooldown associated with switching, as well as death. The player in MXM used the WASD keys and computer mouse to move and point the character, though the game provided the option for the player to move the character solely with the mouse. Switching the Masters used the mouse wheel. Each Master had four special abilities, with one ability a more-powerful move, and each of these abilities had a cooldown. Also uncharacteristically, the game allowed player characters to jump and dodge enemy attacks. Using the mouse to aim, many of the game's abilities were based on projectiles and skill shots.

NCsoft planned to restrict gameplay on the large maps to the genre-standard two teams of five players, while smaller teams would have smaller maps, which would force player interaction. Both large and small maps will have three lanes with which to attack the opposing team's base. It was played in matches between two teams who each occupy their own base on the map.

The game had a science fiction setting. The game provided player versus environment (PvE) missions, uncharacteristic to the genre, as well as the characteristic player versus player (PvP) game mode. There were other game modes: team deathmatch, point control, AOS, and arena. The PvE mode was co-operative, meaning it allowed up to four players an action role-playing game experience: The players selected characters to play through a number of stages against computer-controlled enemies, ending each stage with a battle against a level boss. In this mode, the character progression was permanent.

In the "Titan" mode of gameplay, which was a variant of point control, completing an objective would allow a team to summon a temporary super-creature called a Titan to their side to attack the enemy base. GameZone originally reported that the objective was defeating multiple enemies, while IGN reported that capturing and holding control points would cause the Titan to spawn. To end a game in this mode, the team must either have the most points at the end of the timed match, or must reach a point threshold.

== Development ==
NCsoft was beta testing the game in South Korea in October 2014, and was NCsoft's first internally-developed MOBA. Engadget did not know of a release or localization date at that time, but also reported a month later that NCsoft planned to release a mobile version of the game.

In mid-2015, NCsoft planned to release the game in a beta version globally in early 2016, with a later full-release of the game the same year. The game was still in beta test only in South Korea. In January 2016, NCsoft announced the launch of the game for personal computer in the second half of 2016 for Europe and North America. NCsoft did not announce a pay model.

In June 2016, NCsoft provided free game keys for a brief alpha playtest on personal computer, which focused on PvP interactions and some PvE content. Both Polygon and VideoGamer cooperated with NCsoft to provide keys to their readers.

The game was developed for cloud technology.

The game's design philosophy was based on team work. NCsoft said that the reason for the "long" deaths was to ensure players keep their teams in mind. The PvE in the game was designed to teach players their heroes. The matches were designed to last approximately ten minutes.

The game was free-to-play.

== Reception ==
Reception

Aggregate score
Aggregator	Score
Metacritic	76/100

=== Pre-release ===
GameZone was overall "impressed". IGN thought there was a lot of potential.

The game was compared to Heroes of the Storm, Smite, Diablo, The Incredible Adventures of Van Helsing, and Torchlight. IGN also commented on the crowd of MOBAs with which MXM would need to compete, noting that "standing out" would likely be challenging. Engadget suggested "it might be different enough from its contemporaries to pique your interest", while IGN thought the publisher's experience with world-building helped to differentiate the gameplay modes.

GameZone praised the aesthetics, saying that the palette adds to the game's setting. He also praised the level design. IGN thought some of the characters were generic, but was impressed with the detail of the character design, and was expectant for future releases.

IGN called the action "over the top" and said the gameplay was designed for action players.

GameZone was surprised at the length of the time the player needed to wait before respawning.

GameZone called the two-Master aspect the most unique aspect of the game, while IGN called it "an inventive system that adds a whole new layer of strategy to battle". Previewers at both GameZone and IGN thought the swapping difficult at-first but quickly adjusted. IGN wasn't sure how veterans of the genre would react to it.

GameZone thought the game provided a good learning curve.

IGN called the control scheme easy to use, "unorthodox", and "unique", which "gave the combat more of an arcade feel". The IGN previewer "felt like he had more opportunities to cut loose, rather than staying focused and determined at all times in other titles" due to the controls. GameZone thought the game was "easier to grasp than other MOBA's".

IGN thought the most interesting aspect was the player versus environment mode, which is fully fleshed out. The previewer thought this was refreshing since other genre titles overlook the character and plot.

IGN called the Titan game mode "a cool take on faction battles", which "offered the most intense and pure gameplay in MXM".

== Closure ==
In November 2017, NCsoft decided to close the game on January 31, 2018.
