= Throne and Liberty =

2023 video game

- Developer: FirstSpark Games
- Publishers: KR/TW/AS/SEA: NC Corporation (Note: NC Corporation will provide services only in South Korea, Taiwan, Asia, and Southeast Asia through PC NC Purple version.); EU/AS/RU: Astrum Entertainment (Note: Astrum Entertainment will provide services only in Russia, Eastern Europe, and Middle Asia markets.); WW: Amazon Games (Note: Amazon Games will provide services only in North America, Western Europe, and Japan. As well as in Region 1 sections including South Korea, Taiwan, Asia, and Southeast Asia, and the PlayStation 5, Xbox Series X/S, and PC Steam versions.)
- Director: Park Geonsoo
- Designer: Han Jungyeon
- Programmer: Kim Myeongkwan
- Artist: Kim Jeonggeun
- Writers: Park ChangSoo; Park Sunhee; Choi Yoonkwang; Ham Jekyun; Kim Heejung
- Composers: Juman Lee; Jinock Kim; Kiung Baek; Chanju Kwon (Note: Additional music by Benjamin Wallfisch, Lorne Balfe, Saulius Petreikis, Sebastian Böhm, Apollon de Moura, Amadeus Indetzki, Michal Cielecki, Max Cameron, Benjamin Botkin, Thomas Adam Habuda, Mattia Turzo, Edouard Brenneisen, Unique Horn Studio, and Yohei Kuriko)
- Series: Lineage; Novcrea Universe
- Engine: Unreal Engine 4
- Platforms: Microsoft Windows; PlayStation 5 Xbox Series X/S
- Release: KR: December 7, 2023; AS/SEA: July 24, 2024; NA/EU/JP: October 1, 2024, RU: May 19, 2026
- Genre: MMORPG
- Mode: Multiplayer

Throne and Liberty is a massively multiplayer online role-playing game (MMORPG) developed by FirstSpark Games and published by NCSoft through NC Purple platform for Microsoft Windows. It was also published by Amazon Games through Steam, as well as on PlayStation 5 and Xbox Series X/S.

The game was announced in 2011 as Lineage Eternal and originally part of the Lineage series, but was repurposed and restructured well into development. The game suffered numerous delays in its release schedule. The first South Korea closed beta took place in 2016. NCSoft renamed the game into the current name in 2022.

== Development and release ==
The game has suffered from numerous delays during development. NCSoft officially announced Lineage Eternal as the sequel to the first Lineage, released in 1998, in November 2011. The first gameplay videos debuted at the G-Star 2011 gaming convention in South Korea on November 9. In August 2013, NCSoft was preparing to roll out the beta schedule of Lineage Eternal by the end of that year. The developers planned to initiate beta testing in Korea towards the end of year of 2015, but during a conference call in November, they confirmed that closed beta testing would be delayed until 2016. A closed beta in Korea was scheduled for November 2016.

By March 2017, the development team's leadership for Lineage Eternal was changed due to the results of the closed beta, according to NCSoft. The game was delayed by August when NCSoft moved from a proprietary game engine that was used in Guild Wars to Unreal Engine 4. By November, the game was called Project TL.

By February 2022, Project TL was expected to launch in the second half of the year. The game was officially rebranded as Throne and Liberty the following month.

Amazon acquired the publishing rights in 2023 and planned to release Throne and Liberty in Americas, Europe, and Japan, for PC, PlayStation 5, and Xbox Series X/S with full cross-platform support. An open beta started in July 2024, and was scheduled to be released on September 17. The beta attracted nearly 60,000 players at launch and leveled off to around 38,000 by the next day.

In July 2024, the Korean version of the game received the Leap Update, which added a multi-level challenge dungeon, new life skills, a boost server, and a skill system that lets players customize weapon abilities. The updates were carried over to the global version when it launched in September. NCSoft expanded service to 19 countries in Asia, Eastern Europe, and the Middle East.

After early access started on September 26, the game was released on October 1. Within its first week, the game attracted over 3 million players worldwide, with over 24 million hours of gameplay recorded.

In September–October 2025, NCSoft announced that Amazon Game Studios will expand its services to players in Region 1—including South Korea, Taiwan, Asia, Eastern Europe, and the Middle East—allowing players in these regions to access Throne and Liberty through Steam, as well as providing official support for console versions. However, the service via the NC Purple platform will continue to operate independently. On May 7, 2026, NC Corporation announced that Throne and Liberty will expand its services to players in Russia, Eastern Europe, and the Middle East that will cover 11 countries, including Georgia, Moldova, Belarus, Armenia, Azerbaijan, Kazakhstan, Uzbekistan, Kyrgyzstan, Tajikistan, and Turkmenistan with partnership with Astrum Entertainment, leading game publisher in Russia.

== Reception ==
Reception

Aggregate score
Aggregator	Score
Metacritic	(PC) 73/100

Throne and Liberty received "mixed or average" reviews from critics, according to review aggregator Metacritic.

Earlier, Throne and Liberty experienced a strong launch, particularly on Steam, when it was released on October 1, 2024, for PlayStation 5, Xbox Series X|S, and PC. The game climbed to become the No. 4 most-played game on Steam, reaching a peak concurrent player count of over 300,000 within its first few days. This performance placed it ahead of major titles like PUBG: Battlegrounds and Grand Theft Auto V, and behind only Counter-Strike 2 and Dota 2. Despite releasing midweek, the game was expected to see a further rise in player numbers over the weekend.

Throne and Liberty's early success was attributed to its free-to-play model, its MMORPG elements that encourage guild-based gameplay, and its appeal to both PvP and PvE players. Set in the new world of Solisium, the game offers large-scale PvP battles, quests, and typical MMORPG features such as crafting and fishing. Its narrative-driven approach, emphasized by developers NCSOFT and publisher Amazon Games, helped distinguish it from other genre titles. Although its peak numbers have yet to match those of other Amazon-published MMORPGs like New World and Lost Ark, the early reviews positioned Throne and Liberty as one of the better games of the genre.

On February 14, 2025, just four months after the game's release in Japan and the West, Throne and Liberty servers were consolidated from 107 down to 25 due to sparse population density.
