= Lineage (series) =

- The Lineage II variation of the series logo
- Genre: MMORPG
- Developers: NC; Netmarble Neo; Snail
- Publishers: NC; Netmarble Games; Tencent Holdings; Snail
- Platforms: Microsoft Windows; Mac OS; iOS; Android; Windows Phone; PlayStation 5; Nintendo Switch
- First release: Lineage; September 3, 1998
- Latest release: Journey of Monarch; December 5, 2024

Lineage (Korean: 리니지) is a medieval fantasy massively multiplayer online role-playing game franchise by the South Korean video game developer NC. It has become highly popular in South Korea with subscriptions counting into the millions, but is also available in Chinese, Japanese, Russian, and English-language versions. It is also one of the highest-grossing video game franchises of all time, having grossed $9.7 billion in lifetime revenue, as of 2019.

== Games ==
Release timeline
1998	Lineage
1999
2000
2001
2002
2003	Lineage II
2004
2005
2006
2007
2008
2009
2010
2011
2012
2013
2014
2015
2016	Lineage Red Knights
2017	Lineage 2: Revolution
2017	Lineage M
2018
2019	Lineage 2M
2020
2021	Lineage W
2022
2023	Throne and Liberty
2024	Journey of Monarch

- Lineage, released in 1998.
  - Lineage M, a mobile port version of Lineage developed by NCSoft, released in South Korea on June 21, 2017.
  - Lineage W, a sequel to Lineage, released in Asian markets in November 2021. The story is set in 150 years after story of Lineage.
  - Journey of Monarch, a spinoff to Lineage, released worldwide in December 2024.
- Lineage II, a prequel to Lineage, released in 2003. The story is set in 150 years before story of Lineage.
  - Lineage 2: Revolution, a direct prequel to Lineage II. The story is set 100 years before the storyline of Lineage II: Goddess of Destruction. Developed by Netmarble Neo, the game was released on mobile platforms in 2017.
  - Lineage 2 M, a mobile port version of Lineage II, released in November 2019.
  - Lineage 2: Blood League, a mobile game developed by Snail Games, release date unannounced.
- Lineage Red Knights, a mobile game developed by NCSoft, released in 2017.
- Throne and Liberty, a direct sequel to Lineage.

== Revenue ==
The following is the gross revenue generated by the Lineage PC games.

Year(s)	NCSoft revenue (PC games) (Note: NCSoft's royalty revenue amount is not listed here prior to 2005, and is excluded after 2008.)				Ref
Year(s)	Lineage	Lineage II	Lineage I & II (₩)	Lineage I & II ($)	Ref
1998–1999	₩6.8 billion	—N/a	₩1,500 billion	$2,081 million	
2000	₩55.9 billion	—N/a	₩1,500 billion	$2,081 million	
2001	₩122.593 billion	—N/a	₩1,500 billion	$2,081 million	
2002	₩154.61 billion	—N/a	₩1,500 billion	$2,081 million	
2003	₩145.8 billion (Note: NCSoft revenue from EverQuest included.)	₩20.737 billion	₩1,500 billion	$2,081 million	
2004	₩137.831 billion	₩109.063 billion	₩1,500 billion	$2,081 million	
2005	₩130.185 billion (Note: Revenue ₩115.012 billion and royalty revenue ₩15.173 billion.)	₩132.092 billion (Note: Revenue ₩118.953 billion and royalty revenue ₩13.139 billion.)	₩1,500 billion	$2,081 million	
2006	₩130.919 billion (Note: Revenue ₩118.049 billion and royalty revenue ₩12.87 billion.)	₩127.413 billion (Note: Revenue ₩119.206 billion and royalty revenue ₩8.207 billion.)	₩258.332 billion	$2,081 million	
2007	₩124.681 billion (Note: Revenue ₩111.401 billion and royalty revenue ₩13.28 billion.)	₩132.724 billion (Note: Revenue ₩131.154 billion and royalty revenue ₩1.57 billion.)	₩257.405 billion	$2,081 million	
2008	₩127.617 billion (Note: Revenue ₩112.602 billion and royalty revenue ₩15.015 billion.)	₩150.047 billion (Note: Revenue ₩147.211 billion and royalty revenue ₩2.836 billion.)	₩277.664 billion	$2,081 million	
2009 (Note: NCSoft has stopped disclosing the breakdown of royalties, hence royalty revenue is excluded after this point.)	₩132.033 billion	₩152.754 billion	₩284.787 billion	$223.02 million	
2010	₩181.189 billion	₩118.207 billion	₩299.396 billion	$537.47 million	
2011	₩195.702 billion	₩100.574 billion	₩296.276 billion	$537.47 million	
2012	₩205.261 billion	₩65.082 billion	₩270.343 billion	$239.99 million	
2013	₩287.887 billion	₩57.131 billion	₩345.018 billion	$315.13 million	
2014	₩263.128 billion	₩59.479 billion	₩322.607 billion	$306.38 million	
2015	₩312.876 billion	₩62.952 billion	₩375.828 billion	$332.25 million	
2016	₩375.487 billion	₩77.114 billion	₩452.601 billion	$390.03 million	
2017	₩154.422 billion	₩65.792 billion	₩220.214 billion	$194.81 million	
2018	₩149.705 billion	₩63.886 billion	₩213.591 billion	$194.09 million	
2019	₩174.07 billion	₩93.588 billion	₩267.658 billion	$229.68 million	
2020	₩176 billion	₩105 billion	₩281 billion	$238.08 million	
2021	₩134.077 billion	₩100 billion	₩234.077 billion	$204.62 million	
1998–2021	₩3,878.773 billion+	₩1,793.635 billion+	₩6,156.797 billion	$5.487 billion	

== See also ==
- List of best-selling video game franchises
