= NC (company) =

South Korea-based video game developer and publisher

NC Corporation
- Native name: 엔씨
- Type: Public
- Traded as: KRX: 036570
- Industry: Video games
- Founded: 11 March 1997; 29 years ago
- Founder: Kim Taek-jin
- Headquarters: Pangyo, Seongnam, South Korea
- Key people: Kim Taek-jin (CEO)
- Products: See complete list of products
- Revenue: ▼ ₩1.507 trillion (2025)
- Operating income: ▲ ₩16.1 billion (2025)
- Net income: ▲ ₩347.4 billion (2025)
- Total assets: ▲ ₩4.333 trillion (2025)
- Total equity: ▲ ₩3.370 trillion (2025)
- Owner: Kim Taek-jin (11.9%); Public Investment Fund (9.26%); Netmarble (8.9%); National Pension Service (8.4%)
- Number of employees: 3100
- Website: nc.com

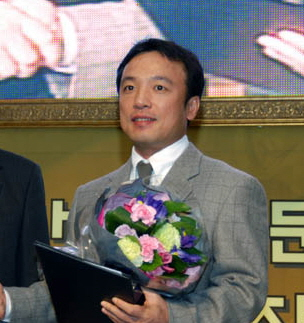
Kim Taek-jin, founder and CEO

NC Corporation (Korean: 엔씨), formerly NCSoft (Korean: 엔씨소프트) is a South Korean video game developer and publisher headquartered in Pangyo, Seongnam, South Korea, primarily known for the distribution of massively multiplayer online role-playing games such as Lineage and Guild Wars.

== History ==
NCSoft was founded in March 1997 by Kim Taek-jin. In September 1998, NCSoft launched its first game Lineage. In April 2001 the company created a US subsidiary under the name NC Interactive (based in Austin, Texas, and later became NCSoft West) after acquiring Destination Games, headed by Richard Garriott and Robert Garriott. In 2004, NCSoft launched two MMORPGs, Lineage II and City of Heroes. In December 2023, NCsoft released the MMPRPG 'Throne and Liberty'.

The company formed NCSoft Europe in July 2004 as a wholly owned subsidiary with its main office in Brighton, England. It brought City of Heroes to several European countries on February 4, 2005, and have since established European service for WildStar and Blade & Soul as well.

On April 26, 2005, NCSoft published Arenanet's first MMO Guild Wars Prophecies as well as Arenanet's follow up campaigns Factions and Nightfall and the expansion Eye of the North. NCSoft also published Guild Wars 2 but stopped being the publisher for Guild Wars 2 in 2015 with the release of Heart of Thorns.

On September 10, 2008, NCSoft announced the formation of NCSoft West, a subsidiary which manages NCSoft's other western organizations, and established its headquarters in Seattle, Washington. On July 28, 2021, NCSoft announced that it was adding the talents of long-time video game industry veteran Jeffrey Anderson (game designer) to its executive leadership team as the new CEO of NCSoft West, overseeing its games business in the Americas, EMEA, and Oceana regions.

On July 8, 2011, NCSoft started talks with SK Telecom to acquire Ntreev Soft Co., Ltd. The talks were expected to last less than a month, but it took seven for NCSoft to complete the acquisition; purchasing 76% of Ntreev's stock for ₩108 billion (US$96.7 million) on February 15, 2012.

In 2011, NCSoft purchased Hotdog Studio, a mobile game studio based in Seoul that produces phone and smartphone titles such as Dark Shrine.

In 2012 Nexon acquired a 14.7 percent interest in NCSoft for $688 million. Nexon sold all of its shares of NCSoft in October 2015.

On November 19, 2015, NCSoft West announced the formation of Iron Tiger studios, a developer based in San Mateo, California focused on adapting Korean-made mobile titles for the West, as well as developing its own mobile games.

On August 21, 2020, NCSoft entered the Korean entertainment industry by launching a new subsidiary called "Klap Co., Ltd." Klap and NCSoft launched the entertainment platform UNIVERSE on January 28, 2021.

In March 2022, the Public Investment Fund of Saudi Arabia acquired a 9.26 percent stake in NCSoft, becoming the company's second largest shareholder after Kim Taek-jin.

In November 2023, NCSoft announced that it had signed a strategic partnership with Sony Interactive Entertainment. On January 18, 2024, NCSoft wound down and laid off all 70 employees of its Ntreev Soft subsidiary. NCsoft received the Chinese government's approval for its online games on October 25, 2024.

On April 2, 2026, the company name was changed to NC.

== Subsidiaries ==
=== Development Studios ===
- ArenaNet
- Iron Tiger Studios
- FirstSpark Games
- BigFire Games
- 77ST. Games

=== Service and R&D ===
- NC AI
- NC QA
- NC AX
- NC ITS
- NC SERVICE

=== Sports & Foundations ===
- NC Dinos
- NC Cultural Foundation
- Laughing Peanut Children's Foundation

=== Former ===
- Carbine Studios
- Destination Games
- Paragon Studios
- KLAP Entertainment
- Ntreev Soft

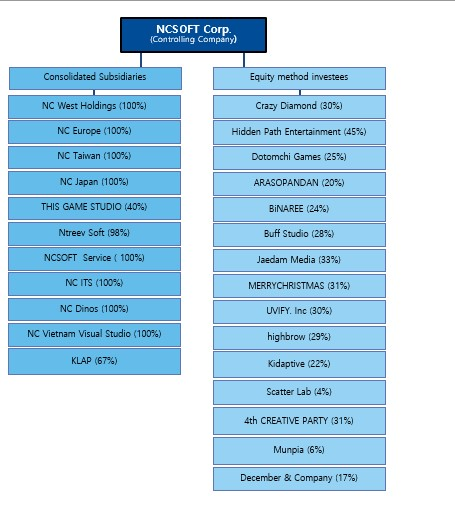
NcSoft structure

== Controversies ==
=== Stolen source code ===
On April 27, 2007, Seoul Metropolitan Police said that seven former employees of NCSoft are suspected of selling the Lineage III source code to a major Japanese game company. According to NCSoft, the potential damages may exceed US$1 billion.

=== Worlds.com patent lawsuit ===
Worlds.com CEO Thom Kidrin claimed the idea of a "scalable virtual world with thousands of users" is patented by his organization and targeted NCSoft for patent infringement in 2008, in what he says will be the first of many lawsuits against MMO developers. On April 23, 2010, the Worlds.com case settled, but the terms of the settlement were kept confidential. On July 22, 2010, Worlds.com requested the case be reopened.

=== Richard Garriott termination ===
Richard Garriott, lead developer of the failed MMORPG Tabula Rasa, sued NCSoft for US$24 million in damages concerning his termination from the company. Garriott asserted in his suit that he was forced out of the company and was made to sell his 400,000 shares in NCSoft's stock, costing him millions of dollars. In addition, he claimed that the company was guilty of fraud by forging his resignation announcement. On July 30, 2010, a jury in a Texas federal court awarded him US$28 million in damages. NCSoft described Garriott as someone "who keeps finding different ways to turn the company into his personal ATM," and that "Garriott left the company voluntarily to catch his ride to the International Space Station." Citing his questionable work ethic and the failure of his video game project despite an $84.4 million investment, NCSoft pulled the plug on the game after which Garriott announced he would be leaving the company. This came after the much-publicized news of his boarding of a Russian aircraft, which cost $30 million. Garriott again prevailed on appeal and NCSoft was required to pay an additional US$4 million, bringing the total damages awarded to Garriott to US$32 million.

=== Closure of Paragon Studios and City of Heroes ===
On August 31, 2012, NCSoft liquidated Paragon Studios and announced the closure of City of Heroes. Over 21,000 players signed an online petition contesting the shut-down and many used social media to promote their criticisms.

=== Major company reconstruction in South Korea ===
In 2024, NCSoft underwent significant restructuring in South Korea to tackle persistent financial challenges and reduce rigid fixed costs. The process began with the closure of its subsidiary, Ntreev Soft, leading to the layoff of 70 employees in January 2024 after enduring an 11-year deficit. Consequently, the development and service of Trickster M, Pro Baseball H2, and Pro Baseball H3 were terminated. Prior to its main branch overhaul, the company also split its software business into two support units in August 2024: NC QA (quality assurance) and NC IDS (application and system software management).

On November 28, 2024, NCSoft's shareholders officially approved the corporate split-off plan to transition into an independent multi-studio system. The four planned specialized units were officially launched as wholly-owned private subsidiaries on February 1, 2025:

- NC AI oversees proprietary AI technologies, including the scale-up of NCSoft's Varco Large Language Model (LLM) to optimize game development workflows (such as character modeling and quest scripting). It is led by Lee Yeon-soo.
- FirstSpark Games inherited the MMORPG Throne and Liberty to manage its live services and focus on expanding the title into a global intellectual property (IP), headed by Moonyoung Choi.
- BigFire Games assumed responsibility for developing the open-world competitive shooter Project LLL (initially referred to during planning as Cinder City), guided by vice president of game development Jaehyun Bae.

In the wake of this restructuring, NCSoft disbanded remaining non-aligned teams and cut non-core projects. This included the cancellation of the ultra-realistic single-player action thriller Project M and the cessation of the newly released game Battle Crush. Alongside these cuts, a major voluntary retirement program was executed, resulting in an approximate 10% reduction in total headcount to streamline the company's bloated payroll.

Following the completion of this painful transition, the company's financial health began to turn around. After booking a significant net loss and absorbing one-time severance costs, NCSoft returned to profitability. This stabilization was accelerated by the massive November 2025 launch of Aion 2 in South Korea, and Taiwan and the February 2026 debut of Lineage Classic in South Korea, pushing PC online game sales to their highest levels since 2017. Moving forward, NCSoft has oriented its long-term strategy around data-driven mobile casual games, global expansion alongside partners like Amazon Games and Sony, and a multi-studio operational model designed to shorten development cycles.

== Games ==
Year	Title	Developer	Genre	Ref.
1998	Lineage	NCSoft (Team L2Live)	MMORPG	
2003	Lineage II	NCSoft	MMORPG	
2004	City of Heroes	Paragon Studios	MMORPG	
2005	Guild Wars	ArenaNet	MMORPG	
2006	Auto Assault	NetDevil	MMORPG	
2007	Dungeon Runners	NCSoft	MMORPG	
2007	Tabula Rasa	Destination Games	MMORPG	
2007	Exteel	NCSoft (E&G Studios)	TPS	
2008	Point Blank	Zepetto	FPS	
2009	Aion	NCSoft (Team Aion)	MMORPG	
2011	Gem Keeper	NCSoft	Tower defense	
2012	Blade & Soul	NCSoft (Team Bloodlust)	MMORPG	
2012	Guild Wars 2	ArenaNet	MMORPG	
2013	Shin Jan Ryu Mon	NCSoft Japan	Mahjong	
2014	WildStar	NCSoft (Carbine)	MMORPG	
2016	Love Beat	CrazyDiamond	Dance/Rhythm	
2016	Lineage Red Knight	NCSoft	RPG	
2017	Final Blade	NCSoft	RPG	
2017	Pro Baseball H2!	NTREEV (Baseball Team)	Sport	
2017	Master X Master	NCSoft (Studio MXM)	MOBA	
2017	Lineage M	NCSoft	MMORPG	
2017	Aion: Legions of War	NCSoft	RPG	
2019	Lineage II M	NCSoft (Team L2Live)	RPG	
2020	FUSER	Harmonix	Rhythm	
2021	Pro Baseball H3!	NTREEV (Baseball Team)	Sport	
2021	Trickster M	NTREEV (Trickster Team)	MMORPG	
2021	Blade & Soul 2	NCSoft (Team Bloodlust)	MMORPG	
2021	Lineage W	Studio W	MMORPG	
2024	Battle Crush	NCSoft	Action, brawler	
2024	Throne and Liberty	FirstSpark Games	MMORPG	
2024	Blade & Soul Heroes	NCSoft	Strategy RPG	
2025	AION 2	NCSoft (Team Aion)	MMORPG	
2027	Guild Wars 3	ArenaNet	MMORPG	
TBA	Cinder City	BigFire Games	MMOTPS	
TBA	Time:Takers	Mistil Games	MMOTPS	
TBA	Limit Zero Breakers	Vic Game Studios; Kadokawa Games	RPG	
TBA	Horizon Steel Frontiers	NC	MMORPG	
TBA	Astrae Oratio	Dynamis One	RPG	

In addition, NCSoft is also the developer and maintainer of a variety of web-based board games in Asian markets.
