= Lineage II =

2003 video game

- Developers: NCSoft; E&G Studios
- Publisher: NCSoft
- Series: Lineage
- Engine: Unreal Engine 2
- Platform: Windows
- Release: KOR: October 1, 2003; NA: April 27, 2004; EU: November 19, 2004
- Genre: Massively multiplayer online role-playing
- Mode: Multiplayer

Lineage II is a massively multiplayer online role-playing game (MMORPG) for Windows and the second game in the Lineage series. It is a prequel to Lineage and is set 150 years before the first game. It has become popular since its October 1, 2003 launch in South Korea, reporting 40,027,918 unique users during the month of March 2007. To date, the game has been played by more than 94 million users from all over the world.

Lineage II adopted a free-to-play model in Lineage II: Goddess of Destruction, with all game content being free except for "purchasable in-game store items and packs" in November 2011. A prequel, Lineage 2: Revolution, was released as a mobile game in 2016.

Lineage 2M was launched for the first time in South Korea in November 2019.

== Gameplay ==
In Lineage II, players create a character, choose the race and personalise the face and hair in style, color, expression, and gender.

Every player begins the game in a temple in their character's race's zone (for example: Humans start in "Talking Island" and the Dark Elves in "The Shilen Temple"). Typically, players can choose between a mage and a fighter in each race except Dwarves and Kamael, which can only be fighters.

=== Battles ===
A major part of Lineage II gameplay is the combat. Monsters can be found outside of Towns on the hunting fields or deep inside underground dungeons. When the player defeats a monster, their character gets XP (experience points) and SP (skill points) to help them level up and learn new skills.

Players can also fight other players through a PvP system.

=== Death ===
If a player's character dies in battle, they are given the option to resurrect in the nearest town or village. They can also wait for another player to resurrect them with a Resurrection scroll or spell. Resurrecting in the nearest town costs a fraction of the XP gained, which grows exponentially with level. Resurrection spells and elite scrolls generally restore some of the lost experience.

== Plot ==
The game follows a fictional history through sets of plots called "Sagas". There are currently four sagas: "The Chaotic Chronicle", "The Chaotic Throne", "Goddess of Destruction", and "Epic Tale of Aden". Large-scale updates/expansions are known as "Chronicles" (also known as "The Throne" in The Chaotic Throne, "Chapter" in Goddess of Destruction, and "Episode" in Epic Tale of Aden), which introduce new story elements as well as new features and add-ons. They are released every six months. Each expansion features new skills, quests, areas, and items. Some expansions also increased the level cap.

== Characters ==
Players select up to seven characters per account. There are currently seven races in the world of Lineage II: the Humans, who are similar to modern-day humans and who have all-around balanced characteristics; the Elves, who have superior dexterity, movement, and casting speed, but weaker offense; Dark Elves, who have higher magic and melee attack capabilities; Orcs, who have higher HP and MP but slower movement; Dwarves, who are powerful melee attackers and master craftsmen; Kamael, who are humanoids with single wings and gender-specific job classes; and Ertheia, female warriors with two completely unique classes, and different quest lines.

== Development ==
Hyeong-Jin Kim, the production team head for Lineage II, came up with the basic concept for the game in early 2000. Development happened in October–November of the same year. Kim and producer James Bae have stated that their reasons for developing a prequel for Lineage rather than a sequel is that "Lineage will continue to be updated as a game", and that they did not want to risk a conflict with the direction of updates that Lineage will take in the future.

According to Kim and Bae, the game's initial subtitle, "The Chaotic Chronicle", was developed with the intention to express the large-scale war, strategies, conflicts, and collaborations that they hoped to encourage among players.

Lead game designer Raoul Kim said that the reason for rendering Lineage II in 3D was "simply because most games today are [also] using 3D graphics", and because they deemed it "more appropriate than 2D for the things that [they] were going to create". Developers chose to use the Unreal Engine 2 game engine because of its ability to render outdoor scenes and its powerful editing features.

According to Game Design team head, Cheol-Woong Hwang, there were different concepts for each of the race's home villages. He described the concept for the human village in Talking Island as "ordinary", while the Elven Village was designed "so as not to lose the natural and royal high-class feeling". They designed the Dark Elven village based on a "grotesque and serious feeling in order to express the rough history of these who had been expelled from the Elves". There are three versions of Lineage II currently available - Classic/Legacy, Aden/Essence and Live/Main.

== Reception ==
Reception

Aggregate scores
Aggregator	Score
GameRankings	65% The Kamael: 57%
Metacritic	62/100

Review scores
Publication	Score
GameSpot	6/10
GameSpy	3/5
IGN	6.7/10

The overall reception for Lineage II is mixed; the game received average review scores from various video game rating websites. Andrew Park of GameSpot said that the game "offers either a repetitive grind or a stiff challenge", and is not suitable for casual gamers who can only play an hour or less per day. Allen "Delsyn" Rausch called the Kamael "an interesting race in that, unlike other Lineage II races, they focus specifically on the warrior path with high-level class paths segregated by gender".

The Chronicle 5: Oath of Blood expansion won the Expansion of the Year award at Stratics Central Editor's Choice Awards 2006, and Lineage II earned an Honorable Mention for the Game of the Year award. During the 9th Annual Interactive Achievement Awards, Lineage II received a nomination for "Massively Multiplayer Game of the Year".

== Sequels ==
Lineage II is one of the MMOs that were subject to ethnographic study in Constance Steinkuehler and Dmitri Williams's article, "Where Everybody Knows Your (Screen) Name: Online Games as 'Third Places'".

=== Lineage 2 M ===
Lineage 2 M is a mobile game that aims to replicate the gameplay of Lineage II but for mobile devices. It was released on November 27, 2019.

=== Prequel ===
A prequel, Lineage 2: Revolution, was released as a mobile game in 2016.

=== Sequel ===
NCsoft officially announced Lineage Eternal as the sequel to the first Lineage in November 2011. The first gameplay videos debuted at the G-Star 2011 gaming convention in South Korea on November 10. NCSoft renamed the game Project TL in 2017 and Throne and Liberty in 2022. It was released in 2023.

== Content patches ==
The Chaotic Chronicles

NA launch date	Korean launch date	Codename	Title
28 April 2004	1 October 2003	C0	Prelude
28 June 2004	28 January 2004	C1	Chronicle 1: Harbingers of War
8 December 2004	11 August 2004	C2	Chronicle 2: Age of Splendor
10 May 2005	2 March 2005	C3	Chronicle 3: Rise of Darkness
8 February 2006	26 October 2005	C4	Chronicle 4: Scions of Destiny
6 September 2006	1 June 2006	C5	Chronicle 5: Oath of Blood

The Chaotic Throne

NA launch Date	Korean launch date	Codename	Title (EN/KR)
11 April 2007	13 December 2006	CT0	Interlude
11 December 2007	16 August 2007	CT1	The Kamael
23 April 2008	12 December 2007	CT1.5	Hellbound / Kamael Plus
12 August 2008	30 April 2008	CT2.1	Gracia Part 1
28 October 2008	13 August 2008	CT2.2	Gracia Part 2
28 April 2009	26 November 2008	CT2.3	Gracia Final
17 November 2009	3 June 2009	CT2.4	Gracia Epilogue / Gracia Plus
24 August 2010	3 February 2010	CT2.5	Freya
	7 July 2010		High Five
	25 August 2010		High Five Part 2
	27 October 2010		High Five Part 3
15 February 2011	15 December 2010	CT2.6	High Five / High Five Part 4
14 March 2011			High Five Part 5

Goddess of Destruction (Free2Play)

NA launch Date	Korean launch date	Codename	Title (EN/KR)
30 November 2011	15 June 2011	GD1	Awakening
7 March 2012	19 October 2011	GD1.5	Harmony
13 June 2012	11 January 2012	GD2	Tauti
24 October 2012	25 March 2012	GD2.5	Glory Days
	8 June 2012		Echo
	31 October 2012		Power of the West Wind
29 May 2013	28 November 2012	GD3	Lindvior / Ruler of the West Wind
	23 February 2013		Episodeon
11 December 2013	21 August 2013	GD3.5	Valiance / Raiders

Epic Tale Of Aden

Korean launch date	NA launch date	EU launch date	Codename	Title (EN/KR)
31 December 2013	30 July 2014	14 October 2014	EP1	Ertheia / Dimensional Strangers
25 June 2014				Infinite Odyssey: Prelude to the Journey
27 August 2014				Infinite Odyssey
10 December 2014	22 April 2015	17 June 2015	EP2	Infinite Odyssey / Infinite Odyssey: Shadows of Light Part 1
14 January 2015				Infinite Odyssey: Shadows of Light Part 2
1 May 2015	14 October 2015		EP2.5	Underground / Infinite Odyssey: Hymn of the Soul
17 June 2015				Infinite Odyssey: Will of the Ancients
9 September 2015	29 June 2016	2 August 2016	EP3	Helios
18 May 2016				Grand Crusade
31 August 2016	29 March 2017	25 April 2017	EP4	Grand Crusade / Grand Crusade: Force Bringer
8 February 2017	7 December 2017	6 December 2017	EP5	Salvation: First Chapter (NA) / The Page: Salvation
12 April 2017				Salvation: The Gathering
29 November 2017	22 August 2018	8 August 2018		Salvation - Etina's Fate (NA) / Orfen (KR)
30 July 2018	15 May 2019	22 February 2019	EP5.5	Fafurion
12 December 2018	31 Jule 2019	2 August 2019		Prologue (KR) Fafurion Pt.1 (NA) / Prelude of War (EU)
	30 October 2019	27 September 2019		Fafurion Pt.2 (NA) / Prelude of War Pt.2 (EU)
	15 January 2020	25 December 2019		Winter of War (NA) / Prelude of War Pt.3 (EU)
	1 April 2020	22 April 2020		Dawn of Heroes (NA) / Homunculus (EU)
	19 August 2020	15 August 2020		Tales Untold (NA) / Homunculus Ch.2 (EU)
	3 February 2021	3 March 2021		Wild Horizons (NA) / Return of the Queen Ant (EU)
	16 June 2021	30 June 2021		Herald of Light (NA) / The Return of the Queen Ant Ch. 2 (EU)

Deathknight

Korean launch date	NA launch date	EU launch date	Codename	Title
26 May 2021	19 October 2021	3 November 2021	D1.0	Master Class
	3 March 2022	10 March 2022		Storm of Terror (NA) / Master Class Ch. 2 (EU)
	14 October 2022	26 October 2022		Hero's Tome (NA) / Master Class Ch. 3 (EU)
	15 March 2023	29 March 2023		Dethrone Fire (NA) / The Source of Flame (EU)
23 May 2023	13 November 2023			Shinemaker (NA) / Shine Maker (KR)
-	7 August 2024			(NA) / Rising Knight
