= Lineage (video game) =

1998 massively-multiplayer online role-playing video game

- Developer: NCSoft
- Publisher: NCSoft
- Designer: Jake Song
- Composer: Joey Newman
- Series: Lineage
- Platforms: Windows, Mac OS X
- Release: Windows; September 3, 1998; Mac OS X; April 11, 2002
- Genre: Massively multiplayer online role-playing
- Mode: Multiplayer

Lineage (Korean: 리니지), also known as Lineage: The Blood Pledge in Western markets, is a medieval fantasy, massively multiplayer online role-playing game (MMORPG) released in Korea and the United States in 1998 by the South Korean computer game developer NCSoft, based on a Korean comic book series of the same name. It is the first game in the Lineage series. It is most popular in Korea and is available in Chinese, Japanese, and English. The game was designed by Jake Song, who had previously designed Nexus: The Kingdom of the Winds, another MMORPG.

Lineage features 2D isometric-overhead graphics similar to those of Ultima Online and Diablo II. Lineage II: The Chaotic Chronicle, a "prequel" set 150 years before the time of Lineage, was released in 2003. By 2006, the Lineage franchise had attracted 43 million players. Lineage W and Throne and Liberty are sequels set after Lineage and will be the last two games in the Lineage series.

== Gameplay ==
Lineage's stat, monster, and item system was originally largely borrowed from NetHack with MMO elements added.

Players can choose one of seven character classes: Elf, Dark Elf, Knight, Prince, Magician, Dragon Knight, or Illusionist. Princes are the only class that can lead a blood pledge (which is Lineage's term for a guild or clan).

Gameplay is based primarily upon a castle siege system which allows castle owners to set tax rates in neighboring cities and collect taxes on items purchased in stores within those cities. It features classic RPG elements reminiscent of Dungeons & Dragons, such as killing monsters and completing quests for loot and experience points, levels, character attributes (charisma, strength, wisdom, etc.), and alignments (neutral, chaotic or lawful). A character's alignment affects how monsters and town guards react to the player's character, often turning hostile to chaotic players and attacking on sight.

Player versus player combat (also known as PVP) is extensive in Lineage. Players can engage in combat with other player characters at any time as long as they are not in safe zones such as cities. By joining a "bloodpledge" (an association of players similar to a clan in other games) players become eligible to engage in castle sieges or wars between bloodpledges.

== Development and release ==
The title Lineage came from a series of comic books with the same title Lineage by Shin Il-sook, and the servers of Lineage are named after the characters of the comic book. It is a fantasy story where a rightful prince reclaims the throne from the hands of a usurper. When first created, the game closely resembled the original work. As developers have added new features, however, the fictional universes of the two works have gradually diverged.

Lineage was launched in South Korea in 1998. The North American servers were shut down on June 29, 2011 by NCSoft.

== Reception ==
Reception

Aggregate scores
Aggregator	Score
GameRankings	65%
Metacritic	59/100

NCSoft reported that Lineage had at one point more than three million subscribers, most of them in Korea. The magnitude of the number Korean subscribers compared to other countries has sparked a number of theories. A ban on some Japanese imports until 1998 has been cited for delayed growth in its video game console market.

As of April 2008, Lineage had a little under 1 million active subscriptions.

In 2011, NC Interactive, the subsidiary of NCSoft in the United States began to shut down the Lineage servers (3 at that time) because of poor subscription revenues. Various events were scheduled to take place in the weeks remaining. Players were given free subscriptions to other NCSoft titles of their choice. As of June 2011, Lineage has shut down all servers in NA, permanently.

Between the start in 1998 and August 2012, NCSoft had accumulated $1.3 billion in sales revenue from Lineage. By November 2013, the game made $1.8 billion.

== Sequels ==
=== Lineage M ===
Lineage M is a mobile port of Lineage developed by NCSoft. It was released in South Korea on June 21, 2017. By June 2018, the game had generated over $1.2 billion in gross revenue. As of July 2020, it had grossed $2.8 billion.

The game attracted controversy in early 2021. The game issued a major balance patch in January that offered improved rates for attaining certain in-game abilities and items, but then did a rollback four days later. There were disputes over how refunds were issued; NCSoft did not return real-money purchases made during the four days of the patch, but rather refunded spent in-game currency instead. This essentially forced players - who may have bought in-game currency expecting the higher rates from the new patch - to keep the purchase at the lower rates of the old patch. One player was sued by NCSoft after they spent 160 million Korean won (approximately US$141,000 at 2021 exchange rate) during the period the new patch was live then angrily protested the rollback by obstructing the NCSoft office parking lot with their car.

=== Lineage W ===
Lineage W is a massively multiplayer online role-playing game (MMORPG) developed and published by NCSoft. It is a fifth major installment of the Lineage series by using all elements from Lineage game and sharing some elements with the Lineage II title. The game was announced in August 2021.

=== Lineage Classic ===
NC Soft reopened a service based on the early-version content and systems of the original 리니지, which was first released in 1998. It recreated the rules, difficulty level, and progression structure from before later updates, emphasizing a competitive player-versus-player environment and a high level of difficulty in hunting and item acquisition. The service is operated through separate servers or seasonal formats distinct from the live servers, targeting players who prefer the original game's atmosphere and mechanics.
