= Golden Goblet Award for Best Animation Film =

Chinese film award

The Golden Goblet Award for Best Animation Film (Chinese: 金爵奖最佳动画片) is a highest prize awarded to films in the animation category of competition at the Shanghai International Film Festival.

== Award winners ==
Year	Film	Country
2015	Song of the Sea	(Republic of Ireland) / (Belgium) / (Denmark) / (France) / (Luxembourg) Tomm Moore
2016	Ted Sieger's Molly Monster	(Germany) / (Sweden) / (Switzerland) Ted Sieger/Michael Ekblad/Matthias Bruhn
2017	Loving Vincent	(United Kingdom) Hugh Welchman/Dorota Kobiela
2018	Maquia: When the Promised Flower Blooms	(Japan) Mari Okada
2019	Ride Your Wave	(Japan) Masaaki Yuasa
2021	Even Mice Belong in Heaven	(Czech Republic) Jan Bubenicek, Denisa Grimmová
2023	Four Souls of Coyote	(Hungary) Áron Gauder
2024	The Colors Within	(Japan) Naoko Yamada
2025	The Songbirds' Secret	(France) / (Switzerland) / (Belgium) Antoine Lanciaux

== See also ==
- Academy Award for Best Animated Feature
- Annecy International Animation Festival
