= Fred Tatasciore =

American voice actor (born 1967 or 1968)

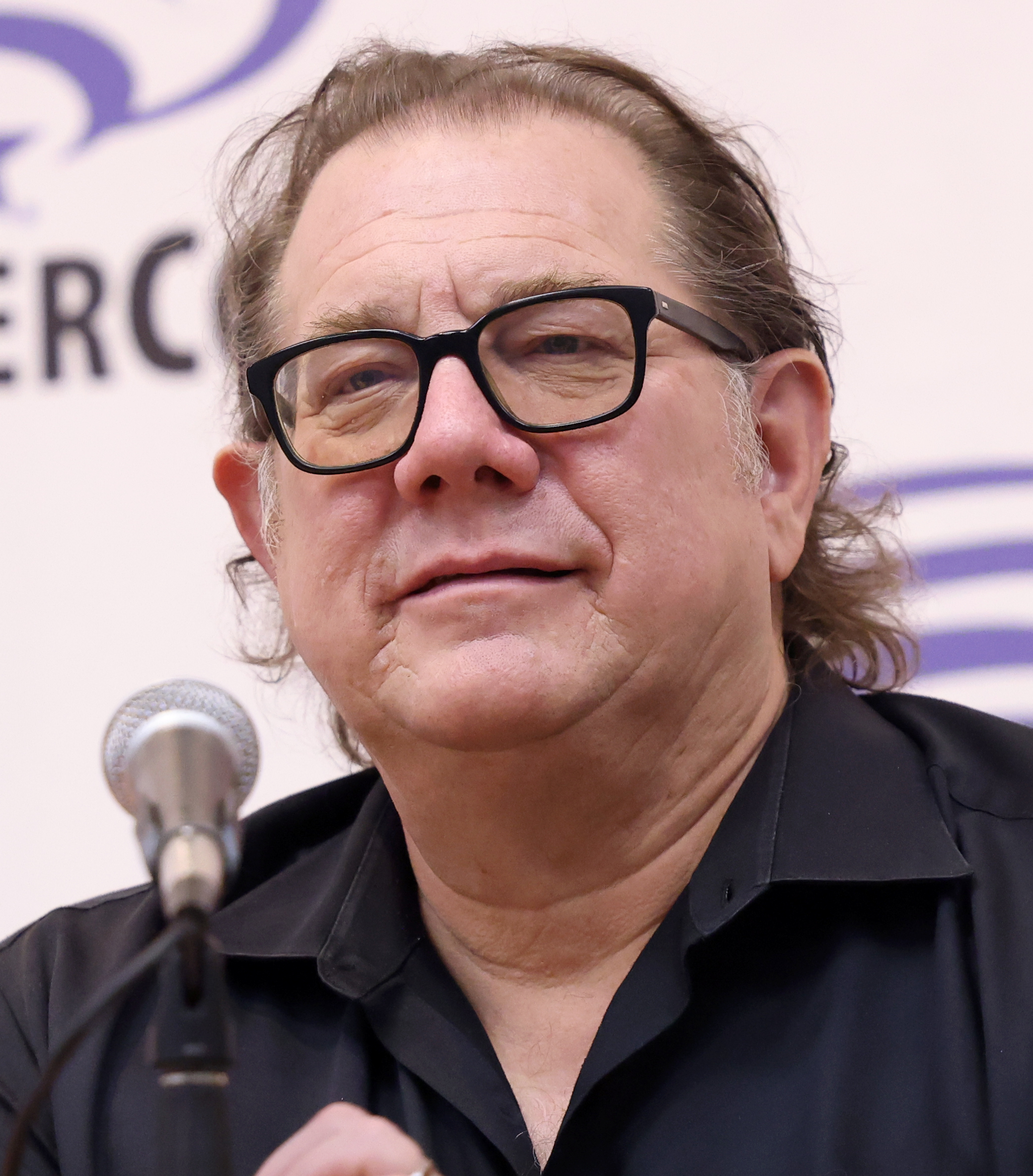
- Tatasciore at the 2025 WonderCon
- Born: June 15, 1967 (age 59) or June 15, 1968 (age 58); New York City, U.S.
- Occupation: Voice actor
- Years active: 1990s–present
- Spouse: Mercedes Younger (m. 2016)
- Children: 2

Fred Tatasciore (/ˈtætəʃɔːr/ TAT-ə-shor, Italian: [tataʃˈʃoːre]; born June 15, 1967 or 1968) is an American voice actor who has provided voices in animated and live-action films, television shows, and video games. He is known for voicing the Hulk, Volstagg, and Beast in various Marvel media and Solomon Grundy and Bane in various DC media. Other characters he has voiced include Yosemite Sam, Taz, Michigan J. Frog, Soldier: 76, Shao Kahn, Dingodile and Kakuzu. From 2021 to 2024, he starred as the title character in the adult animated series Hit-Monkey.

== Life and career ==
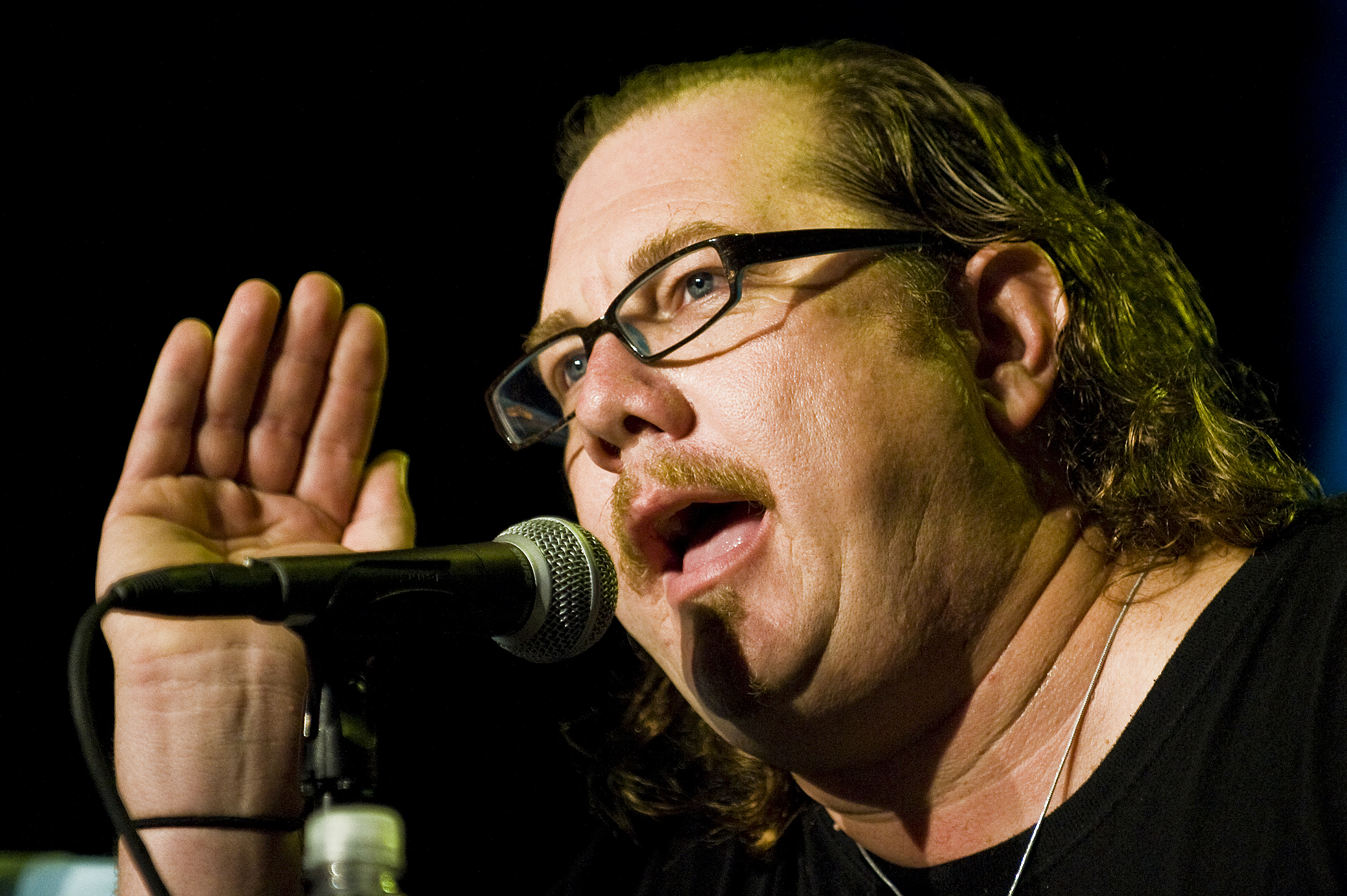
Tatasciore in 2009

Fred Tatasciore was born to Fred Sr and Marianne Ryan Tatasciore. As a child, Tatasciore would use his father's recorder to record voice impressions from radio and television. He then did stand up comedy as well as improv under The Groundlings. Tatasciore studied theatre arts including Shakespearean drama the University of California, Los Angeles. He also joined several comedy bands. He then became an animator.

Tatasciore is best known for portraying characters with deep and powerful voices, though he expanded his range later on. He has voiced the Hulk in multiple Marvel projects, including Marvel: Ultimate Alliance 2, The Avengers: Earth's Mightiest Heroes and Avengers Assemble.

Tatasciore's video game roles include Damon Baird in the Gears of War series, Saren Arterius in the Mass Effect series, Zeratul in StarCraft II and Heroes of the Storm, Soldier: 76 in Blizzard's first-person shooter Overwatch and Xür in Bungie's first-person shooter Destiny. He also voiced the male Orc race in the 2004 MMORPG Lineage 2 as well as other miscellaneous orc NPCs.

He voiced the character "8" in the Tim Burton-produced film 9. He has also voiced Neftin Prog in Ratchet & Clank: Into the Nexus, Nikolai Belinski in the Call of Duty franchise, Megatron in Transformers: War for Cybertron, Fall of Cybertron, Dark of the Moon, and Rise of the Dark Spark, Tookit in ThunderCats, and the Business Cat in the Cartoon Hangover web series Our New Electrical Morals administered by Frederator Studios.

In the Skylanders franchise, he voices Snap Shot, Slam Bam, Warnado, Strykore, Zook and Cuckoo Clocker.

He voiced the main role of Bajoran tactical officer Shaxs on Star Trek: Lower Decks.

As of March 2, 2017, Tatasciore holds the Guinness World Record for the most voice acting performances in superhero video games, with 53 credits as of that date.

== Personal life ==
Tatasciore is married to production designer Mercedes Younger, whom he met studying at UCLA. They have two children.

== Filmography ==
=== Animation ===
List of voice performances in animation
Year	Title	Role	Notes	Ref.
1999–present	Family Guy	Additional voices		
2001	Constant Payne	Welton Payne-Smythe, Skyjacker #2		
2001–2004	Invader Zim	Lard-Nar, various voices		
2003–2005	What's New, Scooby-Doo?	Toxic Terror, Cat Creature, Clyde, Skeleton Driver		
2004	Harvey Birdman, Attorney at Law	Nikos, Lawyer	Episode: "Gone Efficien...t"	
2004	¡Mucha Lucha!	Rudo Claws, Santo Claus, MC Goatlover	Episode: "A Mucha Lucha Christmas"	
2005	Star Wars: Clone Wars	Qui-Gon Jinn, Oppo Rancisis	Episode: "Chapter 21"	
2005	The Grim Adventures of Billy & Mandy	Tom Smith	Episode: "The House of No Tomorrow"	
2005	The Buzz on Maggie	Little Boy, additional voices		
2005–2008	Ben 10	Ripjaws, Cannonbolt, Way Big, Ben 10,000, various voices		
2005–present	American Dad!	Additional voices		
2005–present	Robot Chicken	Garfield, Jon Arbuckle, William Shatner, James T. Kirk, Mr. T, B. A. Baracus, Sean Connery, Lex Luger, Tray-Norr, Spock, Christopher Walken, Leonard McCoy, Scotty, others		
2006	The Emperor's New School	Pacha	Season 1	
2006	Avatar: The Last Airbender	Yung	Episode: "Return to Omashu"	
2007	Class of 3000	The Beast	Episode: "Tamika and the Beast"	
2007	The Replacements	Venzor the Aliynoc		
2007	Tim and Eric Awesome Show, Great Job!	Hacky Sack Extreme Announcer		
2007–2011	Back at the Barnyard	Farmer, various voices		
2008	Camp Lazlo	Bear		
2008	Making Fiends	Toupee Fiend		
2008–2009	Wolverine and the X-Men	Beast, Hulk, Blockbuster, Juggernaut, Harpoon		
2008–2010	The Secret Saturdays	Zon, Komodo, Munya, various voices		
2009	Random! Cartoons	Mr. Papier	Episode: "Victor"	
2009	Chowder	Florentine, Pretzelface, Beardo, Norm, Tooth King		
2009	Uncharted: Eye of Indra	Daniel Pinkerton		
2009	The Marvelous Misadventures of Flapjack	Additional voices		
2009–2011	The Cleveland Show	Vinnie, 8-bit Dustin Hoffman, Bill Cosby		
2009–2013	Phineas and Ferb	Hulk, additional voices		
2010	Pound Puppies	Additional Voices		
2010	Hot Wheels Battle Force 5	Claw'Rok		
2010	Adventure Time	Mannish Man	Episode: "The Enchiridion!"	
2010	Sym-Bionic Titan	Realtor, Beast Soldier, Rebel #1	Episode: "Neighbors in Disguise"	
2010	Fish Hooks	Worker, Cabbie	Episode: "Bea Becomes an Adult Fish"	
2010–2011	Ben 10: Ultimate Alien	Hammer, Quince, Strabismus, Robot Guard		
2010–2011	Generator Rex	NoFace, Providence Tech		
2010–2011	Batman: The Brave and the Bold	Mutant Master, Arsenal, Sgt. Rock, Major Force		
2010–2012	LEGO Hero Factory	Thunder, Drilldozer, Witch Doctor (Aldous Witch)		
2010–2012	The Avengers: Earth's Mightiest Heroes	Hulk, Thing, Yon-Rogg, Volstagg, Graviton, Mandrill, Fenris Wolf, Hoarfen, Red Hulk, Griffin, various voices		
2010–2012	The Penguins of Madagascar	Gus, additional voices		
2010–2013	Planet Sheen	Emperor, additional voices		
2010–2013	Scooby-Doo! Mystery Incorporated	Gluten Demon, A.J. Schwartz, Fright Hound, Phantom		
2010–2013	Mad	J. J. Abrams, Nick Fury, Slimer, Optimus Prime, Woody, Hägar the Horrible, Donkey Kong, Bowser, Hellboy, Santa Claus, Fred Flintstone, George Washington, Darth Vader, others		
2011	Star Wars: The Clone Wars	Roos Tarpals	Episode: "Shadow Warriors"	
2011–2012	Dan Vs.	Hippie Captain, additional voices		
2011–2016	Kung Fu Panda: Legends of Awesomeness	Master Shifu, Gahri, various voices		
2012	Thundercats	Dobo, Tookit		
2012	Scooby-Doo! Haunted Holidays	Santa Claus, Sinister Snowman		
2012	Tron: Uprising	Kevin Flynn / CLU		
2012	Robot and Monster	Punch Morly, additional voices		
2012	Motorcity	Antonio, Gang Member	Episode: "Julie and the Amazons"	
2012–2013	The Garfield Show	Additional Voices		
2012–2013	Randy Cunningham: 9th Grade Ninja	Sundown		
2012–2015	Gravity Falls	Pituitor, Shapeshifter, others		
2012–2015	Regular Show	Muscle Dad, White Elephant, additional voices		
2012–2017	Ultimate Spider-Man	Hulk, Crossbones, Black Bolt, Karnak, Carnage, Joe Fixit, additional voices		
2013	Young Justice	Deathstroke, Ubu, Metamorpho		
2013	Sanjay and Craig	Barfy, additional voices		
2013	TripTank	Various voices		
2013–2014	Monsters vs. Aliens	Vornicarn, additional voices		
2013–2014	Mickey Mouse	Additional voices		
2013–2015	Hulk and the Agents of S.M.A.S.H.	Hulk, Thunderball, Volstagg, Karnak, Hiroim, Xemnu, Wrecker (season 2), Maestro, Ghost Rider, Charon, additional voices		
2013–2016	Wander Over Yonder	Lord Dominator (Disguised Form), Captain Tim, King Draykor, Destructor, additional voices		
2013–2017	Teenage Mutant Ninja Turtles	Ivan Steranko / Rocksteady, Fungus Humongous, additional voices		
2013–2019	Avengers Assemble	Hulk, Volstagg, Crossbones, Space Phantom, Thunderball, Ringmaster, Crimson Dynamo, Ultron, Black Bolt, Guardsman, additional voices		
2014	Mixels	Major Nixel (season 1), Slumbo, Jawg, Nixels		
2014	Turbo Fast	Orangutan	Episode: "The Escargot Affair"	
2014	BoJack Horseman	Additional voices		
2014	We Wish You a Merry Walrus	Captain Rockhopper		
2014–2016	Breadwinners	Bread Maker, additional voices		
2014–2017	Penn Zero: Part-Time Hero	Additional voices		
2014–2015, 2019–2023	Bubble Guppies	Mr. Grouper	Main role (seasons 3, 5, and 6)	
2015	Harvey Beaks	Monster		
2015	Fresh Beat Band of Spies	Additional voices		
2015	Club Penguin: Monster Beach Party	Captain Rockhopper		
2015	The Mr. Peabody & Sherman Show	Winston Churchill, Zeus, others		
2015	Vixen	Additional voices		
2015	Club Penguin: Halloween Panic!	Blooky		
2015	Lego Marvel Super Heroes: Avengers Reassembled	Hulk	Television special	
2015	Marvel Super Hero Adventures: Frost Fight!	Hulk, Ymir	Television special	
2015	Sofia the First	Stable Master	Episode: "The Secret Library"	
2015–2016	Pig Goat Banana Cricket	Additional voices		
2015–2016	Be Cool, Scooby-Doo!	Yeti, Mr. Howard, Scarecrow, others		
2015–2018	DC Super Hero Girls	Solomon Grundy, Killer Croc, Kryptomites		
2015–2019	Star vs. the Forces of Evil	Buff Frog		
2015–2020	New Looney Tunes	Yosemite Sam (seasons 2–3), Carl the Grim Rabbit (2nd voice)		
2016	Star Wars Rebels	Boss Yushyn, Mining Guild Guard	Episode: "The Call"	
2016	Transformers: Robots in Disguise	Saberhorn, Night Watchman, Decepticon Guard		
2016	The Powerpuff Girls	Chef Schnitzel	Episode: "Power-Up Puff"	
2016	Lego Star Wars: The Freemaker Adventures	BL-0X, Super Battle Droid #1	Episode: "The Maker of Zoh"	
2016	Lego Jurassic World: The Indominus Escape	Hoskins		
2016–2018	Skylanders Academy	Snap Shot, Strykore, Arkeyan Robots		
2016–2018	Trollhunters: Tales of Arcadia	AAARRRGGHH!!!, additional voices		
2016–2019	Ask the StoryBots	Bang, Incus, Ned		
2016–2021	Ben 10	Hydromanders, Goblins, Geezer Bob, Fulmini #4, High Override		
2016–present	The Loud House	Bernie, Sergei, T-Bone, additional voices	Recurring role	
2017	Justice League Action	Solomon Grundy, Brainiac's Robots	3 episodes	
2017	Ant-Man	Whirlwind		
2017	Shimmer and Shine	Wishy Washy Genie	Episode: "Wishy Washy Genie"	
2017	Jeff & Some Aliens	Various voices		
2017	Rapunzel's Tangled Adventure	Villager	Episode: "What the Hair?!"	
2017	Billy Dilley's Super-Duper Subterranean Summer	Additional voices		
2017–2018	Lost in Oz	General Guph, Jo, Velvet Rope, Triplet #3, Green Trooper Nome, Utensian Spoon Man		
2017–2019	DuckTales	Bombie the Zombie, additional voices		
2017–2019	Guardians of the Galaxy	Hulk, Max Modell, additional voices		
2017–2020	Spider-Man	Max Modell, Hulk, Crossbones, Beetle		
2017–2021	Castlevania	Various voices		
2018	Supernatural	Phantasm, Beauregard Sanders	Episode: "Scoobynatural"	
2018	Bunnicula	Count Orlock	Episode: "Orlockdown"	
2018	The Adventures of Kid Danger	Various voices		
2018	Trolls: The Beat Goes On!	Hank Montana	Episode: "DJ's Got Talent"	
2018	Fancy Nancy	Santa Claus	Episode: "Nancy and the Nice List"	
2018	Little Big Awesome	Various voices		
2018	Lego Star Wars: All-Stars	Ka-Pao, Mechanic, Pilot, Stormtrooper Sergeant		
2018–2019	3Below: Tales of Arcadia	AAARRRGGHH!!!, Senior Uhl, Neb, Magmatron		
2018–2020	Big Hero 6: The Series	Orso Knox, additional voices		
2018–2020	Rise of the Teenage Mutant Ninja Turtles	Garm, Freki, Repo Mantis, Gus, Various voices		
2018–2020	Star Wars Resistance	Various voices		
2019–2021	Love, Death & Robots	Various voices		
2019–2021	DC Super Hero Girls	Commissioner Gordon, Mr. Chapin, various voices		
2019–2021	Scooby-Doo and Guess Who?	Various voices		
2019–2021	Green Eggs and Ham	Various voices		
2019–2021	Fast & Furious Spy Racers	Various voices		
2019	Pinky Malinky	Jim	2 episodes	
2019	SpongeBob SquarePants	Singing Tennessee Ernie Flounder	Episode: "The Ballad of Filthy Muck"	
2019	The Epic Tales of Captain Underpants	Furculees, Chief Hairococha		
2019	Costume Quest	Norm, additional voices		
2019	Amphibia	Soggy Joe	Recurring role	
2019	Victor and Valentino	Chupacabra		
2019	The Casagrandes	Ninja	Episode: "Walk Don't Run"	
2019	Carmen Sandiego	Sterling Sterling	Episode: "The Need for Speed Caper"	
2020	Archibald's Next Big Thing	Crackerfoot	Episode: "The Legend of Crackerfoot"	
2020	Wizards: Tales of Arcadia	AAARRRGGHH!!!		
2020	Bless the Harts	Henri Tomber	Episode: "Mega Lo Memories: Part Deux"	
2020–2023	Looney Tunes Cartoons	Yosemite Sam, Gossamer, Sam Sheepdog, Taz, Narrator, Mugsy, various voices	Main role	
2020–2023	Animaniacs	Various voices	11 episodes	
2020–2024	Star Trek: Lower Decks	Lieutenant Shaxs, additional voices	Main role	
2020–2025	Blood of Zeus	Hades, Aratus Theogonis, Sinis	16 episodes	
2020–present	Teen Titans Go!	Baby Ear, Hafo, Safo, Frog King, Detective Chimp, Alfred Pennyworth, Clayface, Monsieur Mallah		
2021	Devil May Care	President McKinley		
2021	The Owl House	Malphas	Episode: "Through the Looking Glass Ruins"	
2021	Arcane	Benzo, Master Crafter		
2021–2022	Kid Cosmic	Tuna Sandwich, Hamburg, Death Dog, Gortho, Meep		
2021–2022	Dota: Dragon's Blood	Ulderak, additional voices		
2021–2022	He-Man and the Masters of the Universe	King Randor, Baddrah		
2021–2025	Baby Shark's Big Show!	Slobber Slug		
2021–present	Invincible	Killcannon, Adam Wilkins, Additional voices		
2021–2024	Hit-Monkey	Hit-Monkey	Lead role	
2021–2024	What If...?	Drax, Corvus Glaive, Volstagg, Groot, additional voices	15 episodes	
2021–2024	The Ghost and Molly McGee	Cornelius Brunson, Hidalgo, Bailiff Ghost		
2022–2023	Pretzel and the Puppies	Gus	2 episodes	
2022–2023	Eureka!	Murphy		
2022	Primal	Viking Chieftain, Eldar, Mad-Man, Giroud, Warrior, Villager, Moleman #1	Recurring role	
2022	The Boys Presents: Diabolical	Superbrain, Vought Sniper, Gorilla	Episode: "Laser Baby's Day Out"	
2022–2025	Bugs Bunny Builders	Taz, Gossamer, K-9	Recurring role	
2023–2025	Moon Girl and Devil Dinosaur	Devil Dinosaur, Coach Hrbek, Devos the Devastator, Moon Dinosaur	Main role	
2023–2025	Tiny Toons Looniversity	Taz, Yosemite Sam, Michigan J. Frog, Cool Cat, various voices		
2023–2024	Royal Crackers	Al	Recurring role	
2023–present	The Legend of Vox Machina	Korrin	3 episodes	
2024	Lego Monkie Kid	Li Jing, White Tiger, 100-Eyed Demon	6 episodes	
2024	Tales of the Teenage Mutant Ninja Turtles	Splinter, additional voices		
2024	Invincible Fight Girl	Pampa, Tony	4 episodes	
2024	Spidey and His Amazing Friends	Devil Dinosaur	Episode: "Moon Girl and the Dino Dilemma"	
2024	Secret Level	Arena Announcer, Helldiver	2 episodes	
2024–2025	Hot Wheels Let's Race	Uncle Larry, Mega-Wrex	5 episodes	
2025	StuGo	Nils Vulfren, additional voices		
2025	Iron Man and His Awesome Friends	Gamma		
2025	Bat-Fam	Giganta, Solomon Grundy		
2026	Cow Squad	Surefoot, Cottonpuff	2 episodes	
2026	Golden Axe	Dammed Hellstrike		

=== Anime ===
List of English dubbing performances in anime
Year	Title	Role	Notes	Ref.
2005–2006	Naruto	Gato		
2006	Zatch Bell!	Dalmos, Demolt		
2007	Afro Samurai	Juzo, Patron #5, Shuzo		
2011	Marvel Anime: Wolverine	Shingen Yashida		
2011–2012	Marvel Anime: X-Men	Beast		
2011–2015	Naruto: Shippuden	Kakuzu, Third Raikage (1st voice)		
2017–2018	Marvel Future Avengers	Hulk, Crossbones, Odin, Red Guardian, Black Bolt		
2019	Ultraman	Shin Hayata	2019 ONA	
2020	Great Pretender	Eddie Cassano	Netflix dub Episode: Los Angeles Connection (#1-#5)	
2023	Pluto	Pluto		
2024	Terminator Zero	Detective Fujino	Episode: "Model 101"	
2024	Ranma ½	Genma Saotome	2024 remake	
2024-present	The Elusive Samurai	Shōkan / Hirano Shōgen (平野 将監)		
2026	Cyberpunk: Edgerunners II	Hayakawa	Episode: Then Everyone Went Home	

=== Feature films ===
List of voice and English dubbing performances in feature films
Year	Title	Role	Notes	Ref.
2004	Team America: World Police	Samuel L. Jackson		
2006	Curious George	Additional voices		
2006	The Wild	Additional voices		
2006	The Ant Bully	Ant Council Members		
2006	Barnyard	Farmer		
2006	Charlotte's Web	Sheep #3		
2007	Dead Silence	Clown Doll		
2007	TMNT	General Gato		
2007	Meet the Robinsons	Additional voices		
2007	Beowulf	Additional voices		
2007	Enchanted	Troll		
2008	Madagascar: Escape 2 Africa	Teetsi, Poacher #1, Elephant		
2008	The Spiderwick Chronicles	Goblins		
2009	The Princess and the Frog	Additional voices		
2009	Curious George 2: Follow That Monkey!	Mr. Bloomsberry		
2009	9	8, Radio Announcer		
2010	Alpha and Omega	Garn		
2010	Tangled	Additional voices		
2011	Kung Fu Panda 2	Li Shan, Gorilla Guard #2		
2012	Wreck-It Ralph	Additional voices		
2013	Jack the Giant Slayer	ADR Loop Group		
2013	Star Trek Into Darkness	Additional voices		
2013	Planes	Additional voices		
2013	Frozen	Additional voices		
2014	Planes: Fire & Rescue	Additional voices		
2014	The Boxtrolls	Clocks, Specs		
2015	The Laws of the Universe Part 0	Marui	English dub; Limited theatrical release	
2015	Hotel Transylvania 2	Additional voices		
2015	Star Wars: The Force Awakens	Additional voices		
2015	Zombeavers	Zombeavers		
2015	Yellowbird	Pigeon		
2015	The Prophet	Orange Seller, Bride's Father, Drummer		
2016	Kung Fu Panda 3	Master Bear		
2016	Rescue Dogs	Hammy		
2016	The Huntsman: Winter's War	Mirror Man		
2016	The Angry Birds Movie	Monty Pig		
2016	Bilal: A New Breed of Hero	The Lord of Merchants, Charlatan Priest		
2016	DC Super Hero Girls: Super Hero High	Perry the Parademon		
2016	Batman: The Killing Joke	Carny Owner		
2017	Power Rangers	Goldar, Putties		
2017	The Nut Job 2: Nutty by Nature	Animal Control Guy #2		
2017	The Star	Melchior, Innkeeper #1, Pottery Vendor		
2017	Resident Evil: Vendetta	Diego Gomez		
2017	Annabelle: Creation	Demon		
2018	Gnome Alone	Troggs		
2018	Hotel Transylvania 3: Summer Vacation	Additional voices		
2018	Teen Titans Go! To the Movies	Jor-El, Security Guard		
2018	Next Gen	Announcer, Police Robots, Robot Podium		
2019	The Secret Life of Pets 2	Additional voices		
2019	Frozen II	Additional voices		
2020	Scoob!	Cerberus		
2021	Arlo the Alligator Boy	Jeromio, The Beast, Muscly Farmer, Barn Folk, Doorman		
2021	Space Jam: A New Legacy	Taz		
2021	Rumble	Stoker Referee		
2021	Poupelle of Chimney Town	Toppo	English dub	
2022	Luck	Quinn, Fred		
2022	Hotel Transylvania: Transformania	Additional voices		
2023	Trolls Band Together	Vacationer		
2023	Four Souls of Coyote	Bear, Captain, Lawyer, Antelope, Opossum	Hungarian film	
2025	The Day the Earth Blew Up: A Looney Tunes Movie	Farmer Jim, Scientist		
2025	The King of Kings	Pharisee Eleazar		

=== Direct-to-video and television films ===
List of voice and English dubbing performances in direct-to-video and television films
Year	Title	Role	Notes	Ref.
1999	American Civ. -1	Grandpa		
1999	Foolish	Sammy Davis		
2000	Fist of Legend	Additional voices	DVD English dub	
2000	The Enforcer	Additional voices	DVD English dub	
2000	Project A	Additional voices	DVD English dub	
2000	The Bodyguard from Beijing	Additional voices	DVD English dub	
2000	The Legend	Additional voices	DVD English dub	
2001	High Risk	Kong	DVD English dub	
2002	The Heroic Trio	Kau	DVD English dub	
2002	Iron Monkey 2	Additional voices	DVD English dub	
2002	The Legend II	Additional voices	DVD English dub	
2002	Swordsman II	Additional voices		
2002	Backstage with Little Lorenzo	Little Lorenzo		
2003	Little Lorenzo Gets Rescued	Little Lorenzo		
2003	Heavy	Additional voices		
2004	Dragon Lord	Additional voices	DVD English dub	
2004	Born to Defence	Additional voices	DVD English dub	
2005	Whole	Additional voices		
2005	Stewie Griffin: The Untold Story	Additional voices		
2006	Superman: Brainiac Attacks	Additional voices		
2006	Ultimate Avengers	Hulk, Edwin Jarvis		
2006	Ultimate Avengers 2: Rise of the Panther	Hulk, Edwin Jarvis		
2006	Final Fantasy VII: Advent Children	Loz	English dub	
2006	Wrestlemaniac	El Mascarado		
2007	The Invincible Iron Man	Mandarin		
2007	Dead Silence	Clown		
2007	Camp Lazlo: Where's Lazlo?	Big Bear		
2007	Garfield Gets Real	Billy Bear, Waldo, Eric		
2007	Ben 10: Secret of the Omnitrix	Cannonbolt, Way Big	Television film	
2007	Doctor Strange: The Sorcerer Supreme	Oliver		
2008	Dragonlance: Dragons of Autumn Twilight	Flint Fireforge, Fewmaster Toede, Hederick		
2008	Her Lion's Jump	Fred		
2008	The Incredible Hulk	Hulk, Abomination		
2008	Garfield's Fun Fest	Billy Bear, Junior Bear		
2008	Next Avengers: Heroes of Tomorrow	Hulk		
2008	Orlando's Joint	The Bugman		
2009	Hulk Vs.	Hulk		
2009	Garfield's Pet Force	Billy Bear, Horned Guard		
2009	Bionicle: The Legend Reborn	Tuma		
2009	Made by Molly	Galoot		
2010	Batman: Under the Red Hood	Mercenary #1, Amazo, Guard		
2011	All-Star Superman	Krull		
2011	Hellraiser: Revelations	Pinhead		
2011	Phineas and Ferb the Movie: Across the 2nd Dimension	Additional voices		
2011	Batman: Year One	Detective Flass		
2012	The Outback	Cutter		
2012	Back to the Sea	Fat Seagull		
2012	Ben 10: Destroy All Aliens	Way Big, Evil Way Big	Television film	
2012	Top Cat: The Movie	Robot, Gorilla	English dub	
2012	Superman vs. The Elite	Perry White		
2012	Dino Time	Dr. Santiago		
2013	Scooby-Doo! Mask of the Blue Falcon	Jack Rabble, Cruel Dynomutt		
2013	Lego Marvel Super Heroes: Maximum Overload	Hulk, S.H.I.E.L.D. Sentry		
2013	Iron Man & Hulk: Heroes United	Hulk		
2014	JLA Adventures: Trapped in Time	Lex Luthor		
2014	Avengers Confidential: Black Widow & Punisher	The Hulk, Ren	English dub	
2014	Road to Ninja: Naruto the Movie	Kakuzu	English dub	
2014	A Letter to Momo	Iwa	English dub	
2014	Scooby-Doo! WrestleMania Mystery	The Bear		
2014	Son of Batman	Killer Croc		
2014	Iron Man & Captain America: Heroes United	Hulk, S.H.I.E.L.D. Agent		
2014	Scooby-Doo! Frankencreepy	Frankencreep		
2015	Scooby-Doo! Moon Monster Madness	Hudson Baron, Alien		
2015	Jungle Shuffle	Cusumba, Chimera		
2015	Batman Unlimited: Monster Mayhem	Solomon Grundy		
2016	Hulk: Where Monsters Dwell	Hulk, Countdown Voice		
2017	Lego Scooby-Doo! Blowout Beach Bash	Dwight Monkfish		
2017	Justice League Dark	Ghast		
2017	DC Super Hero Girls: Intergalactic Games	Brainiac, Kryptomites		
2018	Scooby-Doo! & Batman: The Brave and the Bold	Harvey Bullock		
2018	Batman Ninja	Gorilla Grodd, Deathstroke	English dub	
2018	Lego DC Super Hero Girls: Super-Villain High	Seven Sins		
2018	Lego DC Comics Super Heroes: Aquaman – Rage of Atlantis	Lobo	Direct-to-video	
2018	DC Super Hero Girls: Legends of Atlantis	Burly Man		
2018	Lego Marvel Super Heroes: Black Panther - Trouble in Wakanda	Hulk		
2019	Lego DC Batman: Family Matters	Solomon Grundy		
2019	Invader Zim: Enter the Florpus	Peace Day Host, Ham Voice, Alien Guard, Communications Officer, Man		
2020	Mortal Kombat Legends: Scorpion's Revenge	Demon Torturer, Shao Kahn		
2020	Lego DC: Shazam!: Magic and Monsters	Lobo, Oom		
2020	DC Showcase: Adam Strange	Bartender		
2020	Happy Halloween, Scooby-Doo!	Alpha Jackal-Lantern, Agent Malarkey		
2021	Batman: The Long Halloween	Solomon Grundy, Vincent Falcone, Large Triad		
2021	Mortal Kombat Legends: Battle of the Realms	Shao Kahn		
2021	Scooby-Doo! The Sword and the Scoob	Black Knight		
2021	Trollhunters: Rise of the Titans	AAARRRGGHH!!!		
2021	Teen Titans Go! See Space Jam	Nerdluck Pound, Nerdluck Blanko, Nerdluck Bang, Monstar Blanko, Monstar Bang		
2021	Injustice	Captain Atom		
2022	Teen Titans Go! & DC Super Hero Girls: Mayhem in the Multiverse	Jor-El, Solomon Grundy		
2023	Scooby-Doo! and Krypto, Too!	Solomon Grundy, Perry White		
2023	Lego Marvel Avengers: Code Red	Hulk, Santa Claus, Wendigos	Disney+ television special	
2023	Merry Little Batman	Santa, Scarecrow, Crazy Man		
2024	Tales of the Teenage Mutant Ninja Turtles	Splinter (vermin-speak voice), Muckman / Roderick "Rod" Underwood Sr., Roamin, Additional voices	Recurring role	
2024	Lego Marvel Avengers: Mission Demolition	Hulk, Ghost Rider, Devil Dinosaur	Disney+ television special	
2025	A Chuck E. Cheese Christmas	Mr. Munch, Santa Claus, Troll King	television film	
2025	Lego Marvel Avengers: Strange Tails	Hulk, Santa Claus, Waiter	Disney+ television special	

=== Shorts ===
List of voice performance in shorts
Year	Title	Role	Notes	Ref.
2022	Sonic Drone Home	Knuckles		
2026	Chuck E. Cheese Minisodes	Mr. Munch, Santa Claus		

=== Video games ===
List of voice and English dubbing performances in video games
Year	Title	Role	Notes	Ref.
2002	X-Men: Next Dimension	Magneto, Sabretooth, Juggernaut		
2003	X2: Wolverine's Revenge	Magneto, Sabretooth, Juggernaut		
2003	The Cat in the Hat	Larry Quinn		
2003	Terminator 3: Rise of the Machines	Additional voices		
2004	Jet Li: Rise to Honor	Additional voices		
2004	The Bard's Tale	Additional voices		
2004	Lineage II	Male Orc		
2004	Van Helsing	Valerious		
2004	Tales of Symphonia	Additional voices		
2004	Ghosthunter	Warden McCarthy, Priest, Redneck Sniper		
2004	The SpongeBob SquarePants Movie	Dennis, additional voices		
2004	Ratchet & Clank: Up Your Arsenal	Joe		
2004	Spyro: A Hero's Tail	Bentley, Wally the Walrus		
2004	EverQuest II	Ice Giants, Sgt. Fireiron, Guard Tigar, Guard Tanglor		
2004	Vampire: The Masquerade – Bloodlines	Tommy Flayton, David Hatter, The Gargoyle		
2004	Metal Gear Solid 3: Snake Eater	DOD Official		
2004	Viewtiful Joe 2	Frost Tiger		
2004	The Lord of the Rings: The Battle for Middle-earth	Haradrim		
2005	God of War	Poseidon		
2005	Twisted Metal: Head-On	Sweet Tooth		
2005	SWAT 4	Andrew Taronne, Male Suspect, Allen Kruse		
2005	Jade Empire	Iron Soldier, additional voices		
2005	Predator: Concrete Jungle	Bruno Borgia		
2005	Madagascar	Darnell the Elephant, Fossa, Sailor #2		
2005	Batman Begins	Additional voices	Grouped under "Also Featuring"	
2005	Conker: Live & Reloaded	Additional voices		
2005	Tom Clancy's Rainbow Six: Lockdown	Additional voices		
2005	Dungeons & Dragons: Dragonshard	Additional voices		
2005	True Crime: New York City	Additional voices		
2005	Destroy All Humans!	Cop, Navy Admiral		
2005	The Incredible Hulk: Ultimate Destruction	Additional voices		
2005	Scooby-Doo! Unmasked	Zen Tuo, Black Knight, Cave Man, Joe Grimm, Chinese Zombie, Circus Strongman, Ho Fong		
2005	Evil Dead: Regeneration	Deadites, Bloated Corpse, Rail Boss		
2005	The SpongeBob SquarePants Movie: The Video Game	Dennis		
2005	The Matrix: Path of Neo	Agent Johnson, Roland, SWAT Soldier		
2005	Viewtiful Joe: Red Hot Rumble	Frost Tiger, Joker		
2005	Neopets: The Darkest Faerie	King Skarl, Hubert, Torakar, Master Torak		
2005	Age of Empires III	Ivan the Terrible		
2006	The Lord of the Rings: The Battle for Middle-earth II	Haradrim Warriors		
2006	Neopets: Petpet Adventures: The Wand of Wishing	Werhond		
2006	Guild Wars: Factions	Baron Mirek Vasburg, additional voices		
2006	Over the Hedge	Dwayne the Exterminator, Rat #2		
2006	Scooby-Doo: Frights! Camery! Mystery!	Sly Ripley, Chef		
2006	Pirates of the Caribbean: The Legend of Jack Sparrow	Bosun, Koehler, Spanish Guard		
2006	Yakuza	Utabori & Additional voices		
2006	Zatch Bell! Mamodo Fury	Demolt		
2006	Baten Kaitos Origins	Baelheit		
2006	Just Cause	El Presidente Salvador Mendoza		
2006	God Hand	Felix, Debussy		
2006	Scooby-Doo! Who's Watching Who?	Buddy McDowd, Mr. Samson, Redbeard's Ghost		
2006	Marc Eckō's Getting Up: Contents Under Pressure	Additional voices		
2006	Destroy All Humans! 2	Additional voices		
2006	Microsoft Flight Simulator X	Additional voices		
2006	Flushed Away	The Toad		
2006	Marvel: Ultimate Alliance	Mephisto		
2006	Nicktoons: Battle for Volcano Island	Mawgu, Crab Sarge, Plant Bully		
2006	Gears of War	Damon Baird, Berserker		
2006	Happy Feet	Lovelace		
2006	Resistance: Fall of Man	Chimera		
2007	World of Warcraft: The Burning Crusade	Jan'alai, Kil'jaeden		
2007	Rogue Galaxy	Captain Dorgengoa, Sherio, King Albioth		
2007	Ghost Rider	Blade, Caretaker		
2007	Virtua Fighter 5	Commentator		
2007	300: March to Glory	Captain, Mardonius, Ephialtes		
2007	Tom Clancy's Ghost Recon Advanced Warfighter 2	Additional voices		
2007	Fantastic Four: Rise of the Silver Surfer	Additional voices		
2007	God of War II	Typhon		
2007	Brave: The Search for Spirit Dancer	Wendigo, Thunderbird, Sasquatch		
2007	The Darkness	Kamikaze Darkling		
2007	Transformers: The Game	Ratchet, Sideswipe, Autobot Drones		
2007	BioShock	Additional voices		
2007	Jeanne d'Arc	La Hire		
2007	Blue Dragon	General Szabo	English dub	
2007	Guild Wars: Eye of the North	Ogden Stonehealer		
2007	Lair	General Atta Kai, Prisoner, Farmer, Burner		
2007	Halo 3	Brutes		
2007	Spider-Man: Friend or Foe	Sandman, Scorpion		
2007	Ben 10: Protector of Earth	Cannonbolt, Forever Knight		
2007	Assassin's Creed	Jubair al-Hakim, Abu'l Nuqoud		
2007	Uncharted: Drake's Fortune	Descendants		
2007	Unreal Tournament 3	Reward Announcer		
2007	Mass Effect	Saren Arterius		
2007	The Golden Compass	Iorek Byrnison		
2008	No More Heroes	Dr. Shake, Randall Lovikov		
2008	The Spiderwick Chronicles	Mulgarath, Redcap		
2008	Lost Odyssey	Technician		
2008	God of War: Chains of Olympus	Atlas, Persian King		
2008	Iron Man	Obadiah Stane / Iron Monger, Maggia Soldier, Afghan Soldier, AIM President		
2008	Speed Racer: The Videogame	Nitro Venderhoss		
2008	Kung Fu Panda	Shifu		
2008	Ninja Gaiden 2	Marbus, Tengu		
2008	The Incredible Hulk	Hulk		
2008	Metal Gear Solid 4: Guns of the Patriots	"Beast" Voices of the Beauty and the Beast Unit		
2008	Line Rider 2: Unbound	Chaz		
2008	Lego Batman: The Video Game	Bane, Hush		
2008	Golden Axe: Beast Rider	Additional voices		
2008	Saints Row 2	Additional voices		
2008	Spider-Man: Web of Shadows	Rhino		
2008	The Legend of Spyro: Dawn of the Dragon	Meadow		
2008	Call of Duty: World at War	Nikolai Belinski, Dr. Ludvig Maxis		
2008	007: Quantum of Solace	Additional voices, Henry Mitchell		
2008	Madagascar: Escape 2 Africa	Maurice, Rico		
2008	Valkyria Chronicles	Largo Potter	English dub	
2008	Kung Fu Panda: Legendary Warriors	Shifu, King Gong, Yak Goon #2		
2008	Gears of War 2	Damon Baird, Tai Kaliso, Locust Drone, Boomer		
2008	World of Warcraft: Wrath of the Lich King	Kologarn, Hodir		
2008	Left 4 Dead	The Infected		
2008	Prince of Persia	The Mourning King		
2008	Rise of the Argonauts	Hercules		
2008	Tak and the Guardians of Gross	Melty Juju, Woodies		
2009	Warhammer 40,000: Dawn of War II	Captain Davian Thule, Eldar Warlock, Araghast the Pillager, Bloodletters, Ulkair the Great Unclean One, Veldoran the Warlock, Space Marine Voice of God	Also in Chaos Rising and Retribution	
2009	Eat Lead: The Return of Matt Hazard	Space Marine, Bandit, Employee		
2009	Watchmen: The End is Nigh	Additional voices		
2009	MadWorld	Von Twirlenkiller, Shamans, Big Long Driller		
2009	Monsters vs. Aliens	General W.R. Monger		
2009	Ninja Blade	Businessman		
2009	Company of Heroes: Tales of Valor	Wilson, Pilot		
2009	X-Men Origins: Wolverine	Additional voices		
2009	Bionic Commando	Grunt #1, Overwatch		
2009	Terminator Salvation	Resistance Soldiers		
2009	Prototype	Blackwatch Officer, miscellaneous voices		
2009	Ghostbusters: The Video Game	Additional voices		
2009	Transformers: Revenge of the Fallen	Demolishor, Devastator, Grindor, additional voices		
2009	Shadow Complex	Paramilitaries		
2009	Batman: Arkham Asylum	Bane, Henchman #2, Carl Todd		
2009	Marvel: Ultimate Alliance 2	Hulk, Thing, Carnage		
2009	Cloudy with a Chance of Meatballs	Tim Lockwood		
2009	Where the Wild Things Are	The Bull		
2009	Halo 3: ODST	Brutes		
2009	Ninja Gaiden Sigma 2	Marbus, Tengu		
2009	Undead Knights	Gloucester		
2009	Uncharted 2: Among Thieves	Daniel Pinkerton, Serbian Soldiers, Guardians		
2009	Ratchet & Clank Future: A Crack in Time	Libra, Agorian #1, Snowball		
2009	Dragon Age: Origins	Additional voices		
2009	Call of Duty: Modern Warfare 2	Shadow Company Soldier #1, Task Force 141 Soldier #2, Ranger #3, Brazilian Multiplayer Announcer, Additional Voice Talent		
2009	Assassin's Creed II	Mario Auditore		
2009	Left 4 Dead 2	The Infected		
2009	The Secret Saturdays: Beasts of the 5th Sun	Zon, Komodo, Munya		
2009	Naruto Shippūden: Clash of Ninja Revolution 3	Kakuzu	English dub	
2010	Final Fantasy XIII	Cocoon Inhabitants	English dub	
2010	Naruto: Ultimate Ninja Heroes 3	Kakuzu	English dub	
2010	Valkyria Chronicles II	Jean Townshend	English dub	
2010	Naruto Shippuden: Ultimate Ninja Storm 2	Kakuzu	English dub	
2010	Darksiders	Charred Council, additional voices		
2010	Dark Void	Sarpa, Survivor Commander		
2010	Mass Effect 2	Warden Kuril, Maelon, Aresh, additional voices		
2010	No More Heroes 2: Desperate Struggle	Dr. Letz Shake		
2010	God of War III	Ares, Barbarian King, Typhon		
2010	Resonance of Fate	Additional voices		
2010	Crackdown 2	Additional voices		
2010	Dead to Rights: Retribution	SWAT, GAC Commanders		
2010	Prince of Persia: The Forgotten Sands	Ratash		
2010	Alpha Protocol	Henry Leland, Ali Shaheed		
2010	Transformers: War for Cybertron	Megatron, Ratchet, Omega Supreme, Trypticon		
2010	Clash of the Titans	King Kepheus, King Satyros, Soldiers		
2010	StarCraft II: Wings of Liberty	Zeratul, Rory Swann		
2010	Spider-Man: Shattered Dimensions	Ultimate Carnage		
2010	Ben 10 Ultimate Alien: Cosmic Destruction	Enhanced Terracotta General, Dragon		
2010	Fallout: New Vegas	Tabitha, Rhonda		
2010	Vanquish	Daniel Grassi		
2010	Star Wars: The Force Unleashed II	Riot Trooper, Jumptrooper		
2010	Megamind: Ultimate Showdown	Destruction Worker		
2010	Megamind: Mega Team Unite	Destruction Worker		
2010	God of War: Ghost of Sparta	Midas		
2010	Kinectimals	Captain Blackwood		
2010	Call of Duty: Black Ops	Nikolai Belinski		
2010	Assassin's Creed: Brotherhood	Mario Auditore		
2010	Splatterhouse	Miscellaneous Monsters		
2010	Tron: Evolution	Kevin Flynn / CLU		
2011	Marvel vs. Capcom 3: Fate of Two Worlds	Hulk		
2011	Bulletstorm	Skulls, Flytrap		
2011	Rango	Bad Bill, Zombies, Mr. Timms		
2011	Kung Fu Panda 2	Master Shifu, Gorillas, Komodo Dragons		
2011	Cartoon Network: Punch Time Explosion	Aku, Vilgax		
2011	Green Lantern: Rise of the Manhunters	Manhunter		
2011	Transformers: Dark of the Moon	Megatron, Ratchet, Bumblebee, Sideswipe, additional voices		
2011	Shadows of the Damned	Demons		
2011	Rise of Nightmares	Gregor		
2011	Resistance 3	Brawler Chimera		
2011	Gears of War 3	Damon Baird, Locust Drone, Locust Boomer		
2011	X-Men: Destiny	Juggernaut, additional voices		
2011	Spider-Man: Edge of Time	J. Jonah Jameson, Atrocity, Rhino		
2011	Might & Magic Heroes VI	Kha-Beleth		
2011	Skylanders: Spyro's Adventure	Additional voices		
2011	Batman: Arkham City	Bane, Solomon Grundy, Henchmen #2		
2011	Naruto Shippuden: Ultimate Ninja Impact	Kakuzu	English dub	
2011	The Lord of the Rings: War in the North	Agandaur		
2011	Uncharted 3: Drake's Deception	Lt. Draza, Hired Thugs, Brute, Serbian Soldiers		
2011	Cabela's Survival: Shadows of Katmai	Jonah Winterfox		
2011	Halo: Combat Evolved Anniversary	CCS-Class Battlecruiser Truth and Reconciliation Artificial Intelligence, 049 Abject Testament		
2011	Kinect Disneyland Adventures	Fortune Red		
2011	Ultimate Marvel vs. Capcom 3	Hulk		
2011	Star Wars: The Old Republic	Grand Marshal Cheketta, additional voices		
2012	Final Fantasy XIII-2	Additional voices	English dub	
2012	Syndicate	Additional voices		
2012	Mass Effect 3	Captain Ka'hairal Balak, General Septimus Oraka, Jorgal Thurak		
2012	Naruto Shippuden: Ultimate Ninja Storm Generations	Kakuzu, Gato	English dub	
2012	Armored Core V	Ray "RD" Dominato, City Police Officer C, Zodiac No. 1		
2012	Kid Icarus: Uprising	Magnus, Poseidon		
2012	Kinect Star Wars	Sun Guards, Dud Bolt		
2012	Prototype 2	Additional voices		
2012	Starhawk	Rifters, Outcast, Mayor Jonas Clayton, additional voices		
2012	Diablo III	Additional voices, Monster Voice Effects		
2012	Madagascar 3: The Video Game	Maurice, Animal Control Officers, London Citizens		
2012	Lego Batman 2: DC Super Heroes	Clayface, Killer Croc, Man-Bat		
2012	The Amazing Spider-Man	Rhino, additional voices		
2012	Kingdom Hearts 3D: Dream Drop Distance	Kevin Flynn / CLU	English dub; Grouped under "Featuring the Disney Character Voice Talents of"	
2012	Darksiders II	Basileus, Frostbane, Belial, Blackroot, Soul Arbiter, Undead General, Wailing Host		
2012	Transformers: Fall of Cybertron	Megatron, Ratchet, Metroplex		
2012	Wipeout 3	Kenny, Hazel Von Furball		
2012	Guild Wars 2	Mad King Thorn, Ogden Stonehealer, Kralkatorrik, Turai Ossa, Bell Maestro, additional voices		
2012	World of Warcraft: Mists of Pandaria	Xin the Weaponmaster, Rak'gor Bloodrazor, Eitrigg		
2012	Resident Evil 6	Enemies	English dub	
2012	Skylanders: Giants	Slam Bam, Zook, Warnado, additional voices		
2012	Assassin's Creed III	Nicholas Biddle		
2012	Transformers: Prime – The Game	Dreadwing, Vehicons		
2012	Marvel Avengers: Battle for Earth	Hulk, Doctor Doom		
2012	Halo 4	Additional voices		
2012	Call of Duty: Black Ops II	Dr. Ludvig Maxis, Nikolai Belinski		
2012	Rise of the Guardians: The Video Game	North		
2012	Epic Mickey 2: The Power of Two	Additional voices		
2012	Family Guy: Back to the Multiverse	Additional voices		
2013	Anarchy Reigns	Additional voices		
2013	Sly Cooper: Thieves in Time	Grizz		
2013	God of War: Ascension	Hades		
2013	Starcraft II: Heart of the Swarm	Zeratul		
2013	Gears of War: Judgment	Damon Baird		
2013	Naruto Shippuden: Ultimate Ninja Storm 3	Kakuzu, Gyūki, Third Raikage	English dub	
2013	Injustice: Gods Among Us	Bane, Solomon Grundy		
2013	Fuse	Guards		
2013	Marvel Heroes	Hulk / Bruce Banner, Juggernaut, Blob, Mandarin, Beast		
2013	The Last of Us	Additional voices		
2013	Deadpool	Cable, Blockbuster		
2013	Dota 2	Disruptor, Spirit Breaker, Treant Protector, Undying, Ursa, Warlock's Golem		
2013	The Wonderful 101	James Shirogane, Chewgi		
2013	Wipeout: Create and Crash	Hazel Von Robonuts, Professor B. Awulf, Zombie Zed		
2013	Skylanders: Swap Force	Slam Bam, Zook, Warnado, additional voices		
2013	Lego Marvel Super Heroes	Hulk / Bruce Banner, Doctor Doom, Beast, Mysterio, Thunderbolt Ross / Red Hulk, Volstagg		
2013	Teenage Mutant Ninja Turtles	Dogpound		
2013	Ratchet & Clank: Into the Nexus	Neftin Prog, Mr. Eye		
2013	Knack	Morgack		
2013	République	Mammoth		
2014	The Elder Scrolls Online	Additional voices		
2014	Lightning Returns: Final Fantasy XIII	Additional voices	English dub	
2014	Naruto Shippuden: Ultimate Ninja Storm Revolution	Kakuzu	English dub	
2014	Infamous Second Son	Angel, Demon		
2014	The Amazing Spider-Man 2	J. Jonah Jameson		
2014	WildStar	Jariel the Archon, Drokk, Megalith		
2014	Transformers: Rise of the Dark Spark	Megatron		
2014	Spider-Man Unlimited	Mysterio, Demogoblin		
2014	Diablo III: Reaper of Souls	Monster Voice Effects, additional voices		
2014	The Sims 4	Sim		
2014	Destiny	City Civilian, Xûr, Ancient Firewall		
2014	Disney Infinity: Marvel Super Heroes	Hulk		
2014	Middle-earth: Shadow of Mordor	Nemesis Orcs		
2014	Skylanders: Trap Team	Snap Shot, Cuckoo Clocker, Slam Bam, Zook, Warnado		
2014	Bayonetta 2	Valiance		
2014	Sunset Overdrive	Additional voices		
2014	Call of Duty: Advanced Warfare	Additional voices		
2014	Lego Batman 3: Beyond Gotham	Solomon Grundy, Black Adam, Black Manta, Killer Croc, Frankenstein		
2015	Code Name: S.T.E.A.M.	Cowardly Lion		
2015	Battlefield Hardline	Tony Alpert		
2015	Infinite Crisis	Doomsday, Gaslight Joker		
2015	Heroes of the Storm	Zeratul		
2015	Mortal Kombat X	Torr, Tremor		
2015	Lego Jurassic World	Dennis Nedry, Paddock Worker Ray		
2015	Batman: Arkham Knight	Militia		
2015	StarCraft II: Legacy of the Void	Zeratul, Rory Swann, Marauder		
2015	King's Quest	Olfie, Stone Goblin		
2015	Disney Infinity 3.0	Hulk		
2015	Mad Max			
2015	Skylanders: SuperChargers	Snap Shot, Slam Bam, Warnado, Zook		
2015	Call of Duty: Black Ops III	Nikolai Belinski, Ludvig Maxis		
2016	Lego Marvel's Avengers	Hulk, Volstagg, Ares, Crossbones		
2016	Naruto Shippuden: Ultimate Ninja Storm 4	Kakuzu, Hagoromo Otsutsuki, The Third Raikage	English dub	
2016	Ratchet & Clank	Felton Razz, Shiv Helix, Blarg #1		
2016	King's Quest – Chapter III: Once Upon A Climb	Stone Goblin		
2016	Teenage Mutant Ninja Turtles: Mutants in Manhattan	Rocksteady, Slash, Stone Warriors		
2016	Mighty No. 9	Seismic		
2016	Master of Orion: Conquer the Stars	Bulrathi Emperor, Silicoid Emperor		
2016	Gears of War 4	Damon Baird, Richard Dalmore, DeeBees, Speaker, Swarm		
2016	World of Final Fantasy	Bahamut	English dub	
2016	Final Fantasy XV	Biggs Callux	English dub	
2016	Lego Dimensions	Mannish Man		
2016	Titanfall 2	Tai Lastimosa		
2016	Let It Die	Additional voices		
2016–present	Overwatch	Soldier: 76		
2017	Kingdom Hearts HD 2.8 Final Chapter Prologue	Kevin Flynn / CLU	English dub; Dream Drop Distance HD (archive footage)	
2017	For Honor	Stigandr		
2017	Crash Bandicoot N.Sane Trilogy	Dingodile, Koala Kong, Komodo Joe, Komodo Moe	Misspelled as "Fred Tatisciore"	
2017	Injustice 2	Bane, Swamp Thing, Martin Stein		
2017	LawBreakers	Nash		
2017	Destiny 2	Xûr/ Male Extras		
2017	Minecraft: Story Mode – Season Two	Jack, Brick, Fred, additional voices	Season 2	
2017	Fortnite: Save the World	Lars, Ned	Lars the Scientist (Save the World)	
2017	Marvel vs. Capcom: Infinite	Hulk, Ghost Rider		
2017	Middle-earth: Shadow of War	Ranger, Helm Hammerhand, Nemesis Ologs		
2017	Wolfenstein II: The New Colossus	Curtis Everton, Demont Conway, Kevin Bannon, Gerald Wilkins	Also appears in Episode Zero and The Amazing Deeds of Captain Wilkins	
2018	Marvel Powers United VR	Hulk, Black Bolt		
2018	Call of Duty: Black Ops 4	Nikolai Belinski, Ludvig Maxis, High Priest of Chaos		
2018	Lego DC Super-Villains	Ares, Black Adam, Black Manta, Clayface, Doomsday, Killer Croc, King Shark, Mongul, Perry White, Solomon Grundy		
2018	Spider-Man	Rhino		
2018	Fallout 76	Daniel Hornwright, Chef Milo, Rough Males, Additional Voices		
2018	Darksiders III	Charred Council, Wrath, Gluttony		
2019	Sekiro: Shadows Die Twice	Doujun, Jinzaemon Kumano		
2019	Judgment	Kyohei Hamura		
2019	League of Legends	Mordekaiser	After rework (English)	
2019	Bloodstained: Ritual of the Night	Benjamin Judd/Coachman		
2019	Crash Team Racing Nitro-Fueled	Dingodile, Komodo Joe & Moe, Penta Penguin, Koala Kong, King Chicken, additional voices		
2019	Marvel Ultimate Alliance 3: The Black Order	Beast, Hulk, Ghost Rider		
2019	Marvel Dimension of Heroes	Hulk	Augmented reality game for mobile devices	
2019	Gears 5	Damon Baird, Deebees, Swarm Drones, NPCs		
2019	Call of Duty: Mobile	Nikolai Belinski, High Priest of Chaos		
2019	Call of Duty: Modern Warfare	"Chimera" Team Leader, Lerch		
2019	Death Stranding	MULEs		
2020	Final Fantasy VII Remake	Don Corneo	English dub	
2020	Trollhunters: Defenders of Arcadia	AAARRRGGHH!!!, Blinky, Gunmar, Vendal, Bagdwella		
2020	Fallout 76: Wastelanders	Captain Oliver Fields, Dylan Rhodes, Hal Gleeson, Additional Voices		
2020	Ghost of Tsushima	Lord Sadamune Oga, White Dye Merchant		
2020	Crash Bandicoot 4: It's About Time	Dingodile		
2020	Bugsnax	Wambus Troubleham		
2020	Yakuza: Like a Dragon	Toshio Arakawa		
2020	Spider-Man: Miles Morales	Rhino		
2021	Psychonauts 2	Gzar Theodore		
2021	Crash Bandicoot: On the Run!	Dingodile, Koala Kong		
2021	Ratchet & Clank: Rift Apart	Additional performers		
2021	Marvel's Avengers	Crossbones / Brock Rumlow		
2021	Fortnite Battle Royale	Fabio Sparklemane		
2021	Nickelodeon All-Star Brawl	Reptar	Voiceover added in the June 2022 update	
2021	Fast & Furious Spy Racers: Rise of SH1FT3R	Bone Grinder		
2021	Halo Infinite	Chak Lok, Spartan Horvath		
2022	Stranger of Paradise: Final Fantasy Origin	Cornelian King		
2022	Lego Star Wars: The Skywalker Saga	Darth Vader		
2022	Evil Dead: The Game	Henrietta, Deadite Berserker, Skeleton		
2022	Overwatch 2	Soldier: 76		
2022	Nickelodeon Kart Racers 3: Slime Speedway	Reptar		
2022	Marvel's Midnight Suns	Hulk		
2023	Nickelodeon All-Star Brawl 2	Reptar		
2023	Mato Anomalies	Gluttony, Old Voice		In-game credits
2023	Justice League: Cosmic Chaos	Starro, Bizarro, George the House		
2023	Diablo IV	Creatures		
2023	DreamWorks All-Star Kart Racing	Shifu		
2023	Naruto x Boruto: Ultimate Ninja Storm Connections	Kakuzu, Hagoromo Otsutsuki		
2023	Teenage Mutant Ninja Turtles: Splintered Fate	Rocksteady		
2024	Like a Dragon: Infinite Wealth	Additional voices	English dub	
2024	Persona 3 Reload	Aohige Pharmacy Shopkeeper, additional voices		
2024	Final Fantasy VII Rebirth	Don Corneo	English dub	
2024	Teenage Mutant Ninja Turtles: Wrath of the Mutants	Rahzar, Rocksteady, The Creep		
2024	Batman: Arkham Shadow	Bane		
2024	Looney Tunes: Wacky World of Sports	Yosemite Sam		
2024	Teenage Mutant Ninja Turtles: Mutants Unleashed	Rocksteady		
2024; 2026	Marvel Rivals	Hulk, Devil Dinosaur		
2025	The Legend of Heroes: Trails Through Daybreak II	Robin Glengow, Grendel Zolga, citizens, HoloCore		
2025	Like a Dragon: Pirate Yakuza in Hawaii	Bartender, Futoshi Shimano		
2025	Doom: The Dark Ages	Hell Priest, Villager Cultists		
2025	Date Everything!	Freddy Yeti		
2025	Yakuza 0 Director's Cut	Futoshi Shimano		
2025	Call of Duty: Black Ops 7	Nikolai Belinski		
2025	Nicktoons & The Dice of Destiny	Reptar, Cynthia, Enemies		
2025	Sonic Racing: CrossWorlds	Storm the Albatross		
2025	Disney Speedstorm	Lotso	Grouped under "Featuring the Voice Talents Of"	
2026	Yakuza Kiwami 3 & Dark Ties	Andre Richardson		
2026	Mouse: P.I. For Hire	John Brown, Captain Simms		
2026	Teenage Mutant Ninja Turtles: Empire City	Rocksteady		
2026	Marvel Tōkon: Fighting Souls	Hulk, Hell Charger / Eli		English dub
2026	Star Wars: Zero Company	The Bruiser		
2026	Grand Theft Auto VI	The Local Population		

=== Audio drama ===
List of voice and dubbing performances in audio dramas
Year	Title	Role	Notes	Ref.
2026	Sonic the Hedgehog Presents: The Chaotix Casefiles	Storm the Albatross, additional voices		

=== Theme parks ===
List of voice performances in theme parks
Year	Title	Role	Notes	Ref.
2006	Expedition Everest	Yeti		
2012	Marvel Super Heroes 4D	Hulk		
2017	Guardians of the Galaxy – Mission: Breakout!	Baby Groot		
2017	Space Mountain	Safety Narrator		
2017	Star Tours – The Adventures Continue	Gungan Pilot		
2017	Justice League: Battle for Metropolis	Lex Luthor		
2024	Country Bear Musical Jamboree	Buff, Rufus		

== Awards and nominations ==
Year	Award	Category	Work	Result	Ref.
2023	Children's and Family Emmy Awards	Outstanding Voice Performance in a Preschool Animated Program	StoryBots: Answer Time	Nominated	
