= The Colors Within =

2024 Japanese animated film by Naoko Yamada

- Theatrical release poster
- Japanese: きみの色
- Revised Hepburn: Kimi no Iro
- Directed by: Naoko Yamada
- Screenplay by: Reiko Yoshida
- Produced by: Wakana Okamura; Kōhei Sakita
- Starring: Akari Takaishi; Sayu Suzukawa; Taisei Kido; Yui Aragaki
- Cinematography: Yoshimitsu Tomita
- Edited by: Kiyoshi Hirose
- Music by: Kensuke Ushio
- Production company: Science Saru
- Distributed by: Toho
- Release dates: June 10, 2024 (Annecy); August 30, 2024
- Running time: 100 minutes
- Country: Japan
- Language: Japanese
- Box office: $2.4 million

The Colors Within (Japanese: きみの色, Hepburn: Kimi no Iro; lit. 'Your Color') is a 2024 Japanese animated drama film. Directed by Naoko Yamada and produced by Science Saru with Story Inc. handling planning & production, it was released in Japanese theaters in August 2024.

== Premise ==
High school student Totsuko has the ability to see people as colors, and is particularly fascinated with the color she sees in her classmate, Kimi. After following Kimi to a used bookstore, Totsuko accidentally implies she can play piano, leading to her joining a band with Kimi, who can play guitar, and Rui, a boy who collects musical equipment and plays the theremin. The trio's friendships develop as they write music and confront issues in their home lives.

== Voice cast ==
Character	Japanese	English
Kimi Sakunaga	Akari Takaishi	Kylie McNeill
Totsuko Higurashi	Sayu Suzukawa	Libby Rue
Rui Kagehira	Taisei Kido	Eddy Lee
Sister Hiyoshiko	Yui Aragaki	Eileen Stevens
Saku Momochi	Yasuko	Hinano Kuzukawa
Shiho Nanakubo	Aoi Yūki	Eden Harker
Sumika Yatsushika	Minako Kotobuki	Maxine Wanderer
Shino Sakunaga	Keiko Toda	Lani Minella

== Production ==
In November 2022, Naoko Yamada stated in an interview with Anime News Network that she was working on a film with Science Saru. The title was announced in December; it was also announced that Reiko Yoshida would be writing the screenplay and that Kensuke Ushio would be composing the music. The ending theme is titled "in the pocket" performed by Mr. Children.

=== Release ===
The film was originally set to be released in Japanese theaters in Q4 2023. In August 2023, Toho announced that the film would be delayed until 2024. The film premiered at the Annecy International Animation Film Festival in June 2024. The film was released in Japanese theaters on August 30, 2024.

Internationally, Encore Films released the film in India on November 22, 2024. GKIDS released an early screening of the film in IMAX on January 23, 2025, in North American theaters with an English dub. It was subsequently released in standard screenings in North America on January 24th, 2025. The film was released in the United Kingdom by Anime Limited on January 31, 2025.

=== Manga adaptation ===
A manga adaptation, written and illustrated by Sanami Suzuki, began serialization on Kadokawa Shoten's Comic Newtype website on July 16, 2024.

== Reception ==
=== Critical reception ===
On the review aggregator website Rotten Tomatoes, 92% of 49 critics' reviews are positive. The website's consensus reads: "Exuberant in both its palette and sound, The Colors Within gets the band together to deliver a kaleidoscopic celebration of human connection." Metacritic, which uses a weighted average, assigned the film a score of 76 out of 100, based on 17 critics, indicating "generally favorable" reviews.

Some viewers have interpreted Totsuko's fascination with Kimi's color as a subtle depiction of same-sex attraction. In particular, this theme was directly raised during Yamada's interview with the British publication Dazed, when the interviewer spoke to the director about queer readings in general and how some people have taken the protagonist's synesthesia as a metaphor for her queerness in particular. Yamada was "baffled and pleasantly surprised" upon hearing this, but noted that "sometimes people come up with (interpretations) I haven't thought of".

==== Accolades ====
Award	Date of ceremony	Category	Recipient(s)	Result	Ref.
Shanghai International Film Festival	June 22, 2024	Best Animation Film	The Colors Within	Won	
Animation Is Film Festival	October 22, 2024	Audience Award	The Colors Within	Won (Note: Tied with Memoir of a Snail.)	
9th Crunchyroll Anime Awards	May 25, 2025	Film of the Year	The Colors Within	Nominated	
53rd Saturn Awards	March 8, 2026	Best International Animated Film	The Colors Within	Nominated	
