= Dave Boat =

American voice actor

- Occupation: Voice actor
- Years active: 1991–present
- Agent(s): Cunningham, Escott, Slevin and Doherty
- Website: www.daveboat.com

Dave Boat is an American voice actor known for his work in animation, films and video games. His roles include Thor and the Thing in various animated series and video games based on Marvel Comics and Lexaeus in the Kingdom Hearts video game series.

== Filmography ==
=== Film ===
Year	Title	Role	Notes	Source
2006	Ultimate Avengers: The Movie	Thor (voice)	Direct-to-video	
2006	Ultimate Avengers II	Thor (voice)	Direct-to-video	
2007	Chicago 10	Norman Mailer, Marshal 1	Documentary	
2011	Snowflake, the White Gorilla	Bald Man, Man with Hat, Male Newscaster (voice)	English version	
2012	Ernest & Celestine	Bear Police Chief (voice)	English version	
2012	Wings	Davidson (voice)	English version	
2012	Wreck-It Ralph	Additional voices		
2013	Legends of Oz: Dorothy's Return	Additional voices		
2013	Frozen	Additional voices		
2014	Maleficent	Creatures (voice)	Uncredited	
2015	Top Cat Begins	Chief Thumbton (voice)	English version	
2015	The Good Dinosaur	Bubbha (voice)		
2017	The Emoji Movie	Additional voices		
2018	White Fang	Jim Hall (voice)	English version	
2018	Suicide Squad: Hell to Pay	Harvey Dent / Two-Face (voice)	Direct-to-video	
2019	Frozen II	Additional voices		
2020	Darkness Into Light: a Rosh Hashanah Story	Adam (voice)	Short film	
2020	The Broken Candle	Gerald	Short film	
2021	Thresh Unbound: A Night at the Inn	Tavern Walla	English version	
TBA	Death Everlasting	Wally Pierce	completed	

=== Television ===
Year	Title	Role	Notes	Source
2000	Nash Bridges	Brad	Episode: "Cop Out"	
2001	The Division	Cop	Episode: "Pilot"	
2005–2015	Family Guy	Rupert, various voices	9 episodes	
2007	Danny Phantom	Vortex, Convention Manager (voice)	Episode: "Torrent of Terror"	
2007	Dirty Sexy Money	Blackmailer on Phone (voice)	Episode: "The Italian Banker"; uncredited	
2009–2011	The Super Hero Squad Show	Thor, The Thing, Baron Mordo, Captain Liechtenstein, Trapster, Uatu, Man-Thing, Dracula, Doc Samson, Watcher, Adam Warlock, additional voices (voice)	48 episodes	
2010	iCarly	Nolan	Episode: "iStart a Fan War"	
2010	T.U.F.F. Puppy	Slush (voice)	Episode: "Chilly Dog"	
2012–2013	Ultimate Spider-Man	Ben Grimm/The Thing, Thor (The Super Hero Squad Show), additional voices	3 episodes	
2012–2018	Doc McStuffins	Awesome Guy, Construction Worker (voice)	8 episodes	
2013	Avengers Assemble	The Thing (voice)	Episode: "Hulk's Day Out"	
2013–2014	Hulk and the Agents of S.M.A.S.H.	The Thing, Ring Announcer (voice)	3 episodes	
2014	Lords of War	Kargath	Episode: "Kargath"	
2014–2017	Clarence	The Mayor, additional voices	7 episodes	
2016	Archer	Eckerd (voice)	2 episodes	
2016	Ask the StoryBots	Molephius (voice)	Episode: "Where Do French Fries Come From?"	
2018	Bobcat Goldthwait's Misfits & Monsters	Various voices	2 episodes	
2018–2019	Rise of the Teenage Mutant Ninja Turtles	Various voices	2 episodes	
2019	Solve: The Podcast	Hamsa (voice)	Episode: "The Real Killer"	
2021	Ridley Jones	Nukilik (voice)	Episode: "Northern Lights"	
2021	What If...?	Additional voices	2 episodes	

=== Video games ===
Year	Title	Role	Notes	Source
1991	Monkey Island 2: LeChuck's Revenge	Inn Keeper, Antique Dealer, Gambler		
1999	Prince of Persia 3D	The Prince		
2001	Arthur's 1st Grade	Mr. Powers		
2001	Nicktoons Nick Tunes	Crocodile, Warthog		
2003	Armed & Dangerous	Goliath, Stig		
2004	Hot Shots Golf Fore!	Sam, Falcon, Greg, Kaz, various voices	English version	
2004	The Sims 2	Adult Male Sim 2		
2004	The Urbz: Sims in the City	Sim		
2004	The Lord of the Rings: The Battle for Middle-Earth	Gondorians		
2005	Twisted Metal: Head-On	Mr. Grimm, Calypso		
2005	Psychonauts	Dragon, Eagle		
2005	Guild Wars	Additional voices		
2005	Star Wars: Battlefront II	Republic Infantry		
2005	Yakuza	Additional voices	English version	
2006	Dirge of Cerberus: Final Fantasy VII	Weiss	English version	
2006	The Sims 2: Open for Business	Sim		
2006	The Lord of the Rings: The Battle for Middle-Earth II	Gondorians		
2006	The Sims 2: Pets	Sim		
2006	The Lord of the Rings: The Battle for Middle-Earth II - The Rise of the Witch-King	Gondorians		
2007	Kingdom Hearts Re: Chain of Memories	Lexaeus	English version	
2007	Crisis Core: Final Fantasy VII	Weiss	English version	
2007	Ratchet & Clank Future: Tools of Destruction	Soldier, Fish Drophyd		
2007	Supreme Commander: Forged Alliance	Additional voices		
2008	Speed Racer	Sonic 'Boom Boom' Renaldi, Scotter Dickey		
2008	Ratchet & Clank Future: Quest for Booty	Wind Turbine Operator		
2008	Resistance 2	Cappelli		
2008	Call of Duty: World at War	Russian Soldier		
2009	X-Men Origins: Wolverine	Additional voices		
2009	Kingdom Hearts 358/2 Days	Lexaeus		
2009	Ratchet & Clank Future: A Crack in Time	Lord Vorselon		
2009	Brütal Legend	Fire Barons, Reapers		
2009	Marvel Super Hero Squad	Thor, Thing		
2009	CSI: Crime Scene Investigation - Deadly Intent	Charles Steer, Hank Hackett, Ernest Goldwasser		
2010	Army of Two: The 40th Day	Heavy Grenadier		
2010	Command & Conquer 4: Tiberian Twilight	Additional voices		
2010	Monkey Island 2 Special Edition: LeChuck's Revenge	Innkeeper, Antique Dealer, Ralphie		
2010	Kingdom Hearts Birth by Sleep	Aeleus	English version	
2010	Prison Break: The Conspiracy	Tom Paxton		
2010	Legend of the Guardians: The Owls of Ga'Hoole	Cormack, Uriah, Pure Ones		
2010	CSI: Fatal Conspiracy	Agent Gene Huntby		
2010	Marvel Super Hero Squad: The Infinity Gauntlet	Thor		
2011	Operation Flashpoint: Red River	Marines		
2011	Marvel Super Hero Squad Online	Sabretooth, The Thing, Thor, Beast, Mysterio, Dracula		
2011	Transformers: Dark of the Moon	Mixmaster		
2011	Cars 2: The Video Game	Raoul CaRoule		
2011	Ratchet & Clank: All 4 One	Vorn Garblak		
2011	Marvel Super Hero Squad: Comic Combat	Thor, Imps		
2011	Final Fantasy XIII-2	Additional voices	English version	
2012	Kingdom Hearts 3D: Dream Drop Distance	Aeleus	English version	
2012	Kinect Star Wars	Imperial Troops		
2012	Transformers: Fall of Cybertron	Vortex		
2012	World of Warcraft: Mists of Pandaria	Blademaster Ishi, Malkorok		
2012	Call of Duty: Black Ops II	Samuel Stuhlinger		
2013	Poker Night 2	Max		
2013	Marvel Heroes	The Thing, Hood, Shocker		
2013	Lego Legends of Chima: Laval's Journey	Ruckus, Runk		
2013	Ultima Forever: Quest for the Avatar	Brute, Male Fighter		
2013	The Bureau: XCOM Declassified	XCOM Agent		
2013	Lego Marvel Super Heroes	Bullseye, Carnage, MODOK, The Thing, Venom		
2013	Lightning Returns: Final Fantasy XIII	Cleric		
2014	The Lego Movie Videogame	Additional voices		
2014	Hearthstone: Heroes of Warcraft	Whompwhisker		
2014	inFamous: Second Son	Policeman, Thug		
2014	The Amazing Spider-Man 2	Hammerhead, Russian Fist		
2014	Transformers: Rise of the Dark Spark	Vortex, Lockdown Sniper, Decepticon Soldier		
2014	Skylanders: Trap Team	Brawl and Chain, Headwick		
2014	Call of Duty: Advanced Warfare	Additional voices		
2014	World of Warcraft: Warlords of Draenor	KarGath, Twilight Cultist Orc		
2015	Lego Jurassic World	Additional voices		
2015	Batman: Arkham Knight	Officer Owens, Fireman, Militia		
2015	Lego Dimensions	Army Col. Lynch, Agent Rorke		
2015	Transformers: Devastation	Blitzwing, Devastator, Insecticon		
2015	StarCraft II: Legacy of the Void	Additional voices		
2016	Lego Marvel's Avengers	Additional voices		
2016	Star Ocean: Integrity and Faithlessness	General Alma		
2016	Teenage Mutant Ninja Turtles: Mutants in Manhattan	Armaggon		
2016	Lego Star Wars: The Force Awakens	Additional voices		
2016	World of Warcraft: Legion	Gorelix the Fleshripper, Ritssyn Flamescowl, Lord Malgath		
2016	Let It Die	Player Character		
2017	Halo Wars 2	Additional voices		
2017	Fortnite	Kyle		
2017	Star Wars: Battlefront II	Additional voices		
2018	God of War	Additional voices		
2018	State of Decay 2	Survivor		
2018	Call of Duty: Black Ops 4	Samuel Stuhlinger		
2019	Subnautica: Below Zero	Cal, Parvan Ivanov		
2019	Days Gone	Additional voices		
2019	Marvel Ultimate Alliance 3: The Black Order	Ben Grimm/The Thing		
2019	Asgard's Wrath	Ancients, Chieftains		
2020	Doom Eternal	UAC Scientist, Doom Hunter, Reporter		
2020	XCOM: Chimera Squad	Celio Dash		
2020	Mafia: Definitive Edition	Gangster, Border Patrol Agent		
2020	World of Warcraft: Shadowlands	Huln Highmountain		
2021	Sam & Max: This Time It's Virtual	Max, Helios Papadopolis, Cap'N Aquabear		
2022	Elex II	Radyk, Askil, Brax		
2024	The Legend of Heroes: Trails Through Daybreak	Salvatore Gotti, Giacomo Conte		
2025	The Legend of Heroes: Trails Through Daybreak II	Salvatore Gotti		
