= Transformers: Dark of the Moon (video game) =

2011 video game

- PlayStation 3, Xbox 360 and Nintendo DS (Note: For DS, Autobots only) cover art
- Developers: High Moon Studios (PS3 and Xbox 360); Behaviour Interactive (Wii, 3DS and DS); EA Mobile (iOS, Symbian and Blackberry)
- Publishers: Activision (PS3, Xbox 360, Wii, N3DS and NDS); Hasbro Interactive (Wii, NDS, N3DS, PS3 and Xbox 360)
- Composer: Jeff Broadbent (Note: Only composed for the PlayStation 3, Wii, and Xbox 360 versions.)
- Engine: Unreal Engine 3
- Platforms: Nintendo 3DS, Nintendo DS, Symbian, iOS, BlackBerry, PlayStation 3, Wii, Xbox 360
- Release: NA: June 14, 2011; EU: June 24, 2011; AU: June 29, 2011
- Genre: Action-adventure
- Modes: Single-player, multiplayer

Transformers: Dark of the Moon is an action-adventure video game based on the 2011 film of the same name. It is the sequel to 2009's Transformers: Revenge of the Fallen, and the third and final video game adaptation of the live-action Transformers film series. Unlike the first two games, Dark of the Moon follows an original story, set before the events of the film it is based on, and features only one campaign, which alternates between the Autobots and the Decepticons. A spin-off, Transformers: Rise of the Dark Spark, was released in June 2014.

There are three different versions of the game: one for the Xbox 360 and PlayStation 3, developed by High Moon Studios; one for the Wii and Nintendo 3DS, titled Transformers: Dark of the Moon Stealth Force Edition; and two for the DS titled Transformers: Dark of the Moon - Autobots and Transformers: Dark of the Moon - Decepticons, developed by Behaviour Interactive. The gameplay in the Xbox 360 and PlayStation 3 versions is similar to High Moon Studios' previous title, Transformers: War for Cybertron. All versions of the game were published by Activision in June 2011, and received mixed reviews. Electronic Arts published mobile versions of the game for Symbian, iOS and BlackBerry.

== Gameplay ==
Transformers: Dark of the Moon builds upon the gameplay of High Moon's preceding Transformers: War for Cybertron. It is a third-person shooter that has players fight various types of AI enemies in both single-player and multiplayer modes. Unlike its predecessors, Dark of the Moon features a single linear campaign rather than one for each faction, with players changing between the Autobots' and the Decepticons' perspective between levels. This campaign structure would be adopted for High Moon's following Transformers: Fall of Cybertron.

Most notably, the game introduces a new feature called "Stealth Force". It closely follows its depiction in the film, where characters may move freely and use weapons while in vehicle form. In both vehicle and robot form, characters have access to two special abilities, which change when the player transforms. For example, Ironhide may have the ability to throw grenades in robot form, and a speed-up ability in vehicle form.

The multiplayer component of the game features four classes: Scout, Hunter, Commander and Warrior, which all have specific traits, such as the Scout being faster than the other classes, or the Warrior having more health.

== Synopsis ==
=== Setting ===
Dark of the Moon takes place roughly three years after the events of Revenge of the Fallen. Earth continues to be consumed by the deadly war between the heroic Autobots, led by Optimus Prime, and the evil Decepticons, led by Megatron. The former co-operate with mankind to investigate and prevent Decepticons' activities around the world, while the latter make preparations for the upcoming "Operation: Pillar", which will allow them to finally defeat their rivals and restore their home planet of Cybertron to its former glory, destroying all life on Earth in the process.

=== Characters ===
Autobots	Playable				
Autobots	Xbox 360	PS3	Wii	3DS	NDS
Optimus Prime	Yes	Yes	Yes	Yes	Yes
Bumblebee^{c}^{d}	Yes	Yes	Yes	Yes	Yes
Ironhide	Yes	Yes	Yes	Yes	Yes
Mirage/Dino	Yes	Yes	Yes	Yes	Yes
Warpath	Multiplayer	Multiplayer	No	No	No
Ratchet^{a}	Multiplayer	Multiplayer	No	No	No
Sideswipe^{b}	Downloadable	Downloadable	No	No	No
Breakaway^{c}^{d}	Multiplayer	Multiplayer	No	No	No
Decepticons	Playable				
Decepticons	Xbox 360	PS3	Wii	3DS	NDS
Megatron	Yes	Yes	Yes	Yes	Yes
Soundwave	Yes	Yes	Yes	Yes	Yes
Lockdown	No	No	Yes	Yes	Yes
Starscream	Yes	Yes	No	No	No
Laserbeak	Yes	Yes	No	No	No
Shockwave	Multiplayer	Multiplayer	No	No	No
Crowbar	No	No	Multiplayer	No	Yes
Crankcase	Multiplayer	Multiplayer	No	No	No

^aCharacter can be unlocked by pre-ordering the game from Amazon.com
^bCharacter can be unlocked by pre-ordering the game from GameStop
^cCharacter can be unlocked as a skin for the 3DS if the game is bought at Toys 'R Us
^dCharacter can be unlocked as a deco in-game character for the Wii and/or DS if the game is bought at Target.

=== Plot ===
==== Xbox 360 and PlayStation 3 ====
The Autobot scout Bumblebee is sent somewhere in South America to plant Wheeljack's virus to a Decepticon transmitter that is listening to the Autobots' transmissions with NEST. Though he encounters heavy resistance from Decepticon forces, he ultimately prevails with the help of Optimus Prime and Sideswipe. Afterwards, the Autobots attempt to defend the city of Detroit from Decepticon forces led by the Constructicon Mixmaster. The Autobot weapon specialist Ironhide and medical officer Ratchet lead the defensive, with the former ultimately prevailing with the help of an experimental rocket launcher provided by Wheeljack, killing Mixmaster after a lengthy battle and chasing away the remaining Decepticons.

Meanwhile, somewhere in South America, Sideswipe disappears during his mission to investigate Decepticon activity in a jungle, and Mirage is sent to investigate alongside Bumblebee. On the way to meet with him, Mirage encounters the vicious Decepticon second-in-command Starscream, who attacks him as he was about to cross a bridge, destroying it and injuring Mirage. Unable to transform or use his weapons, Mirage opts to sneak past the Decepticon troops instead, using his camouflage ability to make his way to a crashed NEST helicopter unobserved and get a supply drop containing weaponry. He then fights his way past the remaining Decepticons alongside Bumblebee, ultimately finding and rescuing Sideswipe, who reveals that the ruins he was investigating were built over an ancient Cybertronian space port; the Decepticons had already commenced the countdown for the launch of a docked spacecraft and, despite the Autobots' best efforts, it manages to take off.

Elsewhere, the Decepticon Soundwave is ordered by Megatron to investigate a former Sector 7 base on an island. Aided by his minon Laserbeak, Soundwave fights his way through the Autobot troops guarding the base and retrieves information about a crash on the moon in the 1960s, as well as some advanced technology called MechTech, which he destroys by triggering a volcanic eruption, before escaping the base. At the same time, Starscream is sent to Nepal to find and destroy the remaining MechTech that is about to be airlifted by the massive Aerialbot Stratosphere from a NEST facility somewhere in the snowy mountain range. Upon killing the other Aerialbots - Air Raid, Breakaway and Silverbolt - he destroys Stratosphere mid-air, along with all the technology he is carrying, though he manages to retrieve a weapon and returns with it to the Decepticon base in Siberia, unaware that it had a tracker on it.

The Autobots subsequently invade the base, but Megatron fights them off, killing Warpath in the process. He then finds a cryotube holding a frozen Shockwave, the infamous Decepticon scientist and assassin, whom he frees from his imprisonment, before facing Optimus Prime. Megatron prevails and throws the beaten Optimus into the pit holding Shockwave and the Driller - a giant worm-beast like robot controlled directly by Shockwave. As Megatron makes his escape, Optimus fights Shockwave and his Driller and defeats them, though they flee afterwards. He is then contacted by Ratchet, whom he tells that, though the battle is won for now, the war is far from over. Meanwhile, Megatron meets with Starscream, Soundwave, and Shockwave somewhere in Africa to launch "Operation: Pillar," assuring his fellow Decepticons that Cybertron shall be reborn soon.

==== Wii and Nintendo 3DS ====
As the Autobots continue their hunt for the Decepticons despite humanity believing that they have fled the planet, Optimus Prime, Bumblebee, and Mirage head to a desert to test the new "Stealth Force Mode" upgrade provided by the Autobot scientist Wheeljack. Once they're done, Optimus tries to contact NEST, only to find their communication link was jammed, so he sends Bumblebee to investigate a Decepticon base nearby and learn why. Discovering that the Decepticons are using satellite dishes to jam their communications, Bumblebee shuts them down, but loses connection with the others upon venturing into the base. Optimus goes after him and, at Wheeljack's suggestion, uploads a virus into three satellites, allowing the Autobots to learn the Decepticons' motive. As Optimus is fighting waves of incoming Decepticons, Bumblebee escapes, and the pair then flee from the base. Upon being picked up by Stratosphere, the Autobots analyze the information they retrieved from the base, and learn that the Decepticons plan to attack Detroit, Michigan, in addition to plotting something code-named "Operation: Pillar", as well as that Megatron is looking for someone known as "Shockwave".

In Detroit, the Decepticons Soundwave and Mixmaster lead a full-scale assault on the city, with the former deploying Lockdown to infiltrate the Autobots' base. While Lockdown uploads a virus created by Mixmaster into the mainframe terminals, Ironhide, the only Autobot in the area, protects some satellite dishes from the Decepticons' troops. Learning that Mixmaster is trying to bring his former teammates back online and to reform Devastator, Ironhide confronts and kills Mixmaster, before fighting Soundwave, who is aided by Starscream. After defeating Soundwave, who retreats, Ironhide is called by Optimus back to the headquarters, just as Lockdown is ordered by Starscream to destroy the controls for the main gate and escape, all the while avoiding Optimus.

After tracking the Decepticons to an abandoned base in Siberia, an Autobot team led by Optimus assaults the base, during which Wheeljack informs Optimus that Megatron is trying to reactivate his primary objective: Shockwave - a deadly Decepticon scientist and assassin. After Mirage takes out the Decepticon's communications and Ironhide destroys the shield protecting the entrance, Megatron orders Soundwave to fight off the Autobots while he reactivates Shockwave. As Soundwave defeats Mirage, who was aided by Stratosphere and flees afterwards, Megatron destroys the coils inside the base to speed up Shockwave's reanimation. Upon awakening, Shockwave tells Megatron that his Energon levels are depleted, so Megatron orders Soundwave to escort him to safety while he fights off the incoming Autobots. Megatron is soon informed that the Driller - a giant worm-beast like robot controlled directly by Shockwave - has been awakened as well, and decides to use it to destroy Optimus, while ordering Starscream and the other Decepticons to leave Siberia.

Megatron defeats Optimus and attempts to escape from the base as well, but is confronted by Ironhide. Against Wheeljack's warnings, Ironhide fights Megatron and defeats him, much to his surprise, as Megatron remarks that he has "a warrior's spirit" and that he will destroy him during their next encounter. Megatron then escapes, as does Ironhide, at Wheeljack's advice, who promises that they'll get Megatron next time. Later, Megatron meets with Starscream, Soundwave, and Shockwave somewhere in South Africa, where he prepares to launch "Operation: Pillar" and orders Shockwave to retrieve a certain ancient Cybertronian artifact from Chernobyl, leading into the events of the film.

== Development ==
High Moon Studios, who previously developed Transformers: War for Cybertron, developed the PlayStation 3 and Xbox 360 versions of the game, while Behaviour Interactive developed the Wii and Nintendo 3DS versions. The first trailer for the game was released on February 12, 2011.

=== Audio ===
Peter Cullen and Jess Harnell reprise their roles as Optimus Prime and Ironhide from the films. Jamie Alcroft replaces George Coe as the voice of Wheeljack. Dave Boat voices Mixmaster, a Decepticon Constructicon who last appeared in Transformers: Revenge of the Fallen. Steve Blum, who voiced Starscream in the animated television series Transformers: Prime, reprises his role as the same character; he replaces Charlie Adler. Blum also voices Crowbar in the DS version.

Multiplayer exclusive characters Warpath, Breakaway, and Air Raid are voiced by Dave Fennoy, Christian Lanz and Rick D. Wasserman, respectively, with Lanz replacing Andrew Kishino, who originally voiced Breakaway in the Revenge of the Fallen video game. Nolan North portrays Major Reynolds. Isaac C. Singleton Jr. voices Decepticons Soundwave and Shockwave (Wii and Nintendo 3DS only). Hugo Weaving nor Frank Welker did not reprise their roles as Megatron, with Fred Tatasciore instead voicing him and Ratchet (replacing Robert Foxworth), Sideswipe and Bumblebee. Travis Willingham voices non-player boss Stratosphere. Dave Wittenberg, who would later go on to voice Wildbreak in the 2015 animated series Transformers: Robots in Disguise, replaces Francesco Quinn as the voice of Mirage.

The original music score for the PlayStation 3 and Xbox 360 versions of the game was composed by Jeff Broadbent. The game soundtrack released on iTunes and Amazon in November 8, 2011.

== Reception ==
Reception

Aggregate score
Aggregator	Score
Metacritic	(X360) 59/100 (PS3) 57/100 (Wii) 34/100 (3DS) 30/100

Review scores
Publication	Score
Destructoid	5.5/10
Eurogamer	5/10
Game Informer	7.5/10
GamePro	3.5/5
GameSpot	5/10
GameTrailers	7/10
GameZone	7/10
IGN	6/10
Joystiq	2/5
Official Xbox Magazine (US)	6.5/10

=== Xbox 360 and PlayStation 3 versions ===
The title has received mixed reviews, with a score of 59 and 57 for the Xbox 360 and PlayStation 3 versions on Metacritic. GameZone gave the 360 and PS3 version a 7, stating "Transformers: Dark of the Moon is a perfectly fine, if short, adaptation of the Transformers film. The characters are likable, and the different vehicle types work beautifully." IGN gave the Xbox 360 and PS3 version a 6.0 of 10. Praising the ideas but criticizing the game as a whole. GameSpot gave 5.5 of 10. They praised the transformation abilities but criticized the bad graphics, strange vehicle physics and brief campaign.

Joystiq gave the title a bad rating of 2 out of 5 stars, criticizing the game because it feels half-finished. Destructoid gave the title a 5.5 out of 10 rating, stating that the title is better than most movie video games, but feels like a rushed movie tie-in. The Official Xbox Magazine awarded the title a 6.5 out of 10 rating, praising the controls, stealth force mode but criticized the last levels of the game and the multiplayer component. GamePro gave the title a 3.5 out of 5 star rating. They praised the good graphics, voice acting and variety of transformers for each mission but criticized the story, vehicle physics, multiplayer mode and the repetitive melee combat. GameTrailers gave the title a 7 out of 10 rating, stating that "Dark of the Moon provides plenty of popcorn thrills that you'll likely forget as soon as the credits begin rolling. Judged against other movie games, it's actually pretty good; next to last year's superior entry, however, it looks a bit like a tin can." Game Informer gave the title a 7.5 out of 10 rating, Stating that anybody who played Transformers: War for Cybertron should enjoy this title. Eurogamer gave the title a low rating of 5 out of 10, stating that the title doesn't have enough polish as War for Cybertron had received and High Moon Studios should've been given more time.

=== Wii and Nintendo 3DS versions ===
Wii and Nintendo 3DS versions of the game received negative reviews, scoring 34 and 30 on Metacritic.
