= The Fourth King =

2006 German, Swiss and Swedish film

- Directed by: Michael Ekbladh; Ted Sieger
- Written by: John Chambers
- Produced by: Alexandra Schatz (executive producer); John Sullivant (executive producer)
- Release date: 21 December 2006
- Running time: 26 minutes
- Countries: Germany, Switzerland, Sweden
- Language: English

The Fourth King (German: Der vierte König) is a 2006 German / Swiss / Swedish film directed by Michael Ekbladh and Ted Sieger.

== Plot summary ==
Three wise kings follow a star to Bethlehem to visit a new born baby. This film narrates the story of the fourth king, Mazzel, and his camel, Chamberlin, the only inhabitants of a tiny kingdom.

Seeing the Star of Bethlehem in the sky, Mazzel and Chamberlin set out to join the other three kings, taking with them the royal cloak, the royal star map and the royal star crystal. On the way, however, they get stuck in a sandstorm, and are forced to turn back to help return a lost nomad girl to her parents, leaving the royal cloak with her. Finding a note from the three kings (who were unable to wait for much longer), Mazzel and Chamberlin set out after them.

Running into a group of lost merchants, Mazzel uses his star map to help them find their way out of the desert, then gives them the map so they won't lose their way again. Stopping for a break, the duo find a small plant and give it some water, causing it to bloom and drop a strange fruit into Mazzel's hand. Resuming the journey, they come across a large wall, and are horrified to find that it is being built by children, the slaves of a greedy rich man. Taken prisoner, Mazzel offers the star crystal in exchange for their freedom, but is informed that it will only pay for the freedom of himself and Chamberlin. Unwilling to abandon the children, the duo set to work helping to build the wall. Luckily, the strange fruit from the plant starts glowing, helping the group to escape.

Continuing on their way, Mazzel and Chamberlin come across a group of shepherds, who inform them that King Herod has ordered that all newborn babies be killed in case one of them is the newborn King of Kings. The duo then run into a man and woman with a baby, and hide with them. Seeing the soldiers approaching, Mazzel and Chamberlin run out to distract them, enabling the couple to escape with the baby. They are then rescued by the other three kings, unbeknownst to them.

Arriving at the stable where the King of Kings is supposed to be, Mazzel is dismayed to find it empty, but a mysterious voice then speaks to him, telling him that whenever he helped someone on his journey, he was helping God, and that God will be with him forever. Mazzel and Chamberlin encounter the children again and settle down to a new life as shepherds, raising the children themselves.

== Cast ==
- Kevin Whately as Narrator

== Critical reception ==
The film was honored at the 5th Festival of European Animated Feature Films and TV Specials, where it was awarded the Special Mention of Jury.
