= Jamie Alcroft =

American comedian and voice actor

- Born: January 18, 1949 (age 77); Youngstown, Ohio, United States
- Education: Ohio University (B.S., Communication, 1971)
- Spouse: Sarah Kawahara
- Children: 3, including Hayley

Comedy career
- Years active: 1978–present
- Medium: Stand-up, television
- Website: www.mackandjamie.com

Jamie Alcroft (born January 18, 1949) is an American comedian and voice actor known for his voice-over work in movies, TV shows and video games and was half of the comedy duo Mack & Jamie.

== Biography ==
=== Early life and education ===
Alcroft is of English, Welsh, Irish and German ancestry. He earned a Bachelor of Science in Communication from Ohio University in 1971.

=== Career ===
Alcroft was working as a disc jockey at a Key West radio station in 1979 when cartoonist Mack Dryden left a note for him at his studio. It read "You must be one of the funniest men in Key West; I'm the other one." The pair got to know one another and began performing as a stand-up act in Key West.

They had been working together for less than two years when they were invited to appear on The Tonight Show Starring Johnny Carson. That and other TV appearances led to their own syndicated show in 1985, called Comedy Break. They taped 125 half-hour shows in less than a year. Their appearance on The Tonight Show with Jay Leno, prompted Leno to call them, "The funniest Duo working today." Mack and Jamie continue to perform at corporate events around the world and have earned the reputation as clean comedians.

As a voice actor, Alcroft has provided numerous voices for animated series, commercials and video games such as Return to Castle Wolfenstein, Gears of War I, II, III and IV and Call of Duty: United Offensive as Lieutenant Lehmkuhl and Sgt. Ramirez. He voiced Wheeljack in the video game adaptation of Transformers: Dark Of The Moon and Adam Sandler's Eight Crazy Nights. He also played the voice as the interviewer from the intro and epilogue of Spyro the Dragon and other numerous dragons. Alcroft also voiced Dr. Dean in Scooby-Doo! and the Witch's Ghost.

He was named 2009 Westlake Village Citizen of the Year and has been voted one of the "25 Most Influential People" in Ventura County. He has dedicated his life to raising funds for schools and charities, through local businesses partners.

He has teamed up with Phil Proctor of Firesign Theatre fame to write and perform "Boomers on a Bench" which can be seen on YouTube and Facebook weekly.

=== Marriage and children ===
Alcroft is married to two-time Emmy award-winning figure skating choreographer Sarah Kawahara. The couple have three children: Alysse, Hayley and Thatcher.

=== Personal life ===
In 2017, Alcroft had a heart transplant.

== Filmography ==
=== Film ===
Year	Title	Role	Notes
1982	All Night Radio	Jamie	Television film
1987	Million Dollar Mystery	Bob	
1996	Edith Ann's Christmas (Just Say Noël)	Loutrek	Voice, television film
1999	Scooby-Doo! and the Witch's Ghost	Dr. Dean	Voice, direct-to-video; uncredited
2002	Eight Crazy Nights	Eli Wolstan	Voice
2003	Shrink Rap	Party Guest	
2007	Corpus Callosum	Randy	
2009	The Buffalo Sam	Yusuf Islam	

=== Television ===
Year	Title	Role	Notes
1985	Comedy Break	Himself	
1990	Open House	Robin Leach	Episode: "First Impressions"
1999	Arli$$		Episode: "The Changing of the Guard"
1999	Rocket Power	Rhino	Voice, episode: "Twister's Cuz / Big Thursday"
1999	Katie Joplin	Mr. Kosloff	Episode: "Parent Trap"
2002	Rugrats	Toby Turtle / Customer	Voice, episode: "Cynthia Comes Alive / Trading Phil"
2003	Most Extreme Elimination Challenge	Voice Actor	Voice, episode: "Meat Handlers and Cartoon Voice Actors"
2003	Primetime Glick	Reporter	Episode: "Chris Elliot"
2005	Justice League Unlimited	Vance / Esposito / Larry	Voice, 2 episodes
2005	Avatar: The Last Airbender	Additional voices	Episode: "The Blue Spirit"
2015	Rogues of LA	Prof. Gardner	Episode: "She's a Witness in a Mafia Murder Trial"

=== Video games ===
Year	Title	Role	Notes
1998	Spyro the Dragon	Lateef, Interviewer, Tomas, Alvar, Cosmos	
2000	Star Trek: Klingon Academy	Civil War Weapons Officer / Freighter Captain 2 / Altair Star Captain / Soorex	
2001	Star Wars: Galactic Battlegrounds	AT-PT Driver / Javelin Submarine Captain / Sio Bibble	
2001	Return to Castle Wolfenstein	Jack Stone, Additional voices	
2003	Quest for Saddam	Saddam's Double / Tom Brokaw / Popeye / Shawn Connery	
2003	Alter Echo	Stome	
2004	Call of Duty: United Offensive	Lt. Lemhkul, Sgt. Ramirez, Additional voices	
2004	EverQuest II	Frum Zoomly / Torlig the Alchemist / Sir Laughlin	
2005	Doom 3: Resurrection of Evil	Additional voices	
2006	Gears of War	Victor Hoffman	
2008	Gears of War 2	Victor Hoffman	
2011	Transformers: Dark of the Moon	Wheeljack, additional voices	
2011	Gears of War 3	Victor Hoffman	
2011	Star Wars: The Old Republic	Admiral Shai / Councillor Jalta / Gavon Kroan / General Durant / Master Cerik / Rinnas Edu / Warden Playt	
2012	Ninja Gaiden 3	LOA Chairman	
2015	Minecraft: Story Mode	Otto	
2016	Gears of War 4	Victor Hoffman	
