= Transformers: Rise of the Dark Spark =

2014 video game

- North American cover art, featuring (from left to right) Lockdown, Grimlock, Optimus Prime, Megatron, and Shockwave
- Developers: Edge of Reality (PC, consoles); WayForward Technologies (3DS)
- Publisher: Activision
- Directors: Brody Brooks; Adam Tierney (3DS)
- Producers: Andy Owen (PC, consoles); Shannon Hatakeda (3DS)
- Designers: Dominic Craig (PC, consoles); Brody Brooks; Adam Tierney; Barrett Velia (3DS)
- Programmers: Emanuel Masciarelli (PC, consoles); Daniel Yoon (3DS)
- Artists: Ewan Wan Woo Lee; William M. Sullivan (PC, consoles); Paul Castillo (3DS)
- Writers: Andy Schmidt (PC, consoles); Adam Tierney (3DS)
- Composers: Jeff Broadbent; Steve Jablonsky; Bobby Tahouri; Troels Brun Folmann
- Series: Transformers
- Engine: Unreal Engine 3 (PC, consoles)
- Platforms: Microsoft Windows; Nintendo 3DS; PlayStation 3; PlayStation 4; Wii U; Xbox 360; Xbox One
- Release: NA: June 24, 2014; AU: June 25, 2014; EU: June 27, 2014
- Genres: Third-person shooter, Strategy, role-playing (3DS)
- Modes: Single-player, multiplayer

Transformers: Rise of the Dark Spark is a video game based on the Transformers franchise, developed by Edge of Reality and WayForward, and published by Activision. It is the third and final entry in the Cybertron series, following War for Cybertron and Fall of Cybertron, and acts as a spin-off and crossover with the live-action Transformers films.

One portion of the game takes place in the timeline divergent from the one where the films take place, serving as an alternative to the events of Age of Extinction, and follows the Autobots as they try to retrieve a Cybertronian artifact called the Dark Spark from the mercenary Lockdown. The other portion, set between the first two Cybertron games, depicts the Decepticons' attempts to use the Dark Spark to win the war against the Autobots, and the latter's efforts to stop them.

The game was developed primarily by Edge of Reality, with the Nintendo 3DS version developed by WayForward Technologies. It was published by Activision and released worldwide in June 2014 for Microsoft Windows, Nintendo 3DS, PlayStation 3, PlayStation 4, Wii U, Xbox 360, and Xbox One. Rise of the Dark Spark received mixed-to-negative reviews from critics, though the 3DS version received better reviews.

== Gameplay ==
The console and Microsoft Windows versions of Transformers: Rise of the Dark Spark are a third-person shooter, much like the High Moon Studios-developed predecessors Transformers: War for Cybertron, Transformers: Fall of Cybertron, and Transformers: Dark of the Moon. The gameplay of Rise of the Dark Spark is therefore similar to the aforementioned titles: players control each Transformer in both its robot and vehicle forms across a set of missions that take place in the cinematic and Aligned universes, the latter taking place before Fall of Cybertron. Instead of a traditional health system, the game features a system similar to the Halo series of video games where all characters have both a regenerating shield and health, the latter of which can be replenished by a health pack or, in multiplayer, being healed by other players' weaponry. The game features various challenges which reward the players with weapon upgrades, characters for the multiplayer component, and other bonuses. Upgrades for weapons can be purchased through Teletran 1 kiosks found throughout the game. A feature returning from previous titles is "Stealth Force", where the player can fire a vehicle's weaponry while in that mode at the cost of their movement speed. Every character has their own unique ability: for example, Soundwave can summon his minions, Optimus Prime has a shield to block incoming fire, Sharpshot can turn invisible for a few seconds, and the Combaticons have the ability to combine into the massive Decepticon Bruticus. The Autobot Grimlock, who transforms into a dinosaur, is controlled differently from other characters: he carries only melee weapons (though he can shoot fire out of his mouth when in dinosaur form), and is much larger than other characters, in addition to having more health points.

The 3DS version of the game is a strategy game role-playing video game. Melee combat is turn-based. The player is given three rounds to deplete their opponent's health. If successful, the enemy is removed from the overworld map. The player can choose from seven different attacks, each with their own recharge time after each use.

=== Multiplayer ===
The console and PC versions of Transformers: Rise of the Dark Spark retains the Cybertron titles' "Escalation" online multiplayer mode. In "Escalation", four players fend off waves of increasingly tough enemies, returned with the addition of upgradable defenses. The mode features over forty playable characters, and has levels based on both Cybertron and Earth. Experience points collected by players are shared between the single-player and multiplayer modes. The Escalation mode is absent in the Wii U and 3DS versions of the game.

== Synopsis ==
=== Setting ===
Transformers: Rise of the Dark Spark is a crossover with the Transformers film franchise and the Cybertron video game series, the latter consisting of Transformers: War for Cybertron and Transformers: Fall of Cybertron. The eponymous Dark Spark is a powerful artifact that is capable of ripping holes in dimensions, which brings two Transformers universes together. The Cybertron universe component of the game takes place before the events of Fall of Cybertron, while its film series universe component takes place on Earth in 2014, continuing Transformers: Dark of the Moon and ignoring Transformers: Age of Extinction while implementing specific elements from it, like Optimus Prime and Bumblebee's new Earth vehicle modes, Drift's appearance, and Lockdown, who is alive. The story consists of fourteen chapters, six (Ch 1, 10-14) of which are set on Earth and eight (Ch 2–9) on Cybertron.

=== Characters ===
Autobots
Air Raid^{b}; Bumblebee (Cybertron^{b}^{d}/Earth^{a}^{b}); Cliffjumper^{b}^{d}; Drift^{a}^{b}; Grimlock (Cybertron^{b}/Earth^{a}); Hound^{b}	Ironhide^{b}^{d}; Jazz^{b}^{d}; Jetfire^{a}^{b}; Optimus Prime (Cybertron^{a}^{b}/Earth^{a}^{b}/G1^{b}^{d}); Perceptor^{b}; Ratchet^{b}	Scattershot^{b}; Sideswipe^{a}^{b}; Silverbolt^{b}; Slug^{b}^{e}; Snarl^{b}	Swoop^{b}; Ultra Magnus^{b}; Warpath^{b}; Wheeljack^{b}; Zeta Prime^{b}
Decepticons
Blast Off^{b}^{d}; Brawl^{b}^{d}; Breakdown^{b}; Bruticus^{a}; Dead End^{b}^{d}; Demolishor^{b}; Drag Strip^{b}	Hardshell^{b}^{d}; Kickback^{b}^{d}; Laserbeak^{d}; Lockdown^{b}^{d}; Megatron^{b}^{d}; Onslaught^{b}^{d}	Quake^{b}; Rumble^{d}; Sharpshot^{a}^{b}; Shockwave^{a}^{b}; Skywarp^{b}^{f}; Soundwave^{a}^{b}	Starscream^{b}^{d}; Stinger^{b}^{f}; Swindle^{a}^{b}; Thundercracker^{b}^{f}; Trypticon^{d}; Vortex^{b}^{d}

^aPlayable in campaign
^bPlayable in escalation
^dAppears in campaign, but is non-playable
^eSlag was renamed Slug in the game due to Slag being a derogatory term in some cultures
^fOriginally available via pre-order, later downloadable content

=== Plot ===
Some time after Lockdown's arrival on Earth, (Note: As depicted in Transformers: Age of Extinction (2014).) the Autobots Optimus Prime, Bumblebee, and Drift investigate the site of a mysterious crash in an abandoned city, encountering a large group of Cybertronian mercenaries led by Lockdown. At the crash site, they find a Cybertronian relic known as the Dark Spark, but before they can retrieve it, Lockdown takes it for himself and uses it to temporarily freeze them in time. A distraught Optimus, saying that the day had "finally come," watches Lockdown escape. He explains what the Dark Spark is: a powerful relic of unknown origins, believed to be the antithesis of the Autobot Matrix of Leadership. Whereas the Matrix grants wisdom, the Dark Spark gives the user the power to bend the universe and its inhabitants to their own will.

Some time after the defeat of Trypticon at Cybertron in another universe, (Note: As depicted in the video game Transformers: War for Cybertron (2010).) Megatron announces that the Decepticons are close to defeating the Autobots and conquering Cybertron, and dispatches Starscream, Soundwave, and Shockwave to find the Dark Spark in the abandoned Crystal City. During their search, the Decepticons are attacked by a swarm of Insecticons led by Hardshell, Kickback and Sharpshot. Shockwave defeats the trio, earning their fealty and control of the Insecticons. With their help, the Decepticons find the Dark Spark, but before they can retrieve it, the Autobots Sideswipe and Ironhide grab it and run away. Pursued by Insecticons, they regroup with Optimus and Bumblebee at a train station, where they must fight off hordes of Insecticons and Starscream until the next train arrives. The Autobots manage to escape, but Shockwave destroys the train using hidden explosives.

Shockwave and Sharpshot defeat Ironhide to reclaim the Dark Spark, but while attempting to reunite with the other Decepticons, they are ambushed by the Autobots. After escaping from them, the pair meet up with the Combaticons Onslaught, Vortex, and Swindle, the latter of whom helps them safely deliver the Dark Spark to Kaon, the Decepticons' capital city. Along the way, they are again ambushed by the Autobots, including Cliffjumper, but manage to defeat them. Jazz subsequently leads an Autobot siege on the gates of Kaon, but the Combaticons combine to form Bruticus and repel the attack. Cliffjumper is taken prisoner after unsuccessfully trying to destroy Bruticus with an explosive.

Optimus and Jazz lead a secret mission to retrieve the Dark Spark and rescue Cliffjumper, but after finding the latter, all three become caught in a virtually inescapable trap. Optimus contacts Perceptor, who sends Jetfire to infiltrate the ruins of the massive Decepticon Trypticon. Despite an encounter with a Decepticon salvage team led by Starscream, Jetfire is able to use Trypticon's laser array to free Optimus, Jazz, and Cliffjumper, and then escape. While Jazz escorts the wounded Cliffjumper to safety, Optimus confronts Megatron, who uses the Dark Spark in combination with Dark Energon to revive several dead Autobots as mindless drones. Optimus defeats Megatron and uses the Matrix of Leadership to send the Dark Spark into deep space, but this injures both of them. While Shockwave carries Megatron away to safety, Optimus contacts Jazz to tell him that the Dark Spark is gone and they can advance with their plan to leave Cybertron via the Ark.

Back on Earth, the Autobots track Lockdown to a jungle, with Bumblebee and Drift being sent to scout ahead and find the mercenaries' stronghold. After Drift is captured, Bumblebee rescues him, but the pair are soon overwhelmed by enemy forces. They are saved by the sudden appearance of Grimlock, who helps them defeat the mercenaries, though Lockdown escapes once again. After learning Lockdown is heading to an underground military base in another abandoned city, the Autobots go there to confront him, but only Optimus, Bumblebee, and Drift enter the bunker, as Grimlock is forced to stay behind to defend the entrance. The trio discover Lockdown is building a Time Bridge to prevent the Autobots from winning the battle of Chicago (Note: As depicted in Transformers: Dark of the Moon (2011)) and bring the Autobot-Decepticon war into the present for personal gain. The Autobots destroy it while Optimus confronts Lockdown. With Drift's help, Optimus separates Lockdown from the Dark Spark and throws the latter into the Time Bridge, sending it to an unknown point in time. The Autobots and Lockdown escape moments before the Time Bridge explodes, vowing to meet again.

In an epilogue scene, the G1 continuity Optimus sees the Dark Spark crashing on Earth and is also distraught, also saying that the day had "finally come".

== Development ==
The Windows and console versions of Transformers: Rise of the Dark Spark are powered by Epic Games' Unreal Engine 3 and utilize the Havok physics engine. Unlike Fall of Cybertron and War for Cybertron, which were developed by High Moon Studios, primary development for Rise of the Dark Spark was handled by Edge of Reality. WayForward Technologies developed the Nintendo 3DS version of the game, which unlike its counterparts is a strategy RPG.

The game acts as a crossover between Transformers: Fall of Cybertron (2012) and the then-recently released film Transformers: Age of Extinction (2014). While the Cybertron segments line up with the events of Fall of Cybertron, the depiction of the events on Earth directly contradict the events depicted in Age of Extinction. Owing to the nature of the game's narrative, several characters have multiple models to choose from, each related to a given continuity. For example, Autobots Bumblebee and Grimlock feature two separate playable character models, one from the War for Cybertron continuity, and one from the cinematic universe. Optimus Prime features two separate character models from these continuities, plus a Transformers: Generation 1 model.

Several veteran voice actors voice multiple characters. Peter Cullen reprises his long-time role as Optimus Prime. Of his experience provided voice work for the game, Cullen said "there was a such a respect for the character from the beginning. I wasn't used to that, it's something that's transformed—pardon the pun—over the years." Fred Tatasciore also returns to voice Megatron. Jim Ward voices Perceptor, Scott Whyte voices Hardshell, and Travis Willingham voices Onslaught and Sideswipe. Troy Baker voices Jazz, Jetfire, and Kickback. Gregg Berger voices Grimlock and Lockdown. Steve Blum provides the voices for Sharpshot, Shockwave, and Swindle. Nolan North voices Bruticus and Cliffjumper. Keith Silverstein voices Blast Off and Rumble. Soundwave is voiced by Isaac C. Singleton Jr. Vortex is voiced by Dave Boat. Sam Riegel reprises his role of Starscream from Transformers: War for Cybertron. Keith Szarabajka voices Ironhide.

A trailer for Rise of the Dark Spark featured American rock band Linkin Park's single "Until It's Gone".

The game was released in 2014 for Microsoft Windows, Nintendo 3DS, PlayStation 3, PlayStation 4, Wii U, Xbox 360, and Xbox One in North America on June 24, in Australia on June 25, and in Europe on June 27. It was the first game to use the PlayStation 4 Pre-Load feature, which allows players to download a game before its release date and have it ready to play the day it is released.

== Reception ==
Reception

Aggregate scores
Aggregator	Score
GameRankings	49.80% (PC); 44.29% (PS4); 30.00% (WIIU); 60.00% (3DS); 44.75% (X360); 59.00% (XONE)
Metacritic	48/100 (PC); 44/100 (PS4); 48/100 (X360); 48/100 (XONE)

Review scores
Publication	Score
Eurogamer	5/10
Game Informer	5/10
GameSpot	4/10
IGN	4.0/10
Official Xbox Magazine (US)	5/10

The console and Windows versions of Transformers: Rise of the Dark Spark, developed by Edge of Reality, received unfavourable reviews from critics. Approval ratings for this version averaged between 60.00% and 30.00% at GameRankings, while Metacritic reports scores in the 40s. IGN gave it a "bad" rating of 4.0 out of 10.0, due to "dull" and "bland" design, a "complex" story, and the total absence of multiplayer support on Wii U. The Nintendo 3DS version, developed by WayForward Technologies, received better reviews with a GameRankings score of 60.00% and no Metacritic score reported.
