= Four Souls of Coyote =

2023 animated film

- Promotional release poster
- Hungarian: Kojot négy lelke
- Directed by: Áron Gauder
- Written by: Géza Bereményi; Áron Gauder
- Produced by: Réka Temple
- Edited by: Áron Gauder
- Music by: Joanne Shenandoah; Ulali; Northern Cree
- Animation by: Zsolt Baumgartner
- Color process: Color
- Production company: Cinemon Entertainment
- Distributed by: Vertigo Media
- Release date: 16 March 2023 (Hungary)
- Running time: 100 minutes
- Country: Hungary
- Language: Hungarian

Four Souls of Coyote (Hungarian: Kojot négy lelke) is a 2023 Hungarian animated adventure drama film directed by Áron Gauder, who co-wrote the film with Géza Bereményi. Set in the present day, the film shows Native American protesters confronting the crew of an oil pipeline project, just down the hill from the land of their ancestors, and highlights the pressing need to live in harmony with the environment. It was released in Hungarian cinemas on 16 March 2023 by Vertigo Media.

Four Souls of Coyote was selected as the Hungarian entry for the Best International Feature Film at the 96th Academy Awards. On December 7, it appeared in the eligible list for consideration for the 2024 Oscars, but it did not make it to the shortlist.

== Story outline ==
Set in the present day, the scenario features Native American protesters confronting the crew of an oil pipeline project near their ancestral land. The grandfather shares an ancient tale of their Creation myth, reminding humans that the challenges facing humanity are universal and that they need to find their place in the great circle of creation. The film has tagline: "Nothing is eternal but the Earth and the mountains".

The story highlights that humans are just a small part of creation, and that destroying Earth because we think we are special is self-damaging. The story is a clarion call to act, to correct course before it's too late.

The story filled with adventures featuring animals, magic, hunger, greed, and the sacred circle of all creations, gives us hope that it is not too late to save Earth.

== Voice cast ==
Role	Hungarian voice	English dub
Old Creator	János Papp	Lorne Cardinal
Grandpa	János Papp	Lorne Cardinal
Coyote	Péter Bozsó	Diontae Black
Man (16–50 years old)	Tamás Széles	Danny Kramer
Sanders	Tamás Széles	Danny Kramer
Woman (16–50 years old)	Gerda Pikali	Stephanie Novak
Mataoka	Gerda Pikali	Priscilla Landham
Boy (2–9 years old)	Bálint Vida	David Mattle
Girl (2–9 years old)	Sára Vida	Lily Rose Silver
Duck	Péter Scherer	Bill Farmer
Raccoon	Péter Vida	Bill Farmer
Buffalo	Róbert Bolla	Cle Bennett
Commander	Róbert Bolla	Cle Bennett
Wolf	Álmos Előd	Cle Bennett
Eagle	Armand Kautzky	Bob Klein
Chancellor	Áron Gauder	Bob Klein
CEO	Áron Gauder	Bob Klein
Lightning	Csaba Debreczeny	John Bentley
Mountain lion	Barnabás Szabó Sipos	John Bentley
Grandson	uncredited	John Bentley
Bear	Zoltán Schneider	Fred Tatasciore
Captain	András Faragó	Fred Tatasciore
Lawyer	András Faragó	Fred Tatasciore
Antelope	uncredited	Fred Tatasciore
Opossum	uncredited	Fred Tatasciore
Gloria	Luca Kis-Kovács	Karin Anglin

== Production ==
Áron Gauder began working on the film in 2017 with Cinemon and producer Réka Temple. In February 2022, first photos from the animated film showing the creation story of the Native Americans were published. By May 2022, 95% animation was completed. The film was shot in 2D animation with audio in 5.1/stereo format.

=== Music ===
The music and songs are composed by Joanne Shenandoah, Mariee Siou, Session Voices, Ulali, and Northern Cree.

== Release ==
The film was released in Hungary on 16 March 2023. In April, it competed in Arizona International Film Festival and was screened on 28 April 2023. It was also selected at the Annecy International Animation Film Festival in Feature competition, where it won Jury Award and at the 25th Shanghai International Film Festival, where it won Golden Goblet for Best Animation Film on 18 June 2023. At the Kecskemét Animation Film Festival it was screened on 25 June as winner of Grand Prize.

It was screened in Anima't section at the 56th Sitges Film Festival in October 2023. The film was shown at the Hungarian Film Festival of Los Angeles on October 28, 2023. It opened the Red Nation Film Festival on 3 November 2023.

It was reported on 6 June 2023, that Gebeka International, a France based sales company, has taken the sales rights of the film.

== Reception ==
Wendy Ide review for ScreenDaily gave positive views and opined, "With its emphasis on mythic storytelling and its elegant, stylised graphic approach, the film could connect with a similar audience to that of Cartoon Saloon’s forays into Irish folkloric fantasy: The Song of the Sea, The Secret of Kells and Wolfwalkers." Ide felt that by framing the beauty of nature in every frame and "using a striking blend of 2D and 3D animation and a strong graphic style pleasingly reminiscent of the work of mid-century artist Charley Harper, the film is a timely reminder of the importance of living harmoniously with the natural world." Fabien Lemercier reviewing for Cineuropa highlighted the theme of the film with the quote placed at the beginning of the film, "Only when the last tree has died, the last river has been poisoned and the last fish has been caught will we realise that we can't eat money." Concluding Lemercier wrote, "Four Souls of Coyote is both simple and subtly sophisticated, both narratively and visually," Lemercier added, "[it is] a mystical ode to nature that rightly reminds us that 'man does not weave the web of life. He is only a strand of it'".

== Accolades ==
In addition to the selection of the film as the Hungarian entry for the Best International Feature Film at the 96th Academy Awards, it won Golden Goblet Award for Best Animation Film at the Shanghai International Film Festival.

Award	Date	Category	Recipient	Result	Ref.
Arizona International Film Festival	28 April 2023	Special Jury Award for Innovative Animation	Four Souls of Coyote	Won	
Třeboň Anifilm	17 May 2023	The Liberec Region Audience Award	Four Souls of Coyote	Won	
New Media Film Festival	5 June 2023	Grand Prize	Four Souls of Coyote	Won	
Annecy International Animation Film Festival	17 June 2023	Jury Award	Four Souls of Coyote	Won	
Annecy International Animation Film Festival	17 June 2023	Cristal for a Feature Film	Four Souls of Coyote	Nominated	
Shanghai International Film Festival	18 June 2023	Golden Goblet Award for Best Animation Film	Four Souls of Coyote	Won	
Kecskemét Animation Film Festival	25 June 2023	Grand Prize	Four Souls of Coyote	Won	
Kecskemét Animation Film Festival	25 June 2023	Audience Award	Four Souls of Coyote	Won	
Kecskemét Animation Film Festival	25 June 2023	Best European Feature Film	Four Souls of Coyote	Won	
Annie Awards	February 17, 2024	Best Animated Feature — Independent	Four Souls of Coyote	Nominated	

== See also ==
- List of submissions to the 96th Academy Awards for Best International Feature Film
- List of Hungarian submissions for the Academy Award for Best International Feature Film
