= Born to Defence =

1988 Hong Kong film by Jet Li

- Theatrical poster
- Directed by: Jet Li
- Written by: Sze Yeung-Ping; Chit Yi-Kwo
- Produced by: Fu Chi
- Starring: Jet Li
- Cinematography: Cho Him
- Edited by: Lee Yuk-wai; Koo Chi-wai
- Music by: Hau Tak-kin; Kui Siu-chung
- Production company: Sil-Metropole Organisation
- Release date: 16 February 1988
- Running time: 92 minutes (HK); 91 minutes (US)
- Country: Hong Kong
- Languages: Cantonese; English
- Box office: US$24.5 million (China & Hong Kong)

Born to Defence (Chinese: 中華英雄) is a 1988 Hong Kong action film, which marked the directorial debut of Jet Li, who also stars in the film. The film features fight choreography by Tsui Siu-Ming. The film is set in China following the end of World War II and the liberation of China. Li stars as an avid athlete who encounters conflicts with American navy sailors, primarily in the boxing ring. The film was a success in China, becoming the second-highest-grossing film of the year.

== Plot ==
Jet (Jet Li) returns to his hometown of Qingdao after fighting the Japanese. He and his fellow soldiers discover that much has changed since the end of the war, and American soldiers are taking all the glory for the victory achieved, and they feel unappreciated. Jet eventually meets with his old friend Zhang (Zhao Erkang), a fellow soldier who saved Jet's life in battle, but was seriously injured with shrapnel. Zhao makes a living as a rickshaw driver. Jet decides to stay at Zhao's house for a while. Jet asks Zhang about his daughter. Zhang replies that she died.

One day, an American Navy Captain named Hans (Kurt Roland Petersson) is driving recklessly through Qingdao's streets, causing a mob to become angry and surround his car. Jet and Hans fight briefly, with Hans being impressed with Jet. The angry mob proceeds to burn his car, causing a riot. Jet and his fellow band of soldiers and rickshaw-drivers retreat during the chaos to a bar, which they discover now caters primarily to foreigners with a boxing ring and is frequented by prostitutes. Jet and his friends are angry at the insults hurled at them by American Navy patrons, which leads to an American soldier named Bailey (Paulo Tocha) challenging Jet to a formal boxing match.

During the match, Jet struggles with only being allowed to use his fists, and frequently breaks the rules due to his ignorance of American boxing. Frustrated, Jet attempts to leave the ring, but Bailey kicks him to prevent him from leaving. Jet continues the fight using both kung-fu and boxing techniques, and even demonstrates that he has finally adapted to boxing and shows superiority over Bailey. Jet wins the fight, along with a lot of money, and the Chinese in the crowd are proud of him.

Later, Bailey and a Chinese prostitute (Song Jia) approach Zhang for a rickshaw ride. The woman is apprehensive around Zhang, and pleads with Bailey to go home. Bailey, furious at Zhang's slow speed and at the fact that the woman keeps staring at Zhang, repeatedly kicks Zhang to make him go faster. Furious, Zhang tips over his rickshaw and insults the woman, causing her to leave in tears. Bailey assaults Zhang, leaving him severely injured. Jet takes over for Zhang's rickshaw. After one of his rickshaw trips, the American soldiers (led by Bailey) deliberately destroy his rickshaw, forcing Jet to take a job at the bar where he fought Bailey the other day. The job requires Jet to be a "sparring partner" for Bailey, where he cannot fight back and must sustain many blows. When Jet initially refuses, the soldiers threaten to beat the bar-owner. Seeing no other way, Jet reluctantly agrees to be Bailey's sparring partner. The prostitute, named Rui (or "Na"), approaches Jet and informs him that the bar-owner was actually a part of the scheme to force Jet to be a sparring partner. Captain Hans attacks Bailey for paying the bar-owner of the scheme, putting a shame to the Navy.

Jet returns to the bar the next day with the intent of fighting back against Bailey (regardless of the consequences to the bar and the bar owner). However, Jet learns that he will be fighting Captain Hans instead. Hans goads Jet into a formal fighting match. The match goes on for a long time, which eventually leads to chaos in the bar as crowds of Chinese and American soldiers fight each other until American soldiers to come and enforce order. The match basically ends in a draw, with Jet barely able to stand. Rui takes Jet to her house, removes his wet clothes to prevent him from catching pneumonia, and helps him rest and recover.

Later, Rui approaches Zhang at the hospital to inform him of what happened to Jet. When he sees that Jet is naked in the bed, he is furious and hits Rui. He reveals to Jet that Rui is his daughter and that he is ashamed of her because she's a prostitute. Jet pleads with him to change his mind about his daughter but Zhang only gets more furious, and angrily tells Jet to find another place to stay.

Later, Jet comes back to Zhang's house, and gleefully tells him that he fell in love with a girl after Zhang kicked him out. However, he asks Zhang for advice: if his new girlfriend is a prostitute, but promises to quit, should he give her a chance? Zhang tells him that he should. Jet then offers to introduce him to his girlfriend right away. The "girlfriend", it turns out, is Rui herself. Zhang is initially angry at Jet and Rui's deception, but Jet makes them reconcile, and they do. While Rui goes out to buy some food and wine, the American soldiers kidnap Rui. Jet and Zhang are informed of this by local rickshaw drivers. While looking for Rui, Jet is confronted by Hans, who wishes to continue the fight from the other night. The Navy soldiers eventually throw both Rui and Zhang off the roof, killing them both. Captain Hans appears shocked and angry at what they've done.

While in jail, Jet is severely beaten by the local police for "causing trouble," and the American soldiers are let go. Jet is furious. Later, he escapes from jail by tying a wet pants and a shoe against two loose bars. He later finds the American soldiers (with Captain Hans and Bailey) driving by a warehouse. Jet sets a trap that forces them to stop. He lights their car on fire with a molotov cocktail and lures them into the warehouse. He severely injures one of the soldiers and ties up another one to the ceiling. Jet then finds Bailey and traps him on a conveyor belt that leads to a furnace, where he burns Bailey to death. Then, he confronts Hans. Hans and Jet fight for a long time. Hans eventually gains the upper hand, but their movements cause the mechanisms of the warehouse to eventually knock a bunch of barrels into Hans. With Hans severely beaten on the ground, Jet picks up an axe, screams, and swings it downward. He chooses to spare Hans. Hans is relieved. Jet walks out of the warehouse where the Chinese policemen were waiting outside and fatally shoots down Jet.

== Cast ==
- Jet Li as Jet
- Zhao Erkang as Zhang
- Song Jia as Na
- Kurt Roland Petersson as Captain Hans
- Paulo Tocha as Bailey
- Yuen Fai as Friend of Jet
- Lam Hak-ming as Policeman
- Cho Wing as Angry Chinese Man
- Dion Lam as Angry Chinese Man
- Ng Kit-keung as Angry Chinese Man
- Mark King as GI Blue
- Dean Harrington as US Marine
- Yuen Kam-fai as Soldier
- Zhang Chun-zhong as Soldier

== Box office ==
In Hong Kong, the film grossed HK$11,456,731 (US$1,467,683), making it the 38th top-grossing film of the year.

The film was a success in China, becoming the second-highest-grossing film of the year. It grossed CN¥80 million (US$21 million) in box office revenue, and sold 97 million tickets in China. This adds up to US$24,468,184 grossed in China and Hong Kong in 1988.

In South Korea, the film sold 782 tickets in the capital city of Seoul.

== See also ==
- Jet Li filmography
- List of Hong Kong films
