= Ted Sieger's Molly Monster =

2016 German animated film

- Poster
- Directed by: Ted Sieger; Matthias Bruhn; Michael Ekbladh
- Screenplay by: John Chambers
- Story by: Ted Sieger
- Based on: Molly Monster by Ted Sieger
- Edited by: Melanie Hartmann
- Music by: Annette Focks
- Release dates: 15 February 2016 (Berlinale); 8 September 2016 (Germany)
- Running time: 72 minutes
- Countries: Germany; Switzerland; Sweden
- Box office: $39,029

Ted Sieger's Molly Monster (German: Ted Sieger's Molly Monster – Der Kinofilm, lit. 'Ted Sieger's Molly Monster – The Movie'; also known as Molly Monster: The Movie (German: Molly Monster – Der Kinofilm) or simply Molly Monster) is a 2016 animated adventure fantasy film directed by Ted Sieger, Matthias Bruhn and Michael Ekbladh from a story by Sieger and screenplay by John Chambers, based on the titular children's TV series.

== Release ==
Ted Sieger's Molly Monster had its world premiere at the 66th Berlin International Film Festival on 15 February 2016, before being released theatrically in Germany on 8 September.
