= Ted Sieger =

Swiss illustrator, director, writer, and producer

Ted Sieger (born 18 May 1958 in Coquimbo, Chile) is a Swiss illustrator, director, writer and producer known for, among others, the animated television series Ted Sieger's Wildlife. In 2007, he was awarded the Special Mention of Jury at the 5th Festival of European Animated Feature Films and TV Specials alongside Michael Ekblad for their work on The Fourth King.

== Filmography ==
- Schneckenmensch (1986)
- Walddebatte (1990)
- Jean-Claude des Alpes (1991)
- Talk To Me (1991)
- Sheep (1993)
- Ted Sieger's Wildlife (TV series, 1999)
- Fast ein Gebet (2002)
- The Fourth King (2005)
- The Little Monsterette (2005)
- Ted Sieger's Molly Monster (TV series, 52 episodes, 2009)
- Molly und das Weihnachtsmonster (2010)
- The Smortlybacks (2013)
- Ted Sieger's Molly Monster (2016)
- The Smortlybacks Come Back! (2022)
