= Meanings of minor-planet names: 221001–222000 =

As minor planet discoveries are confirmed, they are given a permanent number by the IAU's Minor Planet Center (MPC), and the discoverers can then submit names for them, following the IAU's naming conventions. The list below concerns those minor planets in the specified number-range that have received names, and explains the meanings of those names.

Official naming citations of newly named small Solar System bodies are approved and published in a bulletin by IAU's Working Group for Small Bodies Nomenclature (WGSBN). Before May 2021, citations were published in MPC's Minor Planet Circulars for many decades. Recent citations can also be found on the JPL Small-Body Database (SBDB). Until his death in 2016, German astronomer Lutz D. Schmadel compiled these citations into the Dictionary of Minor Planet Names (DMP) and regularly updated the collection.

Based on Paul Herget's The Names of the Minor Planets, Schmadel also researched the unclear origin of numerous asteroids, most of which had been named prior to World War II. This article incorporates text from this source, which is in the public domain: SBDB New namings may only be added to this list below after official publication as the preannouncement of names is condemned. The WGSBN publishes a comprehensive guideline for the naming rules of non-cometary small Solar System bodies.

== 221001–221100 ==
Named minor planet	Provisional	This minor planet was named for...	Ref · Catalog
221019 Raine	2005 PH_{17}	Raine Ann Krecic (born 2011), the granddaughter of American discoverer James Whitney Young	JPL · 221019
221026 Jeancoester	2005 QL_{30}	Jean Coester (born 1939), long-time colleague of the French discoverer Bernard Christophe	JPL · 221026
221073 Ovruch	2005 SE_{1}	Ovruch, the ancient city in northern Ukraine.	JPL · 221073

== 221101–221200 ==
back to top

Named minor planet	Provisional	This minor planet was named for...	Ref · Catalog
221149 Cindyfoote	2005 TG_{61}	Cindy N. Foote (born 1957), an American amateur astronomer who obtained her first telescope on a dare with her husband (see below).	JPL · 221149
221150 Jerryfoote	2005 TQ_{61}	Jerry L. Foote (born 1942), an American amateur astronomer who moved to Utah in the 1990s with his wife, Cindy (see above), where they established the Vermillion Cliffs Observatory (G85) near the border to Arizona.	JPL · 221150

== 221201–221300 ==
back to top

Named minor planet	Provisional	This minor planet was named for...	Ref · Catalog
221230 Sanaloria	2005 US_{158}	Sanaloria is an imaginary planet inhabited by humankind in the future. Developed by David, the son of the discoverer, and his friend Maxime Delorme, the universe of Sanaloria depicts a cynical vision of our species. A video game first, its philosophy still inspires musical, graphical and literary creations.	JPL · 221230

== 221301–221400 ==
back to top

Named minor planet	Provisional	This minor planet was named for...	Ref · Catalog
There are no named minor planets in this number range

== 221401–221500 ==
back to top

Named minor planet	Provisional	This minor planet was named for...	Ref · Catalog
221454 Mayerlambert	2006 BW_{8}	Ferenc Mayer-Lambert (1795–1865), a German astronomer, university professor and director of the Gelléthegy Observatory at Buda.	IAU · 221454
221465 Rapa Nui	2006 BE_{99}	Rapa Nui, the name of Easter Island in the Polynesian Rapanui language	JPL · 221465

== 221501–221600 ==
back to top

Named minor planet	Provisional	This minor planet was named for...	Ref · Catalog
221516 Bergen-Enkheim	2006 PR_{4}	Bergen-Enkheim is the easternmost borough of Frankfurt am Main in Germany	JPL · 221516
221528 Kosztolányi	2006 TG_{10}	Dezső Kosztolányi (1885–1936), Hungarian writer, poet, literary translator, critic, and one of the greatest figures of 20th-century Hungarian prose and lyrics.	JPL · 221528
221529 Tamkósirató	2006 TS_{10}	Károly Tamkó Sirató, Hungarian poet, art theorist, and translator.	IAU · 221529
221566 Omarcustodio	2006 UZ_{325}	Omar S. Custodio (born 1969), American operations manager for New Horizons.	JPL · 221566

== 221601–221700 ==
back to top

Named minor planet	Provisional	This minor planet was named for...	Ref · Catalog
221628 Hyatt	2006 YE_{13}	Hyatt M. Gibbs (born 1938), a professor of optical sciences at the University of Arizona	JPL · 221628
221673 Duschl	2007 DP	Wolfgang J. Duschl (b. 1958), a German physicist and astronomer.	IAU · 221673
221698 Juliusolsen	2007 DQ_{63}	Julius Olsen (1873–?) was Dean of Hardin-Simmons University (Abilene, TX) from 1902 until 1940.	JPL · 221698

== 221701–221800 ==
back to top

Named minor planet	Provisional	This minor planet was named for...	Ref · Catalog
221712 Moléson	2007 EA_{10}	The Moléson, a 2002-metre mountain in the Swiss Prealps, overlooking the region of Gruyeres in the canton of Fribourg.	JPL · 221712
221769 Cima Rest	2007 GQ_{51}	The Cima Rest Observatory is situated in Magasa in a nice and isolated area of the Italian Alps, at an elevation of 1250 meters.	JPL · 221769

== 221801–221900 ==
back to top

Named minor planet	Provisional	This minor planet was named for...	Ref · Catalog
221853 Gábrisgyula	2008 GB	Gyula Gábris (b. 1942), a Hungarian geographer, university professor, and a prominent scientist in geomorphology and Quaternary studies.	IAU · 221853

== 221901–222000 ==
back to top

Named minor planet	Provisional	This minor planet was named for...	Ref · Catalog
221908 Agastrophus	2008 QQ	Agastrophus, who is a Paionian hero in Homer's Iliad, famed for his spear, who fought with the Trojans in the Trojan War and who was killed by Diomedes. Agastrophus was the son of Paeon and brother of Laophoon.	JPL · 221908
221917 Opites	2008 SD_{83}	Opites was a Greek soldier, a ruler of the Danaans, who was killed by Hektor in the battle for Troy.	JPL · 221917
221923 Jayeff	2009 OD_{3}	June F. Falla (born 1945), the wife of British discoverer Norman Falla	JPL · 221923

back to top

Preceded by 220,001–221,000	Meanings of minor-planet names List of minor planets: 221,001–222,000	Succeeded by 222,001–223,000
