= Khitrov =

Khitrov or Khytrov (Хитров in Russian, Ukrainian and Bulgarian, from хитрый = cunning) is a Slavic male surname, its feminine counterpart is Khitrova or Khytrova. It may refer to

- Evhen Khytrov (born 1988), Ukrainian boxer
- Valery Khitrov (born 1941), Russian cyclist
- Galina Khitrova (1959–2016), Russian-American physicist
- Irina Khitrova (born 1953), Bulgarian Olympic gymnast

== See also ==
- Khitruk
- Khitrovka
