= List of minor planets: 221001–222000 =

The following is a partial list of minor planets, running from minor-planet number 221001 through 222000, inclusive. The primary data for this and other partial lists is based on JPL's "Small-Body Orbital Elements" and data available from the Minor Planet Center. Critical list information is also provided by the MPC, unless otherwise specified from Lowell Observatory. A detailed description of the table's columns and additional sources are given on the main page including a complete list of every page in this series, and a statistical break-up on the dynamical classification of minor planets.

Also see the summary list of all named bodies in numerical and alphabetical order, and the corresponding naming citations for the number range of this particular list. New namings may only be added to this list after official publication, as the preannouncement of names is condemned by the Working Group for Small Bodies Nomenclature of the International Astronomical Union.

Near-Earth obj.	MBA (inner)	MBA (outer)	Centaur
Mars-crosser	MBA (middle)	Jupiter trojan	Trans-Neptunian obj.
Unclassified

== 221001–221100 ==
Designation			Discovery			Properties		Ref
Permanent	Provisional	Named after	Date	Site	Discoverer(s)	Category	Diam.	Ref
221001	2005 NE_{83}	—	July 12, 2005	Bergisch Gladbach	W. Bickel	·	1.8 km	MPC · JPL
221002	2005 NV_{90}	—	July 5, 2005	Mount Lemmon	Mount Lemmon Survey	·	1.7 km	MPC · JPL
221003	2005 NH_{93}	—	July 5, 2005	Palomar	NEAT	·	1.9 km	MPC · JPL
221004	2005 NP_{95}	—	July 7, 2005	Kitt Peak	Spacewatch	·	1.3 km	MPC · JPL
221005	2005 NH_{122}	—	July 5, 2005	Mount Lemmon	Mount Lemmon Survey	MAS	900 m	MPC · JPL
221006	2005 OH_{2}	—	July 27, 2005	Reedy Creek	J. Broughton	·	2.3 km	MPC · JPL
221007	2005 OD_{4}	—	July 27, 2005	Palomar	NEAT	·	1.1 km	MPC · JPL
221008	2005 OX_{5}	—	July 28, 2005	Palomar	NEAT	·	1.6 km	MPC · JPL
221009	2005 OM_{9}	—	July 27, 2005	Palomar	NEAT	·	1.8 km	MPC · JPL
221010	2005 OW_{11}	—	July 29, 2005	Palomar	NEAT	·	1.6 km	MPC · JPL
221011	2005 OJ_{13}	—	July 29, 2005	Palomar	NEAT	PHO	1.4 km	MPC · JPL
221012	2005 OH_{18}	—	July 30, 2005	Palomar	NEAT	·	1.8 km	MPC · JPL
221013	2005 OA_{27}	—	July 30, 2005	Palomar	NEAT	·	1.1 km	MPC · JPL
221014	2005 OB_{29}	—	July 30, 2005	Palomar	NEAT	·	1.8 km	MPC · JPL
221015	2005 PJ_{1}	—	August 1, 2005	Siding Spring	SSS	·	1.8 km	MPC · JPL
221016	2005 PW_{1}	—	August 1, 2005	Siding Spring	SSS	·	2.5 km	MPC · JPL
221017	2005 PB_{14}	—	August 4, 2005	Palomar	NEAT	·	1.6 km	MPC · JPL
221018	2005 PV_{14}	—	August 4, 2005	Palomar	NEAT	·	1.8 km	MPC · JPL
221019 Raine	2005 PH_{17}	Raine	August 13, 2005	Wrightwood	J. W. Young	MAS	840 m	MPC · JPL
221020	2005 PS_{20}	—	August 15, 2005	Siding Spring	SSS	·	2.1 km	MPC · JPL
221021	2005 QY_{3}	—	August 24, 2005	Palomar	NEAT	MAS	1.3 km	MPC · JPL
221022	2005 QE_{5}	—	August 22, 2005	Palomar	NEAT	·	1.5 km	MPC · JPL
221023	2005 QK_{19}	—	August 25, 2005	Campo Imperatore	CINEOS	V	1.0 km	MPC · JPL
221024	2005 QP_{19}	—	August 25, 2005	Campo Imperatore	CINEOS	·	1.9 km	MPC · JPL
221025	2005 QA_{21}	—	August 26, 2005	Anderson Mesa	LONEOS	V	1.1 km	MPC · JPL
221026 Jeancoester	2005 QL_{30}	Jeancoester	August 28, 2005	Saint-Sulpice	B. Christophe	·	1.9 km	MPC · JPL
221027	2005 QU_{31}	—	August 24, 2005	Palomar	NEAT	V	950 m	MPC · JPL
221028	2005 QS_{32}	—	August 25, 2005	Palomar	NEAT	·	1.6 km	MPC · JPL
221029	2005 QM_{33}	—	August 25, 2005	Palomar	NEAT	·	2.2 km	MPC · JPL
221030	2005 QO_{42}	—	August 26, 2005	Anderson Mesa	LONEOS	·	1.6 km	MPC · JPL
221031	2005 QV_{42}	—	August 26, 2005	Anderson Mesa	LONEOS	NYS	1.5 km	MPC · JPL
221032	2005 QT_{43}	—	August 26, 2005	Palomar	NEAT	·	1.5 km	MPC · JPL
221033	2005 QU_{52}	—	August 27, 2005	Siding Spring	SSS	MAS	1.2 km	MPC · JPL
221034	2005 QX_{65}	—	August 27, 2005	Anderson Mesa	LONEOS	·	2.0 km	MPC · JPL
221035	2005 QZ_{65}	—	August 27, 2005	Anderson Mesa	LONEOS	·	2.2 km	MPC · JPL
221036	2005 QK_{66}	—	August 27, 2005	Anderson Mesa	LONEOS	·	1.5 km	MPC · JPL
221037	2005 QL_{66}	—	August 27, 2005	Haleakala	NEAT	·	1.8 km	MPC · JPL
221038	2005 QZ_{67}	—	August 28, 2005	Siding Spring	SSS	V	1.0 km	MPC · JPL
221039	2005 QP_{68}	—	August 28, 2005	Siding Spring	SSS	V	1.0 km	MPC · JPL
221040	2005 QE_{71}	—	August 29, 2005	Socorro	LINEAR	·	2.2 km	MPC · JPL
221041	2005 QF_{74}	—	August 29, 2005	Anderson Mesa	LONEOS	·	2.1 km	MPC · JPL
221042	2005 QF_{77}	—	August 24, 2005	Palomar	NEAT	V	1.2 km	MPC · JPL
221043	2005 QC_{82}	—	August 29, 2005	Anderson Mesa	LONEOS	NYS	1.8 km	MPC · JPL
221044	2005 QT_{88}	—	August 29, 2005	St. Véran	St. Veran	MAS	1.2 km	MPC · JPL
221045	2005 QT_{94}	—	August 27, 2005	Palomar	NEAT	·	1.7 km	MPC · JPL
221046	2005 QV_{94}	—	August 27, 2005	Palomar	NEAT	·	2.4 km	MPC · JPL
221047	2005 QZ_{97}	—	August 27, 2005	Palomar	NEAT	·	1.7 km	MPC · JPL
221048	2005 QL_{100}	—	August 27, 2005	Palomar	NEAT	·	1.5 km	MPC · JPL
221049	2005 QA_{110}	—	August 27, 2005	Palomar	NEAT	MAS	1.0 km	MPC · JPL
221050	2005 QT_{111}	—	August 27, 2005	Palomar	NEAT	·	1.9 km	MPC · JPL
221051	2005 QK_{113}	—	August 27, 2005	Palomar	NEAT	·	1.6 km	MPC · JPL
221052	2005 QK_{115}	—	August 27, 2005	Palomar	NEAT	HNS	1.9 km	MPC · JPL
221053	2005 QJ_{118}	—	August 28, 2005	Kitt Peak	Spacewatch	·	1.6 km	MPC · JPL
221054	2005 QC_{127}	—	August 28, 2005	Kitt Peak	Spacewatch	·	1.8 km	MPC · JPL
221055	2005 QM_{130}	—	August 28, 2005	Kitt Peak	Spacewatch	·	1.6 km	MPC · JPL
221056	2005 QG_{133}	—	August 28, 2005	Kitt Peak	Spacewatch	·	1.7 km	MPC · JPL
221057	2005 QV_{135}	—	August 28, 2005	Kitt Peak	Spacewatch	·	1.3 km	MPC · JPL
221058	2005 QU_{142}	—	August 31, 2005	Anderson Mesa	LONEOS	·	2.8 km	MPC · JPL
221059	2005 QD_{143}	—	August 31, 2005	Anderson Mesa	LONEOS	·	2.3 km	MPC · JPL
221060	2005 QJ_{152}	—	August 31, 2005	Kitt Peak	Spacewatch	·	1.9 km	MPC · JPL
221061	2005 QW_{154}	—	August 28, 2005	Siding Spring	SSS	·	1.8 km	MPC · JPL
221062	2005 QX_{160}	—	August 28, 2005	Kitt Peak	Spacewatch	·	2.4 km	MPC · JPL
221063	2005 QY_{161}	—	August 28, 2005	Siding Spring	SSS	·	2.4 km	MPC · JPL
221064	2005 QL_{179}	—	August 25, 2005	Palomar	NEAT	·	1.9 km	MPC · JPL
221065	2005 QP_{187}	—	August 31, 2005	Palomar	NEAT	·	1.5 km	MPC · JPL
221066	2005 RK_{17}	—	September 1, 2005	Kitt Peak	Spacewatch	NYS	1.4 km	MPC · JPL
221067	2005 RJ_{20}	—	September 1, 2005	Palomar	NEAT	MAR	1.6 km	MPC · JPL
221068	2005 RK_{24}	—	September 11, 2005	Anderson Mesa	LONEOS	EUN	2.0 km	MPC · JPL
221069	2005 RF_{30}	—	September 9, 2005	Socorro	LINEAR	·	2.4 km	MPC · JPL
221070	2005 RE_{32}	—	September 13, 2005	Catalina	CSS	JUN	1.8 km	MPC · JPL
221071	2005 RR_{33}	—	September 12, 2005	Kitt Peak	Spacewatch	·	1.6 km	MPC · JPL
221072	2005 SN	—	September 22, 2005	Uccle	T. Pauwels	·	2.3 km	MPC · JPL
221073 Ovruch	2005 SE_{1}	Ovruch	September 23, 2005	Andrushivka	Andrushivka	·	2.2 km	MPC · JPL
221074	2005 SQ_{6}	—	September 23, 2005	Kitt Peak	Spacewatch	·	2.9 km	MPC · JPL
221075	2005 SA_{13}	—	September 24, 2005	Kitt Peak	Spacewatch	·	4.0 km	MPC · JPL
221076	2005 SM_{14}	—	September 25, 2005	Catalina	CSS	·	2.1 km	MPC · JPL
221077	2005 SP_{20}	—	September 24, 2005	Kitt Peak	Spacewatch	·	1.7 km	MPC · JPL
221078	2005 SS_{24}	—	September 24, 2005	Anderson Mesa	LONEOS	·	3.2 km	MPC · JPL
221079	2005 SX_{32}	—	September 23, 2005	Kitt Peak	Spacewatch	(5)	1.6 km	MPC · JPL
221080	2005 SR_{39}	—	September 24, 2005	Kitt Peak	Spacewatch	·	1.7 km	MPC · JPL
221081	2005 SU_{45}	—	September 24, 2005	Kitt Peak	Spacewatch	·	2.1 km	MPC · JPL
221082	2005 SC_{49}	—	September 24, 2005	Kitt Peak	Spacewatch	·	2.6 km	MPC · JPL
221083	2005 SH_{49}	—	September 24, 2005	Kitt Peak	Spacewatch	EUN	1.6 km	MPC · JPL
221084	2005 SX_{49}	—	September 24, 2005	Kitt Peak	Spacewatch	·	1.8 km	MPC · JPL
221085	2005 SK_{50}	—	September 24, 2005	Kitt Peak	Spacewatch	JUN	1.6 km	MPC · JPL
221086	2005 SG_{54}	—	September 25, 2005	Kitt Peak	Spacewatch	(5)	1.5 km	MPC · JPL
221087	2005 SU_{60}	—	September 26, 2005	Kitt Peak	Spacewatch	·	2.5 km	MPC · JPL
221088	2005 SW_{65}	—	September 26, 2005	Catalina	CSS	·	3.5 km	MPC · JPL
221089	2005 SE_{68}	—	September 27, 2005	Kitt Peak	Spacewatch	EUN	1.4 km	MPC · JPL
221090	2005 SZ_{79}	—	September 24, 2005	Kitt Peak	Spacewatch	·	1.6 km	MPC · JPL
221091	2005 SF_{85}	—	September 24, 2005	Kitt Peak	Spacewatch	·	1.4 km	MPC · JPL
221092	2005 SO_{90}	—	September 24, 2005	Kitt Peak	Spacewatch	MIS	2.8 km	MPC · JPL
221093	2005 SM_{91}	—	September 24, 2005	Kitt Peak	Spacewatch	·	2.1 km	MPC · JPL
221094	2005 SN_{94}	—	September 25, 2005	Palomar	NEAT	PHO	2.7 km	MPC · JPL
221095	2005 SK_{96}	—	September 25, 2005	Kitt Peak	Spacewatch	(5)	1.3 km	MPC · JPL
221096	2005 SD_{97}	—	September 25, 2005	Kitt Peak	Spacewatch	(5)	1.4 km	MPC · JPL
221097	2005 SL_{101}	—	September 25, 2005	Kitt Peak	Spacewatch	·	1.6 km	MPC · JPL
221098	2005 SN_{103}	—	September 25, 2005	Catalina	CSS	·	1.6 km	MPC · JPL
221099	2005 SP_{104}	—	September 25, 2005	Kitt Peak	Spacewatch	·	1.6 km	MPC · JPL
221100	2005 SK_{105}	—	September 25, 2005	Kitt Peak	Spacewatch	EUN	1.4 km	MPC · JPL

== 221101–221200 ==
back to top

Designation			Discovery			Properties		Ref
Permanent	Provisional	Named after	Date	Site	Discoverer(s)	Category	Diam.	Ref
221101	2005 SX_{107}	—	September 26, 2005	Kitt Peak	Spacewatch	·	1.8 km	MPC · JPL
221102	2005 SE_{109}	—	September 26, 2005	Kitt Peak	Spacewatch	·	1.4 km	MPC · JPL
221103	2005 SN_{111}	—	September 26, 2005	Kitt Peak	Spacewatch	EUN	1.8 km	MPC · JPL
221104	2005 SC_{125}	—	September 29, 2005	Palomar	NEAT	MAS	980 m	MPC · JPL
221105	2005 SK_{143}	—	September 25, 2005	Kitt Peak	Spacewatch	·	2.7 km	MPC · JPL
221106	2005 SE_{145}	—	September 25, 2005	Kitt Peak	Spacewatch	·	1.1 km	MPC · JPL
221107	2005 SB_{151}	—	September 25, 2005	Kitt Peak	Spacewatch	·	1.9 km	MPC · JPL
221108	2005 SO_{152}	—	September 25, 2005	Palomar	NEAT	·	3.2 km	MPC · JPL
221109	2005 SN_{161}	—	September 27, 2005	Kitt Peak	Spacewatch	·	1.2 km	MPC · JPL
221110	2005 SV_{161}	—	September 27, 2005	Socorro	LINEAR	·	2.1 km	MPC · JPL
221111	2005 SA_{165}	—	September 28, 2005	Palomar	NEAT	·	1.9 km	MPC · JPL
221112	2005 SQ_{169}	—	September 29, 2005	Kitt Peak	Spacewatch	EUN	1.6 km	MPC · JPL
221113	2005 SW_{172}	—	September 29, 2005	Kitt Peak	Spacewatch	·	1.9 km	MPC · JPL
221114	2005 SQ_{189}	—	September 29, 2005	Mount Lemmon	Mount Lemmon Survey	·	1.7 km	MPC · JPL
221115	2005 SF_{194}	—	September 29, 2005	Kitt Peak	Spacewatch	·	2.9 km	MPC · JPL
221116	2005 SW_{196}	—	September 30, 2005	Mount Lemmon	Mount Lemmon Survey	·	1.8 km	MPC · JPL
221117	2005 SE_{217}	—	September 30, 2005	Mount Lemmon	Mount Lemmon Survey	·	2.0 km	MPC · JPL
221118	2005 SL_{218}	—	September 30, 2005	Palomar	NEAT	·	3.1 km	MPC · JPL
221119	2005 SY_{218}	—	September 30, 2005	Siding Spring	SSS	PHO	2.7 km	MPC · JPL
221120	2005 SD_{219}	—	September 30, 2005	Mount Lemmon	Mount Lemmon Survey	·	2.2 km	MPC · JPL
221121	2005 SV_{221}	—	September 27, 2005	Socorro	LINEAR	·	2.3 km	MPC · JPL
221122	2005 SA_{222}	—	September 27, 2005	Palomar	NEAT	EUN	1.5 km	MPC · JPL
221123	2005 SM_{222}	—	September 29, 2005	Siding Spring	SSS	MAR	1.6 km	MPC · JPL
221124	2005 SZ_{224}	—	September 29, 2005	Mount Lemmon	Mount Lemmon Survey	·	2.4 km	MPC · JPL
221125	2005 SM_{231}	—	September 30, 2005	Mount Lemmon	Mount Lemmon Survey	·	1.8 km	MPC · JPL
221126	2005 SW_{233}	—	September 30, 2005	Mount Lemmon	Mount Lemmon Survey	·	1.8 km	MPC · JPL
221127	2005 SB_{236}	—	September 29, 2005	Kitt Peak	Spacewatch	ADE	2.4 km	MPC · JPL
221128	2005 SK_{253}	—	September 23, 2005	Palomar	NEAT	PHO	1.2 km	MPC · JPL
221129	2005 SQ_{259}	—	September 25, 2005	Catalina	CSS	·	2.4 km	MPC · JPL
221130	2005 SX_{263}	—	September 23, 2005	Kitt Peak	Spacewatch	·	1.9 km	MPC · JPL
221131	2005 SA_{270}	—	September 29, 2005	Kitt Peak	Spacewatch	·	3.4 km	MPC · JPL
221132	2005 SG_{275}	—	September 30, 2005	Socorro	LINEAR	(194)	2.7 km	MPC · JPL
221133	2005 SU_{278}	—	September 30, 2005	Mount Lemmon	Mount Lemmon Survey	·	2.1 km	MPC · JPL
221134	2005 SB_{280}	—	September 24, 2005	Kitt Peak	Spacewatch	·	1.9 km	MPC · JPL
221135	2005 SX_{280}	—	September 29, 2005	Catalina	CSS	·	2.3 km	MPC · JPL
221136	2005 SU_{281}	—	September 23, 2005	Kitt Peak	Spacewatch	·	1.7 km	MPC · JPL
221137	2005 SP_{283}	—	September 21, 2005	Apache Point	A. C. Becker	EUN	1.3 km	MPC · JPL
221138	2005 TX_{1}	—	October 1, 2005	Mount Lemmon	Mount Lemmon Survey	·	2.8 km	MPC · JPL
221139	2005 TH_{3}	—	October 1, 2005	Socorro	LINEAR	·	2.6 km	MPC · JPL
221140	2005 TU_{5}	—	October 1, 2005	Catalina	CSS	·	2.9 km	MPC · JPL
221141	2005 TO_{11}	—	October 1, 2005	Mount Lemmon	Mount Lemmon Survey	CLO	2.9 km	MPC · JPL
221142	2005 TP_{12}	—	October 1, 2005	Kitt Peak	Spacewatch	·	1.5 km	MPC · JPL
221143	2005 TP_{19}	—	October 1, 2005	Mount Lemmon	Mount Lemmon Survey	·	1.0 km	MPC · JPL
221144	2005 TU_{19}	—	October 1, 2005	Mount Lemmon	Mount Lemmon Survey	MIS	3.3 km	MPC · JPL
221145	2005 TN_{21}	—	October 1, 2005	Kitt Peak	Spacewatch	·	1.9 km	MPC · JPL
221146	2005 TE_{26}	—	October 1, 2005	Mount Lemmon	Mount Lemmon Survey	·	1.4 km	MPC · JPL
221147	2005 TY_{35}	—	October 1, 2005	Kitt Peak	Spacewatch	·	1.4 km	MPC · JPL
221148	2005 TH_{41}	—	October 2, 2005	Kitt Peak	Spacewatch	·	2.9 km	MPC · JPL
221149 Cindyfoote	2005 TG_{61}	Cindyfoote	October 3, 2005	Catalina	CSS	·	1.8 km	MPC · JPL
221150 Jerryfoote	2005 TQ_{61}	Jerryfoote	October 3, 2005	Catalina	CSS	·	2.4 km	MPC · JPL
221151	2005 TF_{62}	—	October 4, 2005	Mount Lemmon	Mount Lemmon Survey	·	1.2 km	MPC · JPL
221152	2005 TR_{62}	—	October 4, 2005	Mount Lemmon	Mount Lemmon Survey	·	2.4 km	MPC · JPL
221153	2005 TU_{73}	—	October 7, 2005	Anderson Mesa	LONEOS	·	1.8 km	MPC · JPL
221154	2005 TY_{75}	—	October 4, 2005	Palomar	NEAT	·	3.1 km	MPC · JPL
221155	2005 TK_{79}	—	October 8, 2005	Catalina	CSS	·	2.0 km	MPC · JPL
221156	2005 TH_{81}	—	October 3, 2005	Kitt Peak	Spacewatch	·	2.7 km	MPC · JPL
221157	2005 TZ_{91}	—	October 6, 2005	Kitt Peak	Spacewatch	·	2.7 km	MPC · JPL
221158	2005 TD_{101}	—	October 7, 2005	Catalina	CSS	·	2.8 km	MPC · JPL
221159	2005 TD_{105}	—	October 8, 2005	Socorro	LINEAR	·	1.7 km	MPC · JPL
221160	2005 TM_{106}	—	October 10, 2005	Kitt Peak	Spacewatch	·	2.2 km	MPC · JPL
221161	2005 TP_{106}	—	October 4, 2005	Catalina	CSS	·	2.6 km	MPC · JPL
221162	2005 TZ_{107}	—	October 7, 2005	Bergisch Gladbach	W. Bickel	·	1.1 km	MPC · JPL
221163	2005 TU_{113}	—	October 7, 2005	Kitt Peak	Spacewatch	·	1.3 km	MPC · JPL
221164	2005 TY_{121}	—	October 7, 2005	Kitt Peak	Spacewatch	·	970 m	MPC · JPL
221165	2005 TT_{124}	—	October 7, 2005	Kitt Peak	Spacewatch	·	1.7 km	MPC · JPL
221166	2005 TE_{131}	—	October 7, 2005	Kitt Peak	Spacewatch	HOF	2.3 km	MPC · JPL
221167	2005 TJ_{131}	—	October 7, 2005	Kitt Peak	Spacewatch	·	2.6 km	MPC · JPL
221168	2005 TV_{131}	—	October 7, 2005	Kitt Peak	Spacewatch	·	2.1 km	MPC · JPL
221169	2005 TS_{135}	—	October 6, 2005	Kitt Peak	Spacewatch	·	1.2 km	MPC · JPL
221170	2005 TH_{138}	—	October 7, 2005	Catalina	CSS	·	1.8 km	MPC · JPL
221171	2005 TP_{160}	—	October 9, 2005	Kitt Peak	Spacewatch	·	1.6 km	MPC · JPL
221172	2005 TE_{171}	—	October 10, 2005	Anderson Mesa	LONEOS	·	3.2 km	MPC · JPL
221173	2005 TX_{171}	—	October 10, 2005	Catalina	CSS	·	1.6 km	MPC · JPL
221174	2005 TD_{181}	—	October 1, 2005	Kitt Peak	Spacewatch	·	1.7 km	MPC · JPL
221175	2005 UR_{7}	—	October 26, 2005	Ottmarsheim	C. Rinner	·	3.0 km	MPC · JPL
221176	2005 UN_{9}	—	October 21, 2005	Palomar	NEAT	RAF	1.1 km	MPC · JPL
221177	2005 UH_{10}	—	October 21, 2005	Palomar	NEAT	·	2.6 km	MPC · JPL
221178	2005 UE_{18}	—	October 22, 2005	Catalina	CSS	·	1.8 km	MPC · JPL
221179	2005 UQ_{18}	—	October 22, 2005	Kitt Peak	Spacewatch	·	2.4 km	MPC · JPL
221180	2005 UR_{20}	—	October 22, 2005	Kitt Peak	Spacewatch	EUN	5.8 km	MPC · JPL
221181	2005 UA_{23}	—	October 23, 2005	Kitt Peak	Spacewatch	·	2.2 km	MPC · JPL
221182	2005 UG_{25}	—	October 23, 2005	Kitt Peak	Spacewatch	·	1.9 km	MPC · JPL
221183	2005 UY_{28}	—	October 23, 2005	Catalina	CSS	·	1.7 km	MPC · JPL
221184	2005 UA_{29}	—	October 23, 2005	Catalina	CSS	·	2.7 km	MPC · JPL
221185	2005 UN_{29}	—	October 23, 2005	Catalina	CSS	·	2.9 km	MPC · JPL
221186	2005 UD_{30}	—	October 23, 2005	Catalina	CSS	·	2.9 km	MPC · JPL
221187	2005 UV_{31}	—	October 24, 2005	Kitt Peak	Spacewatch	·	1.8 km	MPC · JPL
221188	2005 UJ_{37}	—	October 24, 2005	Kitt Peak	Spacewatch	·	2.1 km	MPC · JPL
221189	2005 UN_{41}	—	October 25, 2005	Catalina	CSS	·	1.9 km	MPC · JPL
221190	2005 UP_{43}	—	October 22, 2005	Kitt Peak	Spacewatch	·	2.3 km	MPC · JPL
221191	2005 UF_{48}	—	October 22, 2005	Palomar	NEAT	(5)	1.5 km	MPC · JPL
221192	2005 UY_{48}	—	October 23, 2005	Catalina	CSS	·	3.0 km	MPC · JPL
221193	2005 UQ_{49}	—	October 23, 2005	Palomar	NEAT	·	2.7 km	MPC · JPL
221194	2005 UF_{52}	—	October 23, 2005	Catalina	CSS	·	2.9 km	MPC · JPL
221195	2005 UJ_{53}	—	October 23, 2005	Catalina	CSS	·	2.8 km	MPC · JPL
221196	2005 UR_{54}	—	October 23, 2005	Catalina	CSS	·	1.9 km	MPC · JPL
221197	2005 UV_{54}	—	October 23, 2005	Catalina	CSS	(5)	1.7 km	MPC · JPL
221198	2005 UH_{55}	—	October 23, 2005	Catalina	CSS	·	2.1 km	MPC · JPL
221199	2005 UU_{55}	—	October 23, 2005	Catalina	CSS	·	2.4 km	MPC · JPL
221200	2005 UA_{56}	—	October 23, 2005	Catalina	CSS	·	2.3 km	MPC · JPL

== 221201–221300 ==
back to top

Designation			Discovery			Properties		Ref
Permanent	Provisional	Named after	Date	Site	Discoverer(s)	Category	Diam.	Ref
221201	2005 UY_{56}	—	October 24, 2005	Anderson Mesa	LONEOS	·	2.7 km	MPC · JPL
221202	2005 UR_{61}	—	October 25, 2005	Mount Lemmon	Mount Lemmon Survey	·	1.7 km	MPC · JPL
221203	2005 UT_{65}	—	October 22, 2005	Catalina	CSS	·	2.4 km	MPC · JPL
221204	2005 UH_{67}	—	October 22, 2005	Palomar	NEAT	·	1.5 km	MPC · JPL
221205	2005 UE_{70}	—	October 23, 2005	Catalina	CSS	·	2.6 km	MPC · JPL
221206	2005 UO_{72}	—	October 23, 2005	Palomar	NEAT	·	2.0 km	MPC · JPL
221207	2005 UD_{74}	—	October 23, 2005	Palomar	NEAT	NEM	3.4 km	MPC · JPL
221208	2005 UX_{76}	—	October 24, 2005	Palomar	NEAT	·	2.0 km	MPC · JPL
221209	2005 UZ_{76}	—	October 24, 2005	Palomar	NEAT	·	2.5 km	MPC · JPL
221210	2005 UJ_{79}	—	October 25, 2005	Catalina	CSS	·	4.2 km	MPC · JPL
221211	2005 UC_{80}	—	October 25, 2005	Catalina	CSS	·	2.5 km	MPC · JPL
221212	2005 UE_{80}	—	October 25, 2005	Catalina	CSS	·	2.5 km	MPC · JPL
221213	2005 UH_{81}	—	October 27, 2005	Mount Lemmon	Mount Lemmon Survey	KOR	1.6 km	MPC · JPL
221214	2005 UQ_{85}	—	October 22, 2005	Kitt Peak	Spacewatch	·	1.7 km	MPC · JPL
221215	2005 UA_{88}	—	October 22, 2005	Kitt Peak	Spacewatch	(5)	1.3 km	MPC · JPL
221216	2005 UM_{91}	—	October 22, 2005	Kitt Peak	Spacewatch	·	2.7 km	MPC · JPL
221217	2005 UJ_{96}	—	October 22, 2005	Kitt Peak	Spacewatch	ADE	3.0 km	MPC · JPL
221218	2005 UK_{96}	—	October 22, 2005	Kitt Peak	Spacewatch	AGN	1.8 km	MPC · JPL
221219	2005 UK_{101}	—	October 22, 2005	Kitt Peak	Spacewatch	PAD	2.1 km	MPC · JPL
221220	2005 UF_{111}	—	October 22, 2005	Kitt Peak	Spacewatch	·	2.6 km	MPC · JPL
221221	2005 UR_{114}	—	October 22, 2005	Palomar	NEAT	·	2.3 km	MPC · JPL
221222	2005 UH_{125}	—	October 24, 2005	Kitt Peak	Spacewatch	·	2.5 km	MPC · JPL
221223	2005 UK_{127}	—	October 24, 2005	Kitt Peak	Spacewatch	·	2.2 km	MPC · JPL
221224	2005 UA_{128}	—	October 24, 2005	Kitt Peak	Spacewatch	KOR	1.4 km	MPC · JPL
221225	2005 UN_{132}	—	October 24, 2005	Palomar	NEAT	·	3.2 km	MPC · JPL
221226	2005 UQ_{138}	—	October 25, 2005	Kitt Peak	Spacewatch	·	2.2 km	MPC · JPL
221227	2005 UA_{148}	—	October 26, 2005	Kitt Peak	Spacewatch	(5)	1.9 km	MPC · JPL
221228	2005 UL_{156}	—	October 24, 2005	Kitt Peak	Spacewatch	·	3.1 km	MPC · JPL
221229	2005 UA_{158}	—	October 28, 2005	Junk Bond	D. Healy	·	1.4 km	MPC · JPL
221230 Sanaloria	2005 US_{158}	Sanaloria	October 30, 2005	Nogales	J.-C. Merlin	·	2.4 km	MPC · JPL
221231	2005 UP_{160}	—	October 22, 2005	Catalina	CSS	ADE	2.3 km	MPC · JPL
221232	2005 UZ_{176}	—	October 24, 2005	Kitt Peak	Spacewatch	·	2.7 km	MPC · JPL
221233	2005 UT_{177}	—	October 24, 2005	Kitt Peak	Spacewatch	WIT	1.5 km	MPC · JPL
221234	2005 UG_{178}	—	October 24, 2005	Kitt Peak	Spacewatch	·	1.9 km	MPC · JPL
221235	2005 UG_{182}	—	October 24, 2005	Kitt Peak	Spacewatch	·	2.0 km	MPC · JPL
221236	2005 US_{190}	—	October 27, 2005	Mount Lemmon	Mount Lemmon Survey	·	2.3 km	MPC · JPL
221237	2005 UT_{190}	—	October 27, 2005	Mount Lemmon	Mount Lemmon Survey	·	1.8 km	MPC · JPL
221238	2005 UQ_{200}	—	October 25, 2005	Kitt Peak	Spacewatch	·	1.9 km	MPC · JPL
221239	2005 UZ_{203}	—	October 25, 2005	Mount Lemmon	Mount Lemmon Survey	·	2.9 km	MPC · JPL
221240	2005 UT_{214}	—	October 27, 2005	Palomar	NEAT	·	3.4 km	MPC · JPL
221241	2005 UK_{215}	—	October 27, 2005	Palomar	NEAT	·	3.3 km	MPC · JPL
221242	2005 UQ_{216}	—	October 25, 2005	Mount Lemmon	Mount Lemmon Survey	MIS	3.7 km	MPC · JPL
221243	2005 UF_{221}	—	October 25, 2005	Kitt Peak	Spacewatch	·	1.9 km	MPC · JPL
221244	2005 UB_{227}	—	October 25, 2005	Kitt Peak	Spacewatch	·	2.3 km	MPC · JPL
221245	2005 UC_{238}	—	October 25, 2005	Kitt Peak	Spacewatch	·	2.9 km	MPC · JPL
221246	2005 UK_{240}	—	October 25, 2005	Kitt Peak	Spacewatch	GEF	1.7 km	MPC · JPL
221247	2005 UT_{245}	—	October 26, 2005	Kitt Peak	Spacewatch	·	3.1 km	MPC · JPL
221248	2005 UN_{251}	—	October 23, 2005	Palomar	NEAT	(5)	1.8 km	MPC · JPL
221249	2005 UE_{252}	—	October 25, 2005	Kitt Peak	Spacewatch	·	1.7 km	MPC · JPL
221250	2005 UY_{253}	—	October 28, 2005	Kitt Peak	Spacewatch	·	2.7 km	MPC · JPL
221251	2005 UJ_{257}	—	October 25, 2005	Kitt Peak	Spacewatch	·	1.9 km	MPC · JPL
221252	2005 UL_{257}	—	October 25, 2005	Kitt Peak	Spacewatch	(21344)	2.6 km	MPC · JPL
221253	2005 UG_{267}	—	October 27, 2005	Kitt Peak	Spacewatch	·	1.5 km	MPC · JPL
221254	2005 UJ_{274}	—	October 25, 2005	Palomar	NEAT	·	2.7 km	MPC · JPL
221255	2005 UJ_{275}	—	October 29, 2005	Kitt Peak	Spacewatch	·	2.8 km	MPC · JPL
221256	2005 UG_{282}	—	October 26, 2005	Kitt Peak	Spacewatch	·	1.6 km	MPC · JPL
221257	2005 UY_{284}	—	October 26, 2005	Kitt Peak	Spacewatch	·	1.9 km	MPC · JPL
221258	2005 UJ_{292}	—	October 26, 2005	Kitt Peak	Spacewatch	·	1.9 km	MPC · JPL
221259	2005 UM_{299}	—	October 26, 2005	Kitt Peak	Spacewatch	·	2.0 km	MPC · JPL
221260	2005 UB_{303}	—	October 26, 2005	Kitt Peak	Spacewatch	·	2.1 km	MPC · JPL
221261	2005 UW_{303}	—	October 26, 2005	Kitt Peak	Spacewatch	·	3.1 km	MPC · JPL
221262	2005 UY_{305}	—	October 27, 2005	Mount Lemmon	Mount Lemmon Survey	·	1.7 km	MPC · JPL
221263	2005 UT_{308}	—	October 28, 2005	Mount Lemmon	Mount Lemmon Survey	·	1.6 km	MPC · JPL
221264	2005 UX_{308}	—	October 28, 2005	Socorro	LINEAR	·	2.8 km	MPC · JPL
221265	2005 UQ_{309}	—	October 28, 2005	Kitt Peak	Spacewatch	·	3.6 km	MPC · JPL
221266	2005 UW_{310}	—	October 29, 2005	Mount Lemmon	Mount Lemmon Survey	·	1.7 km	MPC · JPL
221267	2005 US_{313}	—	October 27, 2005	Socorro	LINEAR	·	3.1 km	MPC · JPL
221268	2005 UT_{317}	—	October 27, 2005	Kitt Peak	Spacewatch	·	1.7 km	MPC · JPL
221269	2005 UL_{320}	—	October 27, 2005	Kitt Peak	Spacewatch	·	2.1 km	MPC · JPL
221270	2005 UN_{321}	—	October 27, 2005	Mount Lemmon	Mount Lemmon Survey	AEO	1.7 km	MPC · JPL
221271	2005 UY_{322}	—	October 28, 2005	Kitt Peak	Spacewatch	·	2.1 km	MPC · JPL
221272	2005 UL_{324}	—	October 29, 2005	Kitt Peak	Spacewatch	·	2.0 km	MPC · JPL
221273	2005 UH_{334}	—	October 29, 2005	Mount Lemmon	Mount Lemmon Survey	·	2.4 km	MPC · JPL
221274	2005 UH_{335}	—	October 30, 2005	Palomar	NEAT	·	2.5 km	MPC · JPL
221275	2005 UD_{340}	—	October 31, 2005	Kitt Peak	Spacewatch	·	2.1 km	MPC · JPL
221276	2005 UQ_{340}	—	October 31, 2005	Kitt Peak	Spacewatch	AGN	1.4 km	MPC · JPL
221277	2005 US_{340}	—	October 31, 2005	Kitt Peak	Spacewatch	·	2.0 km	MPC · JPL
221278	2005 UO_{343}	—	October 31, 2005	Catalina	CSS	MRX	1.3 km	MPC · JPL
221279	2005 UU_{348}	—	October 23, 2005	Palomar	NEAT	EUN	2.8 km	MPC · JPL
221280	2005 UZ_{348}	—	October 24, 2005	Palomar	NEAT	·	2.4 km	MPC · JPL
221281	2005 US_{351}	—	October 29, 2005	Catalina	CSS	(5)	1.7 km	MPC · JPL
221282	2005 UP_{353}	—	October 29, 2005	Catalina	CSS	·	2.7 km	MPC · JPL
221283	2005 UB_{354}	—	October 29, 2005	Kitt Peak	Spacewatch	(5)	2.3 km	MPC · JPL
221284	2005 UW_{355}	—	October 29, 2005	Mount Lemmon	Mount Lemmon Survey	·	2.5 km	MPC · JPL
221285	2005 UZ_{357}	—	October 24, 2005	Kitt Peak	Spacewatch	·	1.9 km	MPC · JPL
221286	2005 UJ_{374}	—	October 27, 2005	Kitt Peak	Spacewatch	KOR	1.6 km	MPC · JPL
221287	2005 UM_{379}	—	October 29, 2005	Mount Lemmon	Mount Lemmon Survey	·	2.0 km	MPC · JPL
221288	2005 UF_{383}	—	October 27, 2005	Socorro	LINEAR	·	2.2 km	MPC · JPL
221289	2005 UO_{386}	—	October 30, 2005	Catalina	CSS	EUN	2.0 km	MPC · JPL
221290	2005 UQ_{439}	—	October 29, 2005	Catalina	CSS	·	1.9 km	MPC · JPL
221291	2005 UF_{440}	—	October 29, 2005	Catalina	CSS	·	2.8 km	MPC · JPL
221292	2005 UK_{449}	—	October 30, 2005	Socorro	LINEAR	·	2.5 km	MPC · JPL
221293	2005 UL_{449}	—	October 30, 2005	Socorro	LINEAR	·	2.8 km	MPC · JPL
221294	2005 UX_{449}	—	October 30, 2005	Mount Lemmon	Mount Lemmon Survey	AGN	1.8 km	MPC · JPL
221295	2005 UB_{460}	—	October 28, 2005	Mount Lemmon	Mount Lemmon Survey	·	2.5 km	MPC · JPL
221296	2005 UT_{479}	—	October 31, 2005	Mount Lemmon	Mount Lemmon Survey	·	1.9 km	MPC · JPL
221297	2005 UG_{482}	—	October 22, 2005	Catalina	CSS	·	1.6 km	MPC · JPL
221298	2005 UA_{487}	—	October 23, 2005	Catalina	CSS	MAR	1.6 km	MPC · JPL
221299	2005 UD_{491}	—	October 23, 2005	Catalina	CSS	·	3.0 km	MPC · JPL
221300	2005 UJ_{493}	—	October 25, 2005	Catalina	CSS	·	2.8 km	MPC · JPL

== 221301–221400 ==
back to top

Designation			Discovery			Properties		Ref
Permanent	Provisional	Named after	Date	Site	Discoverer(s)	Category	Diam.	Ref
221301	2005 UZ_{494}	—	October 25, 2005	Catalina	CSS	·	2.7 km	MPC · JPL
221302	2005 UK_{500}	—	October 27, 2005	Anderson Mesa	LONEOS	EUN	1.8 km	MPC · JPL
221303	2005 UQ_{501}	—	October 27, 2005	Catalina	CSS	·	1.8 km	MPC · JPL
221304	2005 UJ_{509}	—	October 28, 2005	Kitt Peak	Spacewatch	HOF	3.6 km	MPC · JPL
221305	2005 UF_{516}	—	October 28, 2005	Kitt Peak	Spacewatch	·	2.3 km	MPC · JPL
221306	2005 US_{521}	—	October 26, 2005	Apache Point	A. C. Becker	PAD	1.9 km	MPC · JPL
221307	2005 UA_{527}	—	October 25, 2005	Mount Lemmon	Mount Lemmon Survey	AGN	1.4 km	MPC · JPL
221308	2005 VX	—	November 3, 2005	Cordell-Lorenz	Beeson, E. S.	·	2.2 km	MPC · JPL
221309	2005 VK_{5}	—	November 6, 2005	Mayhill	Lowe, A.	·	2.2 km	MPC · JPL
221310	2005 VZ_{15}	—	November 2, 2005	Catalina	CSS	·	2.0 km	MPC · JPL
221311	2005 VW_{16}	—	November 3, 2005	Catalina	CSS	·	3.0 km	MPC · JPL
221312	2005 VE_{17}	—	November 3, 2005	Mount Lemmon	Mount Lemmon Survey	GEF	1.7 km	MPC · JPL
221313	2005 VN_{26}	—	November 3, 2005	Socorro	LINEAR	(5)	1.6 km	MPC · JPL
221314	2005 VB_{42}	—	November 3, 2005	Catalina	CSS	·	3.2 km	MPC · JPL
221315	2005 VM_{42}	—	November 3, 2005	Catalina	CSS	·	3.1 km	MPC · JPL
221316	2005 VW_{50}	—	November 3, 2005	Catalina	CSS	·	1.8 km	MPC · JPL
221317	2005 VT_{51}	—	November 3, 2005	Catalina	CSS	·	2.8 km	MPC · JPL
221318	2005 VF_{53}	—	November 3, 2005	Mount Lemmon	Mount Lemmon Survey	·	2.5 km	MPC · JPL
221319	2005 VG_{61}	—	November 5, 2005	Catalina	CSS	·	3.1 km	MPC · JPL
221320	2005 VG_{77}	—	November 5, 2005	Mount Lemmon	Mount Lemmon Survey	·	2.4 km	MPC · JPL
221321	2005 VD_{86}	—	November 4, 2005	Mount Lemmon	Mount Lemmon Survey	·	1.8 km	MPC · JPL
221322	2005 VG_{98}	—	November 7, 2005	Socorro	LINEAR	·	1.8 km	MPC · JPL
221323	2005 VO_{98}	—	November 10, 2005	Catalina	CSS	·	3.6 km	MPC · JPL
221324	2005 VC_{102}	—	November 1, 2005	Anderson Mesa	LONEOS	·	5.2 km	MPC · JPL
221325	2005 VK_{102}	—	November 1, 2005	Kitt Peak	Spacewatch	·	2.0 km	MPC · JPL
221326	2005 VK_{106}	—	November 1, 2005	Socorro	LINEAR	·	2.1 km	MPC · JPL
221327	2005 VY_{109}	—	November 6, 2005	Mount Lemmon	Mount Lemmon Survey	·	2.1 km	MPC · JPL
221328	2005 VV_{117}	—	November 12, 2005	Catalina	CSS	·	2.1 km	MPC · JPL
221329	2005 VM_{120}	—	November 12, 2005	Kitt Peak	Spacewatch	·	3.7 km	MPC · JPL
221330	2005 VO_{124}	—	November 12, 2005	Kitt Peak	Spacewatch	·	2.0 km	MPC · JPL
221331	2005 VG_{131}	—	November 1, 2005	Apache Point	A. C. Becker	·	2.4 km	MPC · JPL
221332	2005 WB_{2}	—	November 22, 2005	Wrightwood	J. W. Young	KOR	1.7 km	MPC · JPL
221333	2005 WL_{2}	—	November 22, 2005	Socorro	LINEAR	BAR	2.0 km	MPC · JPL
221334	2005 WX_{2}	—	November 20, 2005	Palomar	NEAT	ADE	3.8 km	MPC · JPL
221335	2005 WK_{7}	—	November 21, 2005	Kitt Peak	Spacewatch	·	2.4 km	MPC · JPL
221336	2005 WE_{8}	—	November 22, 2005	Palomar	NEAT	(1547)	1.7 km	MPC · JPL
221337	2005 WG_{13}	—	November 22, 2005	Kitt Peak	Spacewatch	·	2.8 km	MPC · JPL
221338	2005 WP_{15}	—	November 22, 2005	Kitt Peak	Spacewatch	·	2.7 km	MPC · JPL
221339	2005 WO_{25}	—	November 21, 2005	Kitt Peak	Spacewatch	AGN	1.3 km	MPC · JPL
221340	2005 WU_{33}	—	November 21, 2005	Kitt Peak	Spacewatch	·	2.0 km	MPC · JPL
221341	2005 WQ_{37}	—	November 22, 2005	Kitt Peak	Spacewatch	KOR	1.9 km	MPC · JPL
221342	2005 WS_{58}	—	November 26, 2005	Marly	Observatoire Naef	·	4.2 km	MPC · JPL
221343	2005 WT_{58}	—	November 26, 2005	Marly	Observatoire Naef	·	3.1 km	MPC · JPL
221344	2005 WS_{70}	—	November 26, 2005	Mount Lemmon	Mount Lemmon Survey	HOF	3.7 km	MPC · JPL
221345	2005 WE_{81}	—	November 26, 2005	Mount Lemmon	Mount Lemmon Survey	·	3.2 km	MPC · JPL
221346	2005 WG_{85}	—	November 28, 2005	Mount Lemmon	Mount Lemmon Survey	·	2.5 km	MPC · JPL
221347	2005 WZ_{85}	—	November 28, 2005	Mount Lemmon	Mount Lemmon Survey	·	2.3 km	MPC · JPL
221348	2005 WN_{89}	—	November 26, 2005	Kitt Peak	Spacewatch	·	1.4 km	MPC · JPL
221349	2005 WJ_{96}	—	November 26, 2005	Kitt Peak	Spacewatch	·	3.5 km	MPC · JPL
221350	2005 WQ_{103}	—	November 26, 2005	Catalina	CSS	·	2.8 km	MPC · JPL
221351	2005 WN_{108}	—	November 29, 2005	Mount Lemmon	Mount Lemmon Survey	(11882)	2.2 km	MPC · JPL
221352	2005 WU_{110}	—	November 30, 2005	Kitt Peak	Spacewatch	·	2.7 km	MPC · JPL
221353	2005 WL_{114}	—	November 28, 2005	Socorro	LINEAR	·	2.3 km	MPC · JPL
221354	2005 WR_{118}	—	November 25, 2005	Kitt Peak	Spacewatch	·	2.2 km	MPC · JPL
221355	2005 WS_{119}	—	November 28, 2005	Catalina	CSS	(32418)	2.8 km	MPC · JPL
221356	2005 WM_{129}	—	November 25, 2005	Mount Lemmon	Mount Lemmon Survey	·	2.5 km	MPC · JPL
221357	2005 WL_{133}	—	November 25, 2005	Mount Lemmon	Mount Lemmon Survey	KOR	1.4 km	MPC · JPL
221358	2005 WN_{140}	—	November 26, 2005	Mount Lemmon	Mount Lemmon Survey	·	3.9 km	MPC · JPL
221359	2005 WM_{148}	—	November 26, 2005	Catalina	CSS	·	3.3 km	MPC · JPL
221360	2005 WZ_{151}	—	November 28, 2005	Catalina	CSS	(5)	2.3 km	MPC · JPL
221361	2005 WQ_{154}	—	November 29, 2005	Kitt Peak	Spacewatch	·	3.0 km	MPC · JPL
221362	2005 WC_{158}	—	November 26, 2005	Mount Lemmon	Mount Lemmon Survey	·	4.6 km	MPC · JPL
221363	2005 WC_{159}	—	November 28, 2005	Palomar	NEAT	EUN	2.8 km	MPC · JPL
221364	2005 WR_{159}	—	November 30, 2005	Kitt Peak	Spacewatch	·	1.9 km	MPC · JPL
221365	2005 WD_{161}	—	November 28, 2005	Socorro	LINEAR	·	2.6 km	MPC · JPL
221366	2005 WH_{164}	—	November 29, 2005	Mount Lemmon	Mount Lemmon Survey	·	3.5 km	MPC · JPL
221367	2005 WF_{167}	—	November 30, 2005	Kitt Peak	Spacewatch	KOR	1.3 km	MPC · JPL
221368	2005 WO_{182}	—	November 26, 2005	Socorro	LINEAR	·	3.1 km	MPC · JPL
221369	2005 WB_{183}	—	November 28, 2005	Palomar	NEAT	·	2.9 km	MPC · JPL
221370	2005 WK_{195}	—	November 29, 2005	Socorro	LINEAR	·	4.0 km	MPC · JPL
221371	2005 XU	—	December 2, 2005	Mayhill	Lowe, A.	RAF	1.7 km	MPC · JPL
221372	2005 XN_{6}	—	December 2, 2005	Socorro	LINEAR	·	2.1 km	MPC · JPL
221373	2005 XV_{6}	—	December 2, 2005	Mount Lemmon	Mount Lemmon Survey	·	2.2 km	MPC · JPL
221374	2005 XH_{54}	—	December 5, 2005	Kitt Peak	Spacewatch	·	1.8 km	MPC · JPL
221375	2005 XF_{55}	—	December 5, 2005	Socorro	LINEAR	·	2.6 km	MPC · JPL
221376	2005 XL_{56}	—	December 5, 2005	Socorro	LINEAR	·	1.1 km	MPC · JPL
221377	2005 XD_{62}	—	December 5, 2005	Kitt Peak	Spacewatch	·	2.2 km	MPC · JPL
221378	2005 XZ_{66}	—	December 4, 2005	Catalina	CSS	·	2.3 km	MPC · JPL
221379	2005 XY_{81}	—	December 8, 2005	Kitt Peak	Spacewatch	·	3.1 km	MPC · JPL
221380	2005 XV_{84}	—	December 10, 2005	Socorro	LINEAR	·	6.8 km	MPC · JPL
221381	2005 XD_{88}	—	December 5, 2005	Kitt Peak	Spacewatch	·	5.0 km	MPC · JPL
221382	2005 YE_{2}	—	December 21, 2005	Kitt Peak	Spacewatch	HOF	2.9 km	MPC · JPL
221383	2005 YP_{10}	—	December 21, 2005	Kitt Peak	Spacewatch	AST	1.7 km	MPC · JPL
221384	2005 YA_{16}	—	December 22, 2005	Kitt Peak	Spacewatch	KOR	1.7 km	MPC · JPL
221385	2005 YS_{17}	—	December 23, 2005	Kitt Peak	Spacewatch	·	2.0 km	MPC · JPL
221386	2005 YE_{23}	—	December 24, 2005	Kitt Peak	Spacewatch	·	4.4 km	MPC · JPL
221387	2005 YO_{27}	—	December 22, 2005	Kitt Peak	Spacewatch	·	4.5 km	MPC · JPL
221388	2005 YB_{34}	—	December 24, 2005	Kitt Peak	Spacewatch	·	2.0 km	MPC · JPL
221389	2005 YF_{34}	—	December 24, 2005	Kitt Peak	Spacewatch	·	3.2 km	MPC · JPL
221390	2005 YS_{34}	—	December 24, 2005	Kitt Peak	Spacewatch	·	2.1 km	MPC · JPL
221391	2005 YX_{35}	—	December 25, 2005	Kitt Peak	Spacewatch	THM	3.5 km	MPC · JPL
221392	2005 YF_{39}	—	December 22, 2005	Catalina	CSS	·	3.6 km	MPC · JPL
221393	2005 YZ_{42}	—	December 24, 2005	Kitt Peak	Spacewatch	·	4.6 km	MPC · JPL
221394	2005 YS_{51}	—	December 26, 2005	Mount Lemmon	Mount Lemmon Survey	KOR	1.4 km	MPC · JPL
221395	2005 YK_{55}	—	December 25, 2005	Mount Lemmon	Mount Lemmon Survey	·	1.9 km	MPC · JPL
221396	2005 YJ_{56}	—	December 22, 2005	Catalina	CSS	·	3.9 km	MPC · JPL
221397	2005 YQ_{56}	—	December 23, 2005	Kitt Peak	Spacewatch	(17392)	1.7 km	MPC · JPL
221398	2005 YL_{58}	—	December 24, 2005	Kitt Peak	Spacewatch	·	3.4 km	MPC · JPL
221399	2005 YN_{63}	—	December 24, 2005	Kitt Peak	Spacewatch	·	3.2 km	MPC · JPL
221400	2005 YX_{67}	—	December 26, 2005	Kitt Peak	Spacewatch	·	3.0 km	MPC · JPL

== 221401–221500 ==
back to top

Designation			Discovery			Properties		Ref
Permanent	Provisional	Named after	Date	Site	Discoverer(s)	Category	Diam.	Ref
221401	2005 YO_{68}	—	December 26, 2005	Kitt Peak	Spacewatch	·	3.2 km	MPC · JPL
221402	2005 YW_{71}	—	December 24, 2005	Kitt Peak	Spacewatch	·	4.8 km	MPC · JPL
221403	2005 YV_{79}	—	December 24, 2005	Kitt Peak	Spacewatch	·	1.8 km	MPC · JPL
221404	2005 YE_{82}	—	December 24, 2005	Kitt Peak	Spacewatch	·	3.5 km	MPC · JPL
221405	2005 YW_{91}	—	December 26, 2005	Kitt Peak	Spacewatch	·	4.3 km	MPC · JPL
221406	2005 YK_{97}	—	December 24, 2005	Kitt Peak	Spacewatch	KOR	1.8 km	MPC · JPL
221407	2005 YK_{106}	—	December 25, 2005	Kitt Peak	Spacewatch	KOR	2.2 km	MPC · JPL
221408	2005 YZ_{120}	—	December 27, 2005	Mount Lemmon	Mount Lemmon Survey	EOS	3.7 km	MPC · JPL
221409	2005 YF_{122}	—	December 28, 2005	Mount Lemmon	Mount Lemmon Survey	·	2.9 km	MPC · JPL
221410	2005 YL_{122}	—	December 24, 2005	Kitt Peak	Spacewatch	EOS	3.0 km	MPC · JPL
221411	2005 YB_{124}	—	December 25, 2005	Kitt Peak	Spacewatch	·	3.8 km	MPC · JPL
221412	2005 YG_{124}	—	December 26, 2005	Kitt Peak	Spacewatch	·	3.3 km	MPC · JPL
221413	2005 YZ_{130}	—	December 25, 2005	Mount Lemmon	Mount Lemmon Survey	EOS	2.8 km	MPC · JPL
221414	2005 YN_{134}	—	December 26, 2005	Kitt Peak	Spacewatch	·	5.5 km	MPC · JPL
221415	2005 YA_{138}	—	December 26, 2005	Kitt Peak	Spacewatch	·	3.9 km	MPC · JPL
221416	2005 YJ_{143}	—	December 28, 2005	Mount Lemmon	Mount Lemmon Survey	KOR	2.2 km	MPC · JPL
221417	2005 YA_{144}	—	December 28, 2005	Mount Lemmon	Mount Lemmon Survey	·	4.2 km	MPC · JPL
221418	2005 YJ_{164}	—	December 29, 2005	Kitt Peak	Spacewatch	·	1.8 km	MPC · JPL
221419	2005 YC_{172}	—	December 22, 2005	Catalina	CSS	TIR	5.0 km	MPC · JPL
221420	2005 YE_{172}	—	December 22, 2005	Catalina	CSS	·	6.5 km	MPC · JPL
221421	2005 YS_{173}	—	December 25, 2005	Anderson Mesa	LONEOS	·	5.4 km	MPC · JPL
221422	2005 YT_{173}	—	December 25, 2005	Anderson Mesa	LONEOS	·	3.4 km	MPC · JPL
221423	2005 YF_{177}	—	December 22, 2005	Kitt Peak	Spacewatch	·	2.9 km	MPC · JPL
221424	2005 YV_{195}	—	December 31, 2005	Socorro	LINEAR	·	2.8 km	MPC · JPL
221425	2005 YA_{196}	—	December 24, 2005	Socorro	LINEAR	·	2.5 km	MPC · JPL
221426	2005 YZ_{207}	—	December 30, 2005	Kitt Peak	Spacewatch	KOR	1.8 km	MPC · JPL
221427	2005 YD_{216}	—	December 29, 2005	Mount Lemmon	Mount Lemmon Survey	·	2.0 km	MPC · JPL
221428	2005 YD_{221}	—	December 25, 2005	Catalina	CSS	EUP	6.9 km	MPC · JPL
221429	2005 YD_{223}	—	December 24, 2005	Kitt Peak	Spacewatch	KOR	2.1 km	MPC · JPL
221430	2005 YF_{230}	—	December 26, 2005	Mount Lemmon	Mount Lemmon Survey	KOR	1.8 km	MPC · JPL
221431	2005 YZ_{234}	—	December 28, 2005	Mount Lemmon	Mount Lemmon Survey	·	2.4 km	MPC · JPL
221432	2005 YV_{237}	—	December 28, 2005	Kitt Peak	Spacewatch	·	3.4 km	MPC · JPL
221433	2005 YY_{271}	—	December 29, 2005	Kitt Peak	Spacewatch	·	2.1 km	MPC · JPL
221434	2005 YL_{273}	—	December 30, 2005	Kitt Peak	Spacewatch	HYG	4.3 km	MPC · JPL
221435	2006 AL_{6}	—	January 4, 2006	Catalina	CSS	·	3.6 km	MPC · JPL
221436	2006 AH_{7}	—	January 5, 2006	Anderson Mesa	LONEOS	·	5.6 km	MPC · JPL
221437	2006 AQ_{15}	—	January 5, 2006	Mount Lemmon	Mount Lemmon Survey	THM	3.5 km	MPC · JPL
221438	2006 AK_{18}	—	January 5, 2006	Mount Lemmon	Mount Lemmon Survey	·	2.0 km	MPC · JPL
221439	2006 AC_{21}	—	January 5, 2006	Catalina	CSS	·	2.7 km	MPC · JPL
221440	2006 AE_{21}	—	January 5, 2006	Catalina	CSS	GEF	2.1 km	MPC · JPL
221441	2006 AC_{22}	—	January 5, 2006	Catalina	CSS	URS	6.8 km	MPC · JPL
221442	2006 AH_{34}	—	January 6, 2006	Mount Lemmon	Mount Lemmon Survey	·	1.8 km	MPC · JPL
221443	2006 AJ_{38}	—	January 7, 2006	Kitt Peak	Spacewatch	·	5.2 km	MPC · JPL
221444	2006 AT_{38}	—	January 7, 2006	Mount Lemmon	Mount Lemmon Survey	·	1.6 km	MPC · JPL
221445	2006 AM_{63}	—	January 6, 2006	Mount Lemmon	Mount Lemmon Survey	KOR	1.8 km	MPC · JPL
221446	2006 AJ_{72}	—	January 6, 2006	Mount Lemmon	Mount Lemmon Survey	·	2.1 km	MPC · JPL
221447	2006 AJ_{75}	—	January 2, 2006	Socorro	LINEAR	·	5.0 km	MPC · JPL
221448	2006 AP_{81}	—	January 4, 2006	Socorro	LINEAR	·	5.2 km	MPC · JPL
221449	2006 AB_{87}	—	January 7, 2006	Anderson Mesa	LONEOS	·	5.1 km	MPC · JPL
221450	2006 AG_{100}	—	January 6, 2006	Mount Lemmon	Mount Lemmon Survey	HYG	3.8 km	MPC · JPL
221451	2006 BC_{1}	—	January 19, 2006	Catalina	CSS	·	3.4 km	MPC · JPL
221452	2006 BN_{1}	—	January 20, 2006	Kitt Peak	Spacewatch	·	2.7 km	MPC · JPL
221453	2006 BP_{2}	—	January 20, 2006	Catalina	CSS	·	6.2 km	MPC · JPL
221454 Mayerlambert	2006 BW_{8}	Mayerlambert	January 23, 2006	Piszkéstető	K. Sárneczky	·	4.5 km	MPC · JPL
221455	2006 BC_{10}	—	January 23, 2006	Kitt Peak	Spacewatch	APO · PHA	440 m	MPC · JPL
221456	2006 BA_{13}	—	January 21, 2006	Mount Lemmon	Mount Lemmon Survey	THM	3.4 km	MPC · JPL
221457	2006 BD_{46}	—	January 23, 2006	Mount Lemmon	Mount Lemmon Survey	·	3.8 km	MPC · JPL
221458	2006 BD_{57}	—	January 22, 2006	Mount Lemmon	Mount Lemmon Survey	VER	4.4 km	MPC · JPL
221459	2006 BD_{66}	—	January 23, 2006	Kitt Peak	Spacewatch	·	3.0 km	MPC · JPL
221460	2006 BN_{66}	—	January 23, 2006	Kitt Peak	Spacewatch	·	4.8 km	MPC · JPL
221461	2006 BG_{78}	—	January 23, 2006	Mount Lemmon	Mount Lemmon Survey	THM	3.2 km	MPC · JPL
221462	2006 BZ_{82}	—	January 24, 2006	Socorro	LINEAR	KOR	2.2 km	MPC · JPL
221463	2006 BL_{86}	—	January 25, 2006	Kitt Peak	Spacewatch	·	3.2 km	MPC · JPL
221464	2006 BP_{87}	—	January 25, 2006	Kitt Peak	Spacewatch	·	3.5 km	MPC · JPL
221465 Rapa Nui	2006 BE_{99}	Rapa Nui	January 28, 2006	Nogales	J.-C. Merlin	·	5.2 km	MPC · JPL
221466	2006 BG_{118}	—	January 26, 2006	Kitt Peak	Spacewatch	·	3.2 km	MPC · JPL
221467	2006 BX_{124}	—	January 26, 2006	Kitt Peak	Spacewatch	·	3.8 km	MPC · JPL
221468	2006 BJ_{135}	—	January 27, 2006	Mount Lemmon	Mount Lemmon Survey	·	2.7 km	MPC · JPL
221469	2006 BW_{141}	—	January 26, 2006	Kitt Peak	Spacewatch	CYB	5.6 km	MPC · JPL
221470	2006 BS_{143}	—	January 21, 2006	Anderson Mesa	LONEOS	·	3.3 km	MPC · JPL
221471	2006 BH_{147}	—	January 30, 2006	Vail-Jarnac	Jarnac	·	4.2 km	MPC · JPL
221472	2006 BX_{148}	—	January 23, 2006	Kitt Peak	Spacewatch	·	4.7 km	MPC · JPL
221473	2006 BY_{152}	—	January 25, 2006	Kitt Peak	Spacewatch	·	5.5 km	MPC · JPL
221474	2006 BP_{157}	—	January 25, 2006	Kitt Peak	Spacewatch	·	4.1 km	MPC · JPL
221475	2006 BK_{183}	—	January 27, 2006	Anderson Mesa	LONEOS	·	3.0 km	MPC · JPL
221476	2006 BO_{191}	—	January 30, 2006	Kitt Peak	Spacewatch	·	2.7 km	MPC · JPL
221477	2006 BD_{220}	—	January 30, 2006	Kitt Peak	Spacewatch	·	5.9 km	MPC · JPL
221478	2006 BC_{234}	—	January 31, 2006	Kitt Peak	Spacewatch	·	2.5 km	MPC · JPL
221479	2006 BW_{247}	—	January 31, 2006	Kitt Peak	Spacewatch	THM	3.0 km	MPC · JPL
221480	2006 BN_{250}	—	January 31, 2006	Kitt Peak	Spacewatch	THM	2.7 km	MPC · JPL
221481	2006 BN_{252}	—	January 31, 2006	Mount Lemmon	Mount Lemmon Survey	·	2.2 km	MPC · JPL
221482	2006 BT_{253}	—	January 31, 2006	Kitt Peak	Spacewatch	·	3.6 km	MPC · JPL
221483	2006 BD_{264}	—	January 31, 2006	Kitt Peak	Spacewatch	THM	3.3 km	MPC · JPL
221484	2006 BB_{265}	—	January 31, 2006	Kitt Peak	Spacewatch	·	3.9 km	MPC · JPL
221485	2006 BX_{268}	—	January 27, 2006	Anderson Mesa	LONEOS	·	3.9 km	MPC · JPL
221486	2006 BB_{271}	—	January 30, 2006	Catalina	CSS	·	4.5 km	MPC · JPL
221487	2006 BT_{279}	—	January 23, 2006	Mount Lemmon	Mount Lemmon Survey	KOR	2.3 km	MPC · JPL
221488	2006 CB	—	February 1, 2006	7300	W. K. Y. Yeung	·	4.0 km	MPC · JPL
221489	2006 CP_{9}	—	February 4, 2006	7300	W. K. Y. Yeung	·	2.6 km	MPC · JPL
221490	2006 CO_{13}	—	February 1, 2006	Kitt Peak	Spacewatch	·	3.5 km	MPC · JPL
221491	2006 CX_{21}	—	February 1, 2006	Kitt Peak	Spacewatch	·	4.1 km	MPC · JPL
221492	2006 CQ_{22}	—	February 1, 2006	Mount Lemmon	Mount Lemmon Survey	KOR	2.2 km	MPC · JPL
221493	2006 CC_{41}	—	February 2, 2006	Kitt Peak	Spacewatch	·	5.2 km	MPC · JPL
221494	2006 CJ_{48}	—	February 3, 2006	Kitt Peak	Spacewatch	·	3.5 km	MPC · JPL
221495	2006 CK_{56}	—	February 4, 2006	Kitt Peak	Spacewatch	THM	3.1 km	MPC · JPL
221496	2006 CV_{61}	—	February 3, 2006	Socorro	LINEAR	·	4.7 km	MPC · JPL
221497	2006 DW_{3}	—	February 20, 2006	Catalina	CSS	·	4.1 km	MPC · JPL
221498	2006 DH_{4}	—	February 20, 2006	Catalina	CSS	EMA	5.8 km	MPC · JPL
221499	2006 DL_{21}	—	February 20, 2006	Socorro	LINEAR	·	4.6 km	MPC · JPL
221500	2006 DU_{23}	—	February 20, 2006	Kitt Peak	Spacewatch	THM	3.3 km	MPC · JPL

== 221501–221600 ==
back to top

Designation			Discovery			Properties		Ref
Permanent	Provisional	Named after	Date	Site	Discoverer(s)	Category	Diam.	Ref
221501	2006 DV_{42}	—	February 20, 2006	Kitt Peak	Spacewatch	·	3.8 km	MPC · JPL
221502	2006 DS_{49}	—	February 22, 2006	Anderson Mesa	LONEOS	·	4.5 km	MPC · JPL
221503	2006 DE_{60}	—	February 24, 2006	Kitt Peak	Spacewatch	·	2.8 km	MPC · JPL
221504	2006 DE_{64}	—	February 20, 2006	Socorro	LINEAR	EOS	4.2 km	MPC · JPL
221505	2006 DR_{66}	—	February 22, 2006	Catalina	CSS	·	5.1 km	MPC · JPL
221506	2006 DX_{66}	—	February 22, 2006	Anderson Mesa	LONEOS	·	5.0 km	MPC · JPL
221507	2006 DE_{102}	—	February 25, 2006	Kitt Peak	Spacewatch	3:2	7.8 km	MPC · JPL
221508	2006 DB_{134}	—	February 25, 2006	Kitt Peak	Spacewatch	·	3.5 km	MPC · JPL
221509	2006 DE_{207}	—	February 25, 2006	Mount Lemmon	Mount Lemmon Survey	·	3.0 km	MPC · JPL
221510	2006 EV_{8}	—	March 2, 2006	Kitt Peak	Spacewatch	·	2.7 km	MPC · JPL
221511	2006 EG_{14}	—	March 2, 2006	Kitt Peak	Spacewatch	·	3.2 km	MPC · JPL
221512	2006 EY_{36}	—	March 3, 2006	Mount Lemmon	Mount Lemmon Survey	·	3.0 km	MPC · JPL
221513	2006 GY_{49}	—	April 7, 2006	Siding Spring	SSS	·	7.7 km	MPC · JPL
221514	2006 HO_{4}	—	April 19, 2006	Palomar	NEAT	·	4.4 km	MPC · JPL
221515	2006 HX_{150}	—	April 26, 2006	Kitt Peak	Spacewatch	·	2.1 km	MPC · JPL
221516 Bergen-Enkheim	2006 PR_{4}	Bergen-Enkheim	August 13, 2006	Bergen-Enkheim	Suessenberger, U.	H	800 m	MPC · JPL
221517	2006 RB_{46}	—	September 14, 2006	Kitt Peak	Spacewatch	(2076)	840 m	MPC · JPL
221518	2006 RT_{53}	—	September 14, 2006	Kitt Peak	Spacewatch	·	1.1 km	MPC · JPL
221519	2006 RO_{90}	—	September 15, 2006	Kitt Peak	Spacewatch	·	830 m	MPC · JPL
221520	2006 SS_{24}	—	September 16, 2006	Catalina	CSS	·	950 m	MPC · JPL
221521	2006 SB_{140}	—	September 22, 2006	Anderson Mesa	LONEOS	·	740 m	MPC · JPL
221522	2006 SK_{154}	—	September 20, 2006	Socorro	LINEAR	·	1.6 km	MPC · JPL
221523	2006 SA_{161}	—	September 23, 2006	Kitt Peak	Spacewatch	·	1.1 km	MPC · JPL
221524	2006 SJ_{224}	—	September 25, 2006	Mount Lemmon	Mount Lemmon Survey	·	960 m	MPC · JPL
221525	2006 SO_{312}	—	September 27, 2006	Mount Lemmon	Mount Lemmon Survey	·	780 m	MPC · JPL
221526	2006 SN_{362}	—	September 30, 2006	Mount Lemmon	Mount Lemmon Survey	·	1.1 km	MPC · JPL
221527	2006 SD_{411}	—	September 25, 2006	Mount Lemmon	Mount Lemmon Survey	HNS	2.0 km	MPC · JPL
221528 Kosztolányi	2006 TG_{10}	Kosztolányi	October 14, 2006	Piszkéstető	K. Sárneczky, Kuli, Z.	·	810 m	MPC · JPL
221529 Tamkósirató	2006 TS_{10}	Tamkósirató	October 15, 2006	Piszkéstető	K. Sárneczky, Kuli, Z.	·	1.2 km	MPC · JPL
221530	2006 TX_{44}	—	October 12, 2006	Kitt Peak	Spacewatch	·	830 m	MPC · JPL
221531	2006 TR_{51}	—	October 12, 2006	Kitt Peak	Spacewatch	·	1 km	MPC · JPL
221532	2006 TH_{60}	—	October 13, 2006	Kitt Peak	Spacewatch	·	920 m	MPC · JPL
221533	2006 TX_{72}	—	October 11, 2006	Palomar	NEAT	·	950 m	MPC · JPL
221534	2006 TQ_{80}	—	October 13, 2006	Kitt Peak	Spacewatch	·	1.2 km	MPC · JPL
221535	2006 TU_{80}	—	October 13, 2006	Kitt Peak	Spacewatch	·	950 m	MPC · JPL
221536	2006 TS_{81}	—	October 13, 2006	Kitt Peak	Spacewatch	·	790 m	MPC · JPL
221537	2006 TZ_{83}	—	October 13, 2006	Kitt Peak	Spacewatch	·	930 m	MPC · JPL
221538	2006 TC_{86}	—	October 13, 2006	Kitt Peak	Spacewatch	·	1.2 km	MPC · JPL
221539	2006 TP_{90}	—	October 13, 2006	Kitt Peak	Spacewatch	·	910 m	MPC · JPL
221540	2006 TG_{128}	—	October 1, 2006	Kitt Peak	Spacewatch	NYS · slow	2.1 km	MPC · JPL
221541	2006 UZ_{61}	—	October 18, 2006	Mount Nyukasa	Japan Aerospace Exploration Agency	·	1.2 km	MPC · JPL
221542	2006 UB_{63}	—	October 22, 2006	Mount Lemmon	Mount Lemmon Survey	L4	18 km	MPC · JPL
221543	2006 UF_{69}	—	October 16, 2006	Catalina	CSS	·	1.0 km	MPC · JPL
221544	2006 US_{84}	—	October 17, 2006	Kitt Peak	Spacewatch	·	720 m	MPC · JPL
221545	2006 UF_{89}	—	October 17, 2006	Kitt Peak	Spacewatch	·	1.2 km	MPC · JPL
221546	2006 UN_{89}	—	October 17, 2006	Kitt Peak	Spacewatch	·	1.1 km	MPC · JPL
221547	2006 UL_{98}	—	October 18, 2006	Kitt Peak	Spacewatch	·	790 m	MPC · JPL
221548	2006 UX_{116}	—	October 19, 2006	Kitt Peak	Spacewatch	·	820 m	MPC · JPL
221549	2006 US_{126}	—	October 19, 2006	Kitt Peak	Spacewatch	·	780 m	MPC · JPL
221550	2006 UJ_{134}	—	October 19, 2006	Kitt Peak	Spacewatch	·	1.1 km	MPC · JPL
221551	2006 UW_{137}	—	October 19, 2006	Catalina	CSS	·	1.6 km	MPC · JPL
221552	2006 UZ_{151}	—	October 20, 2006	Mount Lemmon	Mount Lemmon Survey	·	890 m	MPC · JPL
221553	2006 UP_{171}	—	October 21, 2006	Mount Lemmon	Mount Lemmon Survey	·	960 m	MPC · JPL
221554	2006 UO_{174}	—	October 19, 2006	Mount Lemmon	Mount Lemmon Survey	·	970 m	MPC · JPL
221555	2006 UZ_{175}	—	October 16, 2006	Catalina	CSS	·	1.1 km	MPC · JPL
221556	2006 UG_{180}	—	October 16, 2006	Catalina	CSS	·	1.1 km	MPC · JPL
221557	2006 UY_{181}	—	October 16, 2006	Catalina	CSS	·	830 m	MPC · JPL
221558	2006 UV_{198}	—	October 20, 2006	Mount Lemmon	Mount Lemmon Survey	·	840 m	MPC · JPL
221559	2006 UD_{237}	—	October 23, 2006	Kitt Peak	Spacewatch	·	910 m	MPC · JPL
221560	2006 UF_{267}	—	October 27, 2006	Catalina	CSS	·	1.2 km	MPC · JPL
221561	2006 UL_{275}	—	October 28, 2006	Kitt Peak	Spacewatch	·	890 m	MPC · JPL
221562	2006 UF_{281}	—	October 28, 2006	Mount Lemmon	Mount Lemmon Survey	·	880 m	MPC · JPL
221563	2006 UC_{287}	—	October 28, 2006	Kitt Peak	Spacewatch	·	940 m	MPC · JPL
221564	2006 UU_{287}	—	October 29, 2006	Kitt Peak	Spacewatch	·	790 m	MPC · JPL
221565	2006 UK_{288}	—	October 29, 2006	Catalina	CSS	·	1.2 km	MPC · JPL
221566 Omarcustodio	2006 UZ_{325}	Omarcustodio	October 20, 2006	Kitt Peak	M. W. Buie	MAS	1.3 km	MPC · JPL
221567	2006 UW_{335}	—	October 19, 2006	Catalina	CSS	·	1.2 km	MPC · JPL
221568	2006 VQ_{8}	—	November 11, 2006	Kitt Peak	Spacewatch	·	1.0 km	MPC · JPL
221569	2006 VD_{20}	—	November 9, 2006	Kitt Peak	Spacewatch	·	1.0 km	MPC · JPL
221570	2006 VG_{28}	—	November 10, 2006	Kitt Peak	Spacewatch	V	850 m	MPC · JPL
221571	2006 VZ_{42}	—	November 13, 2006	Kitt Peak	Spacewatch	·	1.6 km	MPC · JPL
221572	2006 VR_{50}	—	November 10, 2006	Kitt Peak	Spacewatch	·	1.1 km	MPC · JPL
221573	2006 VN_{58}	—	November 11, 2006	Kitt Peak	Spacewatch	·	840 m	MPC · JPL
221574	2006 VX_{61}	—	November 11, 2006	Kitt Peak	Spacewatch	·	700 m	MPC · JPL
221575	2006 VX_{64}	—	November 11, 2006	Kitt Peak	Spacewatch	·	880 m	MPC · JPL
221576	2006 VA_{73}	—	November 11, 2006	Catalina	CSS	·	980 m	MPC · JPL
221577	2006 VP_{73}	—	November 11, 2006	Mount Lemmon	Mount Lemmon Survey	NYS	1.6 km	MPC · JPL
221578	2006 VQ_{84}	—	November 13, 2006	Kitt Peak	Spacewatch	·	860 m	MPC · JPL
221579	2006 VC_{92}	—	November 15, 2006	Kitt Peak	Spacewatch	·	1.2 km	MPC · JPL
221580	2006 VX_{95}	—	November 15, 2006	Socorro	LINEAR	·	840 m	MPC · JPL
221581	2006 VR_{102}	—	November 12, 2006	Mount Lemmon	Mount Lemmon Survey	·	1.2 km	MPC · JPL
221582	2006 VL_{104}	—	November 13, 2006	Mount Lemmon	Mount Lemmon Survey	·	870 m	MPC · JPL
221583	2006 VN_{112}	—	November 13, 2006	Palomar	NEAT	·	940 m	MPC · JPL
221584	2006 VK_{130}	—	November 15, 2006	Kitt Peak	Spacewatch	·	1.7 km	MPC · JPL
221585	2006 VW_{130}	—	November 15, 2006	Catalina	CSS	·	1.1 km	MPC · JPL
221586	2006 VB_{143}	—	November 14, 2006	Kitt Peak	Spacewatch	V	950 m	MPC · JPL
221587	2006 VT_{146}	—	November 15, 2006	Mount Lemmon	Mount Lemmon Survey	·	950 m	MPC · JPL
221588	2006 VT_{148}	—	November 15, 2006	Mount Lemmon	Mount Lemmon Survey	·	960 m	MPC · JPL
221589	2006 VT_{150}	—	November 9, 2006	Palomar	NEAT	·	1.2 km	MPC · JPL
221590	2006 VK_{152}	—	November 9, 2006	Palomar	NEAT	·	1.2 km	MPC · JPL
221591	2006 VD_{155}	—	November 11, 2006	Kitt Peak	Spacewatch	·	810 m	MPC · JPL
221592	2006 VJ_{168}	—	November 2, 2006	Mount Lemmon	Mount Lemmon Survey	·	1.2 km	MPC · JPL
221593	2006 WG_{17}	—	November 17, 2006	Mount Lemmon	Mount Lemmon Survey	·	1.0 km	MPC · JPL
221594	2006 WN_{30}	—	November 18, 2006	Lulin	Chang, M.-T., Q. Ye	·	1.1 km	MPC · JPL
221595	2006 WE_{34}	—	November 16, 2006	Kitt Peak	Spacewatch	·	1.7 km	MPC · JPL
221596	2006 WD_{36}	—	November 16, 2006	Kitt Peak	Spacewatch	·	1.9 km	MPC · JPL
221597	2006 WP_{51}	—	November 16, 2006	Kitt Peak	Spacewatch	·	1.1 km	MPC · JPL
221598	2006 WB_{89}	—	November 18, 2006	Kitt Peak	Spacewatch	·	1.4 km	MPC · JPL
221599	2006 WK_{96}	—	November 19, 2006	Kitt Peak	Spacewatch	NYS	940 m	MPC · JPL
221600	2006 WF_{101}	—	November 19, 2006	Socorro	LINEAR	·	790 m	MPC · JPL

== 221601–221700 ==
back to top

Designation			Discovery			Properties		Ref
Permanent	Provisional	Named after	Date	Site	Discoverer(s)	Category	Diam.	Ref
221601	2006 WG_{108}	—	November 19, 2006	Socorro	LINEAR	·	1.2 km	MPC · JPL
221602	2006 WE_{113}	—	November 19, 2006	Kitt Peak	Spacewatch	·	1.9 km	MPC · JPL
221603	2006 WS_{118}	—	November 20, 2006	Kitt Peak	Spacewatch	·	790 m	MPC · JPL
221604	2006 WP_{123}	—	November 21, 2006	Mount Lemmon	Mount Lemmon Survey	·	1.8 km	MPC · JPL
221605	2006 WJ_{149}	—	November 20, 2006	Kitt Peak	Spacewatch	·	1.7 km	MPC · JPL
221606	2006 WA_{160}	—	November 22, 2006	Mount Lemmon	Mount Lemmon Survey	·	1.4 km	MPC · JPL
221607	2006 WJ_{169}	—	November 23, 2006	Kitt Peak	Spacewatch	MAS	1.0 km	MPC · JPL
221608	2006 WT_{185}	—	November 17, 2006	Palomar	NEAT	·	1.1 km	MPC · JPL
221609	2006 WH_{198}	—	November 27, 2006	Mount Lemmon	Mount Lemmon Survey	·	1.1 km	MPC · JPL
221610	2006 WB_{201}	—	November 22, 2006	Mount Lemmon	Mount Lemmon Survey	·	1.5 km	MPC · JPL
221611	2006 XB_{8}	—	December 9, 2006	Palomar	NEAT	·	1.3 km	MPC · JPL
221612	2006 XZ_{8}	—	December 9, 2006	Kitt Peak	Spacewatch	NYS	1.1 km	MPC · JPL
221613	2006 XQ_{34}	—	December 11, 2006	Kitt Peak	Spacewatch	·	1.8 km	MPC · JPL
221614	2006 XQ_{37}	—	December 11, 2006	Kitt Peak	Spacewatch	·	1.1 km	MPC · JPL
221615	2006 XJ_{38}	—	December 11, 2006	Kitt Peak	Spacewatch	·	2.7 km	MPC · JPL
221616	2006 XX_{38}	—	December 11, 2006	Kitt Peak	Spacewatch	·	2.0 km	MPC · JPL
221617	2006 XO_{43}	—	December 12, 2006	Mount Lemmon	Mount Lemmon Survey	·	3.7 km	MPC · JPL
221618	2006 XT_{46}	—	December 13, 2006	Socorro	LINEAR	PHO	1.5 km	MPC · JPL
221619	2006 XH_{48}	—	December 13, 2006	Catalina	CSS	·	960 m	MPC · JPL
221620	2006 XZ_{51}	—	December 14, 2006	Socorro	LINEAR	·	1.5 km	MPC · JPL
221621	2006 XL_{54}	—	December 15, 2006	Socorro	LINEAR	PHO	2.2 km	MPC · JPL
221622	2006 XM_{60}	—	December 14, 2006	Kitt Peak	Spacewatch	·	3.4 km	MPC · JPL
221623	2006 XH_{61}	—	December 15, 2006	Kitt Peak	Spacewatch	·	1.9 km	MPC · JPL
221624	2006 XK_{66}	—	December 13, 2006	Socorro	LINEAR	·	1.2 km	MPC · JPL
221625	2006 XW_{70}	—	December 13, 2006	Mount Lemmon	Mount Lemmon Survey	NYS	1.5 km	MPC · JPL
221626	2006 YS_{1}	—	December 17, 2006	Mount Lemmon	Mount Lemmon Survey	·	1.6 km	MPC · JPL
221627	2006 YX_{6}	—	December 20, 2006	Palomar	NEAT	NYS	1.3 km	MPC · JPL
221628 Hyatt	2006 YE_{13}	Hyatt	December 26, 2006	Mount Bigelow	CSS	T_{j} (2.93)	6.9 km	MPC · JPL
221629	2006 YP_{17}	—	December 21, 2006	Mount Lemmon	Mount Lemmon Survey	NYS	1.2 km	MPC · JPL
221630	2006 YA_{35}	—	December 21, 2006	Kitt Peak	Spacewatch	V	940 m	MPC · JPL
221631	2006 YV_{47}	—	December 24, 2006	Catalina	CSS	NYS	1.3 km	MPC · JPL
221632	2006 YX_{51}	—	December 27, 2006	Mount Lemmon	Mount Lemmon Survey	NYS	1.5 km	MPC · JPL
221633	2007 AJ_{3}	—	January 8, 2007	Kitt Peak	Spacewatch	(2076)	1.0 km	MPC · JPL
221634	2007 AV_{8}	—	January 10, 2007	Kitt Peak	Spacewatch	·	1.8 km	MPC · JPL
221635	2007 AO_{22}	—	January 14, 2007	Mount Nyukasa	Japan Aerospace Exploration Agency	(2076)	1.3 km	MPC · JPL
221636	2007 AJ_{25}	—	January 15, 2007	Catalina	CSS	·	2.0 km	MPC · JPL
221637	2007 AC_{29}	—	January 10, 2007	Mount Lemmon	Mount Lemmon Survey	NEM	3.4 km	MPC · JPL
221638	2007 BO_{4}	—	January 16, 2007	Socorro	LINEAR	·	3.2 km	MPC · JPL
221639	2007 BA_{13}	—	January 17, 2007	Kitt Peak	Spacewatch	MAS	1.1 km	MPC · JPL
221640	2007 BT_{25}	—	January 24, 2007	Mount Lemmon	Mount Lemmon Survey	MAS	870 m	MPC · JPL
221641	2007 BC_{26}	—	January 24, 2007	Mount Lemmon	Mount Lemmon Survey	NYS	1.2 km	MPC · JPL
221642	2007 BH_{47}	—	January 26, 2007	Kitt Peak	Spacewatch	·	2.7 km	MPC · JPL
221643	2007 BZ_{47}	—	January 26, 2007	Kitt Peak	Spacewatch	·	2.3 km	MPC · JPL
221644	2007 BQ_{57}	—	January 24, 2007	Socorro	LINEAR	·	2.2 km	MPC · JPL
221645	2007 BK_{58}	—	January 24, 2007	Catalina	CSS	MAS	1.1 km	MPC · JPL
221646	2007 BX_{58}	—	January 24, 2007	Catalina	CSS	NYS	1.4 km	MPC · JPL
221647	2007 BB_{60}	—	January 26, 2007	Anderson Mesa	LONEOS	MAR	1.9 km	MPC · JPL
221648	2007 BZ_{68}	—	January 27, 2007	Mount Lemmon	Mount Lemmon Survey	·	1.3 km	MPC · JPL
221649	2007 BJ_{74}	—	January 17, 2007	Kitt Peak	Spacewatch	·	2.1 km	MPC · JPL
221650	2007 BD_{75}	—	January 28, 2007	Catalina	CSS	PHO	1.4 km	MPC · JPL
221651	2007 BE_{75}	—	January 28, 2007	Mount Lemmon	Mount Lemmon Survey	HOF	3.9 km	MPC · JPL
221652	2007 BM_{78}	—	January 25, 2007	Kitt Peak	Spacewatch	·	1.2 km	MPC · JPL
221653	2007 BJ_{101}	—	January 27, 2007	Kitt Peak	Spacewatch	·	1.8 km	MPC · JPL
221654	2007 CZ	—	February 6, 2007	Kitt Peak	Spacewatch	·	2.0 km	MPC · JPL
221655	2007 CP_{1}	—	February 6, 2007	Kitt Peak	Spacewatch	EOS	2.9 km	MPC · JPL
221656	2007 CH_{4}	—	February 6, 2007	Kitt Peak	Spacewatch	·	1.8 km	MPC · JPL
221657	2007 CS_{9}	—	February 6, 2007	Palomar	NEAT	·	1.6 km	MPC · JPL
221658	2007 CR_{15}	—	February 6, 2007	Palomar	NEAT	MAR	1.4 km	MPC · JPL
221659	2007 CG_{16}	—	February 6, 2007	Mount Lemmon	Mount Lemmon Survey	·	2.5 km	MPC · JPL
221660	2007 CC_{18}	—	February 8, 2007	Mount Lemmon	Mount Lemmon Survey	·	3.6 km	MPC · JPL
221661	2007 CW_{22}	—	February 6, 2007	Mount Lemmon	Mount Lemmon Survey	AGN	1.6 km	MPC · JPL
221662	2007 CC_{24}	—	February 8, 2007	Kitt Peak	Spacewatch	·	3.0 km	MPC · JPL
221663	2007 CJ_{40}	—	February 7, 2007	Kitt Peak	Spacewatch	NYS	1.6 km	MPC · JPL
221664	2007 CK_{40}	—	February 7, 2007	Kitt Peak	Spacewatch	·	3.5 km	MPC · JPL
221665	2007 CE_{42}	—	February 7, 2007	Mount Lemmon	Mount Lemmon Survey	THM	2.6 km	MPC · JPL
221666	2007 CG_{42}	—	February 7, 2007	Mount Lemmon	Mount Lemmon Survey	·	2.3 km	MPC · JPL
221667	2007 CP_{47}	—	February 10, 2007	Catalina	CSS	·	1.5 km	MPC · JPL
221668	2007 CU_{51}	—	February 8, 2007	Palomar	NEAT	·	2.1 km	MPC · JPL
221669	2007 CP_{52}	—	February 10, 2007	Catalina	CSS	(194)	3.6 km	MPC · JPL
221670	2007 CB_{56}	—	February 13, 2007	Socorro	LINEAR	·	2.9 km	MPC · JPL
221671	2007 CW_{56}	—	February 15, 2007	Catalina	CSS	·	6.3 km	MPC · JPL
221672	2007 CW_{63}	—	February 15, 2007	Palomar	NEAT	·	2.9 km	MPC · JPL
221673 Duschl	2007 DP	Duschl	February 17, 2007	Altschwendt	W. Ries	·	2.2 km	MPC · JPL
221674	2007 DY_{1}	—	February 16, 2007	Catalina	CSS	·	1.3 km	MPC · JPL
221675	2007 DU_{3}	—	February 16, 2007	Mount Lemmon	Mount Lemmon Survey	·	1.7 km	MPC · JPL
221676	2007 DP_{4}	—	February 16, 2007	Mount Lemmon	Mount Lemmon Survey	HNS	2.0 km	MPC · JPL
221677	2007 DG_{9}	—	February 17, 2007	Kitt Peak	Spacewatch	·	1.8 km	MPC · JPL
221678	2007 DL_{10}	—	February 17, 2007	Kitt Peak	Spacewatch	TEL	1.8 km	MPC · JPL
221679	2007 DH_{11}	—	February 17, 2007	Kitt Peak	Spacewatch	·	2.9 km	MPC · JPL
221680	2007 DZ_{18}	—	February 17, 2007	Kitt Peak	Spacewatch	·	3.1 km	MPC · JPL
221681	2007 DY_{19}	—	February 17, 2007	Kitt Peak	Spacewatch	·	3.0 km	MPC · JPL
221682	2007 DK_{22}	—	February 17, 2007	Kitt Peak	Spacewatch	(7744)	1.7 km	MPC · JPL
221683	2007 DB_{23}	—	February 17, 2007	Kitt Peak	Spacewatch	KOR	1.5 km	MPC · JPL
221684	2007 DS_{25}	—	February 17, 2007	Kitt Peak	Spacewatch	·	2.5 km	MPC · JPL
221685	2007 DL_{26}	—	February 17, 2007	Kitt Peak	Spacewatch	NAE	2.5 km	MPC · JPL
221686	2007 DA_{35}	—	February 17, 2007	Kitt Peak	Spacewatch	·	4.4 km	MPC · JPL
221687	2007 DW_{35}	—	February 17, 2007	Kitt Peak	Spacewatch	PHO	910 m	MPC · JPL
221688	2007 DV_{36}	—	February 17, 2007	Kitt Peak	Spacewatch	·	4.4 km	MPC · JPL
221689	2007 DW_{42}	—	February 17, 2007	Catalina	CSS	·	1.6 km	MPC · JPL
221690	2007 DZ_{47}	—	February 21, 2007	Mount Lemmon	Mount Lemmon Survey	·	2.5 km	MPC · JPL
221691	2007 DE_{50}	—	February 16, 2007	Palomar	NEAT	·	2.3 km	MPC · JPL
221692	2007 DJ_{50}	—	February 16, 2007	Palomar	NEAT	·	2.5 km	MPC · JPL
221693	2007 DM_{53}	—	February 19, 2007	Mount Lemmon	Mount Lemmon Survey	EOS	2.5 km	MPC · JPL
221694	2007 DY_{53}	—	February 19, 2007	Mount Lemmon	Mount Lemmon Survey	·	3.2 km	MPC · JPL
221695	2007 DV_{54}	—	February 21, 2007	Mount Lemmon	Mount Lemmon Survey	·	1.5 km	MPC · JPL
221696	2007 DE_{59}	—	February 22, 2007	Kitt Peak	Spacewatch	·	3.0 km	MPC · JPL
221697	2007 DE_{60}	—	February 23, 2007	Socorro	LINEAR	·	6.1 km	MPC · JPL
221698 Juliusolsen	2007 DQ_{63}	Juliusolsen	February 21, 2007	Charleston	R. Holmes	HOF	3.7 km	MPC · JPL
221699	2007 DT_{69}	—	February 21, 2007	Socorro	LINEAR	·	1.3 km	MPC · JPL
221700	2007 DH_{71}	—	February 21, 2007	Kitt Peak	Spacewatch	·	4.2 km	MPC · JPL

== 221701–221800 ==
back to top

Designation			Discovery			Properties		Ref
Permanent	Provisional	Named after	Date	Site	Discoverer(s)	Category	Diam.	Ref
221701	2007 DZ_{75}	—	February 21, 2007	Kitt Peak	Spacewatch	·	5.0 km	MPC · JPL
221702	2007 DR_{95}	—	February 23, 2007	Kitt Peak	Spacewatch	·	2.3 km	MPC · JPL
221703	2007 DT_{96}	—	February 23, 2007	Kitt Peak	Spacewatch	·	2.3 km	MPC · JPL
221704	2007 DH_{97}	—	February 23, 2007	Mount Lemmon	Mount Lemmon Survey	·	1.9 km	MPC · JPL
221705	2007 DT_{100}	—	February 25, 2007	Kitt Peak	Spacewatch	·	2.4 km	MPC · JPL
221706	2007 DH_{106}	—	February 26, 2007	Mount Lemmon	Mount Lemmon Survey	·	3.2 km	MPC · JPL
221707	2007 DE_{111}	—	February 23, 2007	Mount Lemmon	Mount Lemmon Survey	·	2.1 km	MPC · JPL
221708	2007 DB_{113}	—	February 17, 2007	Mount Lemmon	Mount Lemmon Survey	·	3.0 km	MPC · JPL
221709	2007 DK_{115}	—	February 17, 2007	Kitt Peak	Spacewatch	HYG	3.5 km	MPC · JPL
221710	2007 EP_{3}	—	March 9, 2007	Catalina	CSS	(11882)	2.2 km	MPC · JPL
221711	2007 EC_{6}	—	March 9, 2007	Mount Lemmon	Mount Lemmon Survey	·	2.1 km	MPC · JPL
221712 Moléson	2007 EA_{10}	Moléson	March 10, 2007	Marly	P. Kocher	·	1.6 km	MPC · JPL
221713	2007 EM_{10}	—	March 9, 2007	Kitt Peak	Spacewatch	·	2.1 km	MPC · JPL
221714	2007 EH_{13}	—	March 9, 2007	Mount Lemmon	Mount Lemmon Survey	MAS	750 m	MPC · JPL
221715	2007 EN_{13}	—	March 9, 2007	Mount Lemmon	Mount Lemmon Survey	EOS	3.0 km	MPC · JPL
221716	2007 EY_{22}	—	March 10, 2007	Mount Lemmon	Mount Lemmon Survey	KOR	1.5 km	MPC · JPL
221717	2007 EH_{24}	—	March 10, 2007	Mount Lemmon	Mount Lemmon Survey	·	5.6 km	MPC · JPL
221718	2007 EY_{33}	—	March 10, 2007	Mount Lemmon	Mount Lemmon Survey	·	3.8 km	MPC · JPL
221719	2007 EB_{34}	—	March 10, 2007	Mount Lemmon	Mount Lemmon Survey	·	4.1 km	MPC · JPL
221720	2007 EF_{35}	—	March 11, 2007	Kitt Peak	Spacewatch	EOS	3.2 km	MPC · JPL
221721	2007 EV_{37}	—	March 11, 2007	Mount Lemmon	Mount Lemmon Survey	·	3.1 km	MPC · JPL
221722	2007 EC_{43}	—	March 9, 2007	Kitt Peak	Spacewatch	·	1.8 km	MPC · JPL
221723	2007 EH_{43}	—	March 9, 2007	Kitt Peak	Spacewatch	·	4.3 km	MPC · JPL
221724	2007 ES_{46}	—	March 9, 2007	Mount Lemmon	Mount Lemmon Survey	·	1.4 km	MPC · JPL
221725	2007 EV_{48}	—	March 9, 2007	Kitt Peak	Spacewatch	·	5.1 km	MPC · JPL
221726	2007 EY_{51}	—	March 11, 2007	Catalina	CSS	·	4.3 km	MPC · JPL
221727	2007 ED_{52}	—	March 11, 2007	Catalina	CSS	·	2.8 km	MPC · JPL
221728	2007 EO_{52}	—	March 11, 2007	Catalina	CSS	·	2.3 km	MPC · JPL
221729	2007 EM_{53}	—	March 11, 2007	Mount Lemmon	Mount Lemmon Survey	AGN	1.5 km	MPC · JPL
221730	2007 EJ_{64}	—	March 10, 2007	Mount Lemmon	Mount Lemmon Survey	AGN	1.2 km	MPC · JPL
221731	2007 EE_{67}	—	March 10, 2007	Kitt Peak	Spacewatch	·	1.8 km	MPC · JPL
221732	2007 EG_{75}	—	March 10, 2007	Kitt Peak	Spacewatch	·	4.8 km	MPC · JPL
221733	2007 EQ_{75}	—	March 10, 2007	Kitt Peak	Spacewatch	·	990 m	MPC · JPL
221734	2007 ES_{85}	—	March 12, 2007	Kitt Peak	Spacewatch	·	3.5 km	MPC · JPL
221735	2007 EQ_{101}	—	March 11, 2007	Kitt Peak	Spacewatch	AGN	1.9 km	MPC · JPL
221736	2007 EH_{109}	—	March 11, 2007	Kitt Peak	Spacewatch	·	4.4 km	MPC · JPL
221737	2007 ED_{112}	—	March 11, 2007	Kitt Peak	Spacewatch	CYB	5.5 km	MPC · JPL
221738	2007 EN_{113}	—	March 12, 2007	Kitt Peak	Spacewatch	·	3.9 km	MPC · JPL
221739	2007 EE_{123}	—	March 14, 2007	Mount Lemmon	Mount Lemmon Survey	·	4.4 km	MPC · JPL
221740	2007 EX_{129}	—	March 9, 2007	Mount Lemmon	Mount Lemmon Survey	·	3.5 km	MPC · JPL
221741	2007 EW_{133}	—	March 9, 2007	Mount Lemmon	Mount Lemmon Survey	·	3.8 km	MPC · JPL
221742	2007 EJ_{137}	—	March 11, 2007	Kitt Peak	Spacewatch	·	2.5 km	MPC · JPL
221743	2007 EU_{139}	—	March 12, 2007	Kitt Peak	Spacewatch	KOR	2.1 km	MPC · JPL
221744	2007 EQ_{141}	—	March 12, 2007	Kitt Peak	Spacewatch	·	2.0 km	MPC · JPL
221745	2007 EK_{153}	—	March 12, 2007	Mount Lemmon	Mount Lemmon Survey	·	5.0 km	MPC · JPL
221746	2007 ER_{166}	—	March 11, 2007	Mount Lemmon	Mount Lemmon Survey	·	2.2 km	MPC · JPL
221747	2007 EU_{187}	—	March 15, 2007	Mount Lemmon	Mount Lemmon Survey	·	5.2 km	MPC · JPL
221748	2007 ES_{191}	—	March 13, 2007	Kitt Peak	Spacewatch	·	3.3 km	MPC · JPL
221749	2007 EQ_{196}	—	March 15, 2007	Kitt Peak	Spacewatch	GEF	1.9 km	MPC · JPL
221750	2007 ES_{198}	—	March 15, 2007	Catalina	CSS	·	2.7 km	MPC · JPL
221751	2007 EO_{202}	—	March 9, 2007	Mount Lemmon	Mount Lemmon Survey	·	3.8 km	MPC · JPL
221752	2007 EA_{209}	—	March 14, 2007	Kitt Peak	Spacewatch	EOS	3.1 km	MPC · JPL
221753	2007 EE_{210}	—	March 8, 2007	Palomar	NEAT	·	2.8 km	MPC · JPL
221754	2007 EX_{211}	—	March 8, 2007	Palomar	NEAT	KOR	1.9 km	MPC · JPL
221755	2007 EC_{220}	—	March 13, 2007	Kitt Peak	Spacewatch	HYG	4.6 km	MPC · JPL
221756	2007 EM_{221}	—	March 10, 2007	Mount Lemmon	Mount Lemmon Survey	KOR	1.5 km	MPC · JPL
221757	2007 FF_{7}	—	March 16, 2007	Anderson Mesa	LONEOS	KOR	2.3 km	MPC · JPL
221758	2007 FS_{12}	—	March 19, 2007	Catalina	CSS	·	5.5 km	MPC · JPL
221759	2007 FZ_{12}	—	March 19, 2007	Catalina	CSS	·	5.1 km	MPC · JPL
221760	2007 FH_{23}	—	March 20, 2007	Kitt Peak	Spacewatch	·	3.4 km	MPC · JPL
221761	2007 FX_{25}	—	March 20, 2007	Mount Lemmon	Mount Lemmon Survey	·	2.3 km	MPC · JPL
221762	2007 FK_{26}	—	March 20, 2007	Kitt Peak	Spacewatch	·	1.9 km	MPC · JPL
221763	2007 FH_{40}	—	March 20, 2007	Mount Lemmon	Mount Lemmon Survey	·	3.4 km	MPC · JPL
221764	2007 FE_{43}	—	March 27, 2007	Siding Spring	SSS	·	6.3 km	MPC · JPL
221765	2007 GC_{26}	—	April 14, 2007	Mount Lemmon	Mount Lemmon Survey	·	3.0 km	MPC · JPL
221766	2007 GG_{30}	—	April 14, 2007	Mount Lemmon	Mount Lemmon Survey	·	4.1 km	MPC · JPL
221767	2007 GT_{32}	—	April 15, 2007	Pises	Pises	·	3.1 km	MPC · JPL
221768	2007 GD_{34}	—	April 13, 2007	Siding Spring	SSS	·	3.7 km	MPC · JPL
221769 Cima Rest	2007 GQ_{51}	Cima Rest	April 15, 2007	Magasa	Tonincelli, M., Marinello, W.	·	3.7 km	MPC · JPL
221770	2007 GG_{60}	—	April 15, 2007	Kitt Peak	Spacewatch	·	3.8 km	MPC · JPL
221771	2007 GM_{62}	—	April 15, 2007	Kitt Peak	Spacewatch	·	4.9 km	MPC · JPL
221772	2007 GY_{64}	—	April 15, 2007	Kitt Peak	Spacewatch	·	4.1 km	MPC · JPL
221773	2007 GZ_{69}	—	April 15, 2007	Mount Lemmon	Mount Lemmon Survey	·	3.3 km	MPC · JPL
221774	2007 GB_{76}	—	April 15, 2007	Kitt Peak	Spacewatch	·	3.0 km	MPC · JPL
221775	2007 HA_{5}	—	April 19, 2007	7300	W. K. Y. Yeung	EOS	2.5 km	MPC · JPL
221776	2007 HL_{41}	—	April 20, 2007	Kitt Peak	Spacewatch	·	3.6 km	MPC · JPL
221777	2007 HY_{53}	—	April 22, 2007	Kitt Peak	Spacewatch	·	1.6 km	MPC · JPL
221778	2007 KC	—	May 16, 2007	Wrightwood	J. W. Young	3:2 · SHU	8.0 km	MPC · JPL
221779	2007 LG_{8}	—	June 9, 2007	Kitt Peak	Spacewatch	·	4.6 km	MPC · JPL
221780	2007 MD_{11}	—	June 21, 2007	Mount Lemmon	Mount Lemmon Survey	L4	10 km	MPC · JPL
221781	2007 RD_{62}	—	September 10, 2007	Mount Lemmon	Mount Lemmon Survey	KOR	2.1 km	MPC · JPL
221782	2007 RQ_{137}	—	September 14, 2007	Anderson Mesa	LONEOS	NYS	1.7 km	MPC · JPL
221783	2007 TL_{159}	—	October 9, 2007	Socorro	LINEAR	EUN	1.4 km	MPC · JPL
221784	2007 TW_{408}	—	October 14, 2007	Catalina	CSS	EOS	3.8 km	MPC · JPL
221785	2007 VJ_{6}	—	November 4, 2007	Mount Lemmon	Mount Lemmon Survey	L4	9.5 km	MPC · JPL
221786	2007 VA_{8}	—	November 4, 2007	Mount Lemmon	Mount Lemmon Survey	L4 · ERY	10 km	MPC · JPL
221787	2007 VZ_{30}	—	November 2, 2007	Kitt Peak	Spacewatch	AMO	200 m	MPC · JPL
221788	2007 YC_{30}	—	December 30, 2007	Catalina	CSS	H	830 m	MPC · JPL
221789	2008 AP_{21}	—	January 10, 2008	Mount Lemmon	Mount Lemmon Survey	NYS	1.5 km	MPC · JPL
221790	2008 AE_{66}	—	January 11, 2008	Kitt Peak	Spacewatch	·	950 m	MPC · JPL
221791	2008 AN_{114}	—	January 10, 2008	Kitt Peak	Spacewatch	·	2.7 km	MPC · JPL
221792	2008 BY_{9}	—	January 16, 2008	Kitt Peak	Spacewatch	·	1.0 km	MPC · JPL
221793	2008 BW_{31}	—	January 30, 2008	Mount Lemmon	Mount Lemmon Survey	NYS	1.4 km	MPC · JPL
221794	2008 BC_{34}	—	January 30, 2008	Kitt Peak	Spacewatch	·	1.6 km	MPC · JPL
221795	2008 BM_{36}	—	January 30, 2008	Kitt Peak	Spacewatch	·	1.9 km	MPC · JPL
221796	2008 BB_{38}	—	January 31, 2008	Mount Lemmon	Mount Lemmon Survey	·	920 m	MPC · JPL
221797	2008 BO_{47}	—	January 30, 2008	Mount Lemmon	Mount Lemmon Survey	·	1.4 km	MPC · JPL
221798	2008 CC_{7}	—	February 1, 2008	Kitt Peak	Spacewatch	·	2.2 km	MPC · JPL
221799	2008 CM_{23}	—	February 1, 2008	Kitt Peak	Spacewatch	NYS	1.7 km	MPC · JPL
221800	2008 CJ_{44}	—	February 2, 2008	Kitt Peak	Spacewatch	MAS	1.0 km	MPC · JPL

== 221801–221900 ==
back to top

Designation			Discovery			Properties		Ref
Permanent	Provisional	Named after	Date	Site	Discoverer(s)	Category	Diam.	Ref
221801	2008 CX_{65}	—	February 8, 2008	Mount Lemmon	Mount Lemmon Survey	·	690 m	MPC · JPL
221802	2008 CD_{86}	—	February 7, 2008	Mount Lemmon	Mount Lemmon Survey	·	850 m	MPC · JPL
221803	2008 CK_{89}	—	February 7, 2008	Kitt Peak	Spacewatch	·	1.9 km	MPC · JPL
221804	2008 CF_{124}	—	February 7, 2008	Mount Lemmon	Mount Lemmon Survey	·	1.4 km	MPC · JPL
221805	2008 CE_{126}	—	February 8, 2008	Kitt Peak	Spacewatch	·	1.6 km	MPC · JPL
221806	2008 CB_{145}	—	February 9, 2008	Kitt Peak	Spacewatch	·	1.3 km	MPC · JPL
221807	2008 CM_{156}	—	February 9, 2008	Kitt Peak	Spacewatch	·	920 m	MPC · JPL
221808	2008 CY_{194}	—	February 13, 2008	Mount Lemmon	Mount Lemmon Survey	·	1.1 km	MPC · JPL
221809	2008 CD_{196}	—	February 10, 2008	Mount Lemmon	Mount Lemmon Survey	V	850 m	MPC · JPL
221810	2008 CJ_{199}	—	February 13, 2008	Mount Lemmon	Mount Lemmon Survey	MAS	940 m	MPC · JPL
221811	2008 CW_{200}	—	February 10, 2008	Mount Lemmon	Mount Lemmon Survey	·	890 m	MPC · JPL
221812	2008 DN_{4}	—	February 28, 2008	Catalina	CSS	H	760 m	MPC · JPL
221813	2008 DN_{16}	—	February 27, 2008	Catalina	CSS	H	750 m	MPC · JPL
221814	2008 DK_{39}	—	February 27, 2008	Mount Lemmon	Mount Lemmon Survey	·	1.3 km	MPC · JPL
221815	2008 EY_{4}	—	March 3, 2008	Grove Creek	Tozzi, F.	·	2.6 km	MPC · JPL
221816	2008 EL_{7}	—	March 1, 2008	Catalina	CSS	H	690 m	MPC · JPL
221817	2008 EB_{15}	—	March 1, 2008	Kitt Peak	Spacewatch	·	1.7 km	MPC · JPL
221818	2008 ES_{15}	—	March 1, 2008	Kitt Peak	Spacewatch	NYS	1.6 km	MPC · JPL
221819	2008 EV_{15}	—	March 1, 2008	Kitt Peak	Spacewatch	·	720 m	MPC · JPL
221820	2008 EX_{21}	—	March 2, 2008	Kitt Peak	Spacewatch	·	1.2 km	MPC · JPL
221821	2008 EU_{28}	—	March 4, 2008	Mount Lemmon	Mount Lemmon Survey	·	2.3 km	MPC · JPL
221822	2008 EP_{36}	—	March 3, 2008	Kitt Peak	Spacewatch	·	1.4 km	MPC · JPL
221823	2008 EB_{41}	—	March 4, 2008	Catalina	CSS	PHO	1.6 km	MPC · JPL
221824	2008 EL_{46}	—	March 5, 2008	Mount Lemmon	Mount Lemmon Survey	·	1.0 km	MPC · JPL
221825	2008 EG_{58}	—	March 7, 2008	Mount Lemmon	Mount Lemmon Survey	EUN	1.9 km	MPC · JPL
221826	2008 EE_{73}	—	March 7, 2008	Kitt Peak	Spacewatch	·	1.9 km	MPC · JPL
221827	2008 EO_{78}	—	March 7, 2008	Kitt Peak	Spacewatch	fast	990 m	MPC · JPL
221828	2008 ER_{79}	—	March 8, 2008	Kitt Peak	Spacewatch	·	2.3 km	MPC · JPL
221829	2008 EG_{109}	—	March 7, 2008	Catalina	CSS	·	1.2 km	MPC · JPL
221830	2008 EX_{113}	—	March 8, 2008	Mount Lemmon	Mount Lemmon Survey	·	1.6 km	MPC · JPL
221831	2008 EZ_{121}	—	March 9, 2008	Kitt Peak	Spacewatch	·	1 km	MPC · JPL
221832	2008 EC_{142}	—	March 12, 2008	Kitt Peak	Spacewatch	·	2.0 km	MPC · JPL
221833	2008 ER_{151}	—	March 8, 2008	Mount Lemmon	Mount Lemmon Survey	MAS	960 m	MPC · JPL
221834	2008 EY_{151}	—	March 10, 2008	Kitt Peak	Spacewatch	NYS	1.3 km	MPC · JPL
221835	2008 EJ_{158}	—	March 9, 2008	Kitt Peak	Spacewatch	·	1.3 km	MPC · JPL
221836	2008 EC_{160}	—	March 13, 2008	Kitt Peak	Spacewatch	MAS	990 m	MPC · JPL
221837	2008 FO_{1}	—	March 25, 2008	Kitt Peak	Spacewatch	·	1.2 km	MPC · JPL
221838	2008 FE_{25}	—	March 27, 2008	Mount Lemmon	Mount Lemmon Survey	·	1.6 km	MPC · JPL
221839	2008 FX_{26}	—	March 27, 2008	Kitt Peak	Spacewatch	·	930 m	MPC · JPL
221840	2008 FH_{30}	—	March 28, 2008	Kitt Peak	Spacewatch	NYS	1.3 km	MPC · JPL
221841	2008 FZ_{46}	—	March 28, 2008	Mount Lemmon	Mount Lemmon Survey	MAS	710 m	MPC · JPL
221842	2008 FD_{62}	—	March 26, 2008	Mount Lemmon	Mount Lemmon Survey	·	1.6 km	MPC · JPL
221843	2008 FZ_{65}	—	March 28, 2008	Mount Lemmon	Mount Lemmon Survey	·	880 m	MPC · JPL
221844	2008 FT_{67}	—	March 28, 2008	Kitt Peak	Spacewatch	·	1.2 km	MPC · JPL
221845	2008 FK_{71}	—	March 29, 2008	Kitt Peak	Spacewatch	MAR	1.3 km	MPC · JPL
221846	2008 FR_{80}	—	March 27, 2008	Mount Lemmon	Mount Lemmon Survey	·	1.2 km	MPC · JPL
221847	2008 FF_{83}	—	March 28, 2008	Kitt Peak	Spacewatch	·	2.1 km	MPC · JPL
221848	2008 FB_{105}	—	March 30, 2008	Kitt Peak	Spacewatch	·	4.4 km	MPC · JPL
221849	2008 FQ_{109}	—	March 31, 2008	Mount Lemmon	Mount Lemmon Survey	·	2.6 km	MPC · JPL
221850	2008 FL_{115}	—	March 31, 2008	Mount Lemmon	Mount Lemmon Survey	·	1.0 km	MPC · JPL
221851	2008 FG_{125}	—	March 30, 2008	Kitt Peak	Spacewatch	LIX	6.3 km	MPC · JPL
221852	2008 FC_{128}	—	March 28, 2008	Kitt Peak	Spacewatch	·	1.0 km	MPC · JPL
221853 Gábrisgyula	2008 GB	Gábrisgyula	April 1, 2008	Piszkéstető	K. Sárneczky	·	2.5 km	MPC · JPL
221854	2008 GW	—	April 2, 2008	Farra d'Isonzo	Farra d'Isonzo	·	1.6 km	MPC · JPL
221855	2008 GJ_{6}	—	April 1, 2008	Kitt Peak	Spacewatch	·	1.6 km	MPC · JPL
221856	2008 GA_{8}	—	April 1, 2008	Kitt Peak	Spacewatch	MAS	1.1 km	MPC · JPL
221857	2008 GF_{10}	—	April 1, 2008	Kitt Peak	Spacewatch	·	1.6 km	MPC · JPL
221858	2008 GS_{11}	—	April 1, 2008	Kitt Peak	Spacewatch	·	3.9 km	MPC · JPL
221859	2008 GT_{20}	—	April 11, 2008	Catalina	CSS	PHO	1.6 km	MPC · JPL
221860	2008 GM_{25}	—	April 1, 2008	Mount Lemmon	Mount Lemmon Survey	·	2.2 km	MPC · JPL
221861	2008 GR_{59}	—	April 5, 2008	Kitt Peak	Spacewatch	·	1.4 km	MPC · JPL
221862	2008 GD_{65}	—	April 6, 2008	Kitt Peak	Spacewatch	·	1.5 km	MPC · JPL
221863	2008 GD_{70}	—	April 6, 2008	Mount Lemmon	Mount Lemmon Survey	·	1.3 km	MPC · JPL
221864	2008 GS_{76}	—	April 7, 2008	Kitt Peak	Spacewatch	·	2.2 km	MPC · JPL
221865	2008 GV_{78}	—	April 7, 2008	Kitt Peak	Spacewatch	MAS	840 m	MPC · JPL
221866	2008 GB_{81}	—	April 7, 2008	Kitt Peak	Spacewatch	·	1.6 km	MPC · JPL
221867	2008 GR_{90}	—	April 6, 2008	Mount Lemmon	Mount Lemmon Survey	·	1.3 km	MPC · JPL
221868	2008 GE_{94}	—	April 7, 2008	Kitt Peak	Spacewatch	·	2.8 km	MPC · JPL
221869	2008 GM_{115}	—	April 11, 2008	Kitt Peak	Spacewatch	·	860 m	MPC · JPL
221870	2008 GB_{122}	—	April 13, 2008	Kitt Peak	Spacewatch	·	1.7 km	MPC · JPL
221871	2008 GK_{127}	—	April 14, 2008	Mount Lemmon	Mount Lemmon Survey	EOS	3.1 km	MPC · JPL
221872	2008 GO_{130}	—	April 6, 2008	Kitt Peak	Spacewatch	·	1.6 km	MPC · JPL
221873	2008 GA_{132}	—	April 6, 2008	Mount Lemmon	Mount Lemmon Survey	·	3.0 km	MPC · JPL
221874	2008 GD_{132}	—	April 7, 2008	Kitt Peak	Spacewatch	·	1.2 km	MPC · JPL
221875	2008 HS_{1}	—	April 24, 2008	Kitt Peak	Spacewatch	V	770 m	MPC · JPL
221876	2008 HG_{12}	—	April 24, 2008	Catalina	CSS	·	1.6 km	MPC · JPL
221877	2008 HG_{16}	—	April 25, 2008	Kitt Peak	Spacewatch	·	2.7 km	MPC · JPL
221878	2008 HY_{16}	—	April 25, 2008	Kitt Peak	Spacewatch	·	1.9 km	MPC · JPL
221879	2008 HJ_{18}	—	April 26, 2008	Kitt Peak	Spacewatch	·	3.7 km	MPC · JPL
221880	2008 HW_{32}	—	April 29, 2008	Mount Lemmon	Mount Lemmon Survey	·	4.6 km	MPC · JPL
221881	2008 HP_{37}	—	April 29, 2008	La Sagra	OAM	·	2.3 km	MPC · JPL
221882	2008 HY_{39}	—	April 26, 2008	Mount Lemmon	Mount Lemmon Survey	·	1.4 km	MPC · JPL
221883	2008 HV_{44}	—	April 28, 2008	Kitt Peak	Spacewatch	·	930 m	MPC · JPL
221884	2008 HH_{45}	—	April 28, 2008	Kitt Peak	Spacewatch	·	1.1 km	MPC · JPL
221885	2008 HA_{55}	—	April 29, 2008	Kitt Peak	Spacewatch	THM	3.0 km	MPC · JPL
221886	2008 HJ_{61}	—	April 30, 2008	Mount Lemmon	Mount Lemmon Survey	·	2.4 km	MPC · JPL
221887	2008 HW_{67}	—	April 30, 2008	Catalina	CSS	·	2.8 km	MPC · JPL
221888	2008 HM_{69}	—	April 26, 2008	Mount Lemmon	Mount Lemmon Survey	·	2.4 km	MPC · JPL
221889	2008 JR_{10}	—	May 3, 2008	Mount Lemmon	Mount Lemmon Survey	·	1.8 km	MPC · JPL
221890	2008 JX_{11}	—	May 3, 2008	Kitt Peak	Spacewatch	·	1.2 km	MPC · JPL
221891	2008 JD_{15}	—	May 5, 2008	Vail-Jarnac	Jarnac	·	1.2 km	MPC · JPL
221892	2008 JY_{17}	—	May 4, 2008	Kitt Peak	Spacewatch	·	3.9 km	MPC · JPL
221893	2008 JU_{19}	—	May 5, 2008	Bisei SG Center	BATTeRS	CYB	7.0 km	MPC · JPL
221894	2008 JK_{35}	—	May 12, 2008	Grove Creek	Tozzi, F.	·	2.0 km	MPC · JPL
221895	2008 JA_{36}	—	May 3, 2008	Mount Lemmon	Mount Lemmon Survey	·	1.5 km	MPC · JPL
221896	2008 KO_{9}	—	May 27, 2008	Kitt Peak	Spacewatch	·	1.7 km	MPC · JPL
221897	2008 KQ_{10}	—	May 29, 2008	Mount Lemmon	Mount Lemmon Survey	·	3.6 km	MPC · JPL
221898	2008 KN_{13}	—	May 27, 2008	Kitt Peak	Spacewatch	THM	2.8 km	MPC · JPL
221899	2008 KC_{17}	—	May 27, 2008	Kitt Peak	Spacewatch	EMA	3.3 km	MPC · JPL
221900	2008 KD_{31}	—	May 29, 2008	Kitt Peak	Spacewatch	·	2.3 km	MPC · JPL

== 221901–222000 ==
back to top

Designation			Discovery			Properties		Ref
Permanent	Provisional	Named after	Date	Site	Discoverer(s)	Category	Diam.	Ref
221901	2008 KZ_{32}	—	May 29, 2008	Mount Lemmon	Mount Lemmon Survey	·	1.9 km	MPC · JPL
221902	2008 KL_{38}	—	May 30, 2008	Kitt Peak	Spacewatch	·	1.4 km	MPC · JPL
221903	2008 KY_{38}	—	May 30, 2008	Kitt Peak	Spacewatch	·	4.5 km	MPC · JPL
221904	2008 KN_{42}	—	May 31, 2008	Kitt Peak	Spacewatch	·	4.7 km	MPC · JPL
221905	2008 LA_{8}	—	June 4, 2008	Kitt Peak	Spacewatch	·	1.3 km	MPC · JPL
221906	2008 LN_{9}	—	June 4, 2008	Kitt Peak	Spacewatch	LIX	5.6 km	MPC · JPL
221907	2008 LP_{10}	—	June 6, 2008	Kitt Peak	Spacewatch	KOR	1.5 km	MPC · JPL
221908 Agastrophus	2008 QQ	Agastrophus	August 21, 2008	Marly	P. Kocher	L4	10 km	MPC · JPL
221909	2008 QY_{14}	—	August 24, 2008	Pla D'Arguines	R. Ferrando	L4	10 km	MPC · JPL
221910	2008 QT_{23}	—	August 31, 2008	Hibiscus	S. F. Hönig, Teamo, N.	L4	20 km	MPC · JPL
221911	2008 QX_{41}	—	August 27, 2008	La Sagra	OAM	L4	10 km	MPC · JPL
221912	2008 RU_{25}	—	September 5, 2008	Needville	J. Dellinger, Sexton, C.	L4	12 km	MPC · JPL
221913	2008 RS_{28}	—	September 2, 2008	Kitt Peak	Spacewatch	L4	10 km	MPC · JPL
221914	2008 RW_{33}	—	September 2, 2008	Kitt Peak	Spacewatch	L4	9.9 km	MPC · JPL
221915	2008 SH_{8}	—	September 22, 2008	Socorro	LINEAR	L4	10 km	MPC · JPL
221916	2008 SQ_{81}	—	September 23, 2008	Marly	P. Kocher	L4	10 km	MPC · JPL
221917 Opites	2008 SD_{83}	Opites	September 26, 2008	Taunus	Karge, S., E. Schwab	L4	20 km	MPC · JPL
221918	2008 UU_{34}	—	October 20, 2008	Kitt Peak	Spacewatch	·	2.8 km	MPC · JPL
221919	2008 WZ_{92}	—	November 25, 2008	Farra d'Isonzo	Farra d'Isonzo	·	2.2 km	MPC · JPL
221920	2009 KF_{5}	—	May 23, 2009	Catalina	CSS	·	2.1 km	MPC · JPL
221921	2009 MD_{3}	—	June 17, 2009	Kitt Peak	Spacewatch	EOS	2.6 km	MPC · JPL
221922	2009 OJ	—	July 16, 2009	La Sagra	OAM	·	2.4 km	MPC · JPL
221923 Jayeff	2009 OD_{3}	Jayeff	July 22, 2009	Moorook	Falla, N.	·	1.6 km	MPC · JPL
221924	2009 OE_{5}	—	July 23, 2009	Tiki	Teamo, N.	·	970 m	MPC · JPL
221925	2009 ON_{6}	—	July 26, 2009	La Sagra	OAM	·	1.1 km	MPC · JPL
221926	2009 OA_{9}	—	July 28, 2009	La Sagra	OAM	·	840 m	MPC · JPL
221927	2009 OQ_{9}	—	July 27, 2009	La Sagra	OAM	·	2.1 km	MPC · JPL
221928	2009 OD_{13}	—	July 27, 2009	Kitt Peak	Spacewatch	·	4.1 km	MPC · JPL
221929	2009 OM_{13}	—	July 27, 2009	Kitt Peak	Spacewatch	(12739)	2.3 km	MPC · JPL
221930	2009 OH_{15}	—	July 29, 2009	Tiki	Teamo, N.	CLA	2.0 km	MPC · JPL
221931	2009 OD_{18}	—	July 28, 2009	Kitt Peak	Spacewatch	·	830 m	MPC · JPL
221932	2009 OL_{18}	—	July 28, 2009	Kitt Peak	Spacewatch	NYS	1.5 km	MPC · JPL
221933	2009 PE	—	August 1, 2009	Hibiscus	Teamo, N.	·	730 m	MPC · JPL
221934	2009 PK_{1}	—	August 14, 2009	Dauban	Kugel, F.	·	1.8 km	MPC · JPL
221935	2009 QF_{2}	—	August 17, 2009	Črni Vrh	Mikuž, H.	·	3.9 km	MPC · JPL
221936	2009 QP_{35}	—	August 29, 2009	La Sagra	OAM	·	950 m	MPC · JPL
221937	2066 P-L	—	September 24, 1960	Palomar	C. J. van Houten, I. van Houten-Groeneveld, T. Gehrels	·	2.4 km	MPC · JPL
221938	3019 P-L	—	September 24, 1960	Palomar	C. J. van Houten, I. van Houten-Groeneveld, T. Gehrels	·	4.6 km	MPC · JPL
221939	6017 P-L	—	September 24, 1960	Palomar	C. J. van Houten, I. van Houten-Groeneveld, T. Gehrels	·	1.4 km	MPC · JPL
221940	6508 P-L	—	September 24, 1960	Palomar	C. J. van Houten, I. van Houten-Groeneveld, T. Gehrels	·	920 m	MPC · JPL
221941	1146 T-2	—	September 29, 1973	Palomar	C. J. van Houten, I. van Houten-Groeneveld, T. Gehrels	·	1.1 km	MPC · JPL
221942	1543 T-2	—	September 29, 1973	Palomar	C. J. van Houten, I. van Houten-Groeneveld, T. Gehrels	NYS	1.4 km	MPC · JPL
221943	1190 T-3	—	October 17, 1977	Palomar	C. J. van Houten, I. van Houten-Groeneveld, T. Gehrels	·	1.4 km	MPC · JPL
221944	2339 T-3	—	October 16, 1977	Palomar	C. J. van Houten, I. van Houten-Groeneveld, T. Gehrels	·	3.5 km	MPC · JPL
221945	3227 T-3	—	October 16, 1977	Palomar	C. J. van Houten, I. van Houten-Groeneveld, T. Gehrels	·	3.1 km	MPC · JPL
221946	1990 KL_{1}	—	May 21, 1990	Kitt Peak	Spacewatch	H	990 m	MPC · JPL
221947	1992 DW_{9}	—	February 29, 1992	La Silla	UESAC	·	2.7 km	MPC · JPL
221948	1993 FO_{59}	—	March 19, 1993	La Silla	UESAC	·	4.5 km	MPC · JPL
221949	1993 SJ_{9}	—	September 22, 1993	La Silla	H. Debehogne, E. W. Elst	·	5.0 km	MPC · JPL
221950	1993 TF_{15}	—	October 9, 1993	La Silla	E. W. Elst	EMA	5.4 km	MPC · JPL
221951	1993 TZ_{33}	—	October 9, 1993	La Silla	E. W. Elst	·	3.7 km	MPC · JPL
221952	1994 PU_{15}	—	August 10, 1994	La Silla	E. W. Elst	·	1.6 km	MPC · JPL
221953	1994 TC_{13}	—	October 10, 1994	Kitt Peak	Spacewatch	·	2.1 km	MPC · JPL
221954	1994 VA_{5}	—	November 5, 1994	Kitt Peak	Spacewatch	·	1.5 km	MPC · JPL
221955	1995 CD_{8}	—	February 2, 1995	Kitt Peak	Spacewatch	·	1.2 km	MPC · JPL
221956	1995 FW_{5}	—	March 23, 1995	Kitt Peak	Spacewatch	EOS	3.6 km	MPC · JPL
221957	1995 FZ_{19}	—	March 31, 1995	Kitt Peak	Spacewatch	·	3.5 km	MPC · JPL
221958	1995 MQ_{6}	—	June 28, 1995	Kitt Peak	Spacewatch	·	1.0 km	MPC · JPL
221959	1995 OP_{15}	—	July 26, 1995	Kitt Peak	Spacewatch	·	2.1 km	MPC · JPL
221960	1995 SZ_{9}	—	September 17, 1995	Kitt Peak	Spacewatch	·	2.2 km	MPC · JPL
221961	1995 SY_{26}	—	September 19, 1995	Kitt Peak	Spacewatch	·	1.0 km	MPC · JPL
221962	1995 SQ_{32}	—	September 21, 1995	Kitt Peak	Spacewatch	·	970 m	MPC · JPL
221963	1995 SY_{35}	—	September 23, 1995	Kitt Peak	Spacewatch	·	680 m	MPC · JPL
221964	1995 SF_{37}	—	September 24, 1995	Kitt Peak	Spacewatch	·	930 m	MPC · JPL
221965	1995 SA_{39}	—	September 24, 1995	Kitt Peak	Spacewatch	·	2.7 km	MPC · JPL
221966	1995 SW_{40}	—	September 25, 1995	Kitt Peak	Spacewatch	·	810 m	MPC · JPL
221967	1995 SU_{62}	—	September 25, 1995	Kitt Peak	Spacewatch	DOR	2.9 km	MPC · JPL
221968	1995 SF_{75}	—	September 19, 1995	Kitt Peak	Spacewatch	·	3.0 km	MPC · JPL
221969	1995 US_{20}	—	October 19, 1995	Kitt Peak	Spacewatch	·	2.5 km	MPC · JPL
221970	1995 UH_{22}	—	October 19, 1995	Kitt Peak	Spacewatch	AGN	1.5 km	MPC · JPL
221971	1995 UN_{22}	—	October 19, 1995	Kitt Peak	Spacewatch	·	970 m	MPC · JPL
221972	1995 UT_{22}	—	October 19, 1995	Kitt Peak	Spacewatch	·	2.1 km	MPC · JPL
221973	1995 UQ_{55}	—	October 22, 1995	Kitt Peak	Spacewatch	·	2.4 km	MPC · JPL
221974	1995 VV_{4}	—	November 14, 1995	Kitt Peak	Spacewatch	·	2.7 km	MPC · JPL
221975	1995 VK_{9}	—	November 14, 1995	Kitt Peak	Spacewatch	·	2.0 km	MPC · JPL
221976	1995 VL_{11}	—	November 15, 1995	Kitt Peak	Spacewatch	NEM	2.8 km	MPC · JPL
221977	1995 WG_{1}	—	November 16, 1995	Kuma Kogen	A. Nakamura	·	2.2 km	MPC · JPL
221978	1995 WJ_{16}	—	November 17, 1995	Kitt Peak	Spacewatch	·	1.3 km	MPC · JPL
221979	1995 WA_{27}	—	November 18, 1995	Kitt Peak	Spacewatch	·	930 m	MPC · JPL
221980	1996 EO	—	March 15, 1996	Haleakala	NEAT	APO · PHA	430 m	MPC · JPL
221981	1996 EB_{13}	—	March 11, 1996	Kitt Peak	Spacewatch	T_{j} (2.99) · EUP	4.4 km	MPC · JPL
221982	1996 GW_{4}	—	April 11, 1996	Kitt Peak	Spacewatch	3:2 · SHU	8.1 km	MPC · JPL
221983	1996 PJ_{2}	—	August 12, 1996	Rand	G. R. Viscome	·	2.3 km	MPC · JPL
221984	1996 XU_{21}	—	December 8, 1996	Kitt Peak	Spacewatch	·	2.3 km	MPC · JPL
221985	1997 BR_{5}	—	January 31, 1997	Prescott	P. G. Comba	·	1.3 km	MPC · JPL
221986	1997 CR_{2}	—	February 2, 1997	Kitt Peak	Spacewatch	·	3.4 km	MPC · JPL
221987	1997 CS_{12}	—	February 3, 1997	Kitt Peak	Spacewatch	MRX	1.6 km	MPC · JPL
221988	1997 EE_{24}	—	March 5, 1997	Kitt Peak	Spacewatch	·	1.1 km	MPC · JPL
221989	1997 GV_{1}	—	April 7, 1997	Kitt Peak	Spacewatch	·	1.2 km	MPC · JPL
221990	1997 GP_{18}	—	April 3, 1997	Socorro	LINEAR	·	1.4 km	MPC · JPL
221991	1997 GB_{21}	—	April 6, 1997	Socorro	LINEAR	(2076)	1.3 km	MPC · JPL
221992	1997 LL_{5}	—	June 8, 1997	Kitt Peak	Spacewatch	EOS	2.6 km	MPC · JPL
221993	1997 MM_{7}	—	June 27, 1997	Kitt Peak	Spacewatch	·	4.7 km	MPC · JPL
221994	1997 PT_{4}	—	August 11, 1997	Costitx	Á. López J., R. Pacheco	·	2.1 km	MPC · JPL
221995	1997 TT_{21}	—	October 4, 1997	Kitt Peak	Spacewatch	L4	10 km	MPC · JPL
221996	1997 YN_{1}	—	December 19, 1997	Xinglong	SCAP	·	2.8 km	MPC · JPL
221997	1998 AD_{1}	—	January 1, 1998	Kitt Peak	Spacewatch	EUN	2.2 km	MPC · JPL
221998	1998 DL_{29}	—	February 28, 1998	Kitt Peak	Spacewatch	·	2.1 km	MPC · JPL
221999	1998 EE_{18}	—	March 3, 1998	La Silla	E. W. Elst	·	4.4 km	MPC · JPL
222000	1998 FL_{137}	—	March 28, 1998	Socorro	LINEAR	(18466)	3.1 km	MPC · JPL

back to top

== See also ==
- Meanings of minor-planet names: 221001–222000
