= Khitruk =

Khitruk (Russian: Хитрук, from хитрый = cunning) is a gender-neutral Russian surname. It may refer to

- Anastasia Khitruk (born 1975), Russian-American violin player
- Andrey Khitruk (1944–2019), Russian pianist and musicologist, father of Anastasia
- Fyodor Khitruk (1917–2012), Russian animator, father of Andrey and grandfather of Anastasia

== See also ==
- Khitrov
- Khitrik
