= Galina Khitrova =

Russian-American physicist (1959–2016)

Galina Khitrova (1959 – June 4, 2016) was a Russian-American physicist and optical scientist known for her research on cavity quantum electrodynamics, excitons, nonlinear optics, quantum dots, and vacuum Rabi oscillations. She was a professor of optical sciences at the University of Arizona.

== Education and career ==
Khitrova was born in Saint Petersburg, and has degrees in physics from Yerevan State University, Brooklyn College, and New York University, where she completed her Ph.D. She came to the University of Arizona as a researcher in 1986, married Arizona professor Professor Hyatt M. Gibbs in 1986, was given tenure as an associate professor in 1997, and became full professor in 2002.

== Recognition ==
Khitrova was named a Fellow of The Optical Society in 2007, "for leadership in research in fundamental optical phenomena in semiconductor nanostructures". She was named a Fellow of the American Physical Society (APS) in 2012, after a nomination by the APS Division of Laser Science, "for fundamental studies of pump probe spectroscopy of atomic vapors and light-matter coupling of cavity fields with quantum wells and dots. In particular, for demonstrating the quantum regime of semiconductor cavity quantum electrodynamics via the vacuum Rabi splitting between a single quantum dot and the field in a photonic crystal nanocavity."
