= Hyatt M. Gibbs =

Hyatt M. Gibbs (6 August 1938 – 3 September 2012) was a notable physicist and professor at the University of Arizona College of Optical Sciences. Well known for research in nonlinear optics and quantum optics, he authored a book on optical bistability, and was a recipient of the Humboldt Research Award and Michelson Medal.

== Education ==
Gibbs attended Mars Hill College and North Carolina State University in his home state, where he earned an A.A. degree in 1958 and a B.S. degree in 1960, respectively. In 1965, he earned a Ph.D. in physics from the University of California at Berkeley with his thesis on Total Spin-Exchange Cross-Sections for Alkali Atoms from Optical Pumping Experiments.

== Career ==
After earning his Ph.D., Gibbs remained at U.C. Berkeley as an Acting Assistant Professor until 1967. He then joined Bell Labs in Berkeley Heights, New Jersey where he worked until 1980. During his work there he collaborated on numerous experiments, including research on optical energy transfer in crystals with Samuel L. McCall and Steven Chu, a Nobel Prize winner and the United States Secretary of Energy. For one year during this period, 1975 to 1976, he was an exchange scientist at Philips in Eindhoven, Holland. He was also a visiting lecturer at Princeton University from 1978 to 1979.

In 1980 he moved to Tucson, Arizona to become a professor at the Optical Sciences Center at the University of Arizona. Here he founded the Optical Circuitry Cooperative in 1984, which conducted research relevant to optical processing, funded jointly by industry leaders in optics and optoelectronics. He remained its director until 1991 when the role was given to his collaborator, Dr. Nasser Peyghambarian. Gibbs was able to concentrate more fully on his research, particularly his work with Dr. Galina Khitrova (whom he married in 1986) and Dr. Stephan W. Koch on the quantum nano-optics of semiconductors. Gibbs became a professor emeritus in 2011, but continued his work until his death in 2012.

== Honors ==
- Humboldt Research Award, 1998
- Franklin Institute, Michelson Medal, 1984
- American Physical Society, Fellow
- Optical Society of America, Fellow
- Franklin Institute, Fellow
- IEEE, Senior Member
- American Association for the Advancement of Science, Fellow

== Asteroid Hyatt ==
The unusual main-belt asteroid 221628 Hyatt was named in his honor on 3 July 2012 (M.P.C. 79912), just two months before he died. The asteroid was discovered by his son Alex Gibbs of the Catalina Sky Survey, who proposed the name to the Minor Planet Center of the International Astronomical Union.

== Personal life ==
Gibbs' first marriage was to Lethia, with whom he had a son, Alex, and a daughter, Vanetta. His second marriage was to Galina Khitrova, with whom he collaborated professionally. On September 3, 2012, Hyatt M. Gibbs died in France at the age of 74 from mesothelioma complications.
