= Anna Khitrik =

Belarusian actress, singer and the lead vocalist born 1980

Anna Sergeyevna Khitrik
- Анна Сергеевна Хитрик
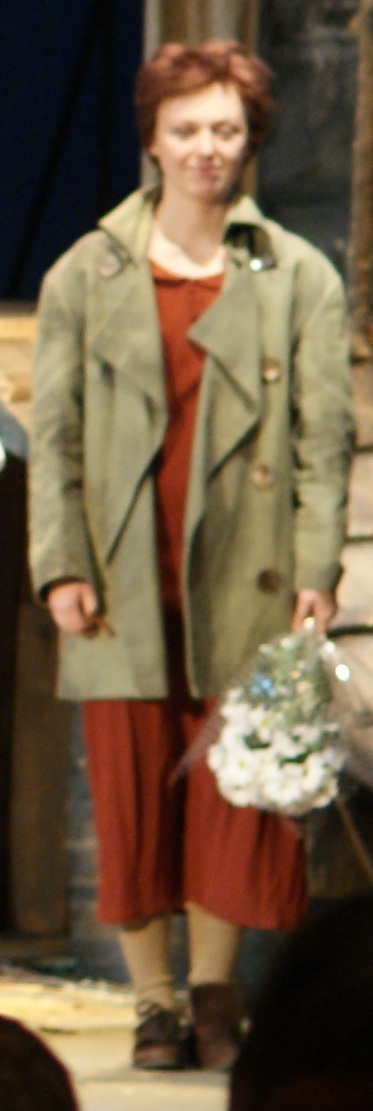
- Anna Khitrik in 2013
- Born: June 25, 1980 (age 46); Chelyabinsk, Russian SFSR, Soviet Union
- Education: Belarusian State Academy of Arts
- Occupations: Actress; Singer

Anna Sergeyevna Khitrik (Belarusian: Ганна Сяргееўна Хітрык, romanized: Hanna Siarheyewna Khitryk; born June 25, 1980) is a Belarusian actress, singer and the lead vocalist of the bands DetiDetey and S°unduk.

== Early life and education ==
Anna Khitrik pursued her passion for the performing arts at the Belarusian State Academy of Arts, specializing in puppet theater acting. During her third year, she was invited by director Alexander Gartsuyev to perform in the play "My Brother, Syaman…" at the Yanka Kupala National Academic Theatre. After graduating in 2001, she joined the theater's troupe and also collaborated with the Belarusian State Youth Theatre. Additionally, Khitrik taught at a theater-focused school, nurturing young talents.

== Career ==
=== Theater ===
After graduating in 2001, Khitrik joined the Yanka Kupala National Academic Theatre, where she participated in various productions. She also collaborated with the Belarusian State Youth Theatre and was involved in theater education.

=== Music ===
In 2005, Khitrik co-founded the band DetiDetey along with fellow actors from Minsk theaters. The group was known for incorporating theatrical elements into their music and released three albums:

- Konverty dlya snov (2007)
- OtLichno (2008)
- Rukh (2010)

Following the band's hiatus in 2010, she initiated a new project, S°unduk, which continued exploring diverse musical styles. The band released several albums, including:

- Tom pervyy (2011)
- Tom vtoroy (2013)
- Nashe Vremya (Tom tretiy) (2013)

=== Television ===
Khitrik worked as a puppeteer on the children's television program Kalykhanka until 2009. In 2010, she participated in the musical project "U neskladovaye."

=== Film ===
Khitrik has appeared in both Belarusian and Russian films and television productions, including:

- Lika, or Demob Story (2004) as Lika
- Sniper: Weapon of Retaliation (2009) as Berta
- Once Upon a Time in Barakhlyandiya (2010) as Princess Bulvineya
- White Wolves (2012) (Episode 10)
- The Queen of Beauty (2015)

== Awards and recognition ==
- At the VI Moscow International Television and Theater Festival "Living Fairy Tale," Khitrik was awarded in the category "For Talented Performance of a Female Role" for her role in the musical "Africa."
- At the VII International Television and Theater Festival "This Victory Day…" in Moscow (2005), she received the prize "For Performance of a Female Role" for her portrayal of Julia in the play "Ballad of Love."

== Personal life ==
In 2017, Khitrik emigrated to Israel. In November 2018, she publicly shared her diagnosis of stage 3 breast cancer, expressing optimism about her treatment and recovery.
