= 221628 Hyatt =

Main-belt asteroid

Discovery
- Discovered by: A. R. Gibbs
- Discovery site: Catalina Sky Srvy.
- Discovery date: 26 December 2006

Designations
- Pronunciation: /ˈhaɪ.ət/
- Named after: Hyatt M. Gibbs (American physicist)
- Alternative designations: 2006 YE_{13} · 2001 ES_{12} 2005 WG_{1}
- Minor planet category: main-belt · (outer) background

Orbital characteristics
- Epoch 23 March 2018 (JD 2458200.5)
- Uncertainty parameter 0
- Observation arc: 17.16 yr (6,266 d)
- Aphelion: 3.9134 AU
- Perihelion: 2.3515 AU
- Semi-major axis: 3.1324 AU
- Eccentricity: 0.2493
- Orbital period (sidereal): 5.54 yr (2,025 d)
- Mean anomaly: 356.66°
- Mean motion: 0° 10^{m} 40.08^{s} / day
- Inclination: 32.475°
- Longitude of ascending node: 357.84°
- Argument of perihelion: 176.49°
- T_{Jupiter}: 2.9290

Physical characteristics
- Mean diameter: 3.8 km (est. at 0.22); 7.4 km (est. at 0.057); 9 km (est. at 0.039)
- Absolute magnitude (H): 14.4

221628 Hyatt, provisional designation 2006 YE_{13}, is a background asteroid on an inclined, comet-like orbit in the outer regions of the asteroid belt, approximately 7 kilometers (4 miles) in diameter. It was discovered on 26 December 2006, by Alex Gibbs, an American software engineer with the Catalina Sky Survey, who named it after his father and renowned physicist Hyatt M. Gibbs.

== Orbit and classification ==
Hyatt is a non-family asteroid from the main belt's background population. It orbits the Sun in the outer asteroid belt at a distance of 2.4–3.9 AU once every 5 years and 6 months (2,025 days; semi-major axis of 3.13 AU). Its orbit has an eccentricity of 0.25 and a notable inclination of 32° with respect to the ecliptic. While still considered a main-belt asteroid, Hyatt blurs the distinction between asteroids and comets due to its relatively high inclination and a Tisserand's parameter of 2.929, which already enters the territory of Jupiter-family comets.

The body's observation arc begins with a precovery taken by LONEOS in December 2000, or six years prior to its official discovery observation at Catalina.

== Physical characteristics ==
Hyatt's spectral type is unknown. It has an absolute magnitude of 14.4.

=== Diameter and albedo ===
Hyatt has not been observed by any of the space-based surveys such as the Infrared Astronomical Satellite IRAS, the Japanese Akari satellite, and NASA's Wide-field Infrared Survey Explorer with its subsequent NEOWISE mission. Based on a generic magnitude-to-diameter conversion, it measures approximately 7.4 kilometers in diameter for an absolute magnitude of 14.4, and an assumed albedo of 0.057. This is a typical value for carbonaceous C-type asteroids, which are the dominant type in the outer asteroid belt.

=== Rotation period ===
As of 2018, no rotational lightcurve of Hyatt has been obtained from photometric observations. The body's rotation period, pole and shape remain unknown.

== Naming ==
This minor planet was named by the discoverer after his father, Hyatt M. Gibbs (1938–2012), who was a physicist and professor at the University of Arizona College of Optical Sciences. Gibbs is known for his research on quantum optics and received several awards. The official naming citation was published by the Minor Planet Center on 3 July 2012 (M.P.C. 79912), just two months before he died on 3 September 2012.
