= Paeon (mythology) =

Multiple Greek mythological figures

In Greek mythology, Paean (Ancient Greek: Παιάν), Paeëon or Paieon (Ancient Greek: Παιήων), or Paeon or Paion (Ancient Greek: Παιών) may refer to the following characters:

- Paean (god), the physician of the Greek gods.
- Paeon (father of Agastrophus), the father of Agastrophus in Homer's Iliad, and the husband of Cleomede and father of Laophoon in Quintus Smyrnaeus' Posthomerica.
- Paeon (son of Antilochus), a lord of Messenia, from whom the Attic clan and deme of Paeonidae or Paionidai is supposed to have derived its name.
- Paeon (son of Endymion), from whom the district of Paionia was believed to have derived its name.
- Paeon (son of Poseidon), the son of Helle and Poseidon; in some legends he was called Edonus.
- Paeon, son of Ares and father of Biston.
- Paean, an epithet for the Greek god Apollo.
- Paean, an epithet for the Greek healer-god Asclepius.
