= Paean (disambiguation) =

A paean is a song or expression of thanksgiving, triumph, healing or praise.

Paean, Paeeon, Paeëon, Paeon, Paian, Paieon, or Paion (from the Ancient Greek Παιάν, Παιήων, or Παιών) may refer to:

== People ==
- Paeon of Amathus, an early Hellenistic historian from Amathus on the island of Cyprus
- Paeon (mythology), several figures from Greek mythology, including:
  - Paean (god), the physician of the Greek gods
  - Paeon (father of Agastrophus), the father of Agastrophus in Homer's Iliad, and the husband of Cleomede and father of Laophoon in Quintus Smyrnaeus' Posthomerica
  - Paeon (son of Antilochus), a lord of Messenia, from whom the Attic clan and deme of Paeonidae or Paionidai is supposed to have derived its name
  - Paeon (son of Endymion), from whom the district of Paionia was believed to have derived its name
  - Paeon (son of Poseidon), the son of Helle and Poseidon

== Places ==
- Paia, Achaea, a municipal unit in Achaea, Greece
- Paion (Thrace), the ancient Greek city located in Thrace

== Other uses ==
- Paean (horse), a British-trained racehorse
- Paeon (prosody), a metrical foot containing four syllables, where one of the syllables is long and the other three are short
- Paeon diagyios, another name for the metrical foot cretic or amphimacer, containing three syllables: long, short, long
- "A Paean", the original name for "Lenore", a poem by Edgar Allan Poe
