= Pholus =

Pholus may refer to:

- 5145 Pholus, a minor planet in the Solar System
- Pholus (mythology), a centaur in Greek myth
