= Melanchaetes =

In Greek mythology, Melanchaetes (Ancient Greek: Μελαγχαίτης means ‘black-haired’) may refer to the following:

- Melanchaetes, one of the centaurs who tried to steal the wine of Pholus and was killed by Heracles.
- Melanchaetes, one of the female dogs of the hunter Actaeon. Like the rest of the pack, she also devoured her master when he was transformed into a stag by Artemis, goddess of the hunt.
