= Almops =

Ancient Greek mythological figure

Almops (Ancient Greek: Ἄλμωψ) was, in Greek mythology, a giant son of the god Poseidon and the half-nymph Helle. He was the brother of Paeon (called "Edonus" in some accounts).

It is from Almops that the now-obsolete name for the region of Almopia (and its inhabitants, the Almopes) in Macedonia, Greece, is believed to have derived.
