= Destiny 2 =

2017 video game by Bungie

- Original box art featuring the game's three character classes: Hunter (left), Titan (center), and Warlock (right)
- Developer: Bungie (Note: Additional work on PC version was provided by Vicarious Visions. High Moon Studios provided development support on downloadable content.)
- Publishers: Activision (2017–2018); Bungie (2019–present)
- Directors: Christopher Barrett; Luke Smith; Ryan Ellis; Joe Blackburn; Tyson Green
- Producer: Jamie Carlisi
- Designers: Del Chafe III; M.E. Chung; Tyson Green; Sage Merrill; Christopher Opdahl; James Tsai
- Artists: Shiek Wang; Michael Zak
- Writers: Jason Harris; Christine Thompson
- Composers: Michael Salvatori; Skye Lewin; C Paul Johnson
- Series: Destiny
- Platforms: PlayStation 4; Xbox One; Windows; Stadia; PlayStation 5; Xbox Series X/S
- Release: PlayStation 4, Xbox One; September 6, 2017; Windows; October 24, 2017; Stadia; November 19, 2019; PS5, Xbox Series X/S; December 8, 2020
- Genres: First-person shooter, MMOG
- Mode: Multiplayer

Destiny 2 (Note: Also known as Destiny 2: New Light after October 1, 2019 and in Korea as Destiny: Guardians) is a free-to-play online first-person shooter video game developed by Bungie. (Note: The game was published by Activision until December 31, 2018, when Bungie acquired the publishing rights to the franchise.) The sequel to 2014's Destiny and its subsequent expansions, it was originally released as a paid title in 2017 for PlayStation 4, Xbox One, and Windows before transitioning to a free-to-play live service game under the New Light title on October 1, 2019, followed by the game's release on Stadia the following month, and then PlayStation 5 and Xbox Series X/S platforms in December 2020.

Set in a "mythic science fiction" world, the game features a multiplayer "shared-world" environment with elements of role-playing games. Like the original, activities in Destiny 2 are divided among player versus environment (PvE) and player versus player (PvP) game types. In addition to normal story missions, PvE features three-player "strikes" and dungeons and six-player raids. A free roam patrol mode is also available for most destinations which feature public events as well as activities not available in the original. These activities have an emphasis on exploration of the destinations and interactions with non-player characters (NPCs); the original Destiny only featured NPCs in social spaces. PvP features objective-based modes, as well as traditional deathmatch game modes. Players assume the role of a Guardian, protectors of Earth's last safe city as they wield a power called Light to protect humanity from different alien races and combat the looming threat of the Darkness—later on, players also learn to wield the power of Darkness.

Upon release, Destiny 2 received generally favorable reviews from critics. Praise focused on its improvements, particularly with regards to its initial story, as well as its gameplay, visuals, exploration focus, multiplayer, and public occasions. Reviews were divided on the recategorization of the weapons, the Leviathan raid, and new modes. Destiny 2 was nominated for and won various awards, such as at The Game Awards 2017 and Game Critics Awards.

Like the original Destiny, the game featured expansion packs which furthered the story and added new content. Bungie supported the game with 10 expansion packs among smaller seasonal updates released between each expansion; the seasonal model began in Year Two. Year Three marked a transition to a free-to-play model, where only the expansions and seasonal content required purchasing to access their narratives and activities. Year Four had the biggest impact on the game, as it introduced the Destiny Content Vault (DCV), wherein older content was removed periodically from the game and placed in the DCV (which included content from the original Destiny), possibly to be re-worked and re-added at a later time. Upon this initial introduction of the DCV, the game's original "Red War" campaign and raid, as well as the first two expansions, Curse of Osiris and Warmind, were removed, with the Forsaken expansion's campaign later removed as well. The franchise concluded its first major narrative arc, called the "Light and Darkness" saga, with Destiny 2's eighth expansion, The Final Shape, in June 2024.

Year Eight had originally begun a new saga called the "Fate" saga as Destiny 2 was intended to continue past the Renegades expansion, which was released in December 2025 as the game's 10th expansion, but due to a financial loss for parent company Sony, Bungie refocused their efforts into their other titles and cancelled the two expansions intended for Year Nine. At the time, the June 2026 major update, Monument of Triumph, was announced as the final content update for Destiny 2, and although Bungie had ended active development, the game remains online and playable, much like the original. Alongside the final update, all available expansions, content packs, and dungeon keys were packaged into Destiny 2: The Collection. In September 2026, Bungie announced their plans to return to the game and re-add all previously removed content to lay the foundation for new Destiny stories and games.

== Gameplay ==
Destiny 2 allows players, known in the game as Guardians, to utilize weaponry and special powers alongside other Guardians. Here a Guardian defends against enemies while another Guardian uses their powers to cast a shield made of Void energy.

Similar to its predecessor, Destiny 2 is a first-person shooter game that incorporates role-playing and massively multiplayer online game (MMO) elements. The original Destiny includes on-the-fly matchmaking that allowed players to communicate only with other players with whom they were "matched" by the game. To communicate with other players in the game world, players had to use their respective console's messaging system, until an in-game text chat was added later on. Destiny 2 featured a more optimal way of matchmaking called "Guided Games", until Season of the Wish, which allowed for players to search for clans or for clans to search for individuals when they needed additional players for raids. This matchmaking feature was replaced by an in-game "looking for group (LFG)" finder called "Fireteam Finder" which allowed for individuals and groups to search for teammates for any activity they wished to play. Like the original, activities in Destiny 2 are divided among player versus environment (PvE) and player versus player (PvP) game types.

=== Character progression and classes ===
As in the original game, players are able to improve their characters, referred to as Guardians, by gaining experience points (EXP) — when a set number of experience points are accumulated, the player's character will level up and gain improved statistics which further enhance performance in battle. As of the Shadowkeep expansion, this leveling system has since been replaced with the "season pass" system where players use EXP to "rank up", which rewards different items each rank (while there is no max rank on a season pass, seasonal rewards end at level 100). Quests, including the "main scenario" quests, are specific tasks given to the player by non-player characters (NPCs) which reward items and EXP. Completing main scenario quest lines progresses the overarching plot of the game.

Destiny 2 features the same three-character classes as the original Destiny. Each class has its own specific upgrades, perks, special abilities, and three sub-classes that allow players to finely tune their individual characters to provide a different play style. The three classes are Warlock, Hunter, and Titan. After choosing a class, players select one of three species for their character: Human, Awoken (bluish-gray-skinned descendants of Humans), or Exo (humanoid machines). They can then customize their characters, such as changing their gender or skin color. A character's species is cosmetic and does not affect gameplay. Players can create two more characters to have a character of each class.

- Hunters continue to have access to the Solar-based "Gunslinger" sub-class from the original game and the Void-based "Nightstalker" sub-class from the original's The Taken King expansion, both with gameplay changes. The Hunter's new sub-class for Destiny 2 is the Arc-based "Arcstrider", replacing the "Bladedancer" sub-class of the original. Arcstrider's super, "Arc Staff", focuses on an electrified staff and a large amount of rapid mobility. Forsaken added three new supers for each of the Hunter sub-classes: "Blade Barrage" for Gunslingers, focusing on throwing a volley of flaming knives; "Spectral Blades" for Nightstalkers, allowing players to see through walls and attack with Void daggers; and "Whirlwind Guard" for Arcstriders, which allows players to block and reflect projectiles by spinning their Arc Staff.
- Warlocks continue to have access to the Void-based "Voidwalker" sub-class from the original game and the Arc-based "Stormcaller" sub-class from the original's The Taken King expansion, both with several changes. The Warlock's new sub-class for Destiny 2 is the Solar-based "Dawnblade" with a super called "Daybreak", replacing the "Sunsinger" sub-class of the original. The Daybreak super allows the player to make Solar Light blades to strike enemies from mid-air. Forsaken gives Warlocks three new supers: "Nova Warp" for Voidwalkers, allowing players to warp around the battlefield and unleash a Void explosion; "Chaos Reach" for Stormcallers, which unleashes a beam of Arc energy which can be turned off at any time to conserve Super energy but limits mobility; and "Well of Radiance" for Dawnblades, allowing players to create a healing and empowering aura for players to stand in. However, as of Lightfall, it no longer provides an overshield to the players standing inside it.
- Titans continue to have access to the Arc-based "Striker" sub-class from the original game and the Solar-based "Sunbreaker" from the original's The Taken King expansion, both with significant gameplay changes. The Titan's new sub-class for Destiny 2 is the Void-based "Sentinel", replacing the "Defender" sub-class of the original, although the Sentinel sub-class can create the Defender's Ward of Dawn shielding bubble if this option is selected. Sentinel's super, "Sentinel Shield", allows the player to summon a shield that can block enemy fire and be used offensively (similar to Captain America's shield). Forsaken added three new supers for Titans: "Thundercrash" for Strikers, allowing players to launch into the air and slam onto the ground; "Burning Maul" for Sunbreakers, which players wield a large hammer than can unleash flaming tornadoes; and "Banner Shield" for Sentinels, which unleashes a protective barrier that allows other players to shoot through and empowers their damage.

Among other changes Beyond Light introduced a fourth sub-class for each of the three main classes, called Stasis, a power from the Darkness in contrast to Solar, Arc and Void which are powers granted by the Light of the Traveler, and generally based on slowing or freezing enemies. The Stasis sub-class does not have separate trees like these Light subclasses but is instead modular: while the fundamental Super ability for each class is fixed, the basic grenade, melee, and protection abilities can be customized, and additional effects, known as Aspects, can be added to these to further tailor the way the ability plays out for the player. Bungie has stated that additional Darkness powers, with the same type of modularity, are planned for future expansions, and that the Light subclasses will be reworked. The Void subclasses were updated in The Witch Queen expansion to support this modularity, with Solar and Arc reforms introduced in later The Witch Queen seasons. A new Darkness power, Strand, that draws on a psychic power to lash out at enemies with web-like lashes, or move quickly through a grappling hook-type power, was introduced in Lightfall.

As the player completes activities like strikes, raids, and dungeons, they earn experience towards the growth of their character, represented as their "Power" level (formerly their "Light" level). At the time of Destiny 2's initial release, this was tracked through an experience leveling system (EXP) that increased their Power level. Since around Shadowkeep, the experience level system has been dropped in favor of a Power level that represents the average Power level of each piece of gear carried by the character, with new and better equipment capable of increasing the overall Power level. A higher character level allows for better equipment with higher Power levels to be equipped. A higher Power level improves damage output and defense. A soft and hard Power level exists for gear which is incremented with each additional expansion or season; players can earn gear up to the soft Power level through most regular activities, but must participate in more challenging events, like Nightfall strikes, dungeons, or raids, to earn pinnacle gear to reach the hard Power level. Gear can be infused with unwanted gear of higher Power level to increase its Power level for the cost of in-game resources.

=== Gear ===
Weapons and armor were reorganized in Destiny 2. In the original game, weapons were divided as Primary, Special, and Heavy weapons. At launch, the weapons were categorized as Kinetic, Energy, and Power weapons. Primary weapons and some Special weapons in the original – such as hand cannons and sidearms – are classified as Kinetic and Energy weapons. Those without an elemental damage type go in the Kinetic weapons slot while those with a Light-based elemental damage type (Arc, Solar, or Void) go in the Energy weapons slot. Darkness-based damage types (Stasis and Strand) are placed as Kinetic weapons as to avoid crowding of Energy weapon types and give players more options for gear to complete challenging end game content. Power weapons include the Heavy weapons and the more powerful Special weapons from the first game, such as shotguns and sniper rifles, as well as new weapon types, such as the grenade launcher. As of Forsaken, the weapons system was overhauled, with many Power weapons, such as most shotguns, single-shot grenade launchers, and most sniper rifles, being reorganized into Kinetic and Energy weapons slots. With armor, the name of the stats has been changed. Instead of Strength, Intellect, and Discipline, there are stats for Resilience, Recovery, and Mobility. For armor, the helmet, gauntlets, chest, legs, and class item slots have remained unchanged, but the artifacts slot has been replaced with one for a player's clan banners. In "Beyond Light" Stasis Weapons were also introduced, being used in the Kinetic and Heavy Slot. Lightfall introduced Strand weapons in kinetic and heavy slots as well.

As launched, both weapons and armor were generated with random perks and other attributes from a base set of stats. Special consumable mods could be earned through gameplay or vendors that could be slotted into in weapon or armor piece to improve its attribute. With the Forsaken expansion, the mod system was revamped. While gear still accepted mods, these were now items that needed to be acquired only once to add to a player's collection from the game's world, either from vendors or as an activity reward, with some mods being only available on more challenging activities. Mods now could be added and swapped out on gear from one's collection the cost in glimmer, as a way to help players customize gear better according to Bungie.

The Shadowkeep expansion brought two major changes affecting gear. First was the introduction of the "Armor 2.0" system; rather that random perks, armor is generated with randomized attributes in six major areas related to each class and to each class skill, along with an assigned element and an energy level. The total attribute score from all pieces of equipment armor influences factors such as class ability cooldown rate, the rate of their super ability, or the cooldown of grenades and melee abilities. Players can infuse resources into an armor piece to increase the armor's energy level. A new array of mods for armor was introduced, most which are limited by element type and require a certain amount of energy. Players can thus add mods into armor that matched the element type, limited by the current energy level for the armor. Each piece of armor is limited to one general mod, two mods specific to that armor type (like helmet or gloves) and a mod related to the seasonal events. Seasonal event mods can be gained through the game world and can also be granted by the re-introduction of season-long artifacts, also with Shadowkeep, which a player gains near the beginning of each season and levels up as they gain experience. As they level up the artifact, they select which mods to unlock which include both special weapon mods and these unique season mods, typically tied to the season's story. The weapon mods included the introduction of special Champions, powerful enemies that required a weapon with the corresponding mod to initially weaken before damage can be done to it. They can also be stunned by particular subclass abilities as of lightfall.

As part of its preparation for Beyond Light, Bungie introduced additional revisions to the gear system in the final Season of Arrivals within the Shadowkeep expansion. First, each piece of gear, beyond exotics, would now have a maximum infusion Power level, generally representing the power level four seasons beyond the season that the piece of gear was introduced in as a means to "sunset" these gear items. Sunsetting has since been revised. Any gear that has been sunset will continue to be as such, but anything not sunset will continue to be not sunset. Second, players could now change the element of an armor for similar costs of infusion, and the fourth mod slot in armor gear, which had been restricted to mods from the same season the armor was associated with, was made universal, and now open to allow any mod from the armor's season or the two following it to be used in that slot. This was intended to give players more flexibility in customizing their armor's capabilities.

The Witch Queen brought a new weapon type, glaives, which feature a mix of melee and ranged combat abilities. This expansion also introduced weapon crafting, allowing the player to learn patterns for new weapons, build them from materials, and level them to allow them to recraft them for more powerful perks. Addition changes in The Witch Queen include a new additional origin perk for weapons tied to certain activities or event, artifice armor that can be obtained from more difficult encounters which adds in additional seasonal mod slot, and craftable weapons once the player has collected enough versions of a weapon with deepsight resonance.

=== Player versus environment (PvE) ===
Like the original game, player versus environment game types makes up the majority of the game. Areas to explore include Earth's European Dead Zone (which was only represented by PvP maps in the original), Saturn's moon Titan, Jupiter's moon Io, and the centaur planet Nessus. The Curse of Osiris expansion adds Mercury as an explorable area, while the Warmind expansion adds Mars. Forsaken adds two new explorable areas in the Reef: the Tangled Shore and the Dreaming City, the latter being the mysterious sanctuary of the Awoken race and an end-game area that is accessible after completing the campaign of Forsaken. Shadowkeep reintroduced the Moon location from the original game, though revamped and reprised from its original iteration. There is also a new social space in the European Dead Zone called "The Farm", as the main portion of the Tower of the original was destroyed at the start of Destiny 2's campaign. However, a lower, undamaged portion of the Tower becomes the main social space post-campaign. Like the original, there are Patrol missions and public events, but the emphasis has been placed more on the exploration of the worlds, including towns that players can visit and friendly NPCs who can be found in-game and will give side-quests. New missions were added called "Adventures", which allow players to explore the area and go on a treasure hunt-like journey to dungeon-like areas. Some Adventures culminate in what is called a Lost Sector, which are somewhat hidden areas in worlds that lead players to a boss that yields rewards upon its defeat. Lost Sectors can be found and accessed without doing an Adventure. Starting with the Curse of Osiris expansion, Heroic Adventures were added, which are harder versions of Adventures and they rotate each week.

A map has also been added to the game, which shows the locations of the NPCs, Adventures, Heroic Adventures, Region Chests, and Lost Sectors. The maps of these new areas are much larger than those in the original Destiny, with one being described as twice as large as any area of the original. Players no longer have to leave a planet and go to orbit to travel to another location; they can now do so immediately from their current in-game location. Another new activity has been added called Flashpoints, which is a weekly milestone that takes place on one of the eight locations and rotates each week. Players complete public events, loot Lost Sectors and complete Heroic Adventures to earn high-level rewards. Similar to the original game, players can pledge their allegiance to one of three factions — Dead Orbit, Future War Cult, or New Monarchy. In Destiny 2, however, the factions now compete against each other in the Faction Rally, which is a periodic event that lasts for one week. Faction points are earned by doing various activities. The faction with the most points at the end of the week earns a high-level reward for 1,000 Glimmer (in-game currency). The losing factions can also gain the reward, but must pay 50,000 Glimmer for their faction's item.

Once a player has completed the main story and has reached the level cap (currently any level one wants as of the seasons), they unlock access to different types of end-game content. These activities include Nightfall strikes (a weekly featured strike with modifiers and high-level rewards; as of the Forsaken expansion, players can choose one of three featured strikes), a strike playlist with modifiers, a Daily Heroic Story playlist, the "Leviathan" and "Last Wish" raids, the "Eater of Worlds" and "Spire of Stars" raid lairs, and the "Escalation Protocol" and "Blind Well" horde activities on Mars and the Dreaming City, respectively, among other PvP activities. A harder difficulty mode called "Prestige" is available for the Leviathan raid and its raid lairs, with modifiers; there are no plans for a Prestige mode for Last Wish. These end-game activities reward players with powerful gear upon successful completion to increase their Power level.

=== Player versus player (PvP) ===
Like the original, player versus player combat exists in what is called the Crucible with Lord Shaxx returning as its NPC "Handler". The original Destiny's Crucible featured six-versus-six and three-versus-three game modes, as well as a limited time two-versus-two mode. At launch, all game modes were four-versus-four as Bungie shifted their focus to smaller teams for competitive multiplayer and better map design, but Quickplay modes eventually became six-versus-six. Like the original, player statistics such as weapon power and defense are balanced between players in Crucible game modes. The in-game HUD was updated so that players can see if an enemy has their super charged, and/or if they are carrying power ammo. Currently, players have the option to choose between four rotating playlists, rumble (a six-player Free-for-All game mode) survival and freelance survival (A version of survival where players cannot choose the teammates on their team), classic mix, and private matches.

Trials of Osiris from the original game was replaced by Trials of the Nine. Like Trials of Osiris, Trials of the Nine begins on Fridays and ends with the weekly reset on Tuesdays. The game mode for this new Trials, however, has changed; instead of using the Elimination mode of the original, Trials of the Nine rotates each week between Destiny 2's two new game modes, Countdown and Survival. Only one map is featured for Trials' four-day duration, but the map also rotates weekly. Unlike Trials of Osiris, players can gain access to the Trials of the Nine's social space called The Spire, located in unknown space, for completing a match of Trials and earning Trials tokens. There, players will meet an NPC called the Emissary of the Nine, who will exchange tokens for gear. Gaining three, five, and seven wins on the scorecard, respectively, gain access to the upper tiers of the social space with greater rewards at each tier. Going flawless with seven wins allows admittance into an exclusive area with even greater rewards. Three losses reset the scorecard. To access Trials of the Nine, players must have completed the campaign, completed Lord Shaxx's "Call to Arms" milestone, and have a Power level of at least 260.

The periodic competitive Iron Banner PvP mode of the original game, which disabled balancing of player's gear, also returned for the sequel. Destiny 2's Iron Banner, however, does not disable balancing, with Bungie stating that "Your fighting abilities, not your power levels, will decide the outcome". This was changed following the release of Forsaken, with balancing becoming disabled like the original game. Like the original, Iron Banner lasts for one week and features milestones to complete daily. Players must have completed the campaign and be level 20 to access Iron Banner, which features the returning Lord Saladin from the original game as its NPC.

In Destiny 2's second year, a new PvP activity with PVE elements was released called Gambit. This activity puts two teams of four against each other to defeat AI opponents from one of the game's different factions/races (Cabal, Fallen, Hive, Lucent Hive, Vex, or new with Forsaken, Scorn), collect their motes and then bank them. A maximum of 15 motes can be held time, and every increment five motes banked will spawn a different sized blocker on each side. Five motes will spawn Taken Vex Goblin as a small blocker, 10 will spawn a Taken Fallen Captain, and 15 motes will spawn a Taken Hive Ogre. At different points in the game an invasion portal will spawn where a member of the team can invade the other team to defeat other players who are carrying motes. When a team banks a total of 75 motes, the boss will appear; whichever team defeats the boss first wins that round. There are three rounds, best of three wins. During Season of the Drifter, a new version of Gambit was added called 'Gambit Prime'. The concept remained the same, but the number of motes required to spawn the boss was increased to 100. When multiple blockers are present, the team bank will start draining and adding to the other team's total mote count, and the level advantage is enabled. It was later merged into a single activity, using a variant of the Gambit Prime version, with the release of the Season of the Hunt update.

== Plot ==
=== The Red War (2017) ===
One year after the SIVA Crisis, Cabal forces of the Red Legion launch an aerial assault on the Last City, destroying the main portion of the Tower, the headquarters of the Guardians. The player's Guardian and their Ghost respond by assisting the Vanguard in assaulting the Red Legion command ship. As they confront the Red Legion's commander, Dominus Ghaul, his forces attach a device to the Traveler and begin draining it of the Light, the power used by the Guardians. The Guardian loses their powers and is nearly killed by Ghaul. Waking up two days after the attack, the Guardian locates their Ghost, who can still heal the Guardian but can no longer resurrect them. They find a haven known as "the Farm" in the European Dead Zone (EDZ) with the assistance of Suraya Hawthorne, a non-Guardian human from the outskirts of the Last City.

The Guardian follows a vision to encounter a shard of the Traveler hidden in a forest within the EDZ. Ghost interfaces with the shard and both it and the Guardian's connection to the Light are restored. After restoring long-range communications, Hawthorne intercepts a distress call from Commander Zavala, urging surviving Guardians to travel to Saturn's moon Titan to assist in preparing to mount a counter-offensive. Against Hawthorne's objections, the Guardian travels to Titan, which has been overrun by the Hive. With assistance from Deputy Commander Sloane, they learn that the Red Legion was dispatched to the Milky Way in response to a distress call sent during the Taken War two years prior, and that Ghaul possesses a superweapon known as the Almighty, a space station capable of destroying stars. Resistance to Cabal rule has resulted in entire star systems being destroyed. The intelligence also reveals that the Almighty is positioned near the Sun, breaking up the planet Mercury as fuel. Zavala tasks the Guardian to find Ikora Rey and Cayde-6 to assist in a counterattack to retake the Last City. During this time, it is shown that Ghaul, aided by his mentor, the Consul, overthrew and exiled Emperor Calus and took control of the Cabal, and has been studying the Traveler in order to learn how to utilise the Light.

The Guardian locates Cayde-6 on the centaur Nessus, which has almost been completely transformed by the Vex. With the aid of Failsafe, an AI from the crashed colony ship Exodus Black, the Guardian frees Cayde from a Vex portal loop and claims a teleporter for use in taking back the city. Cayde directs the Guardian to find Ikora on the Jovian moon of Io (which the Traveler had partially terraformed until the Darkness arrived), where she had gone to find answers about the Traveler. Ikora and Io researcher Asher Mir direct the Guardian to locate a Warmind, an ancient defensive AI, for intelligence on the Almighty. This intelligence reveals that simply destroying the Almighty will take the sun down with it. Afterwards, the Vanguard reunites at the Farm and conclude that the only way to retake the Last City and save the Traveler is to shut down the Almighty first, eliminating the possibility of it destroying the Sun. The Guardian boards the Almighty using a stolen Cabal ship and disables the weapon, signaling Zavala to begin the counterattack. As the Vanguard begins the assault, the Consul admonishes Ghaul for his obsession with the Traveler, and urges him to simply take the Light by force, rather than trying to earn it; Ghaul is reluctant until the Consul kills the Speaker, whom Ghaul had captured and tortured to try and learn more about the Traveler. Ghaul then proclaims that he will take the Light, and strangles the Consul in a fit of rage.

The Guardian returns to Earth to assist in the counterattack and infiltrates Ghaul's command ship, using Cayde's Vex teleporter, alone to save the Traveler. Ghaul forcibly takes the Light and uses its power against the Guardian, but the Guardian is successful in defeating Ghaul. Ghaul reemerges as a massive ethereal figure who then speaks to the Traveler directly. In response, the Traveler wakes from its apparent long sleep, destroying the device that was harvesting its power and killing Ghaul. It sends a massive shockwave throughout Sol, restoring the Light to all Guardians and decimating the Red Legion's forces. The game ends with a posthumous voiceover from the Speaker, reminding all that the Light can never be stopped. The Guardian and Ghost convene with Zavala, Ikora, Cayde, and Hawthorne at an undamaged portion of the Tower, with the Vanguard returning to their old duties and Hawthorne assuming a new post there. In a post-credits scene, the shockwave sent by the Traveler is shown coursing through the entire system. The wave of Light then extends beyond the solar system and spreads beyond the Milky Way, before panning across a fleet of dark, mysterious Pyramid-shaped ships sitting some distance away in extragalactic space. The ships activate and begin moving toward Earth.

Following Ghaul's defeat, a massive Cabal ship called the Leviathan appears in orbit of Nessus (which it slowly begins to consume), under the control of the exiled Emperor Calus. The emperor's invites Guardians to complete a series of challenges before reaching his throne ("Leviathan" raid). A fireteam of Guardians complete his challenges before facing Calus himself; however, after overcoming his strange powers and defeating him, they discover that they were fighting a mechanical doppelganger. The real Calus speaks through the machine, claiming that what they know is a lie and that there is a truth beyond what the Speaker had told them.

The events of Destiny 2: Curse of Osiris follow.

=== New Light ===
==== 2019 ====
With the release of the free-to-play New Light version of Destiny 2 in October 2019, Bungie changed the beginning of the game for new players, reintroducing the first mission from the original Destiny as the introductory mission for new players. Upon completing this brief mission, which ended with the player finding a jumpship, the player was taken to the Tower, where they met the various NPCs and could begin the Destiny 2 campaign (The Red War), as well as the Curse of Osiris and Warmind campaigns, after talking to Amanda Holliday in the Tower Hangar. Returning players could play this opening mission by creating a new character.

==== 2020 update ====
With the release of the Beyond Light expansion in November 2020, Destiny 2's original base campaign (The Red War), as well as all of the content from Curse of Osiris and Warmind were removed from the game and placed into the Destiny Content Vault and are no longer accessible (though Bungie unvaulted some associated destinations and activities later). In game, part of the content removal is explained through planets being taken over and removed from normal space by the forces of Darkness. As a result, Bungie introduced a new player experience to introduce new players to the world of Destiny. It features roughly the same opening as the 2019 New Light, but takes players on a quest further into the Cosmodrome to learn more about the Destiny universe, giving new players' Guardians a more fleshed out origin story. A new NPC for the Cosmodrome was also introduced, who acts as a guide for the new player quest. Veteran players can play through this new player questline by visiting the abandoned quest kiosk that was added to the Tower social space with the update.

Like the original Destiny, an opening cinematic is shown where a landing pod lands on Mars' surface in present day. Three astronauts leave the pod to explore the surface of Mars and find an enormous spherical object hovering in the sky. A narration begins, giving a brief history of the Traveler, the Darkness, and the Golden Age of humanity and the first Collapse caused by the Darkness. The game then begins as Ghost is searching among the detritus of Old Russia in the Cosmodrome until it finds and resurrects the player's Guardian, who had died in an undefined moment of the past—upon resurrection, Guardians have no memories of their past life from before becoming a Guardian. Ghost then guides the Guardian, battling Fallen enemies along the way, until they encounter a Vanguard Operative, a Hunter named Shaw Han, who is in search of his fireteam members, Cas and Maeve. Han initially tells the Guardian to stay behind and he would get them to the Last City after he finds his fireteam, but the Guardian and Ghost convince Han to allow them to assist him on his mission. Han has the Guardian go in search of Maeve while he searches for Cas. However, the Guardian is too late, as Maeve was killed by a Hive Wizard called Navôta, Eir Spawn, who also destroyed Maeve's Ghost, preventing Maeve from being resurrected; Han reports that he was also too late in saving Cas. They then meet up back at Han's camp, where Han says to honor his fireteam's loss, they should finish their mission; Han and his fireteam were in search of a Golden Age relic called a superconductor which the Vanguard believe can be used to create a powerful weapon, however, the superconductor is sealed within a chamber and is overloading the building with deadly Arc energy.

The Guardian then goes and collects data from defeated Fallen to figure out a plan to get past the Arc energy. From the data, they learn the location of an ancient array that they need to get operational to balance the power grid to keep the Arc energy from overloading. After successfully raising the array, Han has the Guardian meet him back at camp so they can regroup and then go collect the superconductor. Upon arriving at the camp, however, the Guardian and Ghost find an audio message that Han went on the mission alone, taking the only access key to the superconductor's chamber, and left the Guardian a Sparrow so they could make their way to the Last City. Guardian and Ghost find this unacceptable and Ghost ponders that there has to be another access key and scans Han's archived data, leading them to the Cosmodrome's Forgotten Shore. After searching through some old caches and boosting Ghost's signal, Ghost is able to piece together encrypted data to create a new key. They then head towards the chamber where they encounter Navôta and her swarm of Hive. The Guardian fights off the Hive, forcing Navôta to retreat and they save Han, who apologizes for leaving them behind, stating that he was afraid to lose another Guardian. They then retrieve the superconductor and meet back at Han's camp. With the mission to retrieve the superconductor complete, Han says that Commander Zavala, the leader of the Vanguard, has ordered him to keep post in the Cosmodrome. Han then gives the Guardian Maeve's jumpship, and they use it to fly to the Tower to meet Zavala and deliver the superconductor.

In flight to the Tower, Ghost explains that he revived the Guardian to help protect humanity and reclaim lost worlds. After arriving in the Tower, Ghost tells the Guardian that the spherical object in the sky is the Traveler, which is where Ghost and their Light—their power—comes from. The Guardian then delivers the superconductor to Vanguard Commander Zavala, who praises them for their work as a new Guardian and instructs them to meet the rest of the Vanguard and other allies. After meeting the Warlock Vanguard Ikora Rey, Ghost explains that there was no Hunter Vanguard as after the death of the former one, Cayde-6, no Hunter wanted to take his place (he would later be succeeded by Crow after the events of The Final Shape). They then meet a few other important core activity characters, such as the Drifter and Lord Shaxx, before returning to Zavala, who gives the Guardian their first official assignment; Han has tracked down Navôta and Zavala wants the Guardian in on the mission to take her out. The Guardian returns to the Cosmodrome to hunt down Navôta one last time, where they eliminate the Hive Wizard. With that success, the Guardian returns to Zavala, who congratulates them and informs them that after analyzing the superconductor, they can create the exotic submachine gun Riskrunner. Thus, the Guardian has begun their journey to become legend.

With the 2020 update, the events of Destiny 2: Shadowkeep follow the New Light questline.

=== Light and Darkness Saga continued (2019–2025) ===
The first six years of Destiny 2 continue the Light and Darkness Saga from the first Destiny game in 2014.

While Destiny 2's expansions continued to expand the story, Bungie began a larger narrative epic with its seasonal content starting in Shadowkeep. During Shadowkeep, Eris Morn discovers a Pyramid ship buried beneath the Moon's surface. The Guardian encounters a Voice from the Darkness, warning them of the fleet's imminent arrival within the system. The Vanguard deal with new threats from Hive and Vex forces loyal to the Darkness as the Pyramid fleet arrives, taking positions above Io, Titan, Mercury, and Mars. The Darkness attempts to communicate with Eris, but is blocked by Savathûn. The Guardians defeat Savathûn's forces, giving the Darkness the opportunity to alert them to a new power awaiting them on Europa. Meanwhile, the Vanguard evacuate their forces from those planets occupied by the Darkness before they are abducted by a strange force. Deputy Commander Sloane, Asher Mir, and Brother Vance elect to stay behind on the planets as they vanish. As the planets began to disappear from space, the Traveler started gathering Light, exhibiting unfamiliar behavior. A Vanguard command is given out to all Guardians across the Solar System to return to the Last City, and they witness the Traveler repairing its broken shell in a burst of Light.

In Beyond Light, the Vanguard find signs of the Darkness pyramids across the system. On Europa, the Guardians accept the power of Stasis from the Darkness to defeat a new Fallen House that also learned to use Stasis. Zavala and other members of the Vanguard are concerned about the use of the powers of Darkness. However, they recognize its effectiveness against the oppositional forces of humanity. The Vanguard make alliances with the Cabal and one of the Fallen Houses, as they recognize they face common threats. It is revealed that Savathûn is impersonating Osiris, the former Warlock Vanguard, possibly to manipulate the current Vanguard. She is willingly held in a crystal encasement by Mara Sov, having made a deal to return the real Osiris if Mara agrees to exorcise her worm. After the Guardians rescue Techeuns lost in the Ascendant Realm, Savathûn's worm is exorcised, and Mara Sov aims to kill her in her weakened state. However, Savathûn escapes in the aftermath, leaving behind a comatose Osiris, fulfilling the bargain.

The Witch Queen focuses on the Hive God Savathûn, who has obtained the power of the Light and gifted it to her soldiers (known as the Lucent Brood). Taking place in Savathûn's Throne World, Guardians fight off the Hive to take back the Light. As the story progresses, it is revealed that the Traveler itself resurrected Savathûn, who died post-exorcism, and granted her brood the Light. This causes confusion among the Vanguard on why the Traveler helped humanity's enemy. As the Guardians fight off the Lucent Brood, they find and meet Fynch, a Lucent Ghost that allies with them in defeating Savathûn. They also learn from objects associated with Savathûn's past that her homeworld Fundament was visited by the Traveler. However, before the Traveler could gift them with a Golden Age, an entity called the Witness tricked Sathona, Savathûn's pre-Hive name, into believing that an incoming cataclysm would strike Fundament, caused by the Traveler. Her and her siblings were tricked into dealing with the Worm Gods in order to prevent the calamity, creating the Hive and turning the Hive away from the Traveler. Savathûn, stunned and angered by this revelation, unleashed her anger at the Guardians while trying to steal the Traveler "for its protection". The Guardian kills Savathûn, though her Ghost Immaru escapes. Elsewhere, the Witness prepares for a final assault of the Pyramid fleet against the Traveler.

Lightfall features the return of Emperor Calus, now a Disciple of the Witness, and has established a new player destination on Neptune. The Guardian allies with the Neomuni, the inhabitants of Neptune's colony of Neomuna who are descendants from a lost Golden Age expedition, to fend off Calus's invasion of the city. Together with Osiris's help, the Guardians also learn to channel and utilise the new Darkness power of Strand. Before being defeated, Calus helps the Witness acquire access to an object called the Veil, allowing the Witness to pierce the Traveler's shell and enter it, to the shock of the Vanguard. In the subsequent seasons, the Vanguard sought ways to follow the Witness, eventually learning from a resurrected Savathûn that she has crafted a wish with Riven that will allow one person to enter the Traveler. Crow offers to go, as his connection with Mara Sov would let the Vanguard follow after he establishes a point of safety within.

The Final Shape sees events taking place in the Pale Heart, a space within the Traveler opened by the Witness, and includes the return of Cayde-6 (with Nathan Fillion reprising this role). The Guardian battles through the Pale Heart before finally reaching the Witness's monolith where a team of Guardians battle and defeat the Witness, ending the war between Light and Dark. In the aftermath of the Witness's defeat, remnants of the Witness called Echoes are sent out across the system, with three landing within the system. One comes under the command of Maya Sundarash, who becomes known as The Conductor, another comes under the command of Fikrul, a Fallen Barron that was defeated during the events of Forsaken, and the other lands upon the abandoned Dreadnaught in the rings of Saturn, reviving the spirit of the dead Taken King, Oryx. The Guardian puts a stop to these echoes, except the Conductor, who escapes into the Vex Network.

=== Fate Saga (2025–2026) ===
Following The Final Shape, Bungie moved into what was planned to be a long-term story called the Fate Saga, which began with the Year of Prophecy expansions. Instead of four seasons as in past expansions, Bungie offered two mid-sized expansions, along with a free seasonal content update within each expansion. The first expansion, The Edge of Fate, launched in July 2025, and features the Guardians traveling to the planet Kepler with the Sol system's Oort Cloud, which involves the Nine. The next expansion, Renegades, launched in December 2025, and themed around concepts from Star Wars, a significant influence on Destiny's design, and includes crossover Star Wars elements into Destiny. The Fate saga was cut short, however, as Bungie ended support for Destiny 2 following the release of the Monument of Triumph update in June 2026.

== Development ==
A sequel to Destiny was first mentioned in November 2014, two months after the original released, by Activision chief executive officer Eric Hirshberg, where he said "Work has also begun on future expansion packs as well as on our next full game release". Based on documents of the original release schedule for Destiny, Bungie and Activision intended to release new, disc-based sequels every other year until 2019, with large downloadable expansions in between. Originally planned for a September 2016 release (based on the original documents), Bungie confirmed on February 11, 2016, that a full sequel would release in 2017. That same month, video game writer Christopher Schlerf, who was the lead writer for Halo 4 and worked on Mass Effect: Andromeda, joined Bungie. In December 2016, Bungie announced that Vicarious Visions would be joining the development team along with Activision. Unlike the original, it was rumored that Destiny 2 would also release on Microsoft Windows, which was confirmed on March 30, 2017.

In Activision's earnings report for 2016, Hirshberg said that Destiny's sequel was still "on track for release this fall [2017]." Activision said the sequel would "broaden the franchise's global reach." Hirshberg elaborated that players who had spent hours in the original would "love" the sequel, and for those who had not played Destiny, or had not played in a while

... we think we've made a sequel that's going to have a lot for them to love, too. The cornerstone of that is a great cinematic story that's been a real focus with a great cast of memorable, relatable characters, coupled with some very nice ways to make the game more accessible to a casual player. Without losing anything that our core players love, we've made it more accessible to someone who just wants to have a great, more casual first-person action experience.

Bungie had said that players' characters and progression would carry over into future releases. However, this turned out to only be half true. Characters and progression did carry over into Destiny's expansions, but for the sequel, only players' characters' physical appearance carried over if they had reached level 20 and completed the Black Garden quest in the original. In regards to why progression and items did not carry over, Bungie said: "We believe this is the best path forward. It allows us to introduce the major advancements and improvements that all of us expect from a sequel, ensuring it will be the best game we can create, unencumbered by the past." Bungie awarded veteran players in Destiny 2 with in-game emblems that acknowledged their accomplishments in the original Destiny. Players' characters, progression, and items are still accessible in the original Destiny, which will continue to remain online.

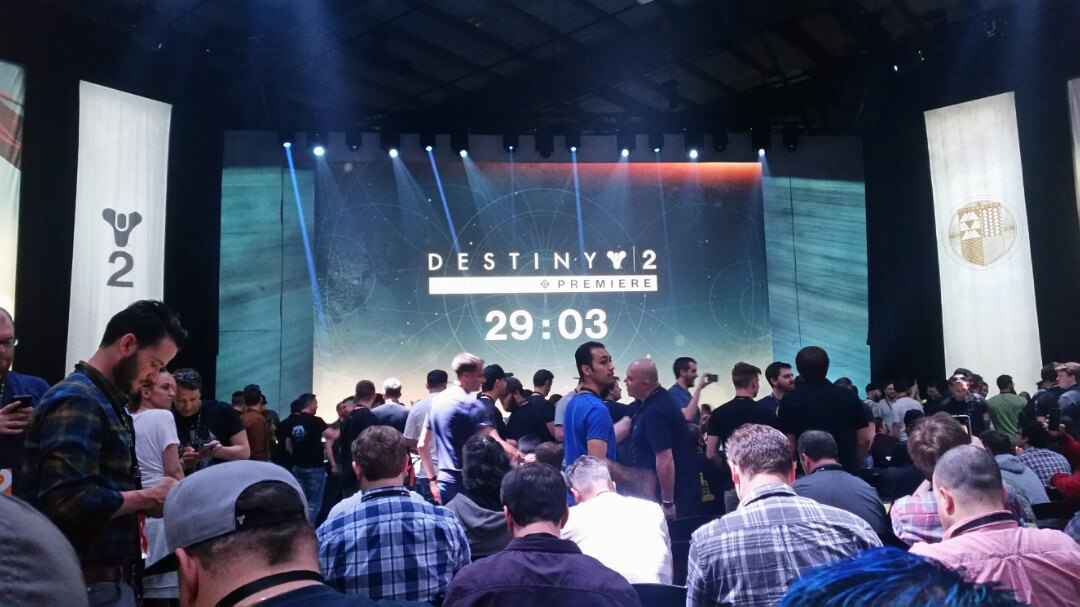
Destiny 2 presentation on May 18 at Jet Center in Hawthorne, California

On March 23, 2017, a promotional poster for the sequel was leaked by Lega Network, revealing the game's name as Destiny 2 and a release date of September 8, 2017, with the mention of a public beta for the game. The poster showed that just like the original, Destiny 2 would have PlayStation exclusive content. On March 27, 2017, although not directly responding to the leaked information, Bungie tweeted an image of Destiny 2. The image showed The Last City in smoke and flames with "Destiny" and a large "2" over the Traveler. This was followed up with a teaser trailer narrated by character Cayde-6. The teaser showed the Tower under attack by the Cabal, one of the enemy races from the original game. PlayStation's YouTube channel showed a slightly extended teaser, officially confirming that there would be timed exclusive content for PlayStation 4, and it would last until at least fall 2018. A full reveal trailer released on March 30, showing the three class Vanguards, Commander Zavala (Titan), Cayde-6 (Hunter), and Ikora Rey (Warlock), rallying Guardians in the war-torn Tower. The Cabal are being led by Ghaul, the commander of the Red Legion. The trailers confirmed that Lance Reddick, Nathan Fillion, and Gina Torres would be reprising their roles as the class Vanguards, respectively. Nolan North also confirmed that he would be reprising Ghost, the Guardian's AI companion. Bungie had a live stream of Destiny 2's gameplay on May 18. Other performers reprising their roles included Bill Nighy, Shohreh Aghdashloo, Peter Stormare, Lennie James, Claudia Black, and James Remar, alongside new voices Frank Langella, Joy Osmanski, and H. Jon Benjamin. Following Reddick's death in March 2023, his role of Commander Zavala was recast, with Keith David taking over performance as of August 2023.

On May 19, 2017, Destiny 2 project lead Mark Noseworthy told IGN that there were no plans for a Nintendo Switch version of the game. Noseworthy went on to say:

I think it's pretty unrealistic given we're an online-only game, right? The Switch, because it's a portable – and I love my Switch, I've got Breath of the Wild here, I've got it with me. It's incredible, I love the console, but in terms of where it's at, I don't want to leave anyone with the possibility of like, 'it's a thing we'll consider, maybe next year.' There's no plans right now for Switch.

The Microsoft Windows version of Destiny 2 supports native 4K resolution and uncapped frame rate (fps), full mouse and keyboard support, text chat, adjustable field of view, and 21:9 monitor support, and was exclusive to Blizzard Entertainment's Battle.net service at the time of its launch. Although not native 4K, Destiny 2 does support 4K enhancements for the PlayStation 4 Pro, an updated version of the standard PlayStation 4 that supports 4K rendering. Similarly, the Xbox One had an updated version called the Xbox One X that released in November 2017 after Destiny 2's launch. Bungie added 4K support for the One X, as well as HDR support for both updated consoles, on December 5, 2017. Unlike the Windows version, however, the console versions are locked at 30fps. Destiny 2 also has an improvement with its servers, which are a combination of dedicated servers and peer-to-peer networking. Lead engineer Matt Segur explained, "Every activity in Destiny 2 is hosted by one of our servers. ... That means [players] will never again suffer a host migration during [a] Raid attempt or Trials match. This differs from Destiny 1, where these hosting duties were performed by player consoles and only script and mission logic ran in the data center."

Grimoire cards that were found in the original game, which detailed the lore of the Destiny universe and could only be accessed from Bungie's website and the Destiny app, did not return for the sequel. For Destiny 2, Bungie shifted their focus to in-game storytelling, which was something the original was criticized for lacking. To detail the lore of the universe in Destiny 2, there are many artifacts around the maps that can be scanned by Ghost, who will give details and backstory. Exotic gear and some legendary gear also have a lore tab. At the 2017 Electronic Entertainment Expo (E3), a new cinematic trailer was shown, narrated by the main antagonist, Dominus Ghaul. It showed that Bungie did focus more on the story for the sequel than the original, as Bungie was "attempting to go in-depth into the universe and the motivations of the characters." E3 2017 also revealed that Destiny 2's release date was moved up to September 6, 2017, and the Windows version was confirmed for an October 24 release. The dates for the beta on the console versions were also confirmed at E3 2017. Early access for pre-order customers began on PS4 on July 18 followed by Xbox One on July 19; non-pre-order customers received access beginning July 21. The console beta concluded on July 25, after a 2-day extension. The beta for the PC began on August 29 and concluded on August 31.

In the spring of 2025, following the announcement of a release date for the Marathon reboot, Bungie asserted that it would continue to support Destiny 2 indefinitely, but announced the end of content development a year later in 2026.

=== Soundtrack ===
The original score was composed by Michael Salvatori, Skye Lewin, C. Paul Johnson, Rotem Moav, and Peter Schlosser. Although not credited in the original soundtrack, Michael Sechrist also composed for Destiny 2 and would be a more prominent composer in future DLCs such as Witch Queen and Beyond Light.When creating the music, the composers stated their goal with it was to "capture the somber spirit of a civilization confronting immense tragedy", and also to "inspire bravery in the hearts of our heroes as they stand together and fight to reclaim all that they hold dear".

The score was received very positively with the original soundtrack on YouTube receiving thousands of supportive comments from fans. Comments described the soundtrack as both epic and nostalgic for long time fans.

In October 2023, composers Michael Salvatori and Michael Sechrist were laid off amid staff cutbacks across the company. Soon after in January 2024, Skye Lewin left Bungie as well. The news of these layoffs among many other veteran employees was received poorly by the Destiny 2 community with disappointment expressed on large platforms such as X and Reddit.

== Release ==
Destiny 2 was released worldwide for the PlayStation 4 and the Xbox One on September 6, 2017, and the Microsoft Windows version released worldwide on October 24. There were several editions of the game, including a Collector's Edition, a Limited Edition, a Digital Deluxe Edition, and the standard base game. Like the original, there was an Expansion Pass, which granted access to the first two expansions of Destiny 2. Also like the original Destiny, pre-orders for the game received early access to the game's beta, as well as other in-game pre-order bonuses, such as early access to the exotic weapon "Coldheart", the game's first trace rifle which shoots a continuous laser beam while the trigger is held. Pre-orders from GameStop received a Cayde-6 collectible figure. Other figures and toys, such as Lord Saladin, were released after Destiny 2's console launch. Per an exclusivity agreement with Sony Interactive Entertainment that began with the original Destiny, the PlayStation 4 version of Destiny 2 featured timed-exclusive content until late 2018; PS4 exclusive content ended with the release of the Shadowkeep expansion in October 2019.

The Collector's Edition of Destiny 2 included the base game in a SteelBook case, the Expansion Pass, a themed backpack, a "Frontier Kit", which featured a solar panel USB charger with built-in light, a paracord, and a solar blanket, a 15" laptop/tablet sleeve with protective pocket slip, a Cabal-themed collector's box with various items, and premium digital content. The Limited Edition, distributed exclusively from GameStop, included the same physical and digital items as the Collector's Edition, minus the backpack, "Frontier Kit", and laptop/tablet sleeve. The Digital Deluxe Edition included all of the premium digital content. There was also a limited-time PlayStation 4 bundle that included a glacier white PlayStation 4 Pro, Destiny 2, the Expansion Pass, and premium digital content.

The Windows version was initially distributed exclusively through Blizzard Battle.net, marking the first non-Blizzard Entertainment title to be distributed via the platform. In January 2019, Bungie and Activision amicably broke their publishing agreement, leaving Bungie as the game's publisher for the PC version. The Windows version of Destiny 2 remained on the Battle.net platform for the next several months, but transitioned to Steam upon release of the Shadowkeep expansion in October 2019. As part of Bungie's plans to expand Destiny 2 to new platforms after their acquisition by Sony, Destiny 2 was added to the Epic Games Store in August 2022.

With the release of the Shadowkeep expansion in October 2019, Bungie made several changes to the monetization model of Destiny 2. Bungie's aim was to have the game able to be played by anyone with their friends, regardless of platform, so they implemented cross-saving, allowing players to transfer their characters from one platform to another; this did not apply to paid content such as the expansions which would have to be rebought on the other platform. Alongside this, they partnered with Google to offer Destiny 2 on the Stadia game streaming service. Additionally, alongside the release of Shadowkeep, Bungie made Destiny 2 free to play in its "New Light" version, making the base game, the Leviathan raid, and many of the player-versus-player modes free, including the first two expansions, Curse of Osiris and Warmind. Forsaken and Shadowkeep were still required to be purchased à la carte by the player to access their respective content. Shadowkeep and future expansions were considered standalone experiences, not requiring the player to have bought the other additional content. Further, Destiny 2 introduced a battle pass system lasting for each season, featuring two tiers of rewards, which included weapons, cosmetics, and in-game materials and currency, for playing various activities during that season. One tier was free for all players, while the second tier was only available to players that had purchased the season pass, renamed as reward passes in 2025. Both New Light and the Shadowkeep expansion came after Bungie's acquisition of the publishing rights of the Destiny franchise from Activision.

Bungie announced in June 2020 that moving into the fourth year of content for the game, beginning with the Beyond Light expansion in November, that it would retire some of the less played existing content into a "Destiny Content Vault" (DCV), which included all of the content from the original game, making the worlds and activities associated with them unavailable to play, as the developers stated the game had become too large and unmanagable with all the content they were continuing to add (the size of the game client had reached approximately 115 GB). However, they periodically unvaulted some of these areas and activities, including updated versions of areas and activities from the original Destiny (seen first with the Moon in the Shadowkeep expansion), to give players opportunities to complete quests and triumphs associated with them over time. For example, the Leviathan area was brought back for "Season of the Haunted" with The Witch Queen, though with new activities and changes to the maps to reflect the story elements around it. Bungie said that using the DCV to rework content was an alternative to developing a wholly new Destiny 3 game. However, by August 2022, Bungie stated that they had improved the backend technology behind Destiny 2 and would no longer vault expansion content, but seasonal content would continue to be vaulted at the end of each content year.

They confirmed that Earth's Cosmodrome patrol location and strikes would return during seasons 12 and 13, and that the original game's Vault of Glass raid would also return sometime in Year 4 (later confirmed for Season 14). Bungie announced that they had at least two additional years of content planned out, with the Beyond Light expansion launching on November 10, 2020, followed by The Witch Queen and Lightfall afterwards—The Witch Queen was originally planned for November 2021, but was delayed to early 2022, with Lightfall being delayed to early 2023. By this point in the original Destiny's life cycle, a full sequel was the next release. Bungie stated that they did not want to do a Destiny 3 at this time because it would require them, as well as the players, to have to start over and they wanted to instead continue to build upon Destiny 2. A final chapter followed Lightfall—The Final Shape—and concluded the first saga of Destiny, called the "Light and Darkness Saga", before beginning what was intended to be a new saga for the franchise called the "Fate Saga".

In May 2020, Bungie affirmed its plans to release Destiny 2 for the next-generation consoles, PlayStation 5 and Xbox Series X, and that the game on these platforms would support native 4K resolution at 60fps. Xbox Series S, which was revealed after the announcement, would run at 1080p resolution instead. Bungie also confirmed that cross-play would be supported within the same family of consoles (e.g., PlayStation 4 and 5) at launch, and between all platforms starting with Season 15 later in 2021. The PlayStation 5 and Xbox Series X/S versions of the game were released on December 8, 2020. Destiny 2 players on PlayStation 4 and Xbox One can update their versions to the newer consoles within the same family for free and bring existing content across, with Bungie using Microsoft's "Smart Delivery" program for the Xbox Series X/S update. Field of view customization was also added.

As part of general growth of the company, Bungie announced in early 2021 that it was looking to expand the Destiny IP beyond video games and creating a "Destiny Universe". As part of this, in March 2021, Destiny 2's current leads Luke Smith and Mark Noseworthy were named as executive creative director and vice president, respectively, of Bungie's new Destiny Universe division, while Justin Truman was named to general manager for Destiny 2.

At the end of each content year, Bungie would package all preceding expansions into a bundle, branded as a "Legacy Collection". As a result of the game ending active development, Bungie packaged all available expansions, content packs, and dungeon keys into a bundle called Destiny 2: The Collection on June 9, 2026.

=== Promotion and merchandise ===
In 2017, Bungie, Activision and Amazon released the Destiny 2 Ghost Skill for the Amazon Echo. The Alexa application allowed players to speak to Ghost to request information, manage equipment, locate online friends and receive suggestions about activities. North recorded more than 1,000 lines as Ghost for the application, with the responses changing according to the player's progress. A limited-edition Wi-Fi speaker shaped like Ghost was released to accompany the skill.

=== Post-release content ===
Destiny 2 content releases Original game, expansions (in bold), seasons, episodes, and major updates
2017	**Year 1 – Destiny 2 (The Red War)**
2017	***Curse of Osiris**
2018	***Warmind**
2018	**Year 2 – Forsaken**
2018	*Season of the Outlaw
2018	*Season of the Forge
2019	*Season of the Drifter
2019	*Season of Opulence
2019	**Year 3 – Shadowkeep**
2019	*Season of the Undying
2019	*Season of Dawn
2020	*Season of the Worthy
2020	*Season of Arrivals
2020	**Year 4 – Beyond Light**
2020	*Season of the Hunt
2021	*Season of the Chosen
2021	*Season of the Splicer
2021	*Season of the Lost
2021	*Bungie 30th Anniversary Pack
2022	**Year 5 – The Witch Queen**
2022	*Season of the Risen
2022	*Season of the Haunted
2022	*Season of Plunder
2022	*Season of the Seraph
2023	**Year 6 – Lightfall**
2023	*Season of Defiance
2023	*Season of the Deep
2023	*Season of the Witch
2023	*Season of the Wish
2024	*Into the Light
2024	**Year 7 – The Final Shape**
2024	*Episode: Echoes
2024	*Episode: Revenant
2025	*Episode: Heresy
2025	*Rite of the Nine
2025	**Year 8 – Year of Prophecy**
2025	Season: Reclamation
2025	***The Edge of Fate**
2025	*Major Update: Ash & Iron
2025	Season: Lawless
2025	***Renegades**
2026	*Major Update: Monument of Triumph

Prior to the console release, Bungie said that they had already begun working on post-release content. Bungie stated that their plan was to provide post-release content at a quicker rate than that of the original Destiny, which was criticized for not having enough content post-launch and between each of its expansions releases. One of the team's remedies for this were the Adventures and Lost Sectors activities that were added to the free roam Patrol mode. Bungie also announced the Expansion Pass prior to launch, which granted access to the first two expansions of the game. The in-game clan features became available a few days after the game's launch. The Guided Games feature became available on September 12 for the Nightfall activity, the game's first raid, "Leviathan", unlocked on September 13 (with the Guided Games in beta), and Trials of the Nine became available on September 15, along with the character Xûr from the original game, the exotic items vendor who only appears on the weekends (Trials of the Nine was removed at the end of Year 1). The three factions and their respective NPCs from the original game returned on September 26 for a new periodic Year 1 event, Faction Rally. The competitive Iron Banner PvP mode from the original returned on October 10. The prestige mode for the Leviathan raid was originally scheduled to unlock on October 10, but was delayed to October 17.

The game's first expansion released on December 5, 2017. Named Curse of Osiris, it focused on the character Osiris from the lore of the original Destiny. The expansion took players to the planet Mercury with its own patrol mode. Additionally, the EXP level cap was raised to 25 and the Power level cap was raised to 330. There was also a timed-exclusive Crucible map for PS4 players called Wormhaven. Instead of an entirely new raid, a feature called raid lair was added, featuring new areas to the existing Leviathan raid and a different final boss. This first one was "Leviathan: Eater of Worlds". The second expansion, Warmind, was released on May 8, 2018, and focused on the Warmind Rasputin from the original game. This expansion took players to the planet Mars in a new area called Hellas Basin. The expansion also featured a new mode called "Escalation Protocol", a horde mode which could be started by any player in the patrol mode on Mars. As well, the EXP level cap was raised to 30 and the Power level cap was raised to 380. In addition to Rasputin, a new character named Ana Bray (also from the lore of the original Destiny) was added, who served as the primary NPC on Mars. Like the previous expansion, Warmind also included a second raid lair on the Leviathan called "Leviathan: Spire of Stars". The expansion also added progressive ranking systems for PvP, titled Valor and Glory. Players earned Valor in quickplay matches while Glory was earned in competitive matches, with each new rank earning greater rewards. Valor points were earned regardless of win or loss, while Glory points were earned by wins but reduced by losses. Both expansions featured timed-exclusive content for the PlayStation 4 platform, which became available for other platforms in late 2019. Both expansions and all of their content were removed from the game with the introduction of the Destiny Content Vault in November 2020.

The third expansion, Forsaken, was released on September 4, 2018, beginning Year 2 of Destiny 2. Similar to the original game's The Taken King expansion, Forsaken had a large overhaul on gameplay, though not to the extent that The Taken King had with the original Destiny. A large expansion, Bungie described the story as having a "western revenge" theme. A large portion of the expansion took place in the Reef's Tangled Shore, including a new raid called "Last Wish", taking place in the end-game area, the Dreaming City, also located in the Reef. The developers claimed that it had more bosses than any previous raid (including from the original game) with a massive roam area, puzzles, and the raid changed over time based on players' actions in the raid itself. The expansion also introduced the game's first dungeon, "The Shattered Throne", a three-player activity similar to a raid that also takes place in the Dreaming City as well as the interdimensional ascendent plane. A new mode called Gambit was also added that combines PvE and PvP, and features its own ranking system called Infamy, which works similar to the Crucible's Valor ranking system. Two teams of four players compete against each other while facing PvE enemies, while a player from the enemy team may invade to impede progress. A new weapon type, a bow and arrow, was also added. The EXP level cap was raised to 50 and the Power level cap was raised to 600. A trailer displayed during Sony's E3 2018 press conference showed the death of Cayde-6 by the hands of the returning Prince Uldren Sov. Uldren was driven to find his lost sister, Queen Mara Sov, as he had believed she was still alive after the events of The Taken King, and he led the Scorn, former Fallen that were revived from the dead and had become their own race. The launch trailer for Forsaken revealed that the player's Guardian would once again speak; the player's Guardian had not spoken since the end of the original Destiny's base campaign. Forsaken also began a seasonal cycle of content for Destiny 2, introducing new story content, activities, and gear, some which required purchase of the annual pass. Forsaken itself was alternatively known as Season of the Outlaw, with its subsequent content of the annual pass including Season of the Forge in December 2018, which introduced the character of Ada-1 and the Black Armories which were under threat from Cabal, Fallen, and Vex forces, Season of the Drifter in March 2019, which explored the Drifter's connection to the mysterious Nine, and Season of Opulence in June 2019, during which Calus invited the Guardians to challenges aboard the Leviathan for his entertainment. Season of the Forge and Season of Opulence both added a new raid. The first was "Scourge of the Past", which took place within the Last City, while the second was "Crown of Sorrow", which took place on the Leviathan. The content of the annual pass was removed and placed in the DCV in November 2020, while Forsaken's campaign and The Tangled Shore destination and its associated activities were removed upon the launch of The Witch Queen in February 2022. The Dreaming City destination and end-game content remained and were repackaged under a content pack called the Forsaken Pack.

The fourth major expansion for the game, Shadowkeep, was released on October 1, 2019 (delayed from its original release of September 17) and was similar in scope to Forsaken and the original game's Rise of Iron expansion. The expansion, which began Year 3 of Destiny 2, sees players return to the Moon, an area that was featured in the first game. The location was reprised and expanded upon with Bungie claiming it to be twice the size of the original location from Destiny. The story of Shadowkeep sees the return of Eris Morn, a character from the first game who had been absent since the events of the Red War. Eris seeks the help of the Guardian in defeating "Nightmares" that she released into the Solar System, which are manifestations of the Guardian's past traumas. Players face off against their previous adversaries, which are being resurrected by the Darkness. Throughout the story, Eris and the Guardians work together to figure out the cause of this unleashed madness and do what they can to put a stop to it. The expansion includes a return to the Black Garden on Mars for a new raid, "Garden of Salvation", as well as a new dungeon on the Moon called "Pit of Heresy". Shadowkeep's seasonal content included Season of the Undying, which was available alongside the launch of the expansion and saw the Vanguard preventing a Vex invasion of the Moon by the Undying Mind, Season of Dawn in December 2019, where the Guardian aidd Orisis with the Sundial to prevent the Red Legion from altering the past and to bring back Saint-14 to the present, Season of the Worthy in March 2020, in which Zavala and Ana Bray enlisted the Vanguard to help Rasputin to stop the Almighty from crashing into the Last City, and Season of Arrivals in June 2020, where the Guardians helped protect Eris Morn from Taken and Hive as she tried to commune with the approaching Darkness and Pyramids of the Black Fleet. Season of the Worthy added the Trials of Osiris competitive PvP mode from the original game. Season of Arrivals then introduced another new dungeon, "Prophecy", which takes place within the mysterious realm of the Nine called Eternity. Upon the release of The Final Shape in June 2024, Shadowkeep's campaign was made free-to-play while the rest of its content was repackaged as the Shadowkeep Pack.

Year 4 of Destiny 2 began with the large expansion titled Beyond Light on November 10, 2020 (delayed from its original release date of September 22); Bungie described this release as the start of a new era for the franchise. The expansion introduces a new location, Jupiter's icy moon Europa, reintroduces Earth's Cosmodrome area from the original Destiny, which primarily served as the starting location for new players, and moved some older locations into the DCV, including Io, Mars, Mercury, Titan, and the Leviathan, which Bungie described as helping to better manage current content in the game in anticipation of future updates. Beyond Light also represented a major shift in the storytelling approach to Destiny 2 which had been experimented with in the Season of Arrivals, the last season of Shadowkeep. Senior narrative lead Julia Nardin stated that around Arrivals, the writing team started to explore a more serialized approach with their narrative content, and within Beyond Light, mapped out the major story elements of each season similar to a television show to be played out in six to eight segments over the course of that season, and having each season's story arc fit into a larger overall arcing storyline. Gameplay-wise, players learn a new elemental ability—the first new elemental ability introduced to the series since the original Destiny launched in September 2014. The new ability Stasis uses the power of Darkness itself rather than Light. The Exo Stranger, who had not been seen since the end of the original Destiny's campaign, also returned, along with Variks, the Loyal, from the original game's House of Wolves expansion—though he was an unseen character in Forsaken whose actions inadvertently caused the death of Cayde-6. The Exo Stranger and Variks guide the Guardian on Europa to stop a Fallen Kell named Eramis from using the Darkness to destroy the Traveler and its followers. A new raid was also added called "Deep Stone Crypt", taking place on Europa. Among its seasonal content included Season of the Hunt, which was available alongside the launch Beyond Light and focused on the return of an amnesic Uldren Sov, now a lightbearer going by "Crow", as he helped the Vanguard hunt down Hive Wrathborn, Season of the Chosen in February 2021, where Calus' daughter and now Empress Caiatl had come to the System to challenge the Vanguard to ritual combat as a prelude to a potential truce, Season of the Splicer in May 2021, where Mithrax, the Kell of the Fallen House of Light, helped the Vanguard put an end to a Vex attack on the Last City, and Season of the Lost in August 2021, which followed the return of Mara Sov, Queen of the Awoken, as she worked alongside the Guardian and Savathûn herself to help exorcise Savathûn's worm and exact revenge on the Witch Queen for her involvement in corrupting both her brother, Uldren Sov, and the Dreaming City during the events of Forsaken and the Last Wish Raid, as well as ensuring the return of Osiris, who Savathun herself admitted to kidnapping and pretending to take his place in order to prepare the armies of the Sol system for the coming battle with the Darkness. Crossplay functionality was added on August 24, 2021, with Season of the Lost, allowing players from all supported platforms to play together. Season of the Splicer also added the "Vault of Glass" raid from the original game. A content pack called the Bungie 30th Anniversary Pack was released in December 2021 as a mid-season update for Season of the Lost and added content inspired by Bungie's previous games as well as a new dungeon, "Grasp of Avarice", taking place in the Cosmodrome within the infamous "loot cave" of the original game. Upon the release of The Final Shape in June 2024, Beyond Light's campaign was made free-to-play while the rest of its content was repackaged as the Beyond Light Pack.

The Witch Queen expansion was released on February 22, 2022, beginning Year 5 of Destiny 2. The main focus is on the titular character, Savathûn, one of the three leaders of the Hive, who has been discreetly bringing in some citizens of the Last City under her control during events of Beyond Light. The expansion introduces Savathûn's Throne World within the Ascendant realm as a new area for gameplay, as well as Lucent Hive, Hive warriors that have been imbued with the power of the Light. A new weapon type, the glaive, was introduced, which has a balanced range of melee and projectile attacks. The expansion also introduces weapon crafting, initially with gear found in The Witch Queen expansion but eventually working in legacy equipment. A new raid, "Vow of the Disciple", was added, taking place within the Pyramid ship in the Throne World. Alongside The Witch Queen, Bungie planned to introduce a new raid or dungeon every three months, and began rotating raids and dungeons as they increased their availability. Among its seasonal content included the Season of the Risen, which was available alongside The Witch Queen and saw the operation to capture the Lucent Hive to gain intel on their plans resulting in the formation of the Coalition, an alliance against the Witness, a collective consciousness of the first civilization manifested in Darkness, Season of the Haunted in May 2022, where the Guardian helped Eris Morn sever Calus's connection to the Lunar Pyramid by helping Crow, Caiatl, and Zavala confront their traumas, Season of Plunder in August 2022, where they attempted to prevent Eramis from acquiring relics of Nezarec, a Disciple of the Witness, and Season of the Seraph in November 2022, which focused on Rasputin's return as the Witness returned to finish what it started during the Collapse and Osiris asks him about the visions of Neptune he learned from Savathûn. Season of the Haunted added the "Duality" dungeon, taking place within the Leviathan, Season of Plunder added the "King's Fall" raid from the original game, and Season of the Seraph added the "Spire of the Watcher" dungeon, taking place within a BrayTech facility on Mars.

Lightfall, released on February 28, 2023, began Year 6, taking place shortly after Rasputin sacrificed himself at end of the Season of the Seraph. It focuses on the Guardian as they race with the new Disciple of the Witness, Calus, to find the Veil on Neomuna and master another power of Darkness called Strand. A new raid, "Root of Nightmares", was added, taking place on a Pyramid ship of the Witness's Black Fleet. Among its seasonal content included the Season of Defiance which was available alongside Lightfall and saw the Coalition forces working together to rescue prisoners on Earth that had been captured by the Shadow Legion, Cabal soldiers that use Pyramid technology, Season of the Deep in May 2023, where Deputy Commander Sloane returned from Titan's capture with an ally named Ahsa, who had knowledge of the Witness's origins, Season of the Witch in August 2023, where they discovered a way to stop Xivu Arath by having Eris Morn ascend into the Hive God of Vengeance, Season of the Wish in November 2023, which had them recover Riven and Taranis's eggs in order to find a way to pass through the portal the Witness created into the Pale Heart of the Traveler at the end of the Lightfall campaign, and Into the Light a mid-season update for Season of the Wish in April 2024, where they defended the Last City from the Witness's forces as they waited for Crow and Osiris to form the bridge needed to allow the Guardians to enter the Pale Heart. Season of the Deep added the "Ghosts of the Deep" dungeon on Titan, Season of the Witch added the "Crota's End" raid from the original game, and Season of the Wish added the "Warlord's Ruin" dungeon, taking place in the European Dead Zone on Earth.

The Final Shape, which began Year 7, was the conclusion of the first saga for the Destiny franchise, called the "Light and Darkness" saga. It launched on June 4, 2024. Following this release, Bungie switched to an episodic model for ongoing content, with three episodes a year instead of the traditional four seasons. The episodes each had a three-act structure and more narrative aspects compared to previous seasons. The expansion focuses on Coalition forces entering the Pale Heart of the Traveler to prevent the Witness from acquiring the Traveler's Light to complete its vision of the final shape, and using a new power called Prismatic to allow Guardians to wield Light and Darkness in harmony. After the Witness is defeated by the Coalition in the Excision mission, the game's first and only 12-player activity that was unlocked after the World's First race for the "Salvation's Edge" raid was completed, its Darkness collided with the Traveler's Light to create paracausal artifacts called Echoes, setting the stage for the episodic structure that followed throughout the cycle. That included Episode: Echoes a week after the expansion's release, which focused on the Echo that was acquired by an entity called "The Conductor" after it landed on Nessus and changed the Vex, Episode: Revenant in October 2024, which focused on the Echo that was acquired by Fikrul, the antagonist from Forsaken who used its power to convert living Eliksni into a new breed of Scorn, and Episode: Heresy in February 2025, which focused on the Echo that was acquired by a commander of the Dread, a faction created by the Witness from templates of the Disciples it had cultivated throughout its pursuit to enact the final shape, after it landed on the Dreadnaught and awakened an eldritch force within the Hive ship. Episode: Revenant added the "Vesper's Host" dungeon, taking place on a BrayTech space station in Europa's orbit, and Episode: Heresy added the "Sundered Doctrine" dungeon taking place in the same Pyramid ship of the "Vow of the Disciple" raid from The Witch Queen. Halfway through Act 3 of Heresy had an update called Rite of the Nine in May 2025, which acted as a prologue to Year 8.

The 11th year of the Destiny franchise, and Year 8 of Destiny 2, launched in July 2025. This once again change the delivery model of content, as instead of one large expansion and then multiple seasons/episodes released over the course of the year, there were instead two large seasons that lasted several months with each beginning with a medium-sized expansion and then receiving one "major update" midway through each season. Bungie said the expansions would be about the size of Rise of Iron from the original Destiny, with the major updates about the size of the Into the Light update, which was a prelude to The Final Shape. During the reveal event on May 6, 2025, the new saga was revealed as "The Fate Saga" and was intended to be multiple years long. Year 8's first expansion, The Edge of Fate, was released on July 15, 2025, with its major update, Ash & Iron, releasing on September 9, followed by Year 8's second expansion, Renegades, on December 2, with its major update, Monument of Triumph, releasing on June 9, 2026; this update was originally scheduled for March 3 and to be titled Shadow & Order, but due to major revisions and change in scope, it was delayed and renamed. The first half of Year 8 containing The Edge of Fate and Ash & Iron was Season: Reclamation, with the second half of Year 8 containing Renegades and Monument of Triumph being Season: Lawless, with the entirety of Year 8 regarded as the "Year of Prophecy". The Edge of Fate has the Guardian traveling to the planetoid Kepler to investigate a distress signal where they learn that they must stop the collapse of a singularity that would destroy the entire Solar System and also learning of a mysterious prophecy of the Nine, while Renegades, which was the game's 10th and ultimately final expansion, sees the Guardian travel to the lawless frontier, areas on Mars, Venus, and Europa outside of the Vanguard's jurisdiction, where they confront Dredgen Bael and his Barant Imperium and stop them from using a super weapon that would kill all lightbearers. Renegades was heavily inspired by Star Wars, with Bungie partnering with Lucasfilm Games to help to build the narrative as well as gear in the expansion, like the new exotic sword, the Praxic Blade, Destiny 2's version of the lightsaber. The Edge of Fate had a new raid, "The Desert Perpetual", taking place in the mysterious realm of the Nine, while Renegades added a new dungeon, "Equilibrium", taking place in the lawless frontier on Venus.

Bungie had also announced the two Year 9 expansions as Shattered Cycle and The Alchemist. These were originally planned for summer and winter 2026, respectively. After Shadow & Order was delayed and renamed, the Year 9 expansions were initially delayed but ultimately canceled due to Bungie ending Destiny 2 support.

In addition to these expansions, Destiny 2 featured limited time seasonal events that recurred annually tied to real-world holidays, many introduced during its first year of service. These events were free to all players, offering unique gear and cosmetic items for completing special gameplay modes and quests offered during the event period, and new Triumph and Milestones for players to achieve. "The Dawning" event originated from Destiny and was themed around the holiday season, where players worked to craft special cookies to deliver to NPCs across the System. "Guardian Games" was a spring themed event typically associated with both the spring and summer seasons as well as the Summer Olympic Games. Each class of Guardian were challenged in a friendly contest to earn the most points for their class. "Solstice of Heroes" (later shortened to "Solstice") was originally introduced in 2018 to celebrate the end of the Red War campaign but since played out as a mid-year event, where players worked to improve special armor by completing various challenges. The "Festival of the Lost" was a Halloween-themed event, where players hunted down special enemies in spooky-themed versions of world areas to collect candy and gain rewards. "The Revelry" was a one-time event in 2019, which celebrated the start of spring; it was replaced by Guardian Games in 2020. "Crimson Days", the Valentine's Day-themed event from Year 2 (2016) of the original Destiny, featured a 2-versus-2 Crucible mode that encouraged teammates to stay close to improve their winning chances, but this was also retired in 2020. Limited time events ended following Bungie's announcement that they would be ending support for Destiny 2.

=== Future ===
On May 21, 2026, Bungie announced that the planned June 9 update, named as Monument of Triumph, would be the last live service content update for the game, after which, it would remain playable as with the original Destiny. The release includes gameplay updates that had been planned for the Shadow & Order update (which was renamed as Monument of Triumph), as well as new updates, such as new gear and armor systems for older dungeons and raids. These would also become available to use in all other existing content areas, and the update features the return of the Director menu to select activities. The announcement came after Sony took a US$765 million impairment loss on Bungie from its previous fiscal year, in particular due to poor performance of Marathon. Bungie stated that there were no immediate plans for a sequel at work, while Bloomberg News reported that development team layoffs were imminent. Sony announced these layoffs on June 25, 2026, laying off most of the Destiny team along with a portion of the Marathon team, as "necessary to align the studio's resources with its current priorities and long-term goals". In a post-development cycle reflection, the previously laid-off audio designer Nadia VanDriest recalled how they "all worked so hard to maintain the quality bar under unrealistic constraints".

Paul Tassi, a contributor to Forbes, reported that an anonymous source with knowledge of the situation attributed the game's struggles to two factors: ever-growing fan demand for content meant the game was only rarely profitable, and when it was profitable, those funds were often misused by Bungie's leadership. According to Tassi, before Bungie decided to end active development of the game, the studio had considered the possibility of a Destiny 3, but put more consideration into a relaunch of Destiny 2 under the title of Destiny Infinity due to production costs of making a full sequel. It was also reported that the developers had pitched the idea to return to their previous live service model of only doing one large expansion per year.

Following the announcement that Destiny 2 would receive no more updates, a fan-driven project called "Project Sunrise" was launched to use client-side tools to make content that had been sunset either as part of seasonal content or places in the DCV. This content, however, would be devoid of enemies or NPCs and would mainly allow players to revisit the old locations. In a studio update in September 2026, Bungie revealed their plans to unvault all content that had been placed in the DCV, including the worlds, strikes, and raids, saying this was the "first step to lay the foundation for how we reforge into new stories and games that you all deserve". There was no time table given, as the studio said it would take time to rebuild all of the removed content. Further updating their process in October 2026, Bungie said that they plan to unvault content in phases, the first phase will include all campaign content, strikes, and raids from Destiny 2's launch (the Red War) through the Curse of Osiris expansion, along with the Menagerie activity introduced in Beyond Light. It was anticipated that production would start in early 2027 and would take a year to prepare for release. Additional goals for the first phase, or to be introduced in later phase, would include the patrol spaces from these destinations, seasonal activities from the Season of Dawn in Shadowkeep through Season of the Wish in Lightfall, reprised raid weapons, and vaulted PvP maps. While yet planned, Bungie is also looking to bring an improved New Light experience for new players, story content from the previous seasons, and vaulted Gambit and social hubs, along with the possibility of legacy content from the first Destiny game.

== Reception ==
Reception

Aggregate score
Aggregator	Score
Metacritic	PS4: 85/100; XONE: 87/100; PC: 83/100

Review scores
Publication	Score
Destructoid	7.5/10
Electronic Gaming Monthly	8/10
Game Informer	9/10
GameRevolution	4.5/5
GameSpot	8/10
GamesRadar+	5/5
Giant Bomb	4/5
IGN	8.5/10
Polygon	9/10
VideoGamer.com	8/10

Destiny 2 received "generally favorable" reviews, according to review aggregator website Metacritic. Some reviewers labeled the game as Destiny 1.5 due to its many similarities to the original Destiny, but praise was given to improvements made over its predecessor.

As with the original, gameplay was highly praised, with Chris Carter of Destructoid saying that it was what "the game nails ... the most". Game Informer's Matt Miller said that like the original, "Gameplay features remarkably taut FPS gunplay enhanced with seemingly magical powers." Miller went on to say that the gameplay's biggest change was a welcome, referring to the reorganization of destinations and the emphasis on exploration. Evan Slead of Electronic Gaming Monthly (EGM) also praised the exploration, but was not a fan of the recategorization of the weapons. Although he said the variety of weapons were fun, the Kinetic weapons "didn't seem to pack as much of a punch as their Energy [weapon] counterparts." Cody Perez of Game Revolution, however, welcomed the recategorized weapons, saying they were less restrictive and said that "Bungie are masters of gun-play". Kallie Plagge of GameSpot said that the game features mostly the same structure as the original, including its "mechanically excellent shooting and satisfying loot grind". Carter praised the Lost Sectors and public events, as well as the additional story quests and Adventures post-campaign. Miller said that the Lost Sectors were fun, but they became less interesting with the more that were done. Perez, however, was not a fan of the Adventures and Lost Sectors activities, saying they were a "disconnect [from] the main campaign". He said that they were filler content, and that they were "monotonous and a bore to accomplish, lacking the heart that fills the campaign." He did praise the public events as they are only periodic.

The Leviathan raid received praise and criticism. Miller of Game Informer stated that the Leviathan raid was "one of Bungie's most intricate and fascinating environments to date", praising its maze-like structure with hidden chests and secret passages. He was critical of the award system, however, stating that it "separates the excitement of new gear from the moment of victory", as it does not offer most loot until a full completion. Slead of EGM said that "the bread and butter of Destiny is still these post-campaign quests", also referring to Strikes and the weekly Nightfall activity. Perez of Game Revolution, who did not play any of the original game's raids, was a big fan of the Leviathan raid, stating that it exceeded its hype. Plagge of GameSpot said that "solving [the raid's] often obscure puzzles can be both rewarding and frustrating", but "each failure teaches you something new".

The original Destiny was largely criticized for its story. Destiny 2, however, was praised for its improvements to the story and easier access to the universe's lore. Slead of EGM said that it has a "more robust story" and Bungie fixed the "meandering storytelling from the first". Carter of Destructoid said that although its story was similar to others in the same genre, "it's easy to follow and even easier to get invested in, with the game's cast coming front and center." Perez of Game Revolution said that the story "[gripped] me in a way that only Bungie's former series Halo was able to." He said that there were many moments that were of shock and awe, and that the game had a meaningful narrative with an actual fleshed out villain. Plagge of GameSpot said that the story serves its main purpose and that its strength "lie in atmosphere and side details", while also praising its "mournful soundtrack" as fantastic.

Miller of Game Informer praised the Crucible mode for feeling more competitive than the original Destiny's, with teamwork being "highly valued". However, Miller was "perplexed by the decision to force players into one of two playlists", instead of letting them choose. He was also indifferent to the change of making all modes four-versus-four, but said that "the compact group size demands everyone pull their weight, which is great." Perez of Game Revolution was disappointed that Crucible did not receive "the same love that the singleplayer had been given." He said that although the smaller map sizes were not a bad thing, it causes multiplayer to be non-stop action, not allowing players to take a moment to strategize. David Houghton of GamesRadar+ said that the changes to the Crucible mode "shine in a tight, focused, clear, and tactically co-operative format."

=== Sales ===
Destiny 2 sold 50,263 copies on PlayStation 4 within its first week on sale in Japan, which placed it at number one on the weekly sales charts. The weekend consisting of September 23, Destiny 2 took the number 1 spot on the UK sales chart. Destiny 2 was also the second highest-grossing console game of 2017 in North America (behind Call of Duty: WWII), and was also Activision's biggest PC release based on units sold. Digital downloads for Destiny 2 account for more than half of the total sales of the game.

Despite strong unit sales, the game failed to generate the recurring revenue that Activision wanted. As a result, Activision ended its publishing deal with Bungie in 2019. 2023 saw Bungie cut 8% of their staff due to a projected revenue miss of 45%.

=== Awards ===
For the 2017 Game Critics Awards, it was awarded Best PC Game for E3 2017. At The Game Awards 2017, Destiny 2 was one of four games to receive six nominations, the most for the year's event, which were for Best Art Direction, Best Score/Music, Best Audio Design, Best Ongoing Game, Best Action Game, and Best Multiplayer. Entertainment Weekly ranked Destiny 2 sixth on their list of the "Best Games of 2017", GamesRadar+ ranked it seventh on their list of the 25 Best Games of 2017, and Eurogamer also ranked it seventh on their list of the "Top 50 Games of 2017", while Polygon ranked it 12th on their list of the 50 best games of 2017, and The Verge named it as one of their 15 Best Games of 2017. In Game Informer's Reader's Choice Best of 2017 Awards, the game came in second place for "Best Co-op Multiplayer" and for "Best Shooter". The website also gave it the "Best Weaponry" and "Best Gunplay" in their 2017 Shooter of the Year Awards.

Destiny 2 was nominated for "Best PC Game" in both Destructoid's Game of the Year Awards 2017 and IGN's Best of 2017 Awards, the latter of which also nominated it for "Game of the Year", "Best Xbox One Game", "Best Shooter", "Best Graphics", "Best Original Music", and "Best Multiplayer". The game won the award for "Best Co-op Game" in PC Gamer's 2017 Game of the Year Awards, and received a nomination for "Game of the Year". It was also a runner-up each for "Best-Looking Game", "Best Multiplayer", and "Game of the Year" in Giant Bomb's 2017 Game of the Year Awards.

Year	Award	Category	Result	Ref.
2017	Game Critics Awards 2017	Best PC Game	Won	
2017	Game Critics Awards 2017	Best Action Game	Nominated	
2017	Game Critics Awards 2017	Best Online Multiplayer	Nominated	
2017	Gamescom 2017	Best Console Game (PlayStation 4)	Nominated	
2017	Gamescom 2017	Best PC Game	Nominated	
2017	Gamescom 2017	Best Action Game	Nominated	
2017	Gamescom 2017	Best Social/Online Game	Won	
2017	Gamescom 2017	Best Multiplayer Game	Won	
2017	Ping Awards	Best International Game	Nominated	
2017	Golden Joystick Awards 2017	Best Audio	Nominated	
2017	Golden Joystick Awards 2017	Best Gaming Performance (Nathan Fillion)	Nominated	
2017	Golden Joystick Awards 2017	Best Multiplayer Game	Nominated	
2017	Golden Joystick Awards 2017	Ultimate Game of the Year	Nominated	
2017	The Game Awards 2017	Best Art Direction	Nominated	
2017	The Game Awards 2017	Best Score/Music	Nominated	
2017	The Game Awards 2017	Best Audio Design	Nominated	
2017	The Game Awards 2017	Best Ongoing Game	Nominated	
2017	The Game Awards 2017	Best Action Game	Nominated	
2017	The Game Awards 2017	Best Multiplayer	Nominated	
2017	Titanium Awards	Best Action Game	Nominated	
2018	New York Game Awards 2018	Herman Melville Award for Best Writing	Nominated	
2018	New York Game Awards 2018	Tin Pan Alley Award for Best Music in a Game	Nominated	
2018	New York Game Awards 2018	Statue of Liberty Award for Best World	Nominated	
2018	16th Visual Effects Society Awards	Outstanding Compositing in a Photoreal Commercial (New Legends Will Rise)	Nominated	
2018	21st Annual D.I.C.E. Awards	Action Game of the Year	Nominated	
2018	21st Annual D.I.C.E. Awards	Outstanding Achievement in Online Gameplay	Nominated	
2018	21st Annual D.I.C.E. Awards	Outstanding Achievement in Sound Design	Nominated	
2018	NAVGTR Awards	Art Direction, Fantasy	Nominated	
2018	NAVGTR Awards	Game, Franchise Action	Nominated	
2018	NAVGTR Awards	Graphics, Technical	Nominated	
2018	NAVGTR Awards	Original Dramatic Score, Franchise	Nominated	
2018	NAVGTR Awards	Performance in a Drama, Lead (Nathan Fillion)	Nominated	
2018	NAVGTR Awards	Use of Sound, Franchise	Nominated	
2018	2018 Italian Video Game Awards	People's Choice	Nominated	
2018	2018 Italian Video Game Awards	Best Audio	Nominated	
2018	2018 Italian Video Game Awards	Best Evolving Game (Curse of Osiris)	Nominated	
2018	SXSW Gaming Awards 2018	Excellence in Multiplayer	Nominated	
2018	Game Developers Choice Awards	Best Technology	Nominated	
2018	16th Annual Game Audio Network Guild Awards	Best Interactive Score	Nominated	
2018	16th Annual Game Audio Network Guild Awards	Best Dialogue	Nominated	
2018	16th Annual Game Audio Network Guild Awards	Best Audio Mix	Nominated	
2018	16th Annual Game Audio Network Guild Awards	Best Original Choral Composition ("Last Rite")	Nominated	
2018	14th British Academy Games Awards	Audio Achievement	Nominated	
2018	ASCAP Composers' Choice Awards 2018	2017 ASCAP Video Game Score of the Year	Nominated	
2018	Game Critics Awards 2018	Best Online Multiplayer (Forsaken)	Nominated	
2018	Game Critics Awards 2018	Best Ongoing Game (Forsaken)	Nominated	
2018	Gamescom 2018	Best Add-on/DLC (Forsaken)	Won	
2018	Golden Joystick Awards 2018	Still Playing Award	Nominated	
2018	The Game Awards 2018	Best Ongoing Game	Nominated	
2018	The Game Awards 2018	Best Action Game (Forsaken)	Nominated	
2018	The Game Awards 2018	Best Multiplayer Game (Forsaken)	Nominated	
2018	Gamers' Choice Awards	Fan Favorite Multiplayer Game (Forsaken)	Nominated	
2018	Gamers' Choice Awards	Fan Favorite Shooter Game (Forsaken)	Nominated	
2019	22nd Annual D.I.C.E. Awards	Action Game of the Year (Forsaken)	Nominated	
2019	22nd Annual D.I.C.E. Awards	Online Game of the Year (Forsaken)	Nominated	
2019	SXSW Gaming Awards 2019	Excellence in Multiplayer (Forsaken)	Nominated	
2019	SXSW Gaming Awards 2019	Most Evolved Game (Forsaken)	Nominated	
2019	17th Annual Game Audio Network Guild Awards	Best Original Choral Composition (Forsaken; "Keep of Voices")	Nominated	
2019	15th British Academy Games Awards	Evolving Game (Forsaken)	Nominated	
2019	Italian Video Game Awards 2019	Best Evolving Game (Forsaken)	Nominated	
2019	ASCAP Composers' Choice Awards 2019	2018 ASCAP Video Game Score of the Year (Forsaken)	Nominated	
2019	Game Critics Awards 2019	Best Ongoing Game	Won	
2019	Golden Joystick Awards 2019	Best Game Expansion (Shadowkeep)	Nominated	
2019	Golden Joystick Awards 2019	Still Playing	Nominated	
2019	The Game Awards 2019	Best Ongoing Game	Nominated	
2019	The Game Awards 2019	Best Community Support	Won	
2020	23rd Annual D.I.C.E. Awards	Online Game of the Year (Shadowkeep)	Nominated	
2020	16th British Academy Games Awards	Evolving Game	Nominated	
2020	18th Annual Game Audio Network Guild Awards	Best Cinematic Cutscene Audio (Shadowkeep)	Nominated	
2020	ASCAP Composers' Choice Awards 2020	2019 ASCAP Video Game Score of the Year (Shadowkeep)	Nominated	
2020	The Game Awards 2020	Best Ongoing Game	Nominated	
2020	The Game Awards 2020	Best Community Support	Nominated	
2021	Golden Joystick Awards 2021	Best Game Community	Nominated	
2021	Golden Joystick Awards 2021	Still Playing Award	Nominated	
2021	The Game Awards 2021	Best Community Support (Beyond Light)	Nominated	
