= Centaurus (Greek mythology) =

Father of centaurs in Greek mythology

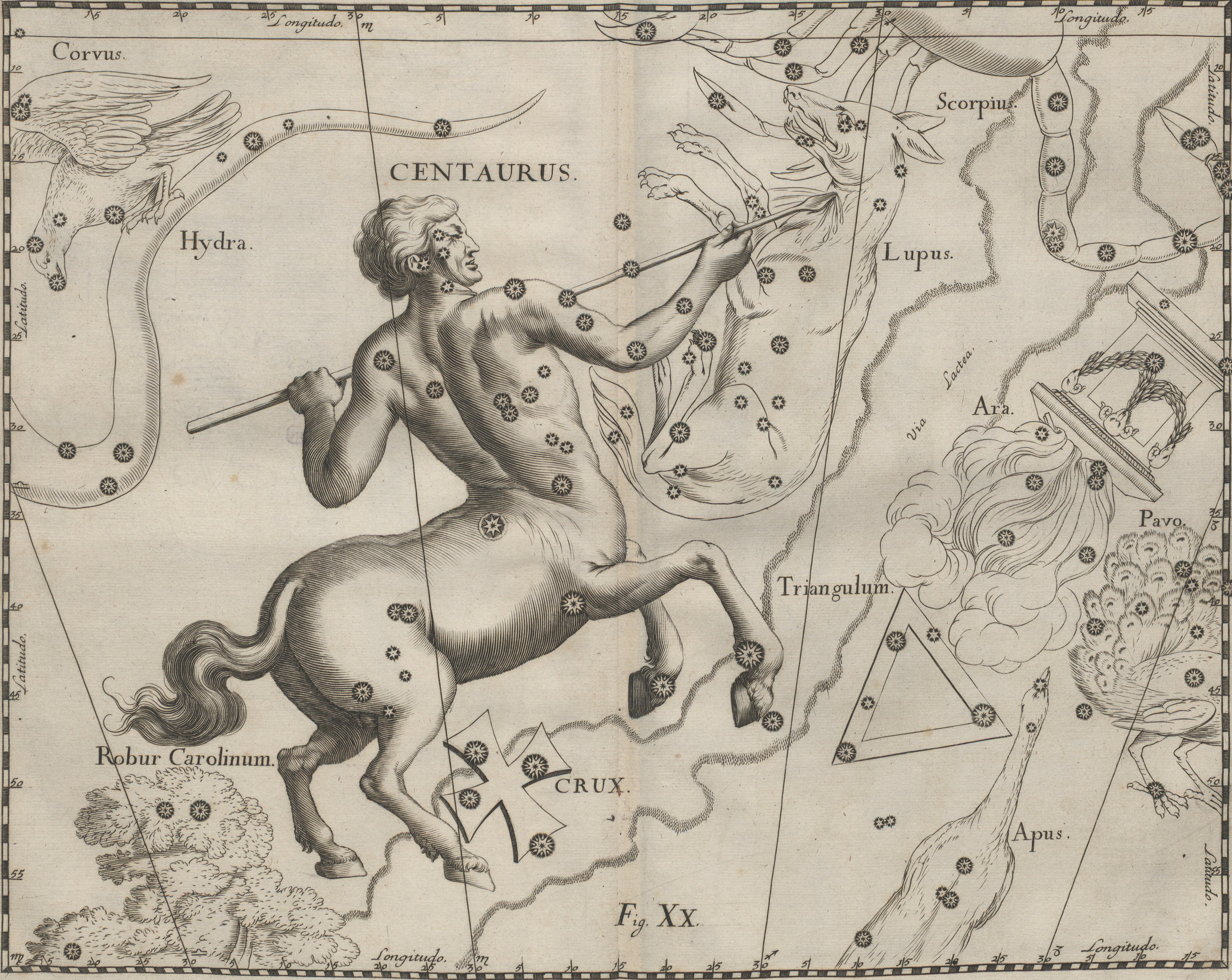
An illustration of the Centaurus and Lupus constellation

In Greek mythology, Centaurus (Ancient Greek: Κένταυρος, romanized: Kentauros) is the mythical ancestor and progenitor of the Centaurs or Ixionidae (Ιξιονίδαι, Ixionidai). The Centaurs are half-man, half horse; having the torso of a man extending where the neck of a horse should be. They were a kindred people with the Lapiths and were said to be wild, savage, and lustful.

== Mythology ==
Classical sources record two differing parentage traditions for him.

=== Son of Ixion and Nephele ===
After Ixion, king of the Lapiths, fell into insanity and was ostracized by his people, Zeus sympathized greatly with Ixion and brought him up to Olympus to dine with the gods. There Ixion saw Hera, Zeus' wife and queen of the gods, with whom he fell instantly in love and began to desire her sexually. Zeus, suspicious of Ixion, set for him a trap by fashioning a figure from cloud (Nephele) in the likeness of Hera and laying it next to Ixion whilst he was asleep in a field. When Ixion awoke, he began to make love to Hera's double, which so enraged Zeus that he drove Ixion from Mount Olympus, struck him with a thunderbolt, and damned Ixion to be eternally bound to a flying burning wheel that would spin around the heavens non-stop (though it was later moved to Tartarus).

Nephele's child by this union was Centaurus, a deformed child who hunched over and found no peace amongst other humans, and so removed to the mountain of Pelion. There he mated with the Magnesian mares who lived there. This resulted in the birth of the centaur race.

=== Son of Apollo ===
According to Diodorus Siculus he was the son of Apollo and Stilbe, daughter of the river-god Peneius and the naiad Creusa. According to this tradition he is the twin brother of the hero Lapithes.

== Constellation ==
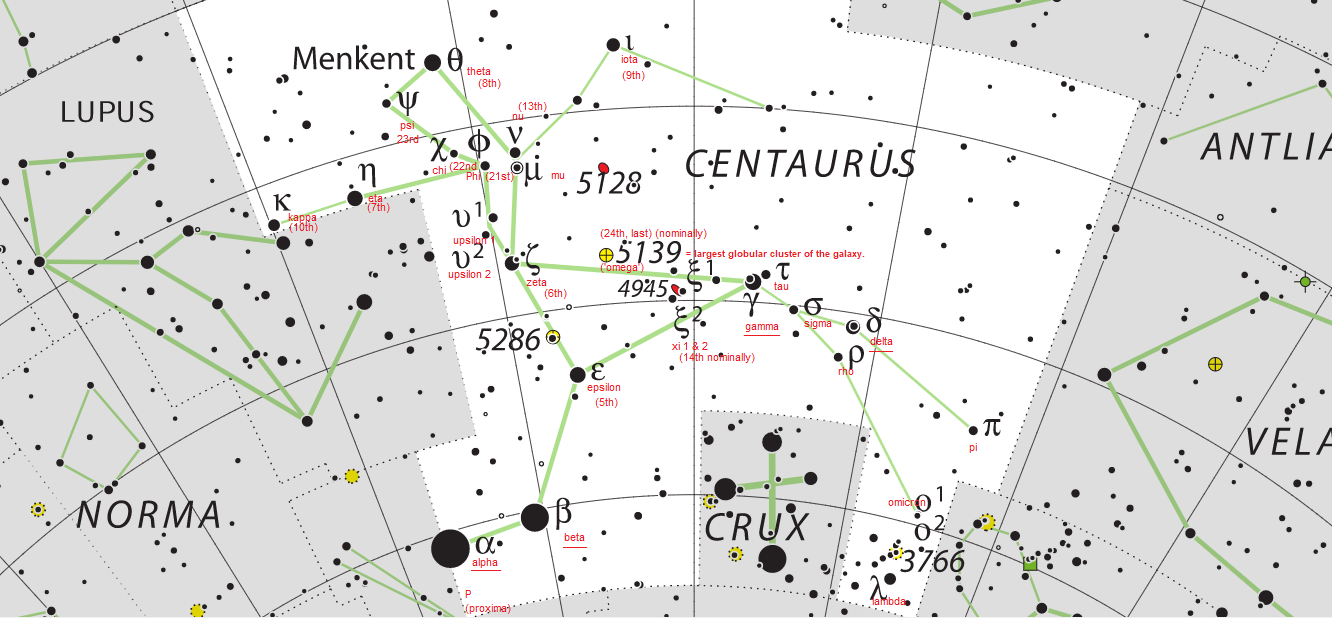
Chart depicting the constellation of Centaurus

Centaurus was the first person to group stars into constellations and taught others how to read them. One explanation of the constellation is that Centaurus put a picture of himself in the sky to guide his sailor friends the Argonauts.

The most popular interpretation of the constellation is as the form of Chiron. Chiron was the king of the centaurs and unlike his race he was intelligent and wise. So wise, in fact, that he tutored Heracles who became one of his great friends. The myth goes that Heracles was visiting his dear friend Pholus. Pholus was a centaur and was having dinner with Heracles. After dinner was over Heracles decided that he was thirsty and took it upon himself to get some wine. The wine that he took, however, was the sacred wine of the centaurs. It was meant to only be drunk by the centaurs and only on special occasions. Pholus saw this and could not muster up the courage to tell his strong friend that he was not allowed to drink the wine. It was not long before the sacred scent reached the other centaurs. The infuriated centaurs grabbed weapons and charged towards Pholus' house. The coward Pholus fled almost immediately and left Heracles to fend for himself. Heracles killed several of the centaurs and soon enough of them were dead that the rest became afraid and tried to flee. Upon shooting at the fleeing beasts, Heracles' poison arrow grazed the knee of Chiron. Chiron was not involved in the fight but came out to try to stop it. The immortal Chiron could not die from his wound and thus would be doomed to live in great pain forever. He cried to Zeus to give him relief and end his life. Zeus took pity on the centaur and let him die. To honour him, Zeus gave Chiron a place amongst the stars.
