= 5145 Pholus =

Centaur

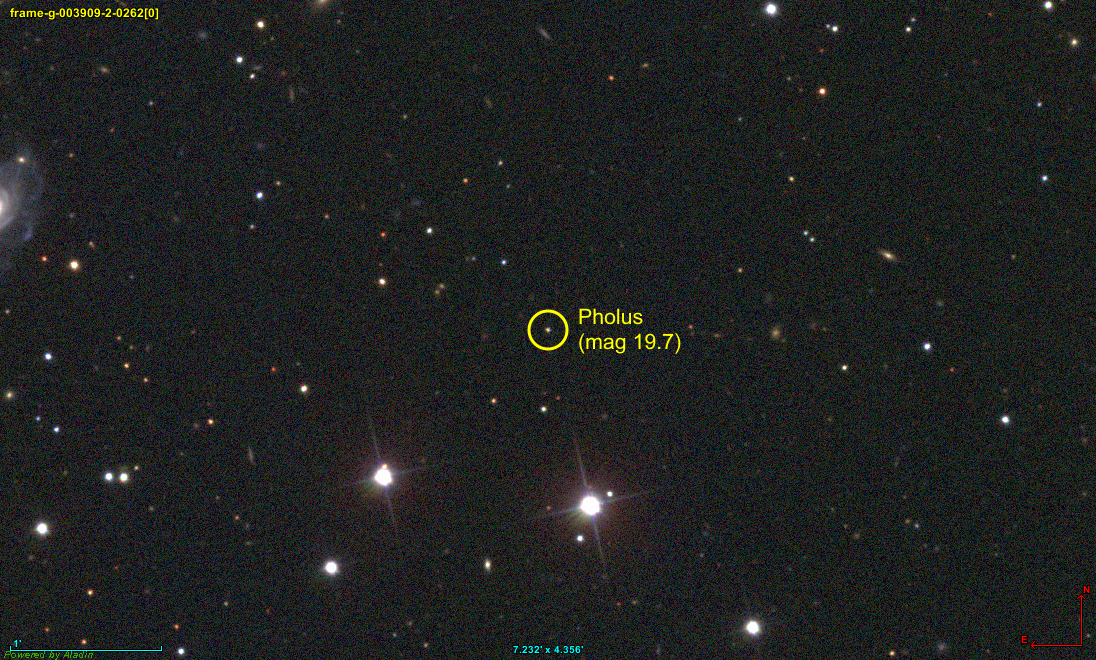
- Pholus (circled) photographed by the Sloan Digital Sky Survey at Apache Point Observatory on 28 April 2003

Discovery
- Discovered by: Spacewatch; (D. Rabinowitz uncredited)
- Discovery site: Kitt Peak National Obs.
- Discovery date: 9 January 1992

Designations
- Pronunciation: /ˈfoʊləs/
- Named after: Φόλος Pholos (Greek mythology)
- Alternative designations: 1992 AD
- Minor planet category: centaur; distant
- Symbol: or (astrological)

Orbital characteristics
- Epoch 1 July 2021 (JD 2459396.5)
- Uncertainty parameter 1 · 0
- Observation arc: 40.74 yr (14,881 d)
- Earliest precovery date: 22 July 1977
- Aphelion: 31.943 AU
- Perihelion: 8.7531 AU
- Semi-major axis: 20.348 AU
- Eccentricity: 0.5698
- Orbital period (sidereal): 91.79 yr (33,526 d)
- Mean anomaly: 117.26°
- Mean motion: 0° 0^{m} 38.52^{s} / day
- Inclination: 24.617°
- Longitude of ascending node: 119.44°
- Argument of perihelion: 354.77°
- Jupiter MOID: 3.495 AU
- Saturn MOID: 0.34961
- T_{Jupiter}: 3.21

Physical characteristics
- Mean diameter: 99±15 km
- Synodic rotation period: 9.980 h
- Geometric albedo: 0.155±0.076
- Spectral type: Tholen = Z; RR (very red); RR-U; B−V = 1.19; V−R = 0.78
- Apparent magnitude: 21.62; 16.3 (Perihelic opposition)
- Absolute magnitude (H): 7.1; 7.198±0.056 (R); 7.63

5145 Pholus /ˈfoʊləs/ is an eccentric centaur in the outer Solar System, around 100 kilometers (62 miles) in diameter, that crosses the orbit of both Saturn and Neptune.

It was discovered on 9 January 1992 by American astronomer David Rabinowitz (uncredited) of UA's Spacewatch survey at the Kitt Peak National Observatory in Arizona, United States. The very reddish object has an elongated shape and a rotation period of 9.98 hours. It was named after the centaur Pholus from Greek mythology.

== Discovery and naming ==
Pholus was discovered by David Rabinowitz (not officially credited), working with the Spacewatch program, at Kitt Peak National Observatory on 9 January 1992. Rabinowitz's discovery was confirmed by Eugene and Carolyn Shoemaker who identified the object on images they previously took on 1 January 1992. The discovery was announced by James Scotti on 23 January 1992 in an IAU Circular (IAUC 5434) of the Central Bureau for Astronomical Telegrams. A first precovery was taken at the Australian Siding Spring Observatory in 1977, extending the centaur's observation arc by 15 years prior to its discovery. It was the second discovery of a centaur after 2060 Chiron discovered by Charles Kowal in 1977. In 1993, while with the Spacewatch program, David Rabinowitz went on to discover another centaur, 7066 Nessus.

This minor planet was named by the Minor Planet Names Committee for Pholus, a centaur from Greek mythology. As with 2060 Chiron, named after his brother Chiron, the tradition is to name this class of outer planet-crossing objects after the half-human, half-horse mythological creatures. In the mythological account, Pholus died from a self-inflicted wound from a poisoned arrow used by Heracles (see 5143 Heracles), who buried Pholus on the mountain Pholoe. The official naming citation was published by the Minor Planet Center on 14 July 1992 (M.P.C. 20523).

A symbol derived from that for 2060 Chiron, U+2BDB ⯛ PHOLUS, was devised in the late 1990s by German astrologer Robert von Heeren. It replaces Chiron's K with a P for Pholus. A common variant,, uses a Greek φ.

== Orbit and classification ==
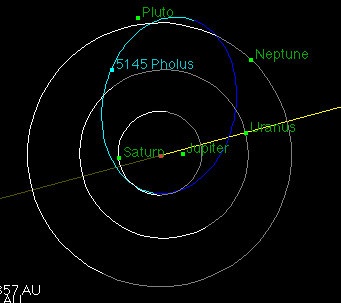
Orbital diagram of 5145 Pholus

Pholus was the second centaur to be discovered. Centaurs are objects in between the asteroid and trans-Neptunian populations of the Solar System – that is, beyond Jupiter's and within Neptune's orbit – which behave with characteristics of both asteroids and comets.

It orbits the Sun at a distance of 8.8–31.9 AU once every 91 years and 9 months (33,526 days; semi-major axis of 20.35 AU). Its orbit has an eccentricity of 0.57 and an inclination of 25° with respect to the ecliptic. It is a Saturn-, Uranus- and Neptune-crosser, crossing the orbits of these giant planets at a mean distance of 9.6, 19.1, and 30.1 AU from the Sun, respectively. Pholus has not come within one astronomical unit of a planet since 764 BC, and will not until 5290. It is believed that it originated in the Kuiper belt.

== Physical characteristics ==
=== Spectral type and color ===
After its discovery, Pholus was quickly found to be very red in color. The color has been speculated to be due to organic compounds on its surface. It is classified as a Z-class object on the Tholen taxonomic scheme.

The object has been classified by astronomers as RR and RR-U type, respectively. Polarimetric observations with ESO's Very Large Telescope in 2007 and 2008, revealed noticeable negative polarization at certain phase angles, distinctly different from that of trans-Neptunian objects. Pholus appears to have a rather homogeneous surface with a small amount of water frost on its darker regions.

The surface composition of Pholus has been estimated from its reflectance spectrum using two spatially segregated components: dark amorphous carbon and an intimate mixture of water ice, methanol ice, olivine grains, and complex organic compounds (tholins). The carbon black component was used to match the low albedo of the object. Unlike Chiron, Pholus has shown no signs of cometary activity.

=== Diameter and albedo ===
Comparison of sizes, albedos, and colors of various large centaurs with measured diameters. Pholus is shown in the middle row, second from right.

Diameter calculations range from 99 to 190 kilometers with a corresponding albedo between 0.155 and 0.04.

According to the Herschel Space Observatory with its PACS instrument, Pholus measures 99 kilometers in diameter and its surface has an albedo of 0.155, while a study from 1996 derived a diameter of 185 km. During 2003–2004, observations with the 1.8-meter Vatican Advanced Technology Telescope (VATT) on Mount Graham Observatory, Arizona, determined an elongated shape, 310 km × 160 km × 150 km, with a mean diameter of 190 kilometers, based on an outdated low albedo of 0.04. Johnston's archive lists a diameter of 107 km with an albedo of 0.126.

=== Rotation period ===
In March 2005, a rotational lightcurve of Pholus was obtained from photometric observations by Tegler using the VATT at Mount Graham. Lightcurve analysis gave a rotation period of 9.980 hours with a brightness amplitude of 0.60 magnitude (U=3-). Alternative period determinations were also conducted by Hoffmann, Franham, and Buie with concurring results of 9.977, 9.982, and 9.983 hours, respectively (U=3/3/3).

== See also ==
- List of centaurs (small Solar System bodies) § 5145
