= Agastrophus =

In Greek mythology, Agastrophus (Ancient Greek: Ἀγάστροφος) is a Paionian "hero", "famed for his spear", fighting on the side of Troy in the Trojan War, killed by Diomedes. He was the son of Paeon and brother of Laophoon.

== Mythology ==
Agastrophus' death comes about as the result of a lapse in judgment. Under the influence of Ate, a kind of judgmental blindness, Agastrophus made the fatal mistake of leaving his chariot too far behind him, thus being unable to escape when he was wounded by Diomedes. After killing him Diomedes strips the "gleaming corselet of valiant Agastrophus from about his breast, and the shield from off his shoulder, and his heavy helm".
