= 7066 Nessus =

Very red centaur on an eccentric orbit beyond Saturn in the outer Solar System

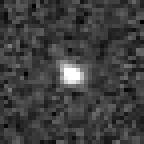
- Hubble Space Telescope image of Nessus taken in 2009

Discovery
- Discovered by: Spacewatch (D. Rabinowitz uncredited)
- Discovery site: Kitt Peak National Obs.
- Discovery date: 26 April 1993

Designations
- Pronunciation: /ˈnɛsəs/
- Named after: Νέσσος Nessos (Greek mythology)
- Alternative designations: 1993 HA_{2}
- Minor planet category: centaur · distant
- Adjectives: Nessian /ˈnɛsiən/
- Symbol: (astrological)

Orbital characteristics
- Epoch 27 April 2019 (JD 2458600.5)
- Uncertainty parameter 3
- Observation arc: 11.08 yr (4,048 d)
- Aphelion: 37.423 AU
- Perihelion: 11.854 AU
- Semi-major axis: 24.639 AU
- Eccentricity: 0.5189
- Orbital period (sidereal): 122.30 yr (44,670 d)
- Mean anomaly: 80.046°
- Mean motion: 0° 0^{m} 29.16^{s} / day
- Inclination: 15.663°
- Longitude of ascending node: 31.183°
- Argument of perihelion: 170.96°
- Jupiter MOID: 6.400 AU
- T_{Jupiter}: 3.793

Physical characteristics
- Mean diameter: 57±17 km 60±16 km
- Geometric albedo: 0.065; 0.086
- Spectral type: RR (very red); B–V = 1.090±0.010; V–R = 0.790±0.010; V–I = 1.470±0.030; B–R = 1.847
- Apparent magnitude: 24.31
- Absolute magnitude (H): 9.55; 9.6

7066 Nessus /ˈnɛsəs/ is a very red centaur on an eccentric orbit, located beyond Saturn in the outer Solar System. It was discovered on 26 April 1993, by astronomers of the Spacewatch program at the Kitt Peak National Observatory in Tucson, Arizona. The dark and reddish minor planet is likely elongated and measures approximately 60 kilometers (37 miles) in diameter. It was named after Nessus from Greek mythology.

== Orbit and classification ==
Nessus is a centaur, a dynamically unstable population of minor planets between the classical asteroids and the trans-Neptunian objects. It orbits the Sun at a distance of 11.9–37.4 AU once every 122 years and 4 months (44,670 days; semi-major axis of 24.64 AU). Its orbit has an eccentricity of 0.52 and an inclination of 16° with respect to the ecliptic. At its perihelion (11.9 AU), it moves much closer to the Sun than Uranus (19.2 AU) but not as close as Saturn (9.6 AU), while at its aphelion (37.4 AU), it moves out well beyond the orbit of Neptune (30.1 AU).

The orbits of centaurs are unstable due to perturbations by the giant planets. Nessus is an "SE object" because currently Saturn controls its perihelion and its aphelion is within the Kuiper belt. It is estimated to have a relatively long orbital half-life of about 4.9 million years. Fifty clones of the orbit of Nessus suggest that it will not pass within 1 AU (or 150 million kilometers) of any planet for at least 20,000 years.

== Discovery and naming ==
Nessus was discovered by David Rabinowitz (not officially credited), working with the Spacewatch program, at Kitt Peak National Observatory on 26 April 1993. The discovery was announced on 13 May 1993 in an IAU Circular (IAUC 5789) of the Central Bureau for Astronomical Telegrams. It was the third discovery of a centaur after 2060 Chiron and 5145 Pholus, discovered by Charles Kowal and David Rabinowitz in 1977 and 1992, respectively. The body's observation arc begins with its official discovery observation at Kitt Peak in April 1993.

This minor planet was named after Nessus, a centaur from Greek mythology, who poisoned and was killed by the divine hero Heracles. The official naming citation was published by the Minor Planet Center on 22 April 1997 (M.P.C. 29671).

A symbol derived from that for 2060 Chiron, U+2BDC ⯜ NESSUS, was devised in the late 1990s by German astrologer Robert von Heeren. It replaces Chiron's K with an N for Nessus.

== Physical characteristics ==
Nessus has a very red color (RR), with a B–R magnitude of 1.847 and 1.88, respectively. Color indices were also determined by Bauer (2003) and Hainaut (2002, 2012).

=== Rotation period ===
As of 2018, no rotational lightcurve of Nessus has been obtained from photometric observations. However, a brightness variation of 0.5 magnitude was measured in the 1990s, indicating that the body has a non-spherical, elongated shape. The body's rotation period and pole remain unknown.

=== Diameter and albedo ===
According to the Herschel Space Observatory with its PACS instrument, Nessus measures 57 kilometers in diameter and its surface has an albedo of 0.086, while infrared observations with the Spitzer Space Telescope gave a diameter of 60 kilometers with an albedo of 0.065. The Collaborative Asteroid Lightcurve Link assumes a carbonaceous standard albedo of 0.057 and derives a diameter of 68.48 kilometers based on an absolute magnitude of 9.55.

== In popular culture ==
Nessus is a playable destination in the 2017 video game Destiny 2, after previously being referenced in the series' 2014 debut entry Destiny. Known simply as "Nessus", it is described as a planetoid that has been terraformed by a cybernetic species known as the Vex into a "machine world".

== See also ==
- List of centaurs (small Solar System bodies) § 7066
