= Nephele =

Greek goddess of hospitality

- Cloud nymph
- Member of the Athamantian Royal House
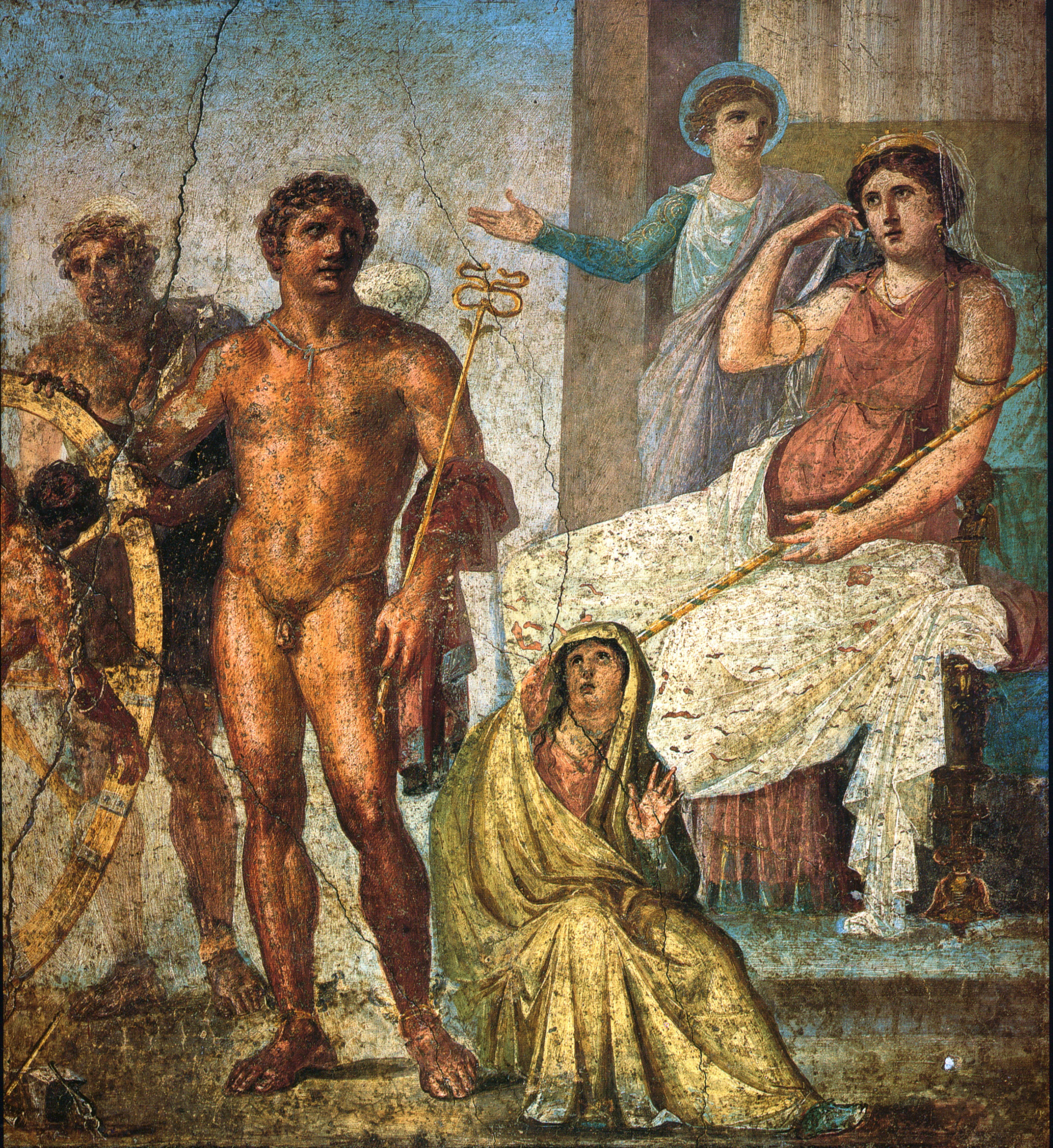
- Punishment of Ixion; Nephele sitting at Mercury's feet. Roman fresco in the House of the Vettii Pompeii
- Abode: Thessaly, then Boeotia
- Parents: Formed from a cloud by Zeus
- Consort: Ixion, Athamas
- Offspring: Centaurus, Phrixus and Helle

In Greek and Roman mythology, Nephele (/ˈnɛfəliː/; Ancient Greek: Νεφέλη, romanized: Nephélē, lit. 'cloud, mass of clouds';) called Nebula by Latin authors, is the name of two figures associated with clouds, who figure respectively in the stories of Ixion and in the story of Phrixus and his sister Helle.

== Mythology ==
=== The transformed cloud ===
Nephele was the name of an eidolon sculpted in the image of Hera by Zeus, in order to deceive Ixion after the latter had violated Zeus' Xenia by attempting to force himself on Hera. Hera told Zeus of Ixion's attempt and, in order to test him, Zeus made a cloud in the image of her, which Ixion later assaulted, an act for which he was punished by Zeus. Her assault by Ixion left her pregnant. Nephele later gave birth to a monstrous son, which she raised and named Centaurus.

=== The wife of Athamas ===
Nephele is also the name of the wife Athamas, son of Aeolus, son of Hellen, the progenitor of the Greeks, and by him was the mother of a son, Phrixus, and a daughter, Helle. Athamas then later married Ino, daughter of Cadmus, the founder of Thebes, who hatched a devious plot to get rid of the twins, roasting all the town's crop seeds so they would not grow. The local farmers, frightened of famine, asked a nearby oracle for assistance. Ino bribed the men sent to the oracle to lie and tell the others that the oracle required the sacrifice of Phrixus. Before he could be killed, though, Phrixus and Helle were rescued by Nephele and sent on a flying golden ram, which she had received from Hermes, to Colchis, to King Aeëtes.

As they were flying over the sea, Helle fell off the ram into what was afterwards called the Hellespont (named after her, meaning Sea of Helle) and drowned. Phrixus survived all the way to Colchis, where King Aeëtes took him in and treated him kindly, giving Phrixus his daughter, Chalciope, in marriage. In gratitude, Phrixus gave the king the Golden Fleece of the Golden Ram, which Aeëtes hung in a tree in his kingdom. The Golden Fleece would later be taken by Jason and his Argonauts.

== See also ==
- Aries (constellation)
- Ganesha
- Nephilim
- Sylph
