= Paeon (son of Poseidon) =

Figure from Greek mythology

In Greek mythology, Paeon or Paion (Ancient Greek: Παίων, gen.: Παίονος) was a son of Poseidon by Helle, who fell into the Hellespont. In some legends he was called Edonus. He was the brother of the giant Almops.
