= Helle (mythology) =

Ancient Greek mythological figure

- Boeotian princess and Eponym of Hellespont
- Member of the Athamantian Royal House
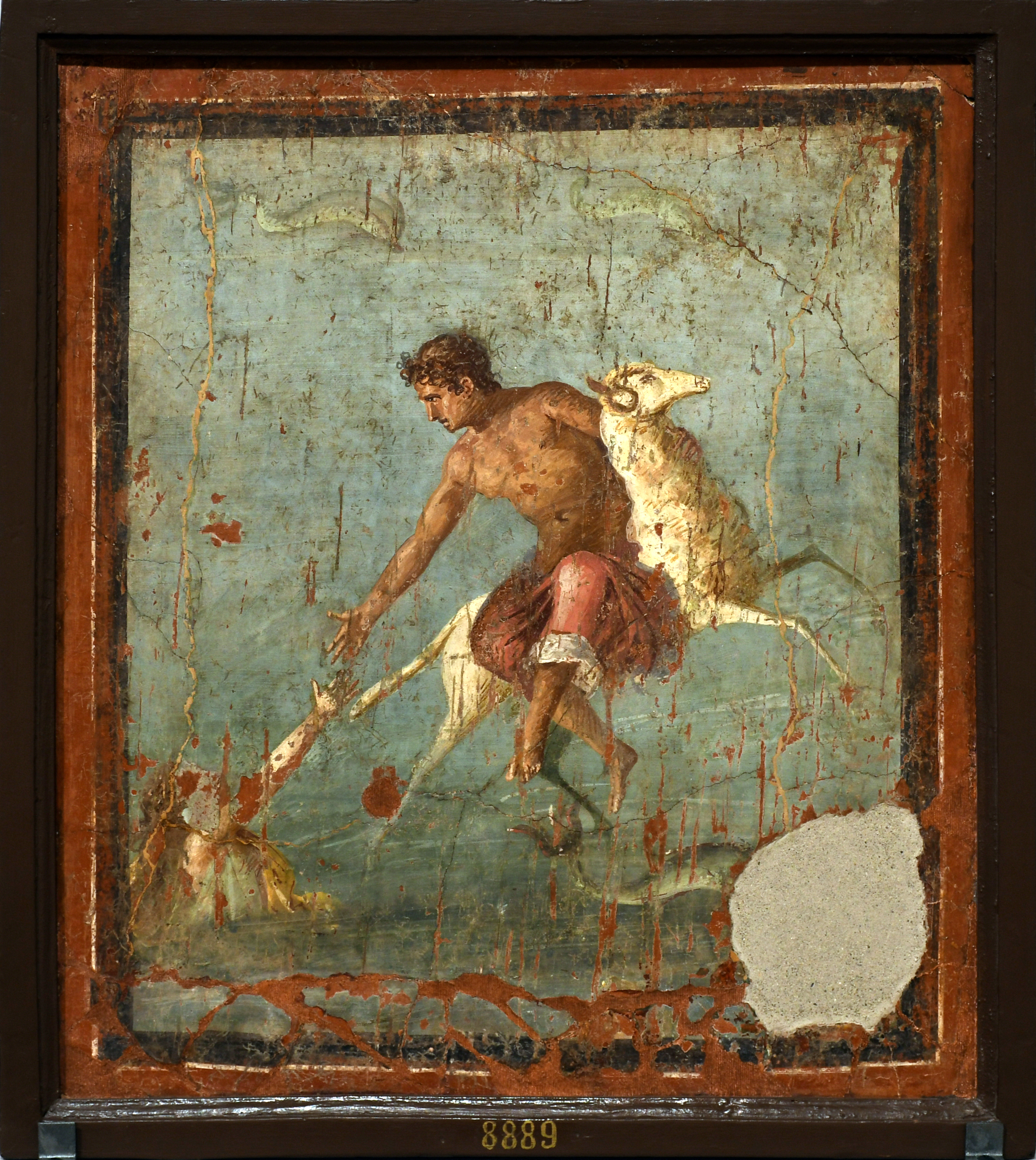
- Helle's death on a fresco from Pompeii
- Other names: Athamantis
- Abode: Athamantis in Boeotia later Colchis

Genealogy
- Parents: Athamas and Nephele
- Siblings: Phrixus; Learches; Melicertes; Schoeneus; Leucon; Ptous
- Consort: Poseidon
- Offspring: Almops; Paeon

Helle (/ˈhɛli/; Ancient Greek: Ἕλλη, romanized: Héllē), sometimes also called Athamantis (Ancient Greek: Ἀθαμαντίς, "daughter of Athamas"), was a character in Greek mythology who figured prominently in the story of Jason and the Argonauts. Helle is known for giving her name to the strait of Hellespont ("sea of Helle"), into which she fell while crossing it on the back of a flying golden ram with her brother Phrixus—the same flying ram from which the Golden Fleece derived.

== Mythology ==
Phrixus—son of King Athamas of Boeotia and the nymph Nephele—along with his younger sister, Helle, were hated by their stepmother, Ino. Ino hatched a devious plot to get rid of the children, roasting all of the town's crop seeds so that they would not grow. The local farmers, frightened of famine, asked a nearby oracle for assistance. Ino bribed the men sent to the oracle, such that they would lie and tell the others that the oracle had required the sacrifice of Phrixus.

Yet, before he was killed, Phrixus and Helle were rescued by a flying golden ram sent by Nephele, their natural mother. For reasons unknown, Helle fell off the ram into the Hellespont (which was subsequently named after her); there she either drowned, or was rescued by Poseidon and turned into a sea-goddess. Phrixus, however, survived all the way to Colchis (now a region on the coast of modern Georgia). There, King Aeetes took him in and treated him kindly, giving Phrixus his daughter Chalciope in marriage. In gratitude, Phrixus gave the king the Golden Fleece of the ram, which Aeetes placed in a consecrated grove, under the care of a sleepless dragon.

With the Greek god Poseidon, Helle was the mother of the giant Almops and Paeon (called Edonus in some accounts).
