= Laophoon =

In Greek mythology, Laophoon (/ˈlaʊfuːn/; Ancient Greek: Λαοφόων, romanized: Laophóon) is mentioned in Quintus Smyrnaeus' Posthomerica, his epic poem, telling the story of the Trojan War, from the death of Hector to the fall of Troy. He is a Paeonian warrior, the son of Paeon and Cleomede and the companion of Asteropaios, fighting for the Trojan side. He was killed by Meriones in an Argive counterattack after the killing of Machaon.
