= Paeon (father of Agastrophus) =

Paeonian mentioned in Homers Iliad

Paeon or Paion (Ancient Greek: Παίων, gen.: Παίονος) in Greek mythology was a Paionian mentioned in the Iliad of Homer as the father of the warrior Agastrophus, slain by Diomedes, while fighting on the side of Troy in the Trojan War. He is presumably the same as the Paeon mentioned in Quintus Smyrnaeus' Posthomerica as the father by Cleomede of Laophoon, a companion of Asteropaios slain by Meriones.
