= Paean (god) =

Greek deity

In Greek mythology, Paean (Ancient Greek: Παιάν), Paeëon or Paieon (Παιήων), or Paeon or Paion (Παιών, 'physician, healer'), was a minor god, a divine physician of the gods, and an epithet shared by Apollo, Asclepius and Helios.

== Name and etymology ==
The name Paeon (Παιών, Παιάων) is commonly derived from the ritual cry iē paiṓn (ἰὴ παιών) or iō paián (ἰὼ παιάν), understood as the opening invocation of a song. The underlying form is reconstructed as *paiá-(w)ōn (*παιά-(ϝ)ων), interpreted as meaning "who heals illness through magic".

The theonym is already attested in Mycenaean Greek as pa-ja-wo-ne (Paiāwonei, 𐀞𐀊𐀺𐀚), an alternative name of Apollo.

== Homer and Hesiod ==
A god of healing named Παιήων is mentioned twice in the Iliad. In book 5, the Olympian god of war Ares is wounded by mortal hero Diomedes, who is assisted by Athena. Ares is taken up to Olympus in a hurry, where Paeon applies medicine (Ancient Greek: φάρμακα, phármăkă) that produces an instant relief. Hades too had a similar medical treatment by Paeon when he was shot with an arrow by Heracles. In the Odyssey, Homer says of Egypt, "[T]here the earth, the giver of grain, bears greatest store of drugs, many that are healing when mixed, and many that are baneful; there every man is a physician, wise above human kind; for they are of the race of Paeeon."

Hesiod identifies Paean as an individual deity: "Unless Phoebus Apollo should save him from death, or Paean himself who knows the remedies for all things."

In time, Paeon (more usually spelled Paean) became an epithet of Apollo, in his capacity as a god capable of bringing disease and therefore propitiated as a god of healing. Later, Paeon becomes an epithet of Asclepius, the healer-god. Later, perhaps due to his identification with Apollo, Helios was also invoked as "Paion."
