= Edonus =

Son of Ares in Greek mythology

In Greek mythology, Edonus (Ancient Greek: Ἠδωνός, romanized: Ēdōnós) was the ancestor of the Edonians in Thrace and Thracian Macedonia. He was the son of Ares (god of war) and Calliope (muse of epic poetry). The names Edonus, Edonian, Edonic is therefore used also in the sense of "Thracian", and as Thrace was one of the principal seats of the worship of Dionysus, it further signifies "Dionysiac" or "Bacchantic".
