= Destiny (video game series) =

Video game series by Bungie

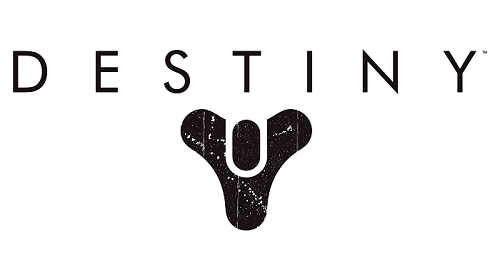
- Genre: First-person shooter
- Developers: Bungie (main); NetEase (mobile)
- Publishers: Activision (2014–2019); Bungie (2019–present); NetEase (mobile; 2025–present)
- Platforms: Android; Google Stadia; iOS; PlayStation 3; PlayStation 4; PlayStation 5; Windows; Xbox 360; Xbox One; Xbox Series X/S
- First release: Destiny; September 9, 2014
- Latest release: Destiny 2: Monument of Triumph; June 9, 2026

Destiny is an online-only multiplayer first-person shooter video game series developed by Bungie and previously published by Activision. The series began in 2014, and following Bungie's split from Activision in 2019, the main series became self-published by Bungie. Destiny marked Bungie's first new console franchise since the Halo series. Set in a "mythic science fiction" world, the series features a multiplayer "shared-world" environment with elements of role-playing games. Activities are divided among player versus environment (PvE) and player versus player (PvP) game types. In addition to normal story missions, PvE features three-player "strikes" and dungeons and six-player raids. A free roam patrol mode is also available for each destination which feature public events. PvP features objective-based modes, as well as traditional deathmatch game modes.

Players take on the role of a Guardian, protectors of Earth's last safe city as they wield a power called Light, granted by a celestial being called the Traveler, to protect the City from different alien races. Guardians journey to different planets to investigate and destroy the alien threats before humanity is completely wiped out, while also engaging in an intergalactic war against the Traveler's ancient enemy, the Darkness—Guardians also later learn to control and use its power.

The first game in the series was Destiny, which released on September 9, 2014, for the PlayStation 3, PlayStation 4, Xbox 360, and Xbox One. Over the course of its three-year lifecycle, four expansion packs were released. A sequel, Destiny 2, released in September 2017 for the PlayStation 4 and Xbox One, followed by a Microsoft Windows version the following month. It was later released on Google Stadia, PlayStation 5, and the Xbox Series X/S platforms. Destiny 2 had 10 expansion packs; the eighth, The Final Shape, concluded the first saga of the franchise called the "Light and Darkness" saga, while the ninth, The Edge of Fate, was originally intended to begin a new saga called the "Fate" saga, but these plans were scrapped after Bungie announced it was ending support for the game following its final update in June 2026; the game's 10th expansion, Renegades would in turn be the final expansion for the game. Additionally, the second year of the game's lifecycle introduced seasonal content—extra downloadable content released periodically throughout the year between each major expansion. Year 7 of the game replaced the seasons with three larger episodes, while Year 8 instead shifted to two large seasons that lasted several months, with each beginning with a medium-sized expansion and then receiving a "major update" midway through the season. The final update for the game was Monument of Triumph in June 2026, and although Bungie ended support for Destiny 2 following this major update, the game remains online and playable just like the original Destiny. In September 2026, however, Bungie revealed its plans to re-add all previously removed content to lay the foundation to continue the series.

In October 2019, the base game of Destiny 2 was re-released as a free-to-play title called Destiny 2: New Light, becoming a live service game, with only the expansions and seasonal passes requiring purchasing. The series expanded into the mobile market with a free-to-play live service mobile game entitled Destiny: Rising. It was developed and published by NetEase, with licensing from Bungie, and was released on August 28, 2025, for Android and iOS devices. Its story is set in an alternate timeline many years before the original game.

== Setting ==
Bungie described the setting of Destiny as a "mythic science-fiction" world. The setting, about 700 years in the future from present day, follows a prosperous period of exploration, peace, and technological advancement known as the Golden Age. In a universe where humans have spread out and colonized planets in the Solar System, an event known as "the Collapse" saw the mysterious dissolution of these colonies, the end of the Golden Age, and mankind teetering on the brink of extinction. The only known survivors of the Collapse are those living on Earth, who were saved by "the Traveler", a white, spherical celestial body whose appearance centuries before had enabled humans to reach the stars. The Collapse was caused by a mysterious force called the Darkness, wielded by a malevolent being called the Witness, an ancient enemy of the Traveler that plagues the galaxy. The Traveler now hovers above the last safe city on Earth, simply called The Last City, which is surrounded by a massive Wall, and its presence allows the Guardians — the defenders of the City — the ability to wield an unknown power, only referred to as "Light". The player takes on the role of a Guardian, and is tasked with reviving the Traveler while investigating and destroying alien threats before humanity is completely wiped out.

Upon mankind's first attempt to repopulate and reconstruct after the Collapse, it is discovered that hostile alien races have occupied mankind's former colonies and civilizations, and are now encroaching upon the City. Throughout the series, players have to combat aggressive aliens who have occupied the Solar System. Just like the Light for the Guardians, the Darkness lends powers to these alien threats, though Guardians have soon begun to wield the powers of Darkness themselves along with the Light. The powers of Light and Darkness are discovered to be forms of paracausal energy that gives their wielders the ability to bend the laws of reality to their own will, with the Light being tied to the physical world, and the Darkness being tied to thought and consciousness.

Both games use settings on various planets, moons, and other features within the Solar System as the Guardians fight to defend the remnants of the Golden Age. Destiny featured maps across Earth's Russian Cosmodrome (and an area outside it called the Plaguelands), its Moon, Venus, and Mars, and also included player-versus-player maps set on Mars' moon Phobos and the planet Mercury. Destiny 2, prior to the Beyond Light expansion, included Earth's European Dead Zone (EDZ), its Moon, Mercury, Mars, the centaur Nessus, Jupiter's moon Io, and Saturn's moon Titan, as well as the Tangled Shore and Dreaming City, areas situated along the Reef, located in the System's asteroid belt. There was also a social space in the EDZ called The Farm. With Beyond Light, Bungie opted to create a Destiny Content Vault (DCV), placing Mercury, Mars, Io, Titan, and The Farm content within it to start, as a means to better manage the game's future expansions. Bungie planned to revise vaulted content as the series progressed to re-introduce these into the game. Beyond Light also reintroduced Earth's Cosmodrome from Destiny as well as a new location, Jupiter's moon Europa, and a new social space called the H.E.L.M. (Hub for Emergency Maneuvers and Logistics). Another social space, Xûr's Treasure Hoard, located in an unknown realm of the Nine called Eternity, was added in Season 15 as part of the Bungie 30th Anniversary Pack. The Witch Queen added a fourth social space, the Enclave on Mars, as well as a new location, Savathûn's Throne World, within the Ascendant Realm above Mars. Upon release of The Witch Queen, the Tangled Shore was removed and placed in the DCV, but Bungie stated that following this, expansion content would no longer be vaulted, but seasonal content would still be removed upon release of each major expansion with some exceptions.

Lightfall added the secret technologically advanced city called Neomuna on Neptune. Simultaneously, The Farm social space returned briefly in Season 20, Season of Defiance. A fifth social space, the Hall of Champions, was added in Season 23 as part of Into the Light, but was removed upon the release of The Final Shape. The Final Shape added a new location, the Pale Heart, located within the Traveler, with areas influenced by previous destinations explored throughout the history of the franchise—this was also the first patrol destination that could be explored solo unless the player had a pre-made fireteam. The Edge of Fate added a new location, Kepler, a planetoid affected by a singularity located within the Oort cloud at the edge of the Solar System and is home to the mysterious Aionian race and the Fallen House of Exile. Renegades added a new social space on Mars, the Tharsis Cantina, home to various galactic crime syndicates and is inspired by Mos Eisley Cantina from Star Wars. It also added new missions on the destinations of Europa, Mars, and Venus, but in areas outside of the Vanguard's patrol called the Lawless Frontier.

Other destinations that have been featured in the games include the Dreadnaught, the massive flagship of Oryx, The Taken King, situated in the rings of Saturn in the original Destiny, and the Leviathan, the flagship of the exiled Cabal Emperor, Calus, in Destiny 2. The Leviathan was originally only the location of Destiny 2's original three raids and located in Nessus' orbit, but was removed upon Beyond Light's release; however, a derelict version in the Moon's orbit became a patrol destination in Season 17, Season of the Haunted, although it was removed upon the release of Lightfall. During Episode: Revenant, the Last City's market district and apartments were added as a social space and hub for the episodic content.

=== Characters ===
The default appearance of the player's Ghost, an artificial intelligence that accompanies and resurrects the Guardian. Players can alter its appearance using collectible Ghost shells.

The expansive universe of Destiny features numerous recurring non-player characters (NPCs) to assist the player. Several provide the player with quests while others are vendors to buy new gear using the in-game currency of glimmer and/or other resources. Most of these characters are human or of two subspecies: the Awoken, descendants of a human colony ship that had encountered a phenomenon in deep space that caused them to become more enlightened to paracausal forces while giving them blue-gray skin and other elf-like features, and Exo, robotic shells housing human consciousness developed by the Clovis Bray Corporation as to try to give humans immortality but require their memories to be occasionally wiped to prevent them from going insane.

While all Lightbearers of the Vanguard are recognized as Guardians, the player's character is unnamed and is simply referred to as "Guardian" or "the Guardian" by the NPCs. In the original Destiny, the character was voiced by one of six people, depending on which species and gender the player selected when creating their character: Matthew Mercer and Susan Eisenberg voiced the male and female Human guardians, Crispin Freeman and Grey Griffin voiced the male and female Awoken Guardians, while Peter Jessop and Cree Summer voiced the male and female Exo Guardians. In Destiny 2 beginning with Beyond Light, Peter Jessop now voices all male player Guardians while Susan Eisenberg voices all female ones.

Guardians are accompanied by a Ghost, a robot artificial intelligence. Just like how the player's character is simply referred to as the Guardian, the player's Ghost is simply referred to as Ghost without a own unique name, whereas other characters in the game have names for their respective Ghosts, which also have their own unique voices. Ghost's resurrection of the player as part of the opening sequence of the original Destiny is an act that creates the player-controlled Guardian and establishes the series' treatment of death, identity and immortality. Ghost is the principal intermediary between the player and the universe of Destiny and accompanies the player between in-game locations. Ghost effectively serves as the voice of the series' game experience by providing advice, historical information, and commentary, as well as tactical assistance by resurrecting the player character whenever they die. Ghost was originally voiced by Peter Dinklage in the original Destiny, but due to his availability, veteran voice actor Nolan North replaced Dinklage with the release of The Taken King expansion, and re-recorded all of Dinklage's lines from the original release.

The Guardians are led by the Vanguard that oversees their activities. Among their leaders include the Speaker (voiced by Bill Nighy) who was the head of the Vanguard and who speaks for the Traveler but was killed during the Red War in Destiny 2; Titan Vanguard Commander Zavala (initially voiced by Lance Reddick, then Keith David after Reddick's death in 2023), an Awoken who oversees most of the Vanguard's military operations; the Warlock Vanguard Ikora Rey (initially voiced by Gina Torres, then Mara Junot), a human who instructs the Hidden, the Vanguard's network of scouts and spies to track enemy movements; and the late Hunter Vanguard Cayde-6 (voiced by Nathan Fillion, then later Nolan North), who was a happy-go-lucky Exo and sharpshooter that assisted across various Vanguard functions; Cayde-6 was killed during the Destiny 2: Forsaken story content, his death having a lingering effect on the other characters, but returned in spirit form in Destiny 2: The Final Shape. Other key members of the Vanguard include Lord Shaxx (voiced by Lennie James), who oversees the Crucible activities, Saint-14 (voiced by Brian T. Delaney), who is a fabled Titan of the past and rescued from death through time travel that manages the Trials of Osiris matches, and Iron Lord Saladin Forge (voiced by Keith Ferguson), who had helped to end the conflict necessary to make the Last City a possibility and oversees the Iron Banner Crucible event. The Vanguard had also governed the Last City in the Consensus alongside three factions of citizens: the Future War Cult led by Lakshmi-2 (voiced by Shohreh Aghdashloo), which had used Vex technology to see constant conflict in the Last City's future and thus maintained preparedness for this, Dead Orbit led by Arach Jalaal (voiced by Peter Stormare), which believed that humanity must abandon the System and colonize planets outside it, and New Monarchy led by Executor Hideo (voiced by James Remar), which sought to replace the current democratic leadership of the Vanguard with a single powerful ruler—all of these factions were disbanded following the death of Lakshmi-2 at the end of Season 14, Season of the Splicer.

Among other major recurring allied characters include former Warlock Vanguard Osiris (voiced by Oded Fehr), who had been exiled after he became obsessed in studying the Vex but has since returned although he lost his power of Light after his Ghost, Sagira (voiced by Morena Baccarin), was destroyed and has since learned the Darkness power of Strand; Eris Morn (voiced by Morla Gorrondona), a former Hunter that has studied the Hive and the threat of Darkness; Ana Bray (initially voiced by Jamie Chung, then Erika Ishii), the granddaughter of Braytech's founder Clovis Bray I, and helped to create the automated system defense Warmind Rasputin; Asher Mir (voiced by Darryl Kurylo), a scientist who had been tested on and partially converted to Vex and was keen on studying how to reverse his conditions; Deputy Commander Sloane (voiced by Cissy Jones), a Titan who served under Zavala and took to monitoring activities on Titan once it was re-secured; Shaw Han (voiced by Cory Yee), a Hunter who oversees operations within Earth's Cosmodrome and a guide for New Lights (newly resurrected Guardians); and Crow (voiced by Brandon O'Neill), a Guardian who was formerly the Awoken Prince Uldren Sov—Asher Mir and Commander Sloane were seemingly killed following the events of Season of Arrivals, although Sloane returned, albeit part Taken, in Season of the Deep. The Vanguard is also aided by non-Guardian humans or allies, including: Amanda Holliday (voiced by Courtenay Taylor), who ran flights and transit operations for missions but was killed in Season of Defiance; Devrim Kay (voiced by Gideon Emery), a former Last City militia who maintains watch over the EDZ; Brother Vance (voiced by Bob O'Donnell), a devoted disciple of Osiris that oversaw the Lighthouse on Mercury—he entered the Infinite Forest on Mercury upon the conclusion of Season of Arrivals with his fate unknown; Failsafe (voiced by Joy Osmanski), an artificial intelligence with a split personality from the starship Exodus Black that had crashed centuries before on Nessus; Petra Venj (voiced by April Stewart), the Awoken Last City ambassador of Queen Mara Sov of the Reef and who monitors activities in the Dreaming City, and Mara Sov herself (voiced by Kristen Potter), who is indifferent to the Vanguard but seeks to eliminate the threat of the Witness and lends her powers to the Guardian to traverse the Ascendant Realm and the Awoken ley line network.

Further, the Guardians are aided by the Drifter (voiced by Todd Haberkorn), who oversees the Gambit activities; Banshee-44 (voiced by John DiMaggio), the Tower's gunsmith; Ada-1 (voiced by Britt Baron), the curator of the Black Armory weapon foundry who handles armor transmogrification for players; Eva Levante (voiced by Nika Futterman), originally the Guardian outfitter but now the Tower's seasonal vendor; Tess Everis (voiced by Claudia Black), the vendor for the Eververse microtransaction store; the Exo Stranger (initially voiced by Lauren Cohan, then Moira Quirk), also known as Elisabeth "Elsie" Bray, who is the sister of Ana Bray who first helped the Guardian destroy the Black Heart in the Black Garden and now helps Guardians learn the power of Stasis on Europa; Xûr (voiced by Fred Tatasciore), a strange vendor of exotic wares who speaks for the Nine, dark matter beings trapped in the System's gravity well for eons and have watched humanity developed and oversees the Dares of Eternity activity; the former Emissary of the Nine (also voiced by Moira Quirk), formerly an Awoken Titan named Orin, who also spoke for the Nine and served as their puppet and once presided over the Trials of the Nine event before regaining her own will and serving as a guide on Kepler; Fynch (voiced by Ian James Corlett), a Ghost who regrets joining the Hive and guides the Guardian in Savathûn's Throne World; Nimbus (voiced by Marin Miller), who is one of the Cloud Striders, the cybernetically-enhanced defenders of Neomuna, alongside their mentor Rohan (voiced by Dave Fennoy) and who guides the Guardian on Neptune but was killed during the events of Lightfall; Micah-10 (voiced by Pooya Mohseni), an Exo Hunter who helps find and save unpartnered Ghosts and assists the Guardian in the Pale Heart; Lodi (voiced by Brian Villalobos), a 21st-century human who was brought to the Guardian's time period by the Nine and guides the Guardian on Kepler, becoming the Nine's new Emissary but still maintaining his own will; Aunor Mahal (voiced by Dawn M. Bennett), a human Warlock of the Praxic Order who once opposed the Drifter's presence in the Tower and helps the guide the Guardian on Tharsis Cantina and in their outlaw bounty work on Mars, Europa and Venus; and Blue (voiced by Stephanie Kerbis), who is the Drifter's Ghost and also aids the Guardian in their outlaw bounty work.

=== Alien races ===
Multiple alien races have been introduced in the series. Five were originally introduced with Destiny. A sixth race, the Scorn, was introduced within Destiny 2: Forsaken, a seventh, Nightmares, were introduced within Destiny 2: Shadowkeep, and then an eighth, the Dread, were fully introduced in Destiny 2: The Final Shape, although a faction of Dread, Tormentors, were first introduced in the prior expansion, Destiny 2: Lightfall.

- The Fallen, also known as the Eliksni, are an insectoid race of nomadic pirates who scavenge ruined settlements on Earth, Earth's Moon, and Venus for resources. The Fallen are split among several tribal-like Houses, each with its own leader known as a Kell. Long before the Traveler arrived in the System, it had visited the Fallen's home world of Riis and similarly gave rise to a golden age, where they worshipped it as their "Great Machine". In the midst of this age, the Traveler suddenly left them, and their society fell apart as Houses turned against each other. The survivors abandoned the planet to seek out the Traveler, following it to Earth and scavenging whatever technology they could along the way. Rise of Iron added a faction of Fallen called the Devil Splicers, which are Fallen who have been modified by a Golden Age nanotechnology called SIVA. They are found on Earth in a zone outside of the Wall called the Plaguelands. During the course of events in Destiny 2, some of the Fallen Houses find that alliance with the Vanguard would become beneficial, while other Houses remain fully hostile to the Vanguard, such as Eramis, Kell of Darkness (voiced by Salli Saffioti) and House Salvation on Europa, which have acquired the use of the Darkness power of Stasis. Among those that have allied with the Vanguard include Variks (voiced by Dee Bradley Baker), the former Warden of the Prison of Elders; Mithrax (voiced by Ray Chase), the Kell of House Light who also has learned how to master hacking into the Vex Network; Eido (voiced by Maya Aoki Tuttle), Mithrax's daughter and the scribe of House Light; and Spider (voiced by Robin Atkin Downes), a black market trader operating from the Tangled Shore, and later, secretly in the Eliksni Quarter in the Last City, and then the Tharsis Outpost on Mars.
- The Hive are a macabre race of ancient aliens who have created massive underground settlements beneath Earth and its Moon's surfaces, as well as on Saturn's moon Titan. The Hive originated from a planet called Fundament that had an inescapable gravity well, and the people that lived there, the Krill, eked out a living. One of the rulers, the Osmium King, was killed in a coup, and his three daughters, Aurash, Sathona, and Xi Ro, aware their own lives were in danger, discovered that five Worm Gods, disciples of the Darkness, were trapped in the core of Fundament by the Traveler. The three sisters vowed to help feed the Worm Gods under the principles of the Sword Logic in exchange for immortality and power. The three became the first Hive: respectively, Oryx, the Taken King; Savathûn, the Witch Queen (voiced by Debra Wilson); and Xivu Arath, the God of War (voiced by Kimberly Brooks). The three converted the Krill to Hive servants and found the means to escape Fundament and chase down the Traveler and its allies by allying with the Darkness. As revealed in The Witch Queen expansion, the Krill were to have been visited by the Traveler and were about to be granted a Golden Age, but the Witness (voiced by Brett Dalton), an extremely powerful being of Darkness, interceded to make Sathona distrust the Traveler and seek out the Worm Gods instead and turn to the Darkness, leading to the birth of the Hive. Even still, Savathûn eventually decided to abandon the Darkness and the Worm Gods by trying to get rid of her worm. Queen Mara Sov freed her from the worm but then also attacked her. Savathûn was fatally injured but managed to flee the scene and ended up dying in the Last City after speaking with the Traveler. She was then resurrected by a Ghost, Immaru, becoming a Lightbearer. Using a wellspring within her Throne World, Savathûn was also able to grant her Hive lieutenants the power of Light with their own Ghosts, making them her Lucent Brood. Eris Morn also briefly became a Hive god, the Hive God of Vengeance, to banish Xivu Arath from her own Throne World.
- The Vex are semi-organic androids who are attempting to seize control of Venus, Mars, and the Jovian moon Io by turning them into their machines, which they have already done to Mercury and later the centaur planet Nessus. Vex are actually millions of microscopic artificial organisms that are linked via a giant mind network and survive in an organic fluid called radiolaria; each individual Vex android hosts a number of these organisms in its core. Because of their massive processing power, the Vex are constantly running simulations of the past, present, and future to try to outmaneuver their enemies in their goal to convert the entire universe to Vex, and have mastered some elements of time travel. Alongside the Hive, a particular collective of the Vex from the Black Garden known as the Sol Divisive worship the Darkness and are allied with the Witness. A new Vex collective called the Nessian Schism appeared during the events of Episode: Echoes, which are controlled by Golden Age scientist Maya Sundaresh (voiced by Shohreh Agdashloo), who created the collective via the Echo of Command that was created after the Witness's defeat.
- The Cabal are a military-industrial empire of gigantic amphibians who continue to expand their galactic empire from their homeworld of Torobatl, comparable to the Roman Empire. Within Destiny, they have secured bases on Mars as scouting posts for a potential invasion of Earth. The Cabal become more central within the "Red War" plot of Destiny 2, as their leader, Dominus Ghaul (voiced by Neil Kaplan), sought to capture the Traveler and draw out the Light for himself and destroy the System, but ultimately was defeated and destroyed. Later, the System is visited by the former exiled Emperor Calus (voiced by Darin De Paul) aboard the Leviathan, who tries to seek a tenacious alliance with the Vanguard after seeing portents of upcoming threats by the Darkness. The Cabal's homeworld of Torobatl was eventually invaded by Xivu Arath and her Hive forces, with some of the Cabal falling under her control, forcing them to flee Torobatl and their current leader and Calus' daughter, Empress Caiatl (voiced by Courtenay Taylor), was forced to seek alliances to help with fighting their homeworld battles. While Caiatl and her loyal Cabal soldiers became allies of the Vanguard, other Cabal remained loyal to Calus and joined his Shadow Legion faction in Lightfall, being lent powers of the Darkness by the Witness. A new Cabal faction called the Barant Imperium (inspired by the Galactic Empire from Star Wars) had suddenly appeared as part of Renegades and is led by Dredgen Bael (voiced by Aleks Le) and Premier Lume (voice provider unknown), all influenced by VI of the Nine.
- The Taken, a race introduced in The Taken King, are ghostly-looking corrupted versions of regular enemies, who infest areas on every planet. Through his communion with the Witness, Oryx was granted the ability to create his Taken army by drawing foes into the Ascendant Realm, which granted them new paracausal powers but drained them of their individuality and compelled to serve the one that created them. Other major enemies, especially the Witness, have since been able to create their own armies of Taken forces. A new faction of Taken, called Dire Taken, appeared in Oryx's Dreadnaught during the events of Episode: Heresy, which were the result of them manifesting a new master from within the Ascendant Realm.
- The Scorn, a race introduced in Forsaken, are undead Fallen, reanimated through a substance called Dark Ether. The reanimation process leaves them loyal to the Scorn Barons, led by Fikrul, the Fanatic (voiced by Matthew Mercer). The Scorn Barons are from an exiled house of the Fallen who have occupied the Tangled Shore (located within the Solar System's asteroid belt) and the Dreaming City and seek revenge against the Fallen, the Awoken, and certain Guardians. As revealed in The Witch Queen expansion, the Scorn are now being controlled by the Witness through one of its Disciples, Rhulk (voiced by Andrew Morgado), and are engaging in a turf war against the Lucent Hive for supremacy in Savathûn's Throne World. Following Rhulk's defeat by the Guardians, the Scorn came under the control of the Witness itself, though it is revealed that Fikrul had in fact survived and has an army of Scorn loyal to him. Fikrul had resurfaced during Episode: Revenant, wielding the Echo of Riis that was created after the Witness's defeat, which he used to create a new breed of Scorn called Revenant Scorn from living Fallen.
- Nightmares, introduced in Shadowkeep, are formless entities conjured by the Darkness based on the memories of those who encounter them. Nightmares take the form of any being, depending on the type of trauma the memory has caused, and when taking a form, they are surrounded by a miasma of crimson reddish-black Darkness with radiating ghostly tendrils. The Nightmares were first discovered and accidentally released by Eris Morn in investigating the dormant Lunar Pyramid, which was originally the Pyramid ship of the Disciple Nezarec, Final God of Pain (voiced by Ben Pronsky). The Nightmares originally only appeared around the Scarlet Keep on Earth's Moon, as the Lunar Pyramid is located below the Keep, but the Nightmares began appearing within Lost Sectors on other destinations, and also Calus's Leviathan ship when he later created a link with the Lunar Pyramid. It is also later discovered that the Nightmares were created by Nezarec as a defense mechanism for his Pyramid ship.
- The Dread, a race that was introduced in The Final Shape, are the Witness's personal soldiers of Darkness that appear within the Pale Heart of the Traveler. They are beings from other species that were reshaped by the Witness using both Light and Darkness. These include Grims, flying bat-like units reshaped from the shattered minds of dissenting Precursors which shoot from midair and attack with a sonic scream; Husks, fast-moving enemies reshaped from Fallen that wield twin blades that unleash a Geist upon defeat; Attendants and Weavers, reshaped Psions that use Stasis and Strand powers; Subjugators, which are tall, bipedal, glaive-wielding beings similar to Rhulk that are split between Stasis-wielding Omens and Strand-wielding Harbingers; as well as Tormentors, which were first introduced in Lightfall and are massive bipedal beings similar to Nezarec.

Every race utilizes different tactics and weapons in combat. The Fallen possess cloaking and short-range teleportation technologies to increase their mobility. The Hive use superior numbers to overwhelm their opponents in close quarters while more elite units attack from a distance. The Vex utilize hard-light shields and teleport units of infantry into the battlefield en-masse. The Cabal rely on heavy armor, ballistic shields, and jump packs to combat players. The Taken, in addition to all the other races specialties, use high mobility and plenty of long-range attacks to out-maneuver the player. The Scorn, in addition to similarities to the Fallen, do not take cover and have the most aggressive artificial intelligence, with the ability from Dark Ether to move incorporeally a short distance to evade damage. Nightmares mimic the capabilities of whoever or whatever they are impersonating. Tormentors are slow moving but wield massive scythes and utilize paracausal suppression abilities. Attendants, Weavers, Omens, and Harbingers all wield Stasis and Strand powers against their opponents. Grims shoot their opponents from midair and can unleash a suppressing sonic scream. Husks unleash a Geist enemy that homes in on their opponents upon death. All of these races are hostile towards each other (except between Dread, Taken, House Salvation Fallen, Shadow Legion Cabal, Sol Divisive Vex, Hive, and Scorn, between Nightmares, and between Lucent Hive), as they can often be observed attacking one another in-game for territorial dominance.

In the original game, the majority of the lore, which details backstory on characters, weapons, the alien races, planets, etc., was found in Grimoire cards collected throughout the game but could only be accessed through Bungie's website and the Destiny companion app. In Destiny 2, lore can be read through dedicated lore books in an in-game menu, as well as through lore tabs on various gear found throughout the game. There are also various scannable items found on the different planets that contain lore-related information.

== Gameplay ==
The Destiny series is primarily a first-person shooter, with the player taking the role of a Guardian, a person granted powers of Light by the Traveler. The player chooses from one of three main character classes: Titans, who specialize in melee and defense, Hunters, who can dodge and use stealth to their advantage, and Warlocks, who harness the power into magic-like abilities. Each class can use the Light along with three separate elemental archetypes of Light power—Arc, Solar, and Void—along with further subclasses of each that affect certain aspects of those powers. A fourth elemental power, Stasis, was introduced with Destiny 2: Beyond Light, while a fifth elemental power, Strand, was introduced with Destiny 2: Lightfall. Both Stasis and Strand are powers of the Darkness. A sixth power, Prismatic, was introduced in Destiny 2: The Final Shape, which allows combinations of Light and Darkness abilities to be used in tandem. These powers give abilities such as grenades and defensive options, as well as a powerful Super ability which requires a long cooldown before it can be cast again. Along with these powers, the player's Guardian is supported by a Ghost, an artificial intelligence that accompanies the Guardian and imbued with limited power of the Traveler to resurrect the Guardian should they die in combat in most cases. Only in certain restricted areas, where the powers of Darkness overwhelm the Light, the Ghost cannot revive the player.

Content in Destiny includes both single-player, cooperative multiplayer, and competitive multiplayer modes. The games include a story mode where the player completes various missions, gaining rewards while progressing the lore within the game. Cooperative activities like strikes and seasonal events allow players to matchmake with friends or within their clan, or offer random matchmaking in game. More involved activities include dungeons and raids, typically requiring more coordination between members, and require players to group up before starting. Competitive modes include matches in the Crucible and, within Destiny 2, Gambit, a team-based multiplayer mode that combines elements of PvE and PvP. Nearly all activities are repeatable, allowing for players to continue to build experience and obtain rewards.

Both Destiny and Destiny 2 used expansions to add in new content to the game, including new weapons and armor, new story-driven missions, and new activities. Within Destiny 2, Bungie adopted a seasonal approach, with approximately one major expansion each year along with four seasons of additional content—Year 7 changed to an episodic approach with three large episodes released throughout the year after the expansion while Year 8 had two medium-sized expansions lasting about six months each with each expansion receiving one major update.

=== Weapons and loot ===
Weapons and armor form a major part of progression throughout the Destiny series. In the original Destiny, firearms were divided between Primary, Special and Heavy weapon slots: weapons such as hand cannons, auto rifles and pulse rifles were generally Primary weapons; shotguns, sniper rifles and fusion rifles occupied the Special slot; and rocket launchers and machine guns were Heavy weapons. Destiny 2 initially replaced this arrangement with Kinetic, Energy and Power slots, before Forsaken revised the system in 2018 by separating ammunition type from weapon slot and allowing weapons that use Primary and Special ammunition to appear in either the Kinetic or Energy slots. Weapons and armor are divided into rarity classes, with Exotic equipment possessing abilities unavailable on ordinary items; a player can normally equip only one Exotic weapon and one Exotic armor piece at a time. Equipment is awarded directly through activities or from engrams, while the recurring vendor Xûr sells a rotating selection of Exotic and Legendary equipment.

Random rewards were particularly influential in the original game's progression. Players repeatedly completed Nightfall strikes, raids and other activities in the hope of receiving particular weapons or armor, while Legendary weapons could drop with different combinations of perks. The Vault of Glass raid supplied armor needed to reach the original maximum character level as well as weapons unavailable elsewhere. Nathan Brown, writing for Edge, singled out the raid's Fatebringer hand cannon as an example of how a particular combination of perks could change how players approached combat. Failure to receive the necessary raid armor became associated with the community expression "Forever 29".

One weapon became particularly associated with both the appeal and the problems of the original loot system. Gjallarhorn, an Exotic rocket launcher introduced in the original Destiny, releases smaller homing explosives called Wolfpack Rounds after its main projectile detonates. Its high damage made it especially effective against bosses and other high-health enemies. The enigmatic non-player character vendor Xûr sold it during the second week after the game's release, before many players understood its usefulness or had accumulated enough currency to purchase it. Once its strength became widely known, obtaining the weapon generally depended on receiving it through random rewards, and Xûr did not sell it again for almost a year. Video game journalists recounted stories about players receiving their first Gjallarhorn as emblematic of early Destiny, in which lengthy periods of unsuccessful play could make a coveted random drop unusually memorable.

Gjallarhorn's scarcity also affected the game's cooperative community. Because the original Destiny lacked automatic matchmaking for its six-player raids, players relied on external services to assemble groups. For example, advertisements for the Crota's End raid frequently insisted that prospective participants have access to both a maximum-level character and Gjallarhorn. Matthew Byrs from Den of Geek observed that ownership of the weapon during this time period became a form of social gatekeeping that could exclude otherwise capable players from challenging activities. Bungie reduced the effectiveness of Wolfpack Rounds in 2015 and later prevented the original version from advancing alongside newer equipment. Gjallarhorn returned through a quest in the 2016 expansion Rise of Iron. The Verge described it on its return as Destiny's most iconic weapon, attributing its reputation to its distinctive appearance and exceptional effectiveness during the game's first year.

Gjallarhorn returned to Destiny 2 in 2021 as part of the Bungie 30th Anniversary Pack. Bungie's artists rebuilt its model, textures, visual effects and sound while retaining its original silhouette and Wolfpack Rounds. Its mechanics were altered in response to its earlier effect on group formation: the Pack Hunter ability gives Wolfpack Rounds to nearby players using ordinary rocket launchers, allowing a single Gjallarhorn user to improve the rest of a fireteam rather than encouraging every participant to equip one. Bungie and Nerf also produced an approximately life-size foam-dart version measuring more than 4 feet (1.2 m) long. Its reload mechanism and multi-projectile shells imitated the in-game weapon; Wired considered its approximately 15-pound (6.8 kg) weight better suited to display or cosplay than ordinary Nerf play.

Bungie subsequently gave players greater control over some equipment while retaining random loot as a central reward system. The Witch Queen introduced weapon crafting, allowing players to unlock weapon patterns and construct versions with selected perks. Game director Joe Blackburn said Bungie wanted players to retain and develop particular weapons over long periods rather than continually replacing them; crafting nevertheless remained dependent on patterns and materials obtained through ordinary activities and was limited to selected weapons. In 2025, The Edge of Fate again reorganized progression around tiered rewards and the Portal activity system. PC Gamer's Phil Savage observed that these changes reduced distinct activity-specific loot pools and favoured recently introduced equipment over weapons accumulated by longtime players.

== History ==
Prior to developing Destiny, Bungie had developed an early first-person shooter series with the Marathon Trilogy, released between 1994 and 1996. One facet that Bungie brought to this developing genre was the integration of lore-heavy story alongside the action gameplay; players could read logs and messages from various terminals scattered around the maps, which featured a story about humanity in conflict with alien races and rogue artificial intelligences. Another key part of Bungie's history was the first several games in the Halo series. Halo was used as a flagship title for the Xbox console by Microsoft, which had acquired Bungie as an internal studio in 2000 for its development. Halo is also a first-person shooter series and including both a mythos-heavy single-player story mode as well as online multiplayer modes. Bungie split off from Microsoft in 2007, and supported the next few games in the Halo series through 2010 before Microsoft transitioned the development to 343 Industries.

During this period of transition, Bungie began laying the groundwork for their next game which would become Destiny. According to Bungie's Chief Operating Officer Pete Parsons, Bungie knew they could create works that would enter the popular culture as they had with Halo, but they wanted to go for something more epic with this game: "We like to tell big stories and we want people to put the Destiny universe on the same shelf they put Lord of the Rings, Harry Potter or Star Wars; we've already seen them do that with Halo." Bungie had planned for Destiny to be the first "shared-world shooter", with players often engaging with other players on the same service in cooperative or competitive activities in an always-online fashion. Destiny was formally revealed in 2013, alongside news that Activision would help Bungie to publish the title. Though the game was released in 2014, it did had numerous issues in the years prior; as documented by Jason Schreier from Kotaku, numerous changes were made in the game's story and approach around 2013, including dumping much of the story written to that point. This resulted in the initial release of Destiny to be lack-luster due to what appeared to be unfinished and inconsistent parts of the game's story. Bungie worked to improve the game through its expansions in the following years.

Alongside work on expansions, Bungie also began planning towards Destiny's sequel shortly after the first game's release. Destiny 2 was released in 2017, and in addition to console platforms, was also released for Microsoft Windows through Activision's Battle.net distribution system. In 2018, Bungie announced they had amicably agreed with Activision to break the long-term publishing contract they had, and would proceed to distribute Destiny 2 on their own, transitioning the Windows version to Steam over several months. On January 31, 2022, Sony Interactive Entertainment announced its intent to acquire Bungie for $3.6 billion. While Bungie would become part of the PlayStation family of studios, it would remain an independent subsidiary under Sony in development and publishing and would not be part of PlayStation Studios. Instead, Sony's investment would help Bungie with hiring for developers to expand their work on the Destiny franchise and other planned games. Both companies stated that the deal would not affect platform availability or exclusivity for Destiny 2, but instead was geared towards media beyond video games that Bungie had been interested in pursuing for some time. Following this acquisition, and in part due to poor response to the Lightfall expansion, Bungie went through two major rounds of layoffs in 2023 and 2024. While there was rumor that these July 2024 layoffs impacted a potential Destiny 3, industry journalist Jason Schreier confirmed that there was not yet any Destiny 3 in the works. However, Schreier stated that based on others with Bungie, the company plans to back off the annual expansion model for smaller content releases similar to Into the Light, as well as to make the game more amenable for bringing on new players while refining content for the veteran ones.

Bungie announced on May 21, 2026, that the June 2026 update would be the final live service content update for Destiny 2. The decision to end Destiny 2 with this major update came as a result of Sony taking a US$765 million impairment loss on Bungie from its previous fiscal year, on part due to poor performance of Marathon, with Bungie also refocusing their efforts to other games. Despite ending active development, Bungie confirmed that Destiny 2 would remain online and playable. Bloomberg's Schreier reported that day that there was no internal Destiny-related project, with the studio to be focused on Marathon in the short term, and was planning on layoffs once the content update was released. In a studio update in September 2026, Bungie announced its plan to bring back content that had been previously vaulted to Destiny 2, including campaigns, destinations, and raids, considering this as a "first step to lay the foundation for how we reforge into new stories and games that you all deserve". There was no time table given as it will take time for the developer to rebuild all previously removed content.

== Games and expansion packs ==
Release timeline
2014	Destiny
2014	The Dark Below
2015	House of Wolves
2015	The Taken King
2016	Rise of Iron
2017	Destiny 2
2017	Curse of Osiris
2018	Warmind
2018	Forsaken
2019	Shadowkeep
2020	Beyond Light
2021
2022	The Witch Queen
2023	Lightfall
2024	The Final Shape
2025	The Edge of Fate
2025	Rising (mobile)
2025	Renegades

=== Destiny ===
Destiny released worldwide for the PlayStation 3, PlayStation 4, Xbox 360, and Xbox One on September 9, 2014. While the majority of the game served to set up the Destiny universe, the main conflict was with the Vex, wherein the Guardian entered into the Black Garden on Mars to destroy the Heart of the Black Garden, lifting the shroud of Darkness from the Traveler back on Earth. This was followed up by a raid, the "Vault of Glass", where a fireteam of Guardians entered the Vex construct to face Atheon, Time's Conflux, a central figure of the Vex Conflux network.

- Destiny: The Dark Below was the first expansion pack for the game. A minor expansion, it released on December 9, 2014. The story centers on the Hive race and their deity Crota, Son of Oryx, who had been referenced in the original game. The Hive are attempting to resurrect Crota. The story culminates with the raid, "Crota's End", where a fireteam of Guardians descend deep into the caverns of the Moon to eliminate the Hive prince.
- Destiny: House of Wolves was the second expansion pack. Another minor expansion, it released on May 19, 2015. The story centers on the Fallen race, as players attempt to thwart a campaign by Skolas, Kell of Kells, to unite the Fallen race under his rule. Instead of a raid, the expansion added a new three-player PvE cooperative mode called Prison of Elders. In the level 35 difficulty of the mode called "Skolas's Revenge", a fireteam of Guardians enter into Skolas's lockup, after capturing the Kell, to execute him for his crimes. House of Wolves also added a new competitive PvP mode called Trials of Osiris, a three-versus-three mode that uses the Elimination game type.
- Destiny: The Taken King was the third expansion and the first major expansion for the game. Released on September 15, 2015, it had the largest effect on the game, overhauling many of its features. It also introduced a new subclass for each class. The story revolves around Oryx, The Taken King, and his plot for revenge after the Guardians slew his son Crota in The Dark Below. The expansion added a new race of enemy called the Taken, Oryx's warriors that have been altered by the Darkness—the Taken are corrupted versions of the other races in the game. The expansion culminates in the raid, "King's Fall", where a fireteam of Guardians board Oryx's Dreadnaught ship to eliminate The Taken King.
- Destiny: Rise of Iron was the fourth and last major expansion of the original Destiny. It released on September 20, 2016, but only for the PlayStation 4 and Xbox One versions of the game; aside from updates to address software bugs, the PlayStation 3 and Xbox 360 clients stopped receiving content updates. The story revolves around the Fallen, as they have breached the Wall that surrounds Earth's last safe city and are utilizing the SIVA virus, a Golden Age nanotechnology characterized by self-replication and self-assembly. Lord Saladin, one of the two last known remaining Iron Lords, guides players to become a new generation of Iron Lords and wipe out SIVA. The expansion culminates in the raid, "Wrath of the Machine", where a fireteam of Guardians enter into the breached wall to eliminate Aksis, Archon Prime, and end the SIVA threat.

=== Destiny 2 ===
Destiny 2 released worldwide for the PlayStation 4 and Xbox One on September 6, 2017, followed by a Microsoft Windows version the following month. It was then released on Google Stadia in October 2019, and then the PlayStation 5 and Xbox Series X/S platforms in December 2020. Also on October 1, 2019, Destiny 2 was re-released as a free-to-play title called Destiny 2: New Light, becoming a live service game. The original story of Destiny 2's base game revolved around the Cabal race and their leader, Dominus Ghaul, in his attempt to legitimize himself as the Emperor of the Cabal, a conflict called The Red War. Ghaul manages to strip the Guardians of their Light. After regaining their power, the Guardians face Ghaul in a final showdown, which results in the Traveler awakening and completely destroying Ghaul. Afterwards, a large ship called the Leviathan enters into the Solar System above Nessus' orbit. The former Emperor, Calus, invites a fireteam of Guardians to board his ship ("Leviathan" raid) to complete a series of challenges. In November 2020, Destiny 2 went through a major overhaul and nearly half of the content from its first three years were removed from the game and placed into the Destiny Content Vault. This included Destiny 2's base campaign, The Red War. Replacing this is a campaign to introduce new players to the world of Destiny. New players are introduced to a new character named Shaw Han, who guides players on a quest through Earth's Russian Cosmodrome, battling Fallen and Hive, culminating in taking down a powerful Hive Wizard called Navôta, Eir Spawn.

- Destiny 2: Curse of Osiris was a small expansion, but the first for Destiny 2, released on December 5, 2017. The expansion focused on the legendary Warlock Osiris from the lore of the original Destiny. He has returned to reality from his time spent in the Infinite Forest on Mercury as he has seen a dark future where there is no Light or Darkness and the Vex reign supreme. The Guardian then helps Osiris to stop Panoptes, Infinite Mind, from preventing the dark future. Following this, Emperor Calus extends another invitation to travel to the Leviathan on Nessus, where a fireteam of Guardians venture deep into the Leviathan's core to eliminate Argos, Planetary Core, the Vex Mind which was responsible for the transformation of Nessus ("Leviathan: Eater of Worlds" raid lair). The contents of this expansion were also removed and placed into the Destiny Content Vault in November 2020.
- Destiny 2: Warmind was also a small expansion, and the second for Destiny 2, released on May 8, 2018. The expansion focused on the Warmind Rasputin from the original game. Assisting the Hunter Guardian Ana Bray, the Guardian helps Ana in stopping a Hive worm god called Xol, Will of the Thousands, from attacking the Bray Research facility and destroying Rasputin. Following Xol's defeat, the remnants of the Red Legion, led by Val Ca'uor, assault the Leviathan in an attempt to assassinate Emperor Calus, who once again calls upon Guardians to his aid to eliminate Val Ca'uor ("Leviathan: Spire of Stars" raid lair). The contents of this expansion were also removed and placed into the Destiny Content Vault in November 2020.
- Destiny 2: Forsaken was the third expansion, but the first major expansion for Destiny 2. It released on September 4, 2018, and had a major overhaul on the game. Additionally, an Annual Pass was available, which began the seasonal content model for Destiny 2. The first season was Season of the Outlaw, which was just an alternative name for Forsaken and its initial three months. The first seasonal content drop of the Annual Pass itself was Season of the Forge in December 2018, followed by Season of the Drifter in March 2019, and then Season of Opulence in June 2019. The story of Forsaken revolved around the player's Guardian seeking to avenge the death of Cayde-6 by the hands of Prince Uldren Sov. Uldren, corrupted by the Darkness, was in search of his lost sister, Queen Mara Sov, both of whom were thought to have died in The Taken King. Along their journey, players faced the Scorn, undead versions of the Fallen race that had been revived and morphed into a new race. The expansion culminated in the raid, "Last Wish", where a fireteam of Guardians set out to eliminate Riven of a Thousand Voices, a wish dragon called an Ahamkara who was responsible for corrupting Uldren. The expansion also introduced the franchise's first dungeon called "The Shattered Throne", a three-player endgame activity similar to a raid. In December 2021, Forsaken's campaign was made free-to-play before it was removed and entered into the Destiny Content Vault in February 2022; the Tangled Shore destination was also removed at this time. However, the Dreaming City destination remained, as did Forsaken's endgame content (raid and dungeon), which were repackaged as an SKU called the Forsaken Pack, which also grants access to Forsaken's exotic gear.
- Destiny 2: Shadowkeep was the next major expansion. A large expansion that released on October 1, 2019, it had four seasonal content offerings. The first, Season of the Undying, was available alongside the expansion's release. This was followed up by Season of Dawn in December 2019, then Season of the Worthy in March 2020, and finally Season of Arrivals in June 2020—unlike Forsaken, the first season (Season of the Undying) was its own content separate from the expansion, which continued with subsequent expansions. The story of Shadowkeep sees the return of Eris Morn, who had been absent since the events of The Red War. Eris seeks the help of the Guardian in defeating "Nightmares" that she released into the Solar System, which are manifestations of the Guardian's past. Players face off against their previous adversaries, which are being resurrected by the Darkness. Throughout the story, Eris and the Guardian work together to figure out the cause of this unleashed madness and do what they can to put a stop to it. The expansion culminates in the raid, "Garden of Salvation", where a fireteam of Guardians face off against the Vex, with a final fight against the Sanctified Mind, Sol Inherent; through this, they learn that the Darkness has been sending messages, which Eris dismisses as attempts of manipulation by the Darkness. Shadowkeep also added the dungeon, "Pit of Heresy", while another dungeon, "Prophecy", was added with Season of Arrivals.
- Destiny 2: Beyond Light was the fifth expansion released on November 10, 2020. Bungie described this expansion as the start of a new era in the franchise. It has had the largest effect on the game thus far, changing many aspects as well as removing nearly half of the game's content from the first three years of Destiny 2. It also had four seasonal content offerings. The first, Season of the Hunt, was available alongside the expansion's release. This was followed up by Season of the Chosen in February 2021, then Season of the Splicer in May 2021, and finally Season of the Lost in August 2021, which at the time was the longest season for the game, lasting six months due to the delay of The Witch Queen. In Beyond Light, the Guardian travels to Jupiter's icy moon Europa to confront the Fallen Kell Eramis, who plans to use the power of the Darkness to save her people and take revenge on the Traveler back on Earth, as she and many Fallen believe that the Traveler had abandoned them before the Golden Age of humanity. The player's Guardian also obtains this Darkness-based power as a subclass called Stasis, which features ice-based abilities. The expansion sees the return of the Exo Stranger from the original Destiny's campaign, as well as Variks from House of Wolves, both of which guides the Guardian on Europa. After stopping Eramis, the expansion culminates in the raid, "Deep Stone Crypt", where a fireteam of Guardians enter the fabled crypt to prevent the Fallen from using its technology, resulting in a showdown with Taniks, the Abomination. Due to the delay of The Witch Queen, a mid-season update for Season of the Lost was added called the Bungie 30th Anniversary Pack, which added a new dungeon called "Grasp of Avarice", as well as a free-to-play six-player PvE activity called "Dares of Eternity". A reprised raid from the original Destiny, "Vault of Glass", was also added in Season of the Splicer.
- Destiny 2: The Witch Queen was the sixth expansion released on February 22, 2022. It was originally planned for release in late 2021, but due to the impact of the COVID-19 pandemic, the expansion was delayed by three months. The expansion revolves around the sister of Oryx, Savathûn the titular Witch Queen. It had four seasons of content, the first of which, Season of the Risen, was made available alongside the expansion's release. It was followed up by Season of the Haunted in May 2022, then Season of Plunder in August 2022, and finally, Season of the Seraph in December 2022. Upon release, all of Year 4's seasonal content was removed, except for Season 13's Battlegrounds activity (which was added to the Vanguard Operations playlist), and the Forsaken campaign was also removed, along with the Tangled Shore destination. In The Witch Queen, the Guardian discovers that Savathûn is able to wield the power of Light and has used it to infuse her Hive warriors, known as the Lucent Brood, with powers similar to that of the Guardians. The Guardian travels to Savathûn's Throne World in the Ascendant Realm to investigate on how she stole the Light. The expansion also sees the debut of a brand new character, a Hive Ghost named Fynch, who guides the Guardian in Savathûn's Throne World. After defeating Savathûn, the expansion culminates in the raid, "Vow of the Disciple", where a fireteam of Guardians investigate a sunken Pyramid ship in the outskirts of the Throne World, where they face off against the Scorn and the Taken, controlled by Rhulk, Disciple of the Witness, who the Guardians face off against at the end of the raid; through Rhulk's defeat, the Guardians eliminate a major threat of the Witness, the leader of the Black Fleet who controls the Darkness and is responsible for the ascension of the Hive. Over the course of the year, two new dungeons were added, "Duality" in Season of the Haunted and "Spire of the Watcher" in Season of the Seraph, as well as a reprised raid from the original Destiny, "King's Fall", in Season of Plunder.
- Destiny 2: Lightfall was the seventh expansion released on February 28, 2023. It was originally planned for release in late 2022 but was pushed back due to The Witch Queen's delay as a result of the COVID-19 pandemic. It had four seasonal content offerings released throughout 2023. The first, Season of Defiance, was made available alongside the expansion's release. It was followed up by Season of the Deep in May 2023, Season of the Witch in August 2023, and Season of the Wish in November 2023, the latter becoming the longest traditional season in the game, lasting over six months due to the delay of The Final Shape. The expansion revolves around the Witness and its newest Disciple, Emperor Calus, as they assault the secret, technologically advanced human city of Neomuna on Neptune, enroute to destroy the Traveler in the Last City. In Lightfall, the player's Guardian travels to Neomuna to intercept the Witness and Emperor Calus and their army of Shadow Legion Cabal and Pyramid Tormentors and prevent their advance. The Guardian also discovers a brand new Darkness-based power as a subclass called Strand, which features psychic energy-based abilities that also allows them to traverse the Neomuna skyline. The expansion sees the introduction a brand new allied race called the Cloud Striders, the human defenders of Neomuna who have voluntarily undergone cybernetic augmentation at the cost of significantly reducing their lifespan. One such Cloud Strider, Nimbus, guides the Guardian as an NPC on Neomuna. After the Guardian defeats Calus, however, The Witness successfully uses a mysterious being called the Veil to open a portal to go inside the Traveler, leaving the Traveler in a dormant state. The expansion culminates in the raid, "Root of Nightmares", where a fireteam of Guardians enter The Witness's Pyramid ship to defeat Nezarec, Final God of Pain, who had been inadvertently revived by the Traveler when it attacked the Witness's Pyramid ship. Due to the delay of The Final Shape, a mid-season update for Season of the Wish was added called Into the Light, serving as a prologue to The Final Shape, which added a new three-player defensive horde mode. Over the course of the year, two new dungeons were added, "Ghosts of the Deep" in Season of the Deep and "Warlord's Ruin" in Season of the Wish, as well as a reprised raid from the original Destiny, "Crota's End", in Season of the Witch.
- Destiny 2: The Final Shape is the eighth expansion and was released on June 4, 2024. It was originally planned for release in February 2024, but was delayed due to layoffs at Bungie in October 2023, as well as Bungie wanting more time to deliver on their vision for the expansion. The Final Shape concluded the franchise's first saga called the "Light and Darkness Saga". It introduced a new seasonal model in place in which three, three-act episodes were released throughout the content year, which were respectively titled Episode: Echoes, Episode: Revenant, and Episode: Heresy—these were planned for release in March, July, and November, respectively, but due to The Final Shape's delay, they were pushed back, with Echoes releasing on June 11, then Revenant in October 204, and finally Heresy in February 2025. The expansion revolves around the Guardian and the Vanguard finally confronting the Witness in an otherworldly dimension inside the Traveler called the Pale Heart and preventing the titular Final Shape—the calcification and destruction of all life in the universe—from being brought forth by the Witness. In The Final Shape, the player's Guardian and the Vanguard enter the portal on the Traveler's surface to defeat the Witness in its monolith deep within the Pale Heart once and for all and end the war between Light and Darkness. The players take on the Witness in the "Salvation's Edge" raid, before completely defeating it in the game's only 12-player activity called Excision. Also over the course of the year, two new dungeons were added: "Vesper's Host" during Episode: Revenant and "Sundered Doctrine" during Episode: Heresy.
- Destiny 2: The Edge of Fate is the ninth expansion and was released on July 15, 2025. A medium-sized expansion, it was originally intended to begin the franchise's second saga called the "Fate Saga", theming around the origins of the universe and the Nine, but these plans were scrapped after Bungie announced it was ending support of Destiny 2 following the June 2026 update. This content year (Year 8) introduced a new seasonal model in which there were two large seasons for the year lasting several months that each began with a medium-sized expansion, and the seasons received a midpoint "major update". The Edge of Fate began Season: Reclamation, with its major update, Ash & Iron, releasing in September 2025. The expansion revolves around the Guardian traveling to a mysterious planetoid called Kepler within the Oort cloud at the edge of the Solar System, where it has been affected and influenced by the Nine. The Guardian must prevent a singularity from destroying the Sol System. The expansion added one new raid, "The Desert Perpetual".
- Destiny 2: Renegades is the 10th and final expansion, and the second of Year 8, and it was released on December 2, 2025. A medium-sized expansion, it began Season: Lawless for Year 8 with its major update, Monument of Triumph, releasing in June 2026; the latter was originally scheduled for March and to be titled Shadow & Order but was delayed. The expansion is themed around concepts from Star Wars with the Guardian teaming up with the Drifter to stop new enemy Dredgen Bael from using a super weapon to wipe out all lightbearers. The expansion added one new dungeon, "Equilibrium". Monument of Triumph was the final update for the game as Bungie ended support for Destiny 2 following its release but kept the game online and playable. However, in September 2026, Bungie revealed its plans to return to the game, but no time table was given.

=== Destiny: Rising ===
Destiny: Rising is a mobile game developed by NetEase with Bungie's support and released on August 28, 2025, for Android and iOS devices. It is a prequel to the original Destiny, but set in an alternate timeline after the events of the Collapse in the Dark Age. Players take on the role of Lightbearers with more ability customization than offered by the main games. The game supports both PvE and PvP content, including modes featured in the main games and new modes for mobile.

== Other media ==
In July 2018, an anthology book series focusing on supplementing the fictional universe of the video games, titled Destiny Grimoire Anthology, was announced.

In 2021, Bungie listed a job offer for an executive position to oversee the development of a media franchise set in the Destiny universe.
