= Destiny: The Taken King =

2015 video game

- Cover art featuring the three character classes wielding their new subclass abilities and a silhouette of Oryx
- Developer: Bungie
- Publisher: Activision
- Director: Luke Smith
- Writer: Clay Carmouche
- Composers: Michael Salvatori; C. Paul Johnson; Skye Lewin
- Series: Destiny
- Platforms: PlayStation 3; PlayStation 4; Xbox 360; Xbox One
- Release: WW: September 15, 2015
- Genres: Action role-playing, first-person shooter
- Mode: Multiplayer

Destiny: The Taken King is a major expansion for Bungie's first-person shooter, Destiny. Released on September 15, 2015, as the third expansion of Destiny, it revolves around Oryx, The Taken King and his plot for revenge after players slew his son Crota in Destiny's first downloadable content (DLC) pack, The Dark Below. Players must face the "Taken", Oryx's army of corrupted aliens forced to fight for him. The Taken King adds content across the game, including new missions, a Player versus Environment location, Player versus Player maps, player gear, weaponry, and a new raid. Upon the expansion's release, retailers also issued Destiny: The Taken King Legendary Edition which includes Destiny (base game), The Taken King, and the previous two expansions, The Dark Below and House of Wolves.

Two days after its release, Sony announced that the game broke the record for the most downloaded day-one game in PlayStation history, in terms of both total players and peak online concurrency. Its release coincided with patch version 2.0 for Destiny, which made fundamental changes to the core functionality for all players to mark the start of "Year Two" of its lifecycle, including a new quest system and revisions to the game's leveling system among others. Through the development of The Taken King, Bungie sought to address criticisms from players and critics; many changes to the game were direct responses to this.

The Taken King and its associated patch received positive critical reception, with reviewers citing the more coherent storyline of the content contained within, as well as other changes across Destiny as a whole that improved its overall systems and gameplay mechanics.

== Gameplay ==
In comparison to the previous two expansions of Destiny, The Taken King features a "full campaign", three new multiplayer "strike" missions, and seven new Crucible maps. Three new Crucible modes were also added, "Rift"—a capture the flag-like mode, "Mayhem"—which greatly lowers cooldown times for abilities, and "Zone Control"—a modified version of Control where points are awarded only for capturing and maintaining control of zones.

The expansion introduces a new faction of enemies, the titular Taken—the slaves of Oryx. Taken enemies are variations of the existing enemies seen in other parts of the game as a whole, but have a darker, undead-like appearance, and have new abilities and attacks. The Dreadnaught, a Hive ship situated within the rings of Saturn, serves as a new playable environment in The Taken King; Bungie described the location as being "an inscrutable loot-filled fortress", emphasizing secret treasures and bosses contained within. At the Dreadnaught's Court of Oryx, players can use special runes to summon enemies for public battles; defeating its enemies requires the use of distinct strategies. All participants in Court of Oryx battles receive rewards, but the player who initiated the battle will receive higher-valued rewards. The runes correspond to three difficulty levels, ranging from easier fights to "just below Nightfall". A new raid mission, "King's Fall", was opened on September 18, 2015 at its lower difficulty; the hard version became available on October 23, 2015. Beginning December 1, 2015, the raid also contains a weekly bonus challenge, in which defeating one of the bosses in a specific, specified manner will yield additional rewards.

Each of the three character classes feature a new, third sub-class. Each focuses on an element that had not been represented among each class's preexisting sub-classes, and features a new super ability. The Hunter class's new Void-based sub-class "Nightstalker" includes a bow-like super known as the "Shadowshot" that tethers enemies together, limiting movement and preventing enemies from using abilities for a short time. The Titan's "Sunbreaker" sub-class features a solar-based super, the "Hammer of Sol", creating a flaming hammer that can be thrown at enemies, or used for close-quarters combat. The Warlock's new sub-class, the arc-based "Stormcaller" includes the super "Stormtrance", which produces lightning bolts that chains between enemies.

The new "Legendary Mark" currency replaces Vanguard and Crucible marks, and are shared across all of a user's characters. Legendary Marks can be used to re-purchase exotic items that had already been found by a user, along with upgraded versions of some pre-existing exotics, through the new "Exotic Blueprints" system (although this also requires Exotic shards), and engrams that are guaranteed to contain a legendary weapon. Upgrades for Year Two items no longer increase their statistics; instead, Legendary gear can be "infused" with higher-levelled Year 2 items of the same type to improve their stats.

=== Patch changes ===
Major changes were made to the core gameplay of Destiny as part of the version 2.0 patch released on September 8, 2015; some of these changes are available to all users, regardless of whether they own The Taken King. The voice of the player's Ghost, Peter Dinklage, was replaced by Nolan North; all of Dinklage's existing Ghost dialogue from Year One was retroactively replaced with new versions recorded by North. A new "Progress" tab was added to the user menu, which displays character progression through storylines—which have been reworked to utilize a new "Quest" system, as well as currently active bounties and faction reputation. Up to four active bounties and quests can be pinned to be displayed on the bottom-right of the screen when Nav Mode is used. Players can turn in quests and bounties at any time, and up to 32 quests and 16 bounties can be stored in their inventory. All existing storylines were adapted to work under this new system. New "Collections" interfaces allow players to track the exotic items, emblems, shaders, emotes, sparrows, and ships that they have found, and view clues for obtaining those they do not currently possess.

Prior to The Taken King, experience points were only used to reach up to character level 20, but additional levels (up to 34 with the previous DLC, House of Wolves) could be reached by equipping stronger armor containing "Light" attributes. This was criticized because it limited the customization options of the players. These "light levels" have been removed, with experience-based leveling used across the entire game, up to level 40 for owners of The Taken King. A separate "Light" statistic is determined by averaging the strength and power of the character's equipped gear. Newer weapons and some Year One exotics are capable of higher damage than existing Year One weapons; damage values on all existing weapons were scaled down numerically from 365 to 170, with higher values representing weapons that are more powerful than those from Year One. The highest obtainable light level was 320; the April Update increased it to 335. but then later it was increased to 400.

Class items, newly introduced Ghost shells for all players, and Artifacts are able to provide additional boosts to a player's abilities. The process of earning reputation from other factions has changed; previously, players were required to equip a specific item which would exclusively divert all reputation gains to the corresponding faction. Instead, players now purchase a "faction badge", which awards reputation for the chosen faction in addition to standard Vanguard or Crucible reputation. Players can change their faction once per-week. The Gunsmith NPC now offers reputation for the completion of weapon field testing bounties, which allow the ability to purchase a weekly Legendary weapon from his "Foundry Orders". A mercy rule and matchmaking improvements were added to the Crucible. Players' vaults can now also hold up to 72 armor pieces and 72 weapons.

As well, other changes were made across Destiny, including weapon and perk balancing, and minor user interface changes.

== Plot ==
The Taken King focuses on Oryx whose son Crota was the antagonist of Destiny's first DLC, The Dark Below. In revenge for the Guardians' defeat of Crota nearly a year prior, Oryx sent his Taken, Hive warriors altered by the Darkness, throughout the solar system and they subsequently converted many Vex, Cabal, Fallen, and other Hive to become Taken as well. This allowed him to acquire an overwhelming army to enact his vengeance.

The story begins with Oryx bringing his Dreadnaught and armada to the Solar System, where the Awoken, led by Queen Mara Sov, ambush him. A struggle ensues and the Awoken appear to have the upper hand, however, this ends with the Awoken fleet being destroyed and the apparent deaths of Queen Mara Sov and Prince Uldren Sov. However, much of Oryx's fleet is also destroyed, stalling his advance. The destruction of the Awoken fleet disturbs Eris Morn, a former Guardian who lost her fireteam at the hands of Oryx's son. With the guidance of Ghost, the Guardian is sent to investigate a Cabal distress signal on Phobos, but is ambushed and forced to evacuate, where it is revealed to the Guardian that Oryx has corrupted the Cabal in order to make his Taken army. In the Last City, the Vanguard discuss the attack and the Awoken, until Eris Morn interrupts and tells the Vanguard of Oryx's intentions. The Guardian is then sent to obtain a new power to combat this new enemy: Titans are sent to Mercury to find a rogue clan of Titans known as the Sunbreakers; Warlocks must perform a Stormcaller ritual within a lightning storm on Mars; Hunters must find Cayde-6's old friend named Tevis, a Nightstalker Hunter, in the Black Garden.

Cayde-6 then sends the Guardian to search his secret stash in the Russian Cosmodrome for a stealth drive to infiltrate Oryx's ship with. He convinces the Tower's shipwright, Amanda Holliday, to attach it to Eris's ship, as it has the scent of the Hive from her many years spent on the Moon. The Guardian uses Eris's modified ship to attempt to infiltrate the Dreadnaught, but is spotted. The Dreadnaught's main weapon is fired, destroying Eris's ship. Narrowly escaping death by teleporting out of the ship and onto the Dreadnaught, the Guardian and Ghost explores and disables the weapon. The Guardian also discovers that the Cabal have also boarded the Dreadnaught by ramming one of their warships into it and plan to destroy the ship. In order to reach Oryx, the Guardian must steal what remains of Crota's soul from his tomb on the Moon so that they can pass through a portal on the Dreadnaught called a Rupture. The Guardian is able to get cloaking tech from the Warmind Rasputin to sneak into Crota's tomb, and successfully recovers Crota's soul with help from Eris when the cloaking tech fails. The Guardian infiltrates the Dreadnaught and is able to pass through the Rupture, and after fighting Oryx's guards, the Guardian reaches Oryx. After defeating him, Oryx draws the Light that was gathered in his sword and vanishes. The mid-credits scene shows Eris Morn touching Oryx's sword and then watches it crumble, taking the crystal that was inside of it.

After returning to the Tower, the Guardian engages further in the Taken War, and is tasked by the Vanguard of the Tower, as well as Petra and Variks of the Vestian Outpost to eliminate remaining Taken threats across the Solar System. Although it was believed that Oryx was destroyed, he in fact survived. A Guardian fireteam is assembled to storm Oryx's Dreadnaught, where he can be permanently killed ("King's Fall" raid). The Guardians battle the Warpriest, Oryx's loyal general, Golgoroth, his beloved pet, and his daughters, Ir Anûk and Ir Halak, who are his chief scientists and lieutenants. The raid culminates in a showdown with Oryx himself, who wields the power of Darkness against the Guardians. The Guardians kill Oryx and send his decaying body hurtling towards Saturn. Eris Morn then constructs a rifle using Oryx's tainted heart, as well as a collection of elemental blades imbued with the core of his prized sword to aid the Guardians in their continued war against the Taken.

=== Epilogue (April Update) ===
Sometime following the aftermath of Oryx's defeat, a Taken prince called Malok, Pride of Oryx, arose to try and claim the throne as the new Taken King. Learning of this new threat, Variks tasks the Guardian with hunting down Malok on the Dreadnaught, with the intent of having him imprisoned in the Prison of Elders. Finding Malok and after the ensuing battle, Malok flees, forcing the Guardian to find clues to the prince's new whereabouts. Tracking him down to the Shrine of Oryx on the Moon, Eris tasks the Guardian with destroying Malok, instead of capturing him for Variks, believing it best for him to be eliminated, to which the Guardian does. (Note: The "At the Gates" quest, consisting of the "Pretender to the Throne" story mission and "Blighted Chalice" strike, was added in the April Update, released on April 12, 2016.)

The events of Destiny: Rise of Iron follow.

== Development ==
The development of The Taken King aimed to continue addressing criticisms surrounding Destiny and its previous expansions by critics and players; executive producer Mark Noseworthy stated that Bungie had analyzed "about what people want to do, what they're enjoying, what they're not liking", and used this information to influence its content. Destiny had historically been panned by critics for its repetitive mission structure and disjointed narrative—a side effect of having changed the initial story late in original development. Noseworthy stated that Bungie was "definitely trying to improve the storytelling" of Destiny, and that with The Taken King, their goal was to "deliver a story that players can really sink their teeth into. The Taken King's a villain, a bad guy that you see and understand, and his motivations and what he's doing. You're trying to stop. You understand the steps you're taking to get there, to defeat him. We're definitely trying to improve the storytelling in the game."

Changes were made to other areas as well; strike designer James Tsai explained that the strike missions in The Taken King were designed to be less "static" and have "personality", emphasizing dynamic elements such as enemy types and placements, dialogue, and the ability to earn exclusive gear. The new raid mission, "King's Fall", was described by creative director Luke Smith as being "our biggest raid to date – in terms of encounters, of spaces, of the conclusion. It is our most epic finale". Unlike the previous raids, "King's Fall" was designed at its harder difficulty level first, and then scaled down for its easier mode, rather than vice versa. Lead designer Gavin Irby explained that the harder version would not only have higher-leveled enemies, but additional mechanics that must be dealt with. On November 26, 2015, Bungie announced that it would add new weekly bonus challenges to King's Fall in early-December, in which one of its boss fights will have an additional objective that will reward bonus items if met.

Ghost was recast with Nolan North for The Taken King. According to Bungie, the actor change was made due to Dinklage's availability. Ghost assumes a larger speaking role in The Taken King, accompanying the Guardian aboard the Dreadnaught of the Hive god Oryx. The character's expanded role coincided with North replacing Dinklage and the retroactive re-recording the entire role of Ghost originated by Dinklage in the base game. Creative director Luke Smith explained that Bungie wanted one version of Ghost to accompany the player from the beginning of the game through the expansion. North was excited to put his mark on the role and hoped to evolve the character in future Destiny releases; his subsequent work introduced a more overtly comic side to Ghost.

== Release ==
The Taken King is available as paid downloadable content to owners of Destiny and its two existing expansions, The Dark Below and House of Wolves, and is priced at US$40—double the price of the previous two expansions individually. Bungie community manager Eric "Urk" Osborne justified the increased price, owing to the amount of content in The Taken King and the quality of its presentation. Players who purchase The Taken King receive an item called Spark of Light, which will boost one new character to level 25, the minimum level needed to play The Taken King content. Due to the ways and means that The Taken King content is dispersed throughout the game, players who do not purchase the expansion experience a loss of in-game content availability, including the removal of higher level Strike playlists (including the weekly Heroic and Nightfall-level Strike modes; only a single, Level 20 "classic" playlist remains available), and mode-based Crucible playlists (only 3-on-3 and 6-on-6 playlists using existing maps are available). The core story content is still available to those who do not own The Taken King.

The Taken King is also available as part of a new SKU of Destiny known as the "Legendary Edition", which features the game and all downloadable content up to and including The Taken King. A limited "Collector's Edition" is exclusive to GameStop and includes additional memorabilia, such as a collection of artwork and a replica Strange Coin, a SteelBook case, and additional in-game items (three armor shaders, and an exotic class item and emote for each class). The items from the "Collector's Edition" will be available separately as an additional paid DLC for those who do not purchase the limited editions. A Digital Collector's Edition is also available, which includes the content of the "Legendary Edition" and the additional in-game items. Existing players who owned the previous two expansions and had a character of at least level 30 received additional commemorative items. A 500 GB white PlayStation 4 bundle with Destiny-themed artwork, and a voucher for the Digital Collector's Edition, is also available.

Per an ongoing exclusivity agreement with Sony Interactive Entertainment, certain content in The Taken King was exclusive to PlayStation platforms until October 2017, which included a strike ("Echo Chamber"), a Crucible map ("Sector 618"), an exotic scout rifle ("The Jade Rabbit"), and a legendary gear set for each class: Hesperos (Titan), Azoth Bend (Warlock), and Neuroghast (Hunter). The periodical Iron Banner Crucible mode also featured timed-exclusive gear for PlayStation platforms. Although originally listed as being exclusive until "at least Fall 2016", it was reported in August 2016 that the exclusivity period for The Taken King content had been silently extended by an additional year.

=== Post-release content ===
For Year Two following the release of The Taken King, senior designer Derek Carroll explained that the studio wanted to shift towards an "event-based model" with "surprises" for players, available to all owners of The Taken King at no additional charge, as opposed to a timed roadmap, as had previously been speculated. Marketing director Eric Osborne further clarified its plans for "Year Two", stating that it would not consist solely of time-limited events as had been implied by others, but new "events, activities, content, and features", as well as an event planned for early 2016 that will be "far larger than anything you've seen since the release of The Taken King". On February 11, 2016, Bungie confirmed that a new, large expansion will release sometime in 2016, as well as an increase to the light level in the upcoming spring update. A full sequel to Destiny was also confirmed for 2017.

On October 5, 2015, Bungie announced the addition of a microtransaction-based cash shop, the "Eververse Trading Company", which allows players to purchase premium cosmetic items (such as special emote animations) with a paid currency known as Silver. The company stated that this cash shop this would "bolster the service provided by our live team for another full year".

The PvP events Iron Banner and Trials of Osiris also returned that month, with changes. In Iron Banner, drop rates for the mode's exclusive gear as end-of-match rewards were modified (although due to an unpatched bug, the first Iron Banner event held after the release of The Taken King did not have such drop rates), reputation bonuses are no-longer opt-in and steadily increase on each day of the event, and three "weekly" Iron Banner bounties reward Legendary Marks. In Trials of Osiris, winning teams now receive their reward packages immediately after they reach their respective win milestones, and matchmaking will prioritize teams with similar win totals.

In late-October 2015, a Halloween-themed "Festival of the Lost" event was held, introducing cosmetic mask items, associated quests, and the introduction of the new Crucible map Cathedral of Dusk. On December 5, 2015, Bungie announced the Sparrow Racing League event as part of the version 2.1 patch—which introduced a racing minigame utilizing the game's Sparrow vehicles, associated quests and bounties provided by NPC Amanda Holliday, and the possibility of earning exclusive items at a high SRL reputation level. SRL ran from December 8, 2015 to December 29, 2015. Both the Festival of the Lost and SRL events incorporated microtransactions for purchasing themed cosmetic items, such as special emotes, cosmetic items (such as the aforementioned masks, and vehicle horns and racing suit items respectively), and the SRL Record Book, which offered bonus cosmetic items for completing its exclusive objectives.

On December 15, 2015, it was discovered that Activision had begun to sell paid level boosting packs to automatically scale a single character to level 25, as well as award a temporary statistic boost and "Telemetry" items to assist in further levelling. These purchases mark the first instances of non-cosmetic microtransaction purchases in Destiny.

On January 27, 2016, within that week's Iron Banner event (which, for the first time, was played in Rift mode), Bungie began to experiment with modified matchmaking procedures for multiplayer games which include connection quality as a factor. A Valentine's Day-themed event called "Crimson Days" ran from February 9 to 16, 2016; the event focused on a new PvP mode known as "Crimson Doubles"—a best of five, two-on-two variation of Elimination mode where players received stat bonuses if their partner was killed. New bounties and exclusive items were offered, and new emotes (including a fist pump and a dance inspired by the music video for the song "Hotline Bling") were also added to the Eververse Trading Company.

The version 2.1.1 update launched alongside the event, which introduced a number of PvP-oriented changes. New "Freelancer" playlists were added to Crucible, offering assorted games with 3-on-3 (Elimination, Salvage, Skirmish) and 6-on-6 (Clash, Control, and Rift) modes respectively, which can only be joined by players that are not in a party. These playlists are intended to provide more "balanced" gameplay, as opponents cannot join in coordinated fireteams. Connection-based matchmaking was expanded into the Control, Rumble, Skirmish, and Trials of Osiris (Elimination) modes. Additionally, players will no longer spawn holding special weapons ammunition in 3-on-3 modes, and there will also be changes to "give you a better experience in the Crucible when there are Internet problems outside of your control".

==== April Update ====
Update 2.2.0, referred to as the "April Update", was released on April 12, 2016; the update focuses primarily on the Prison of Elders PvE arena, introducing a new Level 41-difficulty mode, and a new level 42 "Challenge" mode, in which players score points based on their performance across several bosses for a chance to earn high-level gear. The Light level cap was raised to 335; King's Fall, Court of Oryx, Trials of Osiris, Iron Banner, Crucible Weekly matches, the Weekly Nightfall Strike, and the Vanguard Heroic Playlist activities were modified to give out higher-level gear that meets the new cap, in addition to Prison of Elders. The "Winter's Run" strike of the original game was updated to have a higher difficulty and Taken enemies. Faction reputation gains were increased, and new armor and weapons were added, including the addition of a new gear feature called Chroma, which allows gear with this feature to be trimmed in a glow of one of four colors. Players' vault space was increased to be able to hold up to 108 weapons, 108 armor pieces, and 72 miscellaneous items. The update also includes a new quest storyline led by Variks, which culminates in the new "Blighted Chalice" strike where players must defeat Malok, a Taken prince attempting a rise to power in the aftermath of Oryx's defeat. PlayStation platforms also have access to an exclusive quest line, an exotic sniper rifle ("Zen Meteor"), and a legendary gear set for each class: Barkhan Dune I (Warlock), Long Tomorrow 9G (Hunter), and Jovian Guard (Titan).

== Reception ==
Reception

Aggregate score
Aggregator	Score
Metacritic	(PS4) 86/100 (XONE) 89/100

Review scores
Publication	Score
Destructoid	7/10
Eurogamer	Recommended
Game Informer	9.5/10
GameRevolution	8/10
GameSpot	8/10
Giant Bomb	4/5
Hardcore Gamer	4/5
IGN	9/10
Polygon	8.5/10
Push Square	8/10
The Guardian	4/5
USgamer	4.5/5
VentureBeat	90/100

The Taken King received critical acclaim. IGN praised the variety of changes across Destiny, as well as the revised direction of the game seen with the expansion, such as an increased focus on characterization and a storyline with clear goals and narrative. The new enemies and bosses of The Taken King were also praised for requiring players to build strategies around their unique behaviors, while the bosses themselves were lauded as being "memorable, complex, and nothing like the big bullet sponges we fought last year." In conclusion, giving the expansion a 9 out of 10, The Taken King was dubbed "an awesome upgrade that's addressed most of my biggest problems with Destiny over the past year. The rewarding loot system, fun enemies, new subclasses, and many quests have kept me busy long after the strong story missions ended."

Game Informer was similarly positive, acknowledging the more dynamic strike formats, the campaign being a "fun and coherent romp that finally gives the characters of the world personality", the various secrets within the Dreadnaught area, among other changes. In conclusion, it was felt that "the improvements to the user interface and quest system alone make the game so much more playable, but they quickly fade to the background once you dig into the content. The game is not without some minor annoyances, but the good far outweighs the bad. You couldn't pick a better time to try Destiny if you haven't yet. The Taken King is a testament to Bungie's craftsmanship and its ability to listen to the feedback from the players who both loved and hated year one."

Critics contrasted Dinklage's interpretation of Ghost with North's more expressive and player-oriented portrayal of Ghost with Dinklage's original interpretation of the character. Miller observed that North retained some vocal qualities associated with Dinklage's performance but produced a character who appeared more emotionally engaged and communicated more naturally with other members of the cast. Peckham described the decision to replace every existing recording as "unusually comprehensive recasting", a response to both practical casting difficulties and the widespread criticism of the original portrayal, noting that the online nature of Destiny meant Dinklage's performance would no longer be accessible within the updated game. Cameron Kunzelman from Vice viewed North's interpretation of Ghost as existing primarily to present the world as exciting and affirm the importance of the player. Kunzelman preferred the implied history and detachment of Dinklage's interpretation which he characterised as world-weary, historically situated and emotionally independent of the player.

=== Sales ===
Two days after its release, Sony announced that The Taken King had broken the record for the most-downloaded day-one game in PlayStation history, in terms of both total players and peak online concurrency.

== Awards ==
List of awards and nominations
Award	Category	Result	Ref.
The Game Awards 2015	Best Shooter	Nominated	
The Game Awards 2015	Best Multiplayer	Nominated	
19th Annual D.I.C.E. Awards	Action Game of the Year	Nominated	
19th Annual D.I.C.E. Awards	Outstanding Achievement in Online Gameplay	Nominated	
19th Annual D.I.C.E. Awards	Outstanding Achievement in Sound Design	Nominated	
