= Destiny: Rise of Iron =

2016 video game expansion

- Cover art featuring Lord Saladin holding the new flaming battle axe, standing before broken Cosmodrome walls
- Developer: Bungie
- Publisher: Activision
- Director: Christopher Barrett
- Producer: Scott Taylor
- Composers: Michael Salvatori; Skye Lewin; C. Paul Johnson; Rotem Moav
- Series: Destiny
- Platforms: PlayStation 4; Xbox One
- Release: WW: September 20, 2016
- Genres: Action role-playing, first-person shooter
- Mode: Multiplayer

Destiny: Rise of Iron is a major expansion for Bungie's first-person shooter, Destiny. The expansion was released on September 20, 2016, as the fourth and last expansion of Destiny. It revolves around the Fallen enemy race, as they have breached the Wall that surrounds Earth's last safe city and are utilizing the SIVA virus, a Golden Age nanotechnology characterized by self-replication and self-assembly. Lord Saladin, the last known remaining Iron Lord, guides players to become a new generation of Iron Lords and wipe out SIVA. Rise of Iron adds content across the game, including a new campaign, new missions, new player versus environment (PvE) locations, new player versus player (PvP) maps, a new PvP game mode, player gear, weaponry, a new social space, and a new raid.

Unlike the base game and the previous three expansions, which were all available on PlayStation 3, PlayStation 4, Xbox 360, and Xbox One, Rise of Iron is only available for PlayStation 4 and Xbox One. Upon the expansion's release, retailers issued Destiny: The Collection, which includes Destiny (base game), Rise of Iron, and the previous three expansions, The Dark Below, House of Wolves, and The Taken King.

== Gameplay ==
PvE features a new zone on Earth called the Plaguelands, marking the first time that there are two playable Patrol zones on one planet. There are two Patrol nodes on Earth, one for the original Cosmodrome and one for the Plaguelands. Areas of the original Cosmodrome Patrol zone have been updated to reflect the theme of the expansion, such as weather changes, and players being able to see where the Fallen have breached the Wall (the original versions of these areas are still accessible). There is also a new social space (the Iron Temple on Felwinter Peak), a new "strike," and a new raid called "Wrath of the Machine"; the normal raid unlocked on September 23, the heroic version unlocked on October 18. Two previous strikes have been updated and feature SIVA. A new limited-use flaming battle axe, called the Iron Battle Axe, is featured in certain missions and events. The Solar-based Scorch Cannon, introduced in House of Wolves returns, along with the addition of Arc and Void variants, the Shock Cannon and Null Cannon. The highest obtainable Light level was increased to 400 upon release of the hard raid. Similar to the Sparrow Racing League event in December 2015, the expansion features a "Rise of Iron Record Book" that allows players to track their progress through the expansion's content. A new public event called "Archon's Forge" was also added; it is similar to The Taken King's Court of Oryx event and can be accessed in the Plaguelands.

Artifacts, which were introduced in The Taken King expansion, received an overhaul. Previously, artifacts had an additional stat feature, were class specific, and contributed to players' light level. Rise of Iron introduced eight new artifacts that can be shared across the three character classes, and each feature game-changing abilities related to an Iron Lord, for which each new artifact is named. Players can obtain these new artifacts from new character Tyra Karn; she has missions that are dedicated to the memory of the Iron Lords. Upon completing the task, players gain the Iron Lords' Legacy, which is used to acquire one of three available artifacts per week. Of the game-changing abilities, for example, one artifact eliminates the super, but gives two grenades, two melees, and an increase to all stats. The artifacts can be combined with exotic weapons and armor, as well as subclasses, to create new build options.

Three new multiplayer maps (Floating Gardens, Last Exit, and Skyline) were added to the Crucible, as well as a new mode known as "Supremacy"—a mode similar to the "Kill Confirmed" mode of the Call of Duty franchise in which players must collect crests dropped by killed enemy players to score points. Additionally, the periodic mode "Combined Arms" returned. Combined Arms was a mode that was introduced in the base game, and it featured the Control and Clash game modes on maps with vehicles and turrets; it was removed with The Taken King. It has been updated for Rise of Iron to feature more and stronger vehicles, proper despawn of damaged vehicles, and tweaks to scoring. The ability to host private and custom multiplayer matches was also added; users can choose the game mode (including Inferno and Mayhem variants), map and time of day, score and time limits, availability of vehicles on selected maps, and whether level advantages are enabled. Players can choose the number of players for the match, including beginning a match by themselves. This feature is a free update to the core game for all players on PS4 and Xbox One, regardless of whether they purchase the expansion or not.

== Plot ==
The Iron Lords were a group of legendary Guardians established before the rise of The Last City and the creation of the Vanguard. They were renowned for their patrols around the City during the Battle of Six Fronts and the building of the Wall. The Iron Lords had a fortress located on Felwinter Peak called the Iron Temple, which was used as their primary stronghold in Old Russia. Over a hundred years ago, the Iron Lords sacrificed their lives to contain an ancient technological plague called SIVA, a Golden Age nanotechnology characterized by self-replication and self-assembly. SIVA was partly responsible for the great expansion during the Golden Age as it built entire cities. However, it turned against humanity and became a significant threat. Lord Saladin was the only known Iron Lord that survived against the SIVA virus. Since that time, he has been training Guardians in the Iron Banner in case SIVA were to plague the world again.

In the present day, a year after the Taken War, Lord Saladin sends the Guardian to Felwinter Peak to fend off the Fallen at the Iron Temple until he can arrive with reinforcements. Ghost ponders why the Fallen are there, to which they soon discover that the Fallen are being led by Sepiks Prime, now Sepiks Perfected, a former enemy thought to be dead. This confirmed Lord Saladin's fears: SIVA had been awakened by the Fallen and revived Sepiks. After securing the Iron Temple, the Guardian and Ghost meets Shiro-4, a Hunter and one of the Vanguard's most trusted scouts, as well as a friend of Cayde-6. Shiro-4 has the Guardian travel beyond the Wall into the Plaguelands. There, it is learned that the Splicers (bio-engineers) faction of the Fallen House of Devils, referred to as Devil Splicers, have been utilizing SIVA to augment themselves and become more powerful.

Tyra Karn, an archivist in the Iron Temple, sends the Guardian to Mars to find a terminal and download information pertaining to the SIVA virus, as the most brilliant scientists of the Golden Age would gather there at Clovis Bray to research SIVA and how it could be used. After completing this task, the Guardian returns to Earth and travels deep within the Plaguelands to the tomb of the Iron Lords, the heart of the SIVA virus, where it's produced. Inside the tomb, the Guardian engages the SIVA-reanimated corpses of Iron Lords Felwinter, Gheleon, and Jolder. After defeating the former Lords, Ghost initiates a self-destruct sequence inside the tomb. The Guardian escapes before detonation and seals it, destroying what remained of SIVA inside and taking the Fallen's ability to make more. After returning to the Iron Temple, Saladin rewards the Guardian with a sword only used by Iron Lords, and the Guardian becomes the first of a new generation in this legendary faction.

The Guardian then talks to Shiro-4, who informs the Guardian that the mastermind behind the SIVA Crisis, Aksis, Archon Prime, dwells inside the Cosmodrome Wall. This prompts a fireteam of Guardians to infiltrate the Wall ("Wrath of the Machine" raid). Inside the Wall, they are confronted by Vosik, the Archpriest, a Siege Engine, and finally, Aksis, who has infected himself with SIVA to the point where he is more machine than Fallen. After a long battle, the Guardians finally assassinate Aksis and end the SIVA threat once and for all.

The events of Destiny 2 follow.

== Development ==
Rise of Iron was officially confirmed by Bungie on February 11, 2016, as a new, large expansion to be released in fall 2016; they also confirmed a full sequel to Destiny to release in 2017. The title, as well as some details of the expansion, was confirmed on June 9, 2016. Rise of Iron was only released on PlayStation 4 and Xbox One; Destiny director Christopher Barrett justified the decision, acknowledging that 90% of Destiny players used the PlayStation 4 and Xbox One versions, and that Bungie had gotten to a point where "to continue to add new stuff, we would start to have to take things away. And so, we really wanted to make sure Rise of Iron is the best experience possible."

Beginning with the release of Rise of Iron, all future content and updates to Destiny are only available for the PlayStation 4 and Xbox One versions, and certain online features are no longer available to "legacy" PlayStation 3 and Xbox 360 consoles—including limited-time events and modes (such as Iron Banner), the ability to purchase premium microtransaction currency and items, certain features in the Destiny companion mobile app, and the automatic synchronization of character data between versions of Destiny for legacy and current-generation consoles within the same family (PS3 and PS4, or Xbox 360 and Xbox One). As of August 2016, save data from PS3/360 versions of Destiny are no longer synchronized with the PS4/XB1 versions, and remains separate. Players have the ability to manually "upgrade" accounts from the PS3 and Xbox 360 versions for use on the PlayStation 4 and Xbox One versions of Destiny respectively. Legacy consoles received their last update on July 26, 2016.

== Release ==
Rise of Iron was released on September 20, 2016, nearly two years after the launch of Destiny. It began Year Three of Destiny's life cycle. Rise of Iron is available as paid downloadable content to owners of Destiny and its three existing expansions, The Dark Below, House of Wolves, and The Taken King, and is priced at US$30—US$10 more than the first two expansions individually but US$10 less than The Taken King. Rise of Iron is also available as part of a new SKU of Destiny known as "Destiny: The Collection", which features the game and all downloadable content up to and including Rise of Iron. Like The Taken King, players who purchase Rise of Iron receive an item called Spark of Light that boosts one new character to level 40, the minimum level needed to play Rise of Iron's content.

Players who pre-ordered Rise of Iron received the "Iron Gjallarhorn" exotic rocket launcher, an exclusive black version of the Year One fan-favorite, Gjallarhorn, which also returned as part of a quest where players forge the weapon. Pre-orders also received the "Iron Gjallarwing" Sparrow. Just like with the release of The Taken King, veteran players received commemorative items based on a set list of Year Two challenges that were to be completed before the launch of Rise of Iron. Per an ongoing exclusivity agreement with Sony Interactive Entertainment, certain content in Rise of Iron was exclusive to PlayStation 4 until October 2017. The time-limited exclusive content included the PvE quest "Show of Strength", which awards the "Timeless Tereshkova" ship, the PvP map "Icarus", and all platform-exclusive content from The Taken King (despite Activision originally stating that it would only be exclusive through "at least Fall 2016").

On September 8, 2016, Destiny patch 2.4 was released in preparation for Rise of Iron.

=== Post-release content ===
In the September 2016 edition of Game Informer, Bungie revealed that the "Festival of the Lost" and "Sparrow Racing League" (SRL) events of 2015 would return in October and December, respectively. According to live team director Jerry Hook, "When we talk about SRL coming back, it'll probably be wrapped in a different style, not just focused around SRL....Because some of the stuff that we learned from our players around the Sparrow Racing League is that some people didn't like racing. So, can you do something with the event that helps support those players a little bit differently? Absolutely."

Iron Banner, a monthly Crucible event where level advantages are enabled, returned post-Rise of Iron's release on October 4, 2016. With it came a new quest, as well as a new character, Lady Efrideet, a former Iron Lord thought to be dead who has taken over as the Iron Banner vendor in place of Lord Saladin, who is focused on the SIVA Crisis.

Festival of the Lost returned on October 25, 2016 and ran for two weeks. It featured new quests, including one from Tyra Karn, as well as new masks and rewards, in addition to returning ones from the previous year from Eva Levante in the Tower. Additionally, all Crucible maps were set to nighttime for the duration of the event, and the Vestian Outpost and the Iron Temple were decorated, in addition to the Tower.

Sparrow Racing League returned as part of a new three-week holiday event called "The Dawning" on December 13, 2016. The event introduced a new scoring system for Strikes. There were also new quests, weapons, and gear, as well as new gifts and treasures. The Tower was also redecorated for the event. SRL itself featured new tracks and new rewards. Unlike the previous year, SRL is still accessible after the event, but only in private matches.

==== Age of Triumph ====
The final update to Destiny released on March 28, 2017. Titled "Age of Triumph", it added a new 13-page record book of challenges, tracking players' progress since the original release of Destiny in September 2014. Three of the thirteen pages are dedicated to the three character classes, while the other ten pages are dedicated to the different activities in Destiny. For example, one page is dedicated to story completion (the original game plus the four expansions), while another is dedicated to the raids and their challenges. All raids prior to Rise of Iron were increased to Light level 390 with updated rewards that can drop at 400 Light; the maximum Light level was not increased. The "Vault of Glass" and "Crota's End" raids now have weekly challenges, which were originally introduced with The Taken King's "King's Fall" raid. Additionally, every week has a featured raid where all of its challenges are active and can be completed for additional rewards.

== Reception ==
Reception

Aggregate score
Aggregator	Score
Metacritic	(PS4) 72/100 (XONE) 73/100

Review scores
Publication	Score
Game Informer	8.5/10
GameSpot	6/10
GamesRadar+	4/5
Hardcore Gamer	3/5
IGN	6.2/10
Polygon	7.5/10
Push Square	7/10
Shacknews	7/10
The Guardian	4/5
USgamer	3.5/5
VentureBeat	65/100

Destiny: Rise of Iron received "mixed or average" reviews, according to review aggregator Metacritic.

Mike Mahardy of GameSpot felt that Rise of Iron showed a "confident sense of character", with influences from Game of Thrones and The Lord of the Rings, but that its story campaign served as more of an introduction to the expansion's setting and new NPCs rather than fulfilling any "narrative promise". Mahardy argued that the campaign's storytelling was weaker than that of The Taken King, citing "one-dimensional" characters and a plot that "whisks by without conveying the weight of your missions." It was added that the missions themselves showed "a little more promise", citing "a few shining moments of stellar design" among them, such as the campaign's finale, the new "The Wretched Eye" strike (which demonstrated the game's ability to "craft a thrilling boss fight" by adding a secondary threat to the overall fight), the climax of a quest that rewards the Gjallahorn rocket launcher (which featured a large-scale battle "the likes of which Bungie hasn't created since its Halo days"), and the "Wrath of the Machine" raid (declaring it to be the "sparkling light at the end of an often-dreary tunnel", praising its unique mechanics and battles). Mahardy noted that much of the expansion depended on content and areas recycled or revisioned from previous portions of the game. The new multiplayer mode Supremacy was also panned for being inherently unoriginal, due to the presence of similar modes in other multiplayer FPS games. In conclusion, Mahardy admitted that the expansion "feels like the last remaining breath before the possible sequel, as if Destiny is standing still and waiting for inspiration to arrive, rather than going out to find it.

The Verge similarly criticized the regressions in storytelling, stating that Lord Saladin was "over-earnest, humorless, and stiffed with lines that even hermit-living superhumans wouldn't say", and that "his attempts to maintain a sense of mystery fail a few missions in." However, the breadth of content was praised, explaining that "For existing players, Rise of Iron hides weeks' worth of new missions, modes, and minor additions behind its weak story, as well as the promise of a new six-player raid coming this weekend. New Destiny players are getting even more of a deal." The expansion was noted as being reflective on the game's past, citing its Earth-centric content, a quest that awards an Exotic version of the first weapon players receive in-game, updated versions of previous missions with SIVA-infected enemies, and that unlike The Taken King, older weapons were not "jettisoned" in favor of new weapons, and can still be found and upgraded to higher levels through the infusion system. In conclusion, it was stated that "Rise of Iron is something special. It's a map for the future of Destiny, but it's also a wink and a nod at its past — a chance for people who shared the route along the way to look back at where they've come from."
