= Destiny post-release content =

DLC for the video game Destiny released from 2014 to 2017

There were four pieces of downloadable content (DLC) that were released for Bungie's 2014 first-person shooter video game Destiny. Each package of downloadable content added new player versus environment (PvE) missions and player versus player (PvP) modes, new locales to visit, and new items for the player to make use of. The game had three years of extended content.

Year One of the game featured two small expansion packs. The first was The Dark Below in December 2014, which was followed by House of Wolves in May 2015. Year Two began with the third expansion, The Taken King, which was a large expansion that released in September 2015 and had the largest effect on the game, as it changed much of the core gameplay. Upon its release, retailers issued Destiny: The Taken King Legendary Edition, which included Destiny and all DLC up to and including The Taken King. In December 2015, Destiny shifted to an event-based model, featuring more periodical limited-time events. A minor story-based update released in April 2016 called the "April Update", which acted as an epilogue to The Taken King. Year Three began with the game's fourth and final expansion called Rise of Iron, another large expansion that released in September 2016. Upon its release, retailers issued Destiny: The Collection, which includes Destiny and all DLC up to and including Rise of Iron. The game's final update, "Age of Triumph", released in March 2017, featuring updates to existing content and new challenges before the release of Destiny's sequel, Destiny 2, that September.

Although the first three downloadable content packs were available for all consoles that Destiny was originally released for (PlayStation 3, PlayStation 4, Xbox 360, and Xbox One), the fourth expansion, Rise of Iron, is only available on the PlayStation 4 and Xbox One. As per an exclusivity agreement with Sony Interactive Entertainment, Destiny and all of its expansions featured timed exclusive content for the PlayStation versions. The timed exclusive content that was available at the launch of Destiny, as well as the exclusive content of the first two expansions, became available for Xbox when The Taken King launched. The Taken King's and Rise of Iron's PlayStation exclusive content became available for Xbox in October 2017 after the launch of Destiny 2.

== Overview ==
Prior to the official release of Destiny in September 2014, Bungie declared that a major component of the game would be a continuous release of new content. Bungie Director of Production Jonty Barnes said: "We're going to continuously update the game from now until the end of time. That's always going to be part of the philosophy of Destiny. We always wanted to build a new universe but keep building upon it, rather than to do a complete and utter restart periodically". By the time of Destiny's launch, two planned packs of downloadable content (DLC) had been officially announced: The Dark Below and House of Wolves. From the launch of Destiny, players could purchase the Expansion Pass, which included the first two expansions at a discounted price versus buying them separately. Players also received an exclusive sparrow (EV-30 Tumbler) if they purchased the Expansion Pass or The Dark Below by January 15, 2015. At E3 2015, Bungie officially announced a new, larger expansion called The Taken King. On February 11, 2016, Bungie confirmed a new, large expansion for September 2016, titled Rise of Iron, and a full sequel to Destiny—Destiny 2—for 2017.

In the weeks proceeding from the release of Destiny, players were reporting areas that could be accessed by various glitches or secret accesses. These areas were described as appearing "half-baked", and were noted to often be devoid of items or NPCs. In an interview with Eurogamer, on the claims that these were on-disc DLC, Bungie president Harold Ryan replied that the content were incomplete resources intended to reduce download requirements for future DLC.

For Year Two, senior designer Derek Carroll explained that the studio wanted to shift towards an "event-based model" with "surprises" for players, available to all owners of The Taken King at no additional charge, as opposed to a timed roadmap, as had previously been speculated. Marketing director Eric Osborne further clarified its plans for "Year Two", stating that it would not consist solely of time-limited events as had been implied by others, but new "events, activities, content, and features", as well as an event planned for early 2016 that would be "far larger than anything you've seen since the release of The Taken King."

== Year 1 Expansion Pass (2014–2015) ==
An Expansion Pass was available alongside the release of Destiny, which granted access to the first two minor expansions of the game, The Dark Below and House of Wolves. While the expansions were available to purchase separately upon their respective releases, the Expansion Pass included the first two expansions at a discounted price versus buying them separately—the Expansion Pass was US$35 where the two expansions were US$20 each.

=== The Dark Below ===
Destiny – Expansion I: The Dark Below
- Cover art featuring the game's three character classes: Hunter (left), Warlock (center), and Titan (right), with Crota in the background.
- Developer: Bungie
- Publisher: Activision
- Artist: Christopher Barrett
- Writer: Joseph Staten
- Composers: Martin O'Donnell; Michael Salvatori; C Paul Johnson
- Platforms: PlayStation 3; PlayStation 4; Xbox 360; Xbox One
- Release: WW: December 9, 2014
- Genres: Action role-playing, first-person shooter
- Mode: Multiplayer

Destiny's first DLC pack, The Dark Below, was released on December 9, 2014. The expansion added new content centering on the Hive race and their deity Crota, Son of Oryx, who had been referenced in the original game. Four story missions, a strike, and a raid were added. New bounties, equipment, and three Crucible maps were also added, as well as two Crucible modes: "Inferno", a modifier on multiple modes where points are solely scored on kills and the player's radar is disabled, and "Doubles", a two-versus-two version of Skirmish. Maximum weapon attack damage was increased to 331 for new legendary and exotic weapons, and the Light level cap was increased to 32. Although previous legendary items could not be upgraded to the new stats, exotic items earned prior to the expansion's release could be upgraded through Xûr with the Exotic Shard material, however, players lost all previously earned perks, requiring them to relevel their exotics. An additional exotic weapon ("The Fourth Horseman" shotgun) and another strike ("The Undying Mind") were timed exclusives for PlayStation platforms until September 2015. A hard mode for the raid was added on January 21, 2015.

==== Plot ====
Shortly after destroying the heart of the Black Garden, Eris Morn, a former guardian and the only surviving member of a team who tried to previously take on Crota, comes out of hiding and returns to the Tower to warn of the Hive prince's pending return. Her first quest tasks the Guardian with killing a Hive Knight on Earth called the Fist of Crota. The Guardian then sets out to stop the Hive from overtaking Rasputin, who are led by a powerful Hive Wizard called Omnigul, the Will of Crota. After the Guardian destroys a massive ogre called the Might of Crota, Omnigul flees. Eris then has the Guardian travel to the Moon to stop the Hive from summoning their god. This the Guardian does and they destroy a crystal that contained part of Crota's soul.

After returning to the Tower, Eris assigns the Guardian with two more quests. The first of these has the Guardian to fill an urn called the Urn of Sacrifice with the ashes of defeated Hive on Earth, including a powerful Hive Knight called Urzok, the Hated. The Guardian then takes it to the Moon to collect Hive eyes for Eris. The second quest has the Guardian destroy the remaining servants of Crota on Earth called the Heart of Crota, the Hand of Crota, and the Eyes of Crota. This leads to the strike, "The Will of Crota", where the Guardian hunts down and eliminates Omnigul.

Despite the Guardian's best efforts, including destroying part of Crota's soul, they were not able to prevent Crota's awakening. The expansion culminates with the raid, "Crota's End", where a team of guardians travel deep within the caverns of the Moon where they take on Ir Yût, the Deathsinger (another powerful Hive Wizard) before completely destroying the Hive prince himself.

The events of Destiny: House of Wolves follow.

In the base game, there is a story mission called "The Sword of Crota" where the Guardian is tasked with destroying the weapon. When The Taken King released, it added a new questing system to the game and this mission became the first mission of The Dark Below quest line.

==== Reception ====
Reception

Aggregate score
Aggregator	Score
Metacritic	(PS4) 63/100 (XONE) 59/100

Review scores
Publication	Score
Destructoid	6.5/10
Eurogamer	6/10
GameSpot	6/10
GamesRadar+	3/5 stars
IGN	6/10
Polygon	5/10
Push Square	5/10 stars

The Dark Below received a mixed reception from reviewers, who were critical of its content. It has an aggregate score of 63/100 for the PlayStation 4 version (based on 41 reviews) and 59/100 for the Xbox One version (based on 4 reviews) from Metacritic—no score is available for the PlayStation 3 and Xbox 360 versions. Vince Ingenito of IGN, who gave the expansion a 6/10, stated that the only reason to purchase the expansion was for the raid. He said there was very little to do in the expansion, stating "I saw barely anything substantial that I hadn't seen in Destiny before", noting how the expansion's story missions were just recycled areas of the base game. He also criticized the story, saying it did not add much to the lore of Destiny. Justin Clark of GameSpot, who also gave it a 6/10, had similar remarks and criticized the amount of grinding needed to play the expansion's content. Clark, however, did enjoy the quest that involved killing Urzok, the Hated. Urzok is a powerful enemy that appears in the middle of a periodic event, a chaotic war between the Fallen and the Hive, and any player can participate. He said these are the type of events that Destiny should have more often. Tom Bramwell of Eurogamer, who also gave it a 6/10, was more positive of the story missions, but was critical of how all pre-expansion gear is effectively obsolete. All new gear featured higher attack and defense, but the old gear, with the exception of exotics, could not be upgraded. Although exotics could be upgraded, all the work players had put into maxing them out became wasted because they had to redo all the work to max them out to the new stats.

=== House of Wolves ===
Destiny – Expansion II: House of Wolves
- Cover art featuring the game's three character classes: Hunter (left), Warlock (center), and Titan (right), with Skolas in the background.
- Developer: Bungie
- Publisher: Activision
- Artist: Christopher Barrett
- Writer: Joseph Staten
- Composers: Martin O'Donnell; Michael Salvatori; C Paul Johnson
- Platforms: PlayStation 3; PlayStation 4; Xbox 360; Xbox One
- Release: WW: May 19, 2015
- Genres: Action role-playing, first-person shooter
- Mode: Multiplayer

House of Wolves was released on May 19, 2015; the expansion added new content centering on the Fallen race, as players attempt to thwart a campaign by Skolas, Kell of Kells, to unite the Fallen race under his rule. The expansion added a new social space (the Vestian Outpost), which is the hub for the expansion's content, six story missions, bounties, weapons and gear, a new special weapon class (sidearm), a strike, and three Crucible maps. An additional Crucible map ("The Timekeeper") was a timed exclusive for PlayStation platforms until September 2015. A revamped upgrading system was introduced: players could reforge new legendary weapons (except House of Judgment and Trials of Osiris weapons) to try to achieve better perks. Upon obtaining the Etheric Light and Exotic Shard materials, players could "ascend" all legendary and exotic items, respectively, to the highest levels possible as of the expansion: Light level cap 34 and 365 damage for weapons. Because of the backlash of the first expansion, players did not lose any perks on their items when upgrading to the new stats. A limited-use weapon was added and is only available in certain missions: the "Scorch Cannon" (similar to a rocket launcher but the rockets can be attached to enemies and their explosion delayed to cause more damage). Two new multiplayer modes were also added: Prison of Elders (PvE arena) and Trials of Osiris (PvP game type).

- Prison of Elders is a cooperative mode, in which a team of three players fights against waves of enemies with varying gameplay modifiers, culminating with a final boss. The level 28 version includes matchmaking, while the higher levels require players to have a pre-made fireteam, unless they want to attempt them solo. The level 28, 32, and 34 difficulty boss changes weekly, but level 35's does not. The Taken King's April Update added a new Prison of Elders quest, bounties, a level 41 difficulty with matchmaking, and a level 42 score-based mode called "Challenge of the Elders"; players can purchase an "Elder's Sigil" scorecard from Variks, which has different weekly challenges and obtaining the weekly high scores rewards high-level gear.
- Trials of Osiris is a weekly, time-limited PvP event held between Fridays and Tuesdays, in which a fireteam of three members attempts to win as many matches as possible. Matches use the Crucible mode "Elimination": a three-versus-three, best-of-nine rounds mode that was also added with this expansion. A fireteam can continue participating until they amass 9 victories or 3 losses. Participating in Trials of Osiris requires the purchase of a "Trials Passage" scorecard from Brother Vance at the Vestian Outpost; items that can add a win to the card or indemnify a loss can also be bought with "Passage Coins" that are earned by playing Trials. Reaching varying numbers of wins on the score card allows the player to earn rewards—for example, reaching five earns a featured armor piece, and reaching seven earns a featured weapon. Going undefeated with nine wins unlocks The Lighthouse, an exclusive social space on Mercury with greater rewards. If a team amasses three losses, they can try again by buying a new Trials Passage. With the release of The Taken King expansion, Trials now has its own set of bounties with additional rewards.

==== Plot ====
A few months following the events of The Dark Below, Skolas, the former Kell (leader) of the House of Wolves, has been freed from the Reef's Prison of Elders by a member of an ancient and mysterious group called the Nine. A prophecy foretold that a Kell would rise up and unite all Fallen Houses. Believing himself to be this Kell, Skolas declares himself the Kell of Kells and frees his imprisoned lieutenants and rallies the House of Wolves against the Awoken, thus beginning a campaign to unite all Fallen Houses under his rule.

To try and recruit guardians to combat the rising threat, Queen Mara Sov orders that the Reef's Vestian Outpost be opened to them. Located in the asteroid belt, the Outpost is the residence of Petra Venj and Variks the Loyal, who serve as guides for the Guardian. The Guardian is sent to Venus to stop Skolas from gaining support from the House of Winter, but is unsuccessful. On Earth, Skolas tries to gain support from the House of Devils and House of Kings, but the Guardian interferes and is this time successful at keeping them from joining Skolas. In the process, they also eliminate members of a Fallen assassination team called the Silent Fang and three Fallen Barons, Yavek of the Wolves and Paskin and Vekis of the Kings. The Wolves return to Venus and break into the Vault of Glass to steal the Vex technology to further Skolas's goals, however, Skolas and the Wolves are eventually overpowered by the Guardian. Chasing the Kell of Kells to the top of Venus's Citadel, Skolas is captured and returned to the Prison of Elders.

As punishment for his crimes, the Queen has a fireteam of guardians enter into Skolas's lockup in the Prison of Elders to execute the former Kell ("Skolas's Revenge" – Level 35 Prison of Elders arena). Petra also has bounties for the Guardian to eliminate other high-ranking members of the Wolves, including a mission to kill the Archon-Slayer Skoriks. Variks has the Guardian complete the strike "The Shadow Thief" to eliminate Taniks, the Scarred, a mercenary for hire among the Fallen who is employed by the Wolves but does not belong to any House.

The events of Destiny: The Taken King follow.

In the base game, there is a story mission called "Scourge of Winter" where the Guardian is tasked with killing Draksis, Winter's Kell. When The Taken King released, it added a new questing system to the game and this mission became the first mission of the House of Wolves quest line.

==== Reception ====
Reception

Aggregate score
Aggregator	Score
Metacritic	(PS4) 72/100 (XONE) 71/100

Review scores
Publication	Score
Destructoid	5/10
Eurogamer	Recommended
GameRevolution	6/10 stars
GameSpot	6/10
GamesRadar+	4.5/5 stars
IGN	7.5/10
Polygon	7/10
Push Square	6/10 stars

House of Wolves received better reception than its predecessor, The Dark Below. It has an aggregate score of 72/100 for the PlayStation 4 version (based on 31 reviews) and 71/100 for the Xbox One version (based on 4 reviews) from Metacritic—no score is available for the PlayStation 3 and Xbox 360 versions. Jose Otero of IGN, who gave it a 7.5/10, said that the expansion "learns from its predecessor's mistakes." Although it did not fix Destiny's issues with the story or its loot system, "it does introduce new, sensible gear upgrade paths, a fun new campaign with a few surprises, and rewarding endgame activities". There was less grinding as gear dropped at higher levels than previously, however, this only applied to House of Wolves gear. The new Etheric Light material was praised, as it let all previous legendary gear be upgraded to the new stats without having to relevel the gear, although the material was a rare drop. The Prison of Elders PvE arena was praised, but Otero said that there was not a lot of variety in its objectives. He said that although it was not as impressive as a raid, "it's unique enough to stand on its own merits." Trials of Osiris was also praised. Martin Robinson of Eurogamer had similar remarks and said the expansion "deliver[s] an overhaul of systems and a stream of modes and features that are the best thing to happen to Destiny since its launch." He said it felt like Bungie remembered what made their previous games so special. Robinson highly praised the new sidearm weapon, calling it one of Bungie's best guns on par with pistols in their previous Halo games. The new level cap was praised for being easier to obtain than previously. He said that although the expansion was not a radical overhaul, it was a serious step in the right direction.

== Major expansions (2015–2016) ==
Destiny featured a major expansion released annually each fall until the release of Destiny 2. These large expansions typically had a major impact on the game, versus the minor content drops, such as the two small expansions of Year 1. There were only two major expansions released for Destiny—The Taken King in September 2015 and Rise of Iron in September 2016—before the release of Destiny 2 in September 2017. Each major expansion marked the beginning of a new year in Destiny's lifecycle. The original Destiny's lifecycle lasted three years before the release of Destiny 2, which began its own yearly lifecycle.

=== Year 2: The Taken King ===
The Taken King
- Developer: Bungie
- Platforms: Xbox One, Xbox 360, PlayStation 4, PlayStation 3
- Release: September 15, 2015
- Genres: Massively multiplayer online game (MMO), First Person Shooter (FPS) and Action and Adventure

The third expansion, The Taken King, was released on September 15, 2015, marking the beginning of "Year Two" of Destiny. The expansion focuses on Oryx, The Taken King and father of Crota, as he leads a new race of enemy, the Taken, to avenge his son's death. Players have access to a new PvE area, the Dreadnaught, Oryx's massive ship situated in the rings of Saturn (with its own Patrol mode), as well as playable missions on Mars' moon Phobos (previously only available in PvP), and the raid, "King's Fall"; the hard version raised the highest obtainable Light level to 320 and the April 2016 update increased it to 335. A new public activity called Court of Oryx is accessed during the Dreadnaught's Patrol mode with random bosses and three levels of difficulty. A new heavy weapon was introduced, a sword, which has new mechanics from the swords that can be used during certain Hive missions. Three new strikes were added and three Year One strikes were revised to include the Taken race in addition to the other enemies. Seven new Crucible maps were added, in addition to three new PvP modes, "Rift", "Mayhem", and a new version of Control called "Zone Control". New sub-classes were added for all three classes; the Void-based "Nightstalker" for Hunter, the Arc-based "Stormcaller" for Warlock, and the Solar-based "Sunbreaker" for Titan. A new quest storyline was added in the "April Update" where players must defeat Malok, a Taken prince attempting a rise to power in the aftermath of Oryx's defeat.

Like the previous expansions, The Taken King had timed exclusives for PlayStation platforms, which lasted until October 2017 (although originally planned to last until September 2016). Two new retail versions of Destiny, the "Legendary Edition" and "Collector's Edition", were released alongside The Taken King: both included a copy of the game, all "Year One" DLC, and The Taken King. A Digital Collector's Edition was also available. Year One players received commemorative items when purchasing The Taken King. A new PS4 bundle was also available, which included a limited edition white 500GB PS4 with Destiny artwork on the face of the console, the Legendary Edition of Destiny: The Taken King, and all bonus content from the Legendary and Digital Collector's Editions. Players who purchased The Taken King received an item called Spark of Light, which boosted one new character to level 25, the minimum level needed to play The Taken King's content.

=== Year 3: Rise of Iron ===
The fourth and last expansion, Rise of Iron, was released on September 20, 2016, and marked the beginning of "Year Three" of Destiny. The expansion focuses on the Fallen race, as they have breached the Wall that surrounds the City and are armed with the SIVA virus, a Golden Age breakthrough in self-assembling nanotechnology. Lord Saladin, head of the Iron Banner PvP event, is a major character and leads players as they set out to become the new generation of the Iron Lords and wipe out SIVA. A new social space called the Iron Temple was added and is located on Earth at Felwinter Peak, and players have access to a new zone on Earth called the Plaguelands, marking the first time that there were two playable Patrol zones on one planet. In the Plaguelands, players encounter a new faction of Fallen called the Devil Splicers. A new public event called "Archon's Forge" is also accessible in the Plaguelands; it is similar to The Taken King's Court of Oryx event. A new strike was also added, as well as a new raid, "Wrath of the Machine"; the normal version unlocked on September 23 and the hard version unlocked on October 18. The highest obtainable Light level was increased to 400 with the release of the hard raid. A new limited-use flaming battle axe is featured in certain missions, and PvP received a new mode called "Supremacy", three new maps, as well as the option to make custom private matches in PvP—private matchmaking is available to all players on PlayStation 4 and Xbox One, regardless if they purchase Rise of Iron. The final update to Destiny released on March 28, 2017. Titled "Age of Triumph", it added a 13-page record book, tracking players' progress since the original release of Destiny, and all raids prior to Rise of Iron were increased to Light level 390 with updated rewards that drop at 400 Light; the maximum Light level was not increased.

Unlike the base game and the previous three expansions, which were all available on PlayStation 3, PlayStation 4, Xbox 360, and Xbox One, Rise of Iron is only available on PlayStation 4 and Xbox One. Character progression, which was previously shared across consoles of the same family, became separate. Players who pre-ordered Rise of Iron received the "Iron Gjallarhorn" exotic rocket launcher and the "Iron Gjallarwing" Sparrow. Like the previous expansions, Rise of Iron had timed exclusives for the PlayStation 4 that lasted until October 2017, and just like with the release of The Taken King, veteran players received commemorative items. A new retail version of Destiny called "Destiny: The Collection" was released. It features the game and all downloadable content up to and including Rise of Iron. Like The Taken King, players who purchase Rise of Iron receive an item called Spark of Light, although this one boosts one new character to level 40, which is the minimum level needed to play Rise of Iron's content.

== Limited-time events ==
Destiny featured a number of limited-time events, lasting from one to three weeks. Although Year 1 only featured one limited-time event, Bungie announced in December 2015 that for Year 2, they would focus on doing more of these types of events instead of doing a big DLC pack every few months, like The Dark Below and House of Wolves. Beginning with the first Festival of the Lost event, the social spaces were redecorated for the events.

=== Queen's Wrath ===
Shortly after the launch of Destiny, a two-week long event began on September 23, 2014 called "Queen's Wrath" with Petra Venj as its main NPC. This event featured bounties and multiple challenges on existing missions for players to complete to obtain exclusive items. This was the only limited-time event to occur during Year 1 of the game.

=== Festival of the Lost ===
A two-week long Halloween-themed event began on October 26, 2015 called "Festival of the Lost" where players could complete quest lines to earn decorative masks for their Guardians. Eva Levante was the main NPC for this event. The masks were of different NPCs and main bosses in the game. During the event, players had to wear certain masks to complete parts of the quests (e.g., complete a heroic strike while wearing The Speaker mask). Masks were rewarded randomly and every player received a mask at the start of the event. Rare masks went away after the event but Legendary ones were kept. New emotes were added to the Eververse Trading Company, including the Zombie Dance, inspired by the "Thriller" Dance. A new Crucible map, Cathedral of Dusk, was also released during this event. It was available to all players during the event, but became accessible to only those who owned The Taken King after the event.

Festival of the Lost returned on October 25, 2016 for two weeks. It featured new quests, including one from new NPC Tyra Karn (added in Rise of Iron) in the Iron Temple, as well as new masks and rewards, in addition to returning ones from the previous year from Eva Levante. Additionally, all Crucible maps were set to nighttime for the duration of the event, and the Vestian Outpost and the Iron Temple were decorated, in addition to the Tower. This event returned during Year 2 of Destiny 2 in October 2018 and continued to be held annually.

=== Sparrow Racing League & The Dawning ===
On December 8, 2015, a new three-week long event became available called "Sparrow Racing League" (SRL) with Amanda Holliday as its main NPC. In this event, players raced against each other on their sparrows, which Bungie described as a "six-player, free-for-all death race through enemy territory". Two race tracks were made specifically for this event: one on Mars and the other on Venus. Maps also featured obstacles, such as enemies who would shoot at players. Through this event, players could earn new sparrows and gear. Helmets and class items could drop with a Light level and could be infused, while other gear only had perks to help while racing. New quest lines and bounties were added for the event. The Eververse Trading Company added new emotes, including the Energetic Dance, inspired by the "Jump On It!" Dance. Eververse also featured toolkits for new sparrows, horns for the sparrows, and a record book which gave players special SRL objectives; completing those tasks resulted in exclusive gear like an emblem and an armor shader. There was also a PlayStation exclusive quest for the event. The event, however, was only available to players who owned The Taken King. According to Bungie, sparrow racing was originally an experiment to see if players would like it.

Sparrow Racing League returned as part of a new three-week holiday event called "The Dawning" on December 13, 2016. The event introduced a new scoring system for Strikes, with new "elite" Vanguard bounties. There were also new quests, weapons, and gear, as well as new gifts and treasures. The Tower was also redecorated for the event. SRL itself featured new tracks and new rewards. Some rewards were obtainable through a two-part record book; the first part were objectives for SRL and the second part were objectives for Strikes. Unlike the previous year, SRL stayed after the conclusion of the event, but could only be accessed in private matches. The Dawning continued in the sequel as an annual event. SRL itself remained absent from the sequel until the game's final update in June 2026, and it was also included in the mobile game Destiny: Rising that released in August 2025.

=== Crimson Days ===
A Valentine's Day-themed event called "Crimson Days" commenced on February 9, 2016 and lasted for one week. Lord Shaxx was the main NPC of the event with a new quest line and bounties for players. Senior designer Leif Johansen said the reason for its short length was because they "[did not] want [the event] to overstay its welcome and drift away from its 'small and fun' goal". The event featured a new Crucible mode called Crimson Doubles, which was a two-versus-two Elimination-style mode featuring "a special twist". The twist was a buff called "Broken Heart": when a teammate died, the player would get maxed-out stats, giving them a better chance to revive their ally. A teammate's kills counted towards the player's own bounties as well. Players also had the chance to earn exclusive gear. New emotes were also added to the Eververse Trading Company, including the Strange Dance, inspired by the "Hotline Bling" Dance. This event did not return in 2017, but did return in Destiny 2 and continued annually until it was discontinued in 2021.
