= Destiny: Rising =

2025 mobile game

- Developer: NetEase Games
- Publisher: NetEase Games
- Series: Destiny
- Engine: Messiah Engine
- Platforms: Android; iOS
- Release: August 28, 2025
- Genres: First-person shooter, third-person shooter, looter shooter, action role-playing, MMO
- Mode: Multiplayer

Destiny: Rising is a free-to-play, massively multiplayer online video game developed and published by NetEase, with licensing from Bungie. A live service mobile game that is part of the Destiny series, it was released worldwide (with some exceptions) on August 28, 2025, for Android and iOS devices. The game is set in an alternate timeline, taking place many years prior to the events of the original Destiny (2014). Players collect and choose from a selection of characters with distinct abilities, aiming to restore human civilization as it emerges from a second dark age.

== Gameplay ==
Protagonist Wolf explores the Jiangshi Metro area in third-person.

Destiny: Rising is a mobile role-playing game that places players in a "shared world" with single-player, PVE multiplayer, and PVP multiplayer modes available, plus multiplayer modes which are a mix of both. In addition to friends and matchmade players, it also offers the option to play with bots when insufficient other players are available. Unlike its first-person shooter predecessors, Rising can also be played as a third-person shooter. The game supports touchscreen, game controller, and mouse and keyboard control schemes, with developer NetEase offering official emulator support, via their own MuMuPlayer application, for those who wish to play on Windows or macOS devices.

Rather than controlling a character of a specific class, as in mainline Destiny games, players choose from a roster of characters known as Lightbearers who each manifest one of the game's three core elements called Solar, Arc, and Void, each with unique abilities and stories. The game included 10 playable characters at launch, with two more following in its first official season. Characters vary in the weapon types which can be equipped in their two weapon slots: Primary, which have infinite ammunition, and Power, which have finite ammunition. Players have a shared inventory, allowing weapons to be shared between all characters available to them. Additionally, characters each possess a Relic, which determines their abilities.

The game uses similar looter shooter mechanics to other games in the Destiny series. Players acquire equipment such as weapons, character customization items named Artifacts, and weapon customization items called Mods, all of varying rarity levels. The rarest Exotic tier weapons feature unique abilities and visual designs. Existing equipment can also be made more powerful using in-game resources. Additionally, players can earn experience points for their team overall, with each of their characters increasing in strength to match that team level. Having completed the main campaign, players can also progress through levels of "Acclaim" to earn more powerful Artifacts and rewards.

Rising features some gameplay elements not currently present within the concurrent main title Destiny 2, such as racing for in-game 'Sparrow' vehicles (a feature available in the original Destiny), a player housing system, and the ability to dual-wield weapons. It also features mini-games, including fishing, a collectible card game named Shadowshaper Duels, and a Flappy Bird-style side-scrolling game. Rising also includes a roguelike game mode called Singularity where players fight waves of enemies using randomized benefits. Players also have the ability to create clans, known as Packs, to cooperate with other players to build a shared space and search for shared resources.

== Premise ==
Bungie, the developers of the main Destiny games, described Rising as a "brand-new adventure set in an alternate Destiny timeline". It takes place many years prior to the original Destiny, before the existence of the Tower and Guardians; however, due to its separate timeline, it does not affect the story of the mainline games and contains aspects which contradict their canon.

Following a golden age caused by the arrival of an entity known as "The Traveller" and the subsequent "Collapse" caused by alien invaders, humanity is recovering from a second dark age and entering the early "City Age". Creatures born from the damaged Traveller (known as Ghosts), resurrect those humans capable of wielding its "Light" against their enemies, creating entities known as "Lightbearers."

During the game's announcement, Bungie described the game's setting as follows:

"With the help of legendary Iron Lords, humanity has broken free the shackles of tyranny and began to rally together against the alien forces intent on its extinction. Amidst the chaos of this early age for The City, a new generation of Lightbearers, resurrected by mysterious entities known as Ghosts, set out to restore humanity's prominence and secure its future."

The primary protagonist is a character called Wolf, whose appearance and voice players can customize. Some characters, such as Ikora Rey and Iron Lord Jolder, have featured in prior games, whereas others are new to the franchise. The city of Haven serves as a central refuge for both Lightbearers and mortal survivors of Earth's collapse. From this sanctuary, players explore locations across Earth, such as the "icy, ancient" Jiangshi metro and the "arid" Red Sea Rift, seeking "seeds of hope" for human civilization. Alien races from the main games also appear as adversaries in Rising, including the Vex, the Hive, the Fallen, and the Cabal.

== Business model ==
As a free-to-play game, Rising is a live service game, like the concurrent main title Destiny 2, having optional in-game microtransactions to generate revenue. Though in-game weapons are obtained primarily via gameplay, additional characters are obtained via a gacha system (also known as loot boxes), with higher tier characters featuring the lowest likelihood of being obtained. Duplicate copies of characters can also be combined to increase their effectiveness. As a result, it is considered a "pay-to-win" game.

Additionally, the game features multiple subscriptions which players can opt into, such as the Premium Battle Pass, each offering distinct in-game benefits. In-game currency, "Bundles", and cosmetic items can also be purchased via microtransactions.

Similar to other free-to-play video games, Rising also employs a time-gating "energy" system. While waiting for their energy to recharge, players can still continue in-game activities, but receive substantially lower rewards for doing so.

== Development ==
In June 2018, it was announced that Bungie, the developers responsible for Destiny and Destiny 2, had received over US$100,000,000 as part of an investment from the Chinese company NetEase, granting them "a minority stake in Bungie and a seat on its board of directors". Bungie chief executive officer Pete Parsons stated that the partnership was intended to help them "be a global game and entertainment company ... to build games that are inspiring people from around the world". Before that point, Bungie games had never been released in mainland China, and NetEase were responsible for operating mainland China versions of Blizzard games (such as World of Warcraft and Overwatch); however, Parsons stated that there was "no explicit deal [to publish our games in China]".

Initial speculation on the collaboration between these two companies was that they would be working on a new AAA title (potentially named "Matter") and not any Destiny games; however, in September 2021, rumors began to surface (based on job postings on the company's official website) that Bungie was working on a mobile game set within the Destiny universe, then in April 2022 another job post indicated that Bungie was working to extend their existing proprietary game engine (the "Tiger Engine") to support mobile devices. In July 2022, a source with "knowledge of NetEase's development plans" informed The Game Post that they were working on a new Destiny game not related to Bungie's concurrent title Destiny 2. It was stated that development efforts on the game had been underway for "well over two years". GameSpot then reported in September 2024 that, despite recent staffing cuts at Bungie (impacting 220 employees), the game was still in development and would be called Destiny Rising (stylized without a colon). In the same month, a former NetEase developer's LinkedIn profile described a NetEase project on the "Destiny IP" (assumed to be Destiny Rising) as "a project developed jointly by Netease[sic] & Bungie" and "a MMOFPS/TPS+RPG game, with high standards".

In October 2024, Bungie officially announced Destiny: Rising (with a colon; previously codenamed "Viper") as a free-to-play entry in the series for iOS and Android mobile devices, developed and published by NetEase, and officially licensed by Bungie. It was confirmed that NetEase had been "granted creative freedom" to develop its own concept and story for the game, increasing speculation that Bungie had "backed off" the project in prior years, to focus their efforts on Destiny 2 and Marathon. Although Rising was described as "quite early in our development phase" and a release date was not stated, registrations began immediately for a closed alpha test (featuring a "good part of the main campaign"), scheduled to begin on November 1 for the United States and Canada.

Following its initial announcement, further pre-release updates for the game came in May 2025, at NetEase's 520 Conference (livestreamed on platforms such as Bilibili), which revealed fully-voiced lines of character dialog and weapon dual-wielding. This was followed by an announcement of the game's first closed beta test for the same month.

== Release ==
In July 2025, NetEase announced Rising's release date as August 28, 2025, for both iOS and Android, alongside a new gameplay trailer, the start of a pre-registration event, and pre-loads on Google Play and the Apple App Store. Later that same month, it was confirmed that the game had surpassed five million pre-registrations and that players would receive bonus in-game items to commemorate the milestone. By August 2025, this figure had grown to 10 million.

Though described as "worldwide", the August 28 release excluded several regions, such as Austria, Belgium, Netherlands, China, Hong Kong, and Taiwan. It was accompanied by multiple in-game events, including a cross-promotion allowing players to unlock an exclusive in-game bonus for Destiny 2. NetEase also released details of the enhancements made following the beta testing period, and a roadmap showing the timing of its first and second "seasons" (September and November 2025, respectively). This was followed by its first raid (referred to as a Gauntlet), Monolith's Fall, at the start of September. On September 19, NetEase kicked-off an in-game race, whereby teams of players competed to be the first to finish the game's "Gauntlet Onslaught" mode (though the rewards were not announced simultaneously).

During Apple's livestream reveal event for the iPhone 17, the game was shown as one of the first iOS games to run at a refresh rate of 120Hz.

== Reception ==
=== Pre-release ===
During the initial alpha tests for Rising, it received praise for its presentation, effective controls (including via touchscreen), and capturing the look and feel of the Destiny series. In their preview, Jonathan LoChiatto of Destructoid noted that "it's not perfect by any means, but it's remarkable how much it feels like I'm playing Destiny on my phone. Everything a Destiny player might expect is on show and available in Destiny: Rising, from Strikes to PvP and even Raid-like challenges".

Common areas of criticism were the game's scripting and voice acting. Paul Tassi of Forbes wrote that "The worst part of the core game itself is the writing and voicework. The world does not remotely carry the same tone as the main game, not even close ... The awful script is matched only by the worse voicework ... All of this is so bad it encouraged me to play the game silently most of the time".

The game's monetization systems also received significant focus. LoChiatto called out how it contained "a sea of rare currencies, single-digit percentage reward chances, and even what appears to be several subscriptions, all aimed at getting players to fork over some dough"; however, TheGamer's Eric Switzer described these systems as "surprisingly... fair?", noting how "Rising's character pulls are not nearly as intrusive as other games, and you won't be significantly gated from any content even if you don't engage with it at all".

An area of controversy was the game's use of AI-generated voice acting, which received negative criticism from both players and professionals within the voice acting industry (during a time of SAG-AFTRA strikes related to AI replacing human actors). Although NetEase responded with a clarification that these performances were only pre-launch placeholders, some felt that the "damage" had already been caused.

=== Post-release ===
Reception

Aggregate score
Aggregator	Score
Metacritic	iOS: 76/100

The iOS version of Rising received "generally favorable" reviews according to review aggregator platform Metacritic. Common areas of praise from reviews included its gameplay and controls, the amount of content and range of activities at launch, and the extent to which it captured the essence of the Destiny franchise. In their 8 out of 10 review, Kayleigh Partleton of Pocket Tactics noted that "Destiny: Rising offers the quintessential Destiny experience that fans know and love. I immediately felt right at home".

It was felt to be more limited than mainline Destiny games in some areas with Tobi Stouffer's 4 out of 5 review in ComicBook.com describing combat as "clunky when compared to [Destiny 2], but still in a state that's wildly impressive for a mobile shooter", although Partleton commented that "the missions and exploration are just as fun as in the main games" and Tassi observed that it featured "a comical amount of things it does that seem like no-brainers for Destiny 2", some of which players "have been asking for them for ages". Some reviewers also felt that some of Rising's strengths lay within how it differed from other games in the series, with Tassi describing it as "something that will be a companion to Destiny rather than replace it, which I believe is the whole point".

Praise for Rising was more consistently positive when it was compared to other mobile games, with Tassi describing it as "actually quite good, if we're grading on the mobile game curve". Stouffer commented that "Destiny: Rising is one of the best mobile FPS games on the market, and when combined with that iconic Destiny flavor, it becomes a game that should not be skipped despite some of its downsides". Some of the cinematic events within the game also received praise, with Tassi claiming that "Destiny Rising has one of Destiny’s best campaign finales".

Reviews were more critical of the game's story. Stouffer described it as "relatively low stakes" and "hardly engaging for Destiny veterans" also voicing dissatisfaction with the game's "somewhat poor" writing and voice acting; however, Serhii Biloshytskyi of Vocal noted how the less advanced nature of the game's setting made it "stand out from the rest of the franchise" and how the more grounded nature of the storyline and script made it feel "alive in a way that Destiny's worlds sometimes struggle to capture".

The game's gacha system featured similar concerns to those stated during prior previews. In addition to monetization concerns, citicism for this system also included how it reduced the level of customization options available. Partleton called out how "I miss the freedom of creating my own character, picking my class, and having fun experimenting with subclasses", while acknowledging that "you can still find the build that works for you if you can get the right character". Tassi stated that they "actually like the entire concept of different heroes each with different abilities, differentiating itself from [Destiny 2]", but not the system through which they are acquired.

Reviewers also expressed hope in how the game would continue to expand prior to the initial launch. Stouffer concluded their review by stating that "Destiny: Rising delivers on everything it set out to be, with the potential to become something more".

=== Player counts and revenue ===
Upon release, Rising reached top place in both the App Store and Google Play charts in multiple regions. In the days following, it received triple the number of viewers on the streaming platform Twitch than series' main concurrent title, Destiny 2. Harry Alston of TheGamer also speculated that the game achieving top position within the App Store indicated a larger player count than Destiny 2 (which had experienced a significant drop in concurrent Steam players) at that point in time.

Within six days of launch, the game had achieved over 1 million iOS installs and generated an estimated US$2,000,000 in gross player spend.

== Awards and nominations ==
Year	Ceremony	Category	Result	Ref.
2025	The Game Awards	Best Mobile Game	Nominated	
