= MuMuPlayer =

Android emulator

- Developer: NetEase
- Stable release: v5.0 (2025)
- Operating system: Windows, macOS
- Platform: PC
- Type: Android emulator
- License: Freeware
- Website: www.mumuplayer.com

MuMuPlayer is a free Android emulator developed by NetEase. The software allows users to run Android applications and games on personal computers using Microsoft Windows or macOS. MuMuPlayer is paid software, sold as MuMuPlayer Pro, for macOS.

MuMuPlayer replicates the Android operating system on PCs, enabling access to mobile apps and games through desktop hardware. The software provides configuration options for display resolution, CPU and memory allocation, keyboard mapping, and supports multiple instances for simultaneous operation of different apps or games.

The emulator also has a beta version for ARM processors.

== History ==
The emulator was first introduced in 2019 as part of NetEase’s strategy to extend its mobile gaming and software ecosystem to desktop environments.

MuMuPlayer has undergone several major updates since its introduction. The 2025 release of version 5.0 introduced system-level optimizations aimed at improving stability, resource usage, and multi-instance performance. It also included an ad-free interface, GPU passthrough enhancements, and faster startup speeds.

== Developer ==
MuMuPlayer is developed and maintained by the NetEase corporate group, operating within NetEase’s gaming and software division.
