= Military strike =

Small-scale military attack

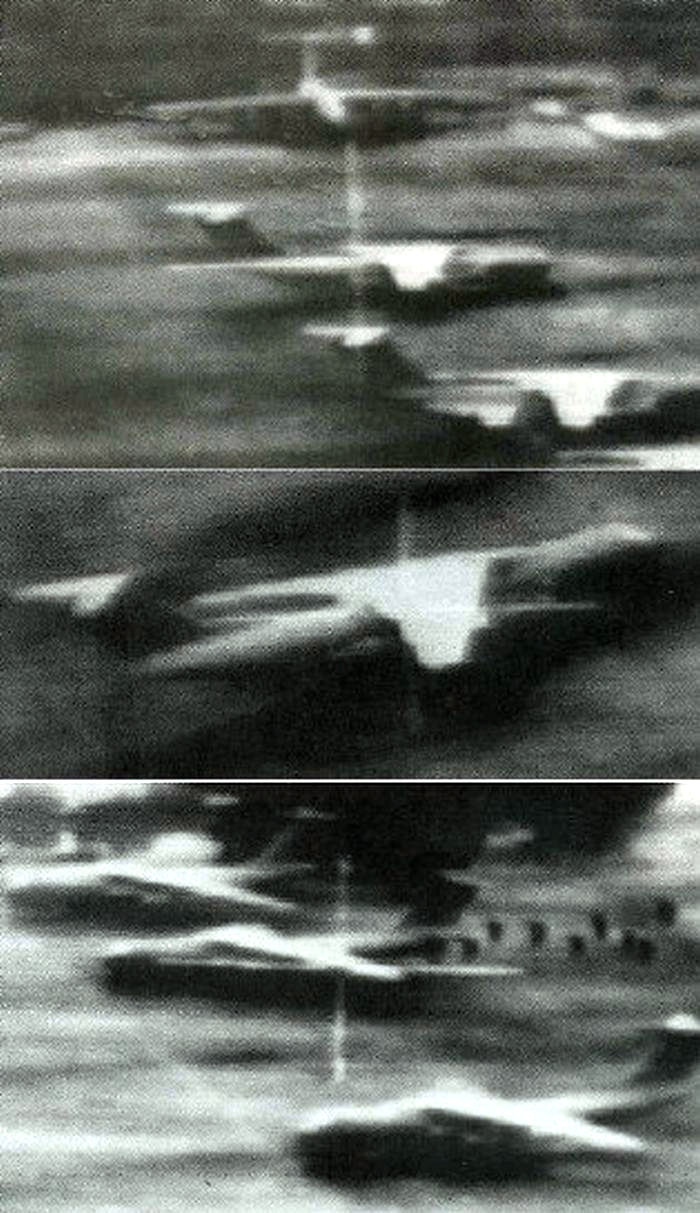
Operation El Dorado Canyon had among its goals the destruction of 3-5 Ilyushin Il-76. No regime change was sought, nor any land occupied.

In the military of the United States, strikes and raids are a group of military operations that, alongside quite a number of others, come under the formal umbrella of military operations other than war (MOOTW). What the definition of a military strike is depends on which particular branch of the military is using them. However, they do have formal, general, definitions in the United States Department of Defense's Joint Publication 1-02:

strike
An attack to damage or destroy an objective or a capability.
raid
An operation to temporarily seize an area in order to secure information, confuse an adversary, capture personnel or equipment, or to destroy a capability culminating with a planned withdrawal.

For the United States Air Force, strikes and raids are the least common types of MOOTW, there only having been eight of them in the period from 1947 to 1997, including Operation Just Cause, Operation Urgent Fury, and Operation El Dorado Canyon. For the United States Marine Corps, the latter was also a raid, and Operation Praying Mantis was a strike.

== See also ==
- Airstrike
- International sanctions
- Raid (military)
