= Lance Reddick =

American actor (1962–2023)

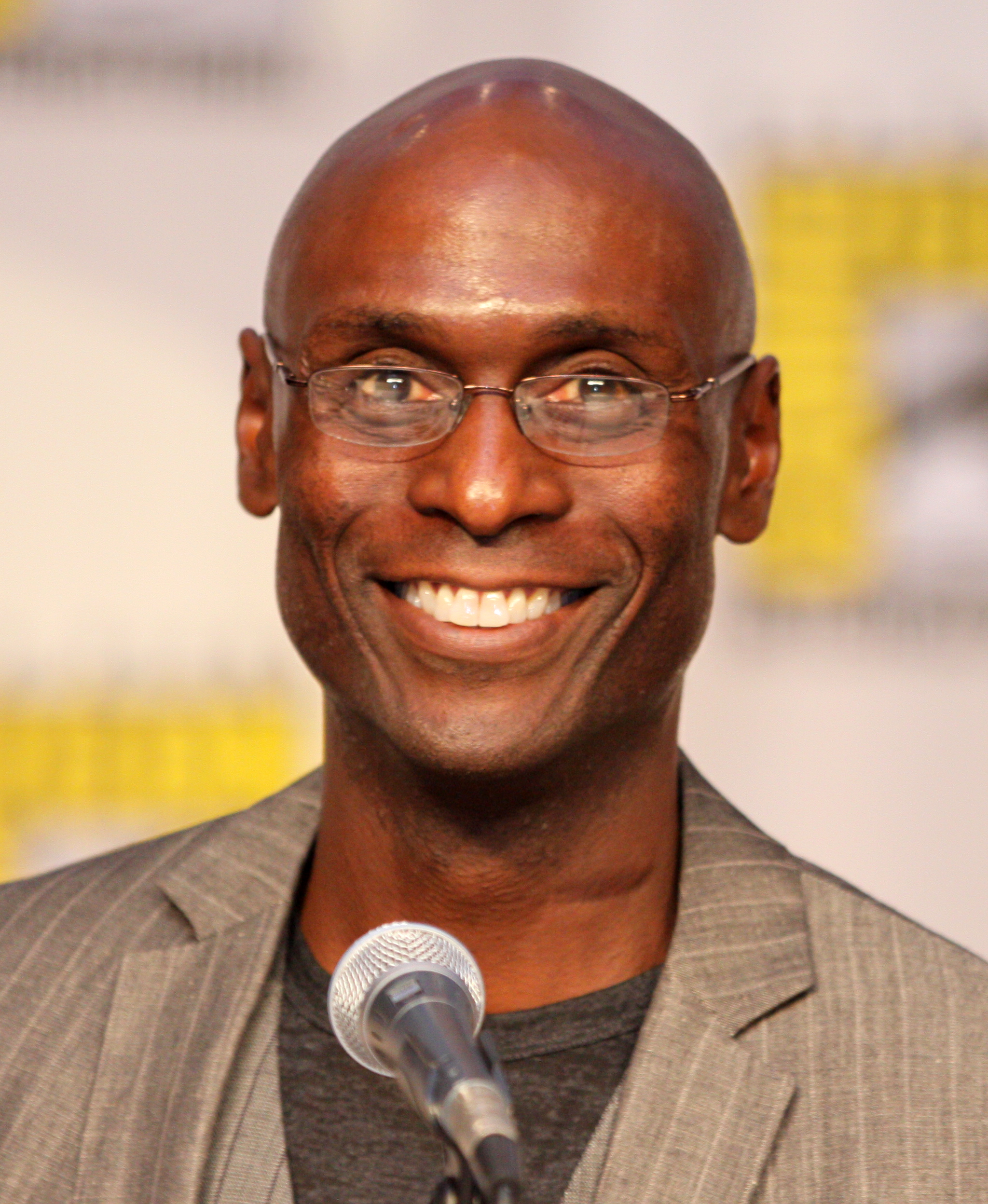
- Reddick at the 2010 San Diego Comic-Con
- Born: Lance Solomon Reddick; June 7, 1962; Baltimore, Maryland, U.S.
- Died: March 17, 2023 (aged 60); Los Angeles, California, U.S.
- Education: University of Rochester (BM); Yale University (MFA)
- Occupations: Actor; musician
- Years active: 1996–2023
- Spouses: Suzanne Yvonne Louis (m. 1986; div. 1998) Stephanie Day (m. 2011)
- Children: 2

Lance Solomon Reddick (June 7, 1962 – March 17, 2023) was an American actor. He portrayed Cedric Daniels in The Wire (2002–2008), Phillip Broyles in Fringe (2008–2013), and Chief Irvin Irving in Bosch (2014–2020). In film, he played Charon in the John Wick franchise (2014–2025) and General Caulfield in White House Down (2013).

He also portrayed Detective Johnny Basil in the fourth season of Oz, Matthew Abaddon in Lost (2004–2010), Albert Wesker and his clones in the Netflix series Resident Evil (2022), and Zeus in Percy Jackson and the Olympians (2024), the latter of which was released posthumously and earned him a Children's and Family Emmy Award for Outstanding Supporting Performer nomination. He provided the voice and likeness for video game characters Martin Hatch in Quantum Break, Sylens in Horizon Zero Dawn and Horizon Forbidden West, and Commander Zavala in the Destiny franchise.

== Early life ==
Lance Solomon Reddick was born on June 7, 1962, in Baltimore, Maryland, the son of Dorothy Gee and Solomon Reddick. He attended Friends School of Baltimore. As a teenager, he studied music at the Peabody Institute, and studied music theory and composition during a summer program at The Walden School. Reddick studied classical music composition at University of Rochester's Eastman School of Music, earning a Bachelor of Music degree. He moved to Boston, Massachusetts, in the 1980s. Reddick attended the Yale School of Drama in the early 1990s, receiving a Master of Fine Arts degree in 1994.

== Career ==
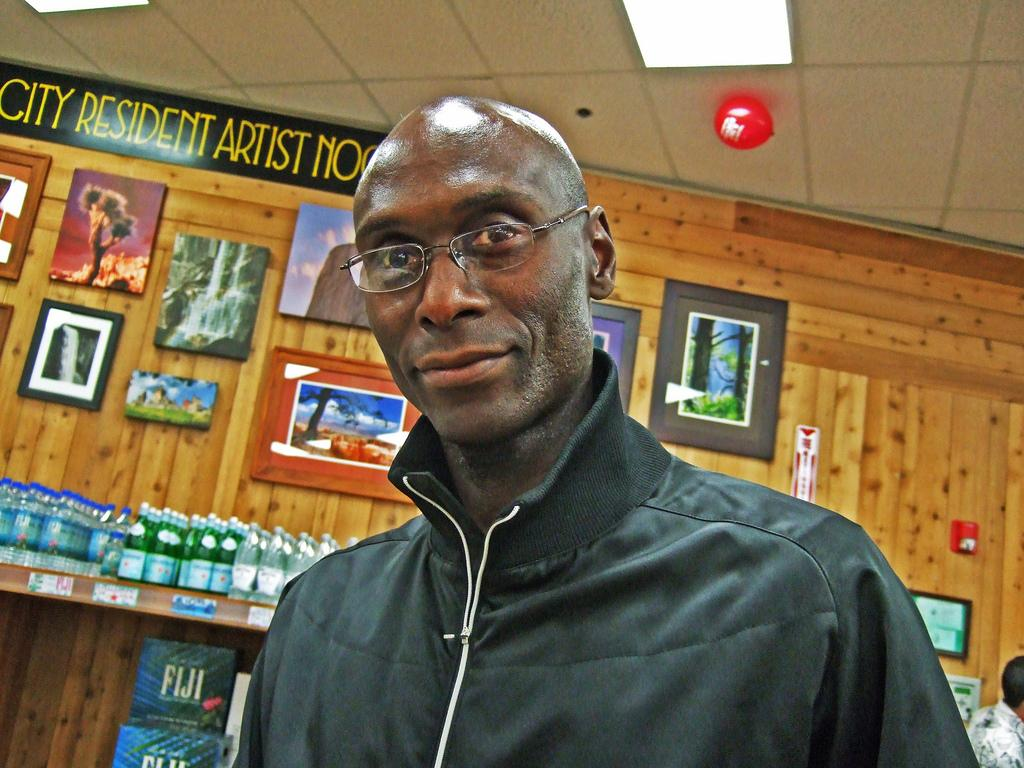
Reddick in 2008

Reddick was cast as Cedric Daniels in the HBO series The Wire, having also auditioned for the roles of Bubbles and Bunk Moreland. He joined ABC's series Lost in 2008, where he played Matthew Abaddon, an employee of Charles Widmore, in multiple episodes. He was the third of five actors from the HBO series Oz to star in the drama. Producers Damon Lindelof and Carlton Cuse considered Reddick for the role of Mr. Eko, but he was busy filming The Wire, resulting in the part going to Oz co-star Adewale Akinnuoye-Agbaje.

Reddick released his debut album Contemplations & Remembrances in 2007, and in early 2008, he was cast in a key role in the pilot of Fringe, in which his fellow Oz actor Kirk Acevedo also had a regular role. Reddick played Phillip Broyles, the head of an FBI department investigating paranormal activities. Reddick described this character as "a real hard-ass, but he's also one of the good guys." Like Lost, Fringe was co-created and produced by J. J. Abrams. There was some doubt about whether Reddick could appear in both Lost and Fringe in the 2008–2009 television season. However, Abrams stated that, even though Reddick was a series regular on Fringe, he would do episodes of Lost whenever required. Reddick appeared in the 2013 thriller White House Down. He starred in the YouTube web series DR0NE, where he was also credited as a co-producer.

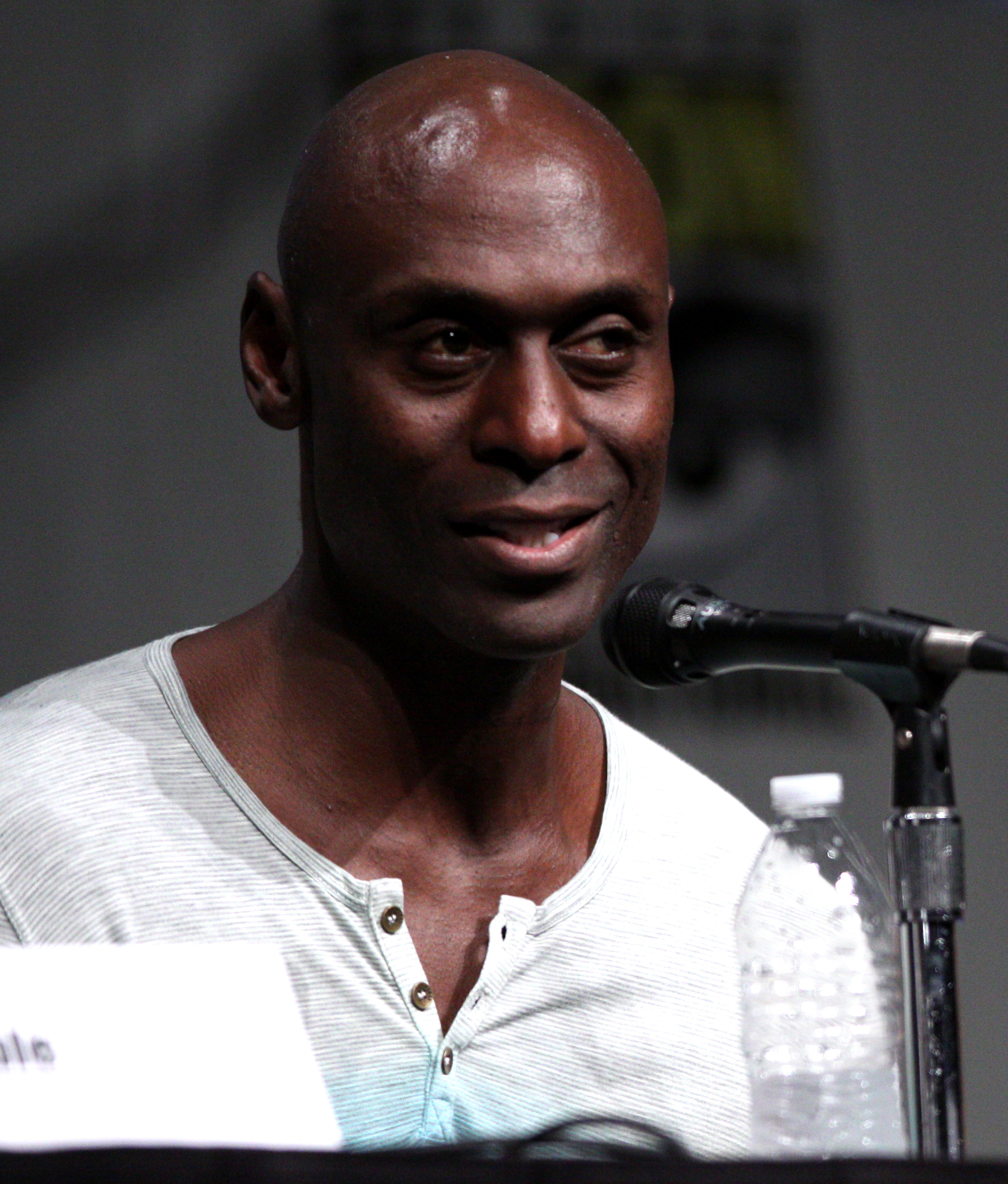
Reddick in July 2012

In 2014, Reddick appeared as Charon in the action-thriller film John Wick, a role he reprised in its three sequels. In July 2021, it was confirmed that Reddick would reprise his role in John Wick: Chapter 4.

He voiced the character Commander Zavala in the 2014 and 2017 video games Destiny and Destiny 2.

Also in 2014, he started portraying Chief Irvin Irving in the Amazon Prime series Bosch. Comparing his three large roles as police commanders, Reddick said that Daniels, his character from The Wire, is "a cop at heart", while Broyles, his Fringe character, is "a soldier", and Irving "is the quintessential politician".

Reddick was a spokesman in television commercials for Cree LED Bulbs.

In 2016, Reddick was cast in the post-apocalyptic horror film The Domestics. The film was released on June 28, 2018. Reddick later starred in the 2018 horror thriller film Monster Party. In 2019, Reddick portrayed the Secret Service director David Gentry in Angel Has Fallen. He also voiced the character Sylens in the 2017 video game Horizon Zero Dawn and reprised the role in the sequel Horizon Forbidden West. In 2021, Reddick appeared in the film Godzilla vs. Kong. In 2022, Reddick portrayed Albert Wesker and his clones Al, Bert, and Alby Wesker in the live-action Resident Evil Netflix series. He also provided the voice of Hellboy in the video game Hellboy Web of Wyrd. The game was released following his death.

He appeared posthumously as the Greek god Zeus in the series Percy Jackson and the Olympians, the Disney+ adaptation of the book series of the same name. The role of Zeus for the second season was later recast to Courtney B. Vance.

== Death ==
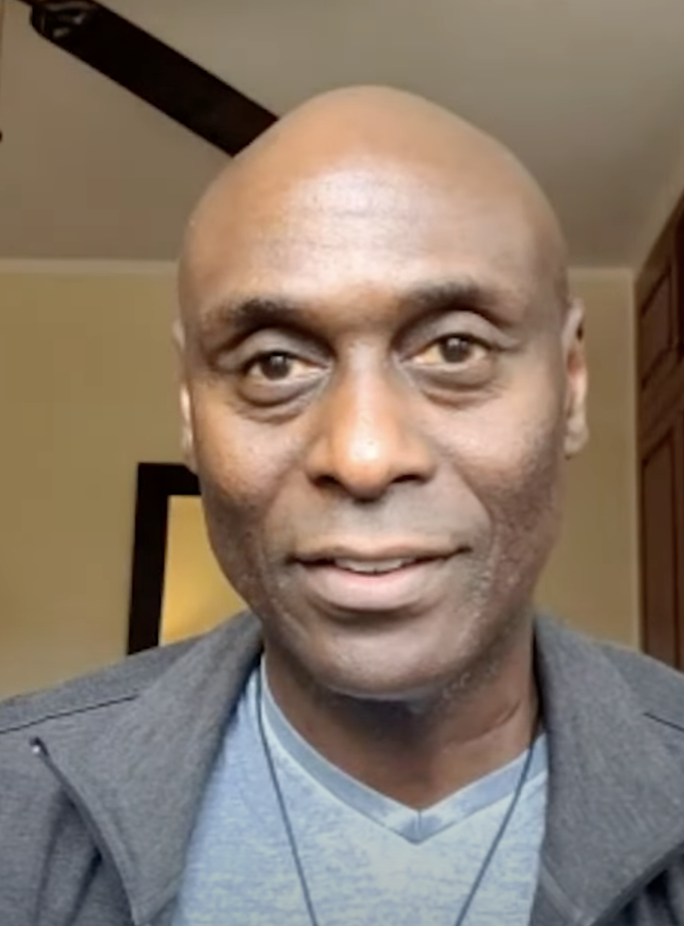
Reddick in March 2023, shortly before his death

Reddick died suddenly on March 17, 2023, aged 60, at his home in Studio City, Los Angeles, from what the coroner deemed to be coronary artery disease and atherosclerotic heart disease. (Note: Reddick's attorney has disputed the coroner's findings.) Tributes were paid by colleagues and friends, including Reddick's The Wire co-stars Wendell Pierce and Isiah Whitlock Jr., as well as creator David Simon. Reddick's John Wick co-stars Keanu Reeves and Ian McShane also paid tribute to him, as did his Horizon co-star Ashly Burch and others from the video game industry. Thousands of players in the games Destiny and Destiny 2 visited Reddick's character, Commander Zavala, standing vigil or using in-game emotes to salute him. The end credits to video game Alan Wake 2 also include a tribute to Reddick.

Reddick's family asked fans to give to MOMCares, a Baltimore nonprofit supporting Black mothers with babies in neonatal intensive care. The organization received $12,000 in donations the day after his death, the most it has received in a single day.

== Legacy ==
In January 2024, the Academy of Science Fiction, Fantasy and Horror Films announced that it had established the Lance Reddick Legacy Award for the Saturn Awards ceremony in honor of Reddick's contributions to the film industry. For the recipient, the award "symbolizes and celebrates not only a performer's talent, but their character; someone who's a true goodwill ambassador in the industry." The first inaugural winner of the award, given at the 51st Saturn Awards, was Reddick's John Wick: Chapter 4 co-star, Keanu Reeves.

The first-season finale of the Disney+ TV series Percy Jackson and the Olympians was dedicated to Reddick's memory. He played the character Zeus in one of his final posthumously released television roles. Show co-creator Rick Riordan remarked on working with Reddick, "He had a marvelous and quirky sense of humor. He was thoughtful, caring and piercingly perceptive." He stated that he hoped Reddick's scenes would "remind us of how much brilliance we have lost."

== Filmography ==
=== Film ===
Year	Title	Role	Notes	Ref.
1998	Great Expectations	Anton Le Farge		
1998	Godzilla	Soldier on Manhattan Bridge	Uncredited	
1998	The Siege	FBI Agent Floyd Rose		
2000	I Dreamed of Africa	Simon		
2001	Don't Say a Word	Arnie		
2004	Brother to Brother	James Baldwin		
2006	Dirty Work (also released as Bad City)	Derek Manning		
2008	Tennessee	Frank		
2009	The Way of War	The Black Man		
2010	Jonah Hex	Smith		
2011	Remains	Ramsey		
2012	St. Sebastian	Ives	Unreleased	
2012	Won't Back Down	Charles Alberts		
2013	White House Down	General Caulfield		
2013	Oldboy	Daniel Newcombe		
2014	Faults	Mick		
2014	The Guest	Major Carver		
2014	Search Party	Macdonaldson		
2014	John Wick	Charon O'Connor		
2015	Parallel Man: Infinite Pursuit	Atlas (voice)	Short film	
2015	Fun Size Horror	Oscar	Short film; segment: "The Collection"	
2017	John Wick: Chapter 2	Charon O'Connor		
2018	Little Woods	Officer Carter		
2018	Canal Street	Jerry Shaw		
2018	Monster Party	Milo		
2018	The Domestics	Nathan Wood		
2019	John Wick: Chapter 3 – Parabellum	Charon O'Connor		
2019	Angel Has Fallen	Secret Service Director David Gentry		
2020	Faith Based	Pastor Mike		
2020	Sylvie's Love	Herbert "Mr. Jay" Johnson		
2020	One Night in Miami...	Brother Kareem		
2021	Godzilla vs. Kong	Guillerman		
2023	John Wick: Chapter 4	Charon O'Connor	Posthumous release	
2023	White Men Can't Jump	Benji Allen	Posthumous release	
2023	The Caine Mutiny Court-Martial	Captain Luther Blakely	Posthumous release	
2024	Shirley	Wesley MacDonald "Mac" Holder	Posthumous release	
2025	Ballerina	Charon O'Connor	Posthumous release; final film role	

=== Television ===
Year	Title	Role	Notes	Ref.
1996	New York Undercover	Oscar Griffin	Episode: "The Enforcers"	
1996	Swift Justice	Jim Stark	Episode: "Bad Medicine"	
1997	The Nanny	Stage Hand	Episode: "Fair Weather Fran"	
1997	What the Deaf Man Heard	George Thacker	Television film	
1998	The Fixer	Tyrell Holmes	Television film	
1998	Witness to the Mob	Foreman Trial #2	Television film	
1999	The West Wing	DC Police Officer	Episode: "In Excelsis Deo"	
2000	The Corner	Marvin	Mini series	
2000–2001	Oz	Johnny Basil	Recurring role	
2000–2001	Law & Order: Special Victims Unit	Dr. Taylor	Recurring role	
2001	Law & Order	Captain Gasana	Episode: "Soldier of Fortune"	
2002	Keep the Faith, Baby	J. Raymond Jones	Television film	
2002–2008	The Wire	Cedric Daniels	Main role	
2003	Law & Order: Criminal Intent	Jack Bernard	Episode: "Probability"	
2004	Law & Order	FBI Special Agent Jamal Atkinson	Episode: "City Hall"	
2005	Independent Lens	James	Episode: "Brother to Brother"	
2005–2006	CSI: Miami	FBI Agent David Park	3 episodes	
2007	Numb3rs	Lieutenant Steve Davidson	Episode: "End of Watch"	
2008–2009	Lost	Matthew Abaddon	4 episodes	
2008–2013	Fringe	Phillip Broyles	Main role	
2010	Svetlana	Lance	Episode: "Snatchengil for the Stars"	
2011	It's Always Sunny in Philadelphia	Reggie	Episode: "Frank's Brother"	
2012	The Avengers: Earth's Mightiest Heroes	Falcon (voice)	2 episodes	
2012–2013	Tron: Uprising	Cutler (voice)	3 episodes	
2013	Wilfred	Dr. Blum	Episode: "Perspective"	
2013	NTSF:SD:SUV::	Todd Broger	Episode: "TGI Murder"	
2013	Comedy Bang! Bang!	Angelfire	Episode: "Andy Samberg Wears A Plaid Shirt And Glasses"	
2013	The Eric Andre Show	Himself	Episode: "Lance Reddick; Harry Shum Jr."	
2014	American Horror Story: Coven	Papa Legba	Recurring role; 3 episodes	
2014	Beware the Batman	Ra's al Ghul (voice)	3 episodes	
2014	Intelligence	DCI Jeffrey Tetazoo	Recurring role; 5 episodes	
2014	The Blacklist	The Cowboy	2 episodes	
2014	Key & Peele	Johnson Family Member	Episode: "Gay Wedding Advice"	
2014–2021	Bosch	Deputy Chief Irvin Irving	Main role	
2015	Castle	Keith Kaufman	Episode: "Hollander's Woods"	
2015	Tim & Eric's Bedtime Stories	Joseph Zagen	Episode: "Tornado"	
2016	Mary + Jane	David	Episode: "Rehab"	
2017	Rick and Morty	Alan Rails (voice)	Episode: "Vindicators 3: The Return of Worldender"	
2018–2020	Corporate	Christian DeVille	Recurring role	
2018	American Horror Story: Apocalypse	Papa Legba	Episode: "Traitor"	
2019	DuckTales	General Lunaris (voice)	Recurring role	
2020	Castlevania	The Captain (voice)	2 episodes	
2020–2022	Paradise PD	Agent Clappers (voice)	Recurring role	
2020	Through the Eye of the Needle	Narrator	Dust short story special episode	
2021	America's Book of Secrets	Narrator	Main role (season 4)	
2021	Young Sheldon	Professor Boucher	Episode: "An Introduction to Engineering and a Glob of Hair Gel"	
2022	Resident Evil	Albert Wesker / Al Wesker / Bert Wesker / Alby Wesker	Main role	
2022	Farzar	Renzo / Agent Clappers (voices)	Main role	
2023–2024	The Legend of Vox Machina	Thordak (voice)	Recurring role (season 2–3); posthumous release of season 3	
2023	Invincible	Steven Erickson (voice)	Episode: "Atom Eve"; posthumous release	
2023	Bosch: Legacy	Irvin Irving	Episode: "A Step Ahead"; posthumous release	
2024	Percy Jackson and the Olympians	Zeus	Episode: "The Prophecy Comes True"; posthumous release	
2024	Kite Man: Hell Yeah!	Lex Luthor (voice)	Recurring role, 4 episodes; posthumous release	

=== Video games ===
Year	Title	Voice role	Notes	Ref.
2009	50 Cent: Blood on the Sand	Derek Carter		
2014	Destiny	Commander Zavala		
2015	Destiny: The Taken King	Commander Zavala		
2016	Quantum Break	Martin Hatch	Also motion capture and full-motion video footage	
2016	Destiny: Rise of Iron	Commander Zavala		
2017	Payday 2	Charon		
2017	Horizon Zero Dawn	Sylens		
2017	Destiny 2	Commander Zavala		
2018	Destiny 2: Warmind	Commander Zavala		
2018	Destiny 2: Forsaken	Commander Zavala		
2019	Destiny 2: Shadowkeep	Commander Zavala		
2019	John Wick Hex	Charon		
2020	Destiny 2: Beyond Light	Commander Zavala		
2022	Horizon Forbidden West	Sylens	Burning Shores expansion released posthumously in April 2023	
2022	Destiny 2: The Witch Queen	Commander Zavala		
2023	Destiny 2: Lightfall	Commander Zavala		
2023	Hellboy Web of Wyrd	Hellboy	Posthumous release	

== Awards and nominations ==
- Nominated for a Saturn Award for Best Supporting Actor on Television, Fringe (2010)
- Nominated for a Saturn Award for Best Guest Starring Role on Television, Fringe (2012)
- Nominated for a Saturn Award for Best Supporting Actor on Television, Bosch (2015)

== Discography ==
- 2007: Contemplations & Remembrances. Christai Productions
