= Hellboy Web of Wyrd =

2023 video game

- Developer: Upstream Arcade
- Publishers: Good Shepherd Entertainment (2023-2025); Big Fan Games (2025-)
- Producers: Hannah Bradley; Annette Cottell
- Programmer: Jon Askew
- Artists: Stevie Brown; Lauren Clair; Francesca Ross
- Writer: Dene Carter
- Engine: Unity Engine
- Platforms: Nintendo Switch; PlayStation 4; PlayStation 5; Windows; Xbox One; Xbox Series X/S
- Release: 18 October 2023
- Genres: Beat 'em up, roguelike
- Mode: Single-player

Hellboy Web of Wyrd is a beat 'em up roguelike game developed by British studio Upstream Arcade and originally published by Good Shepherd Entertainment. The game was released for Nintendo Switch, PlayStation 4, PlayStation 5, Windows, Xbox One, and Xbox Series X/S on 18 October 2023. It received mixed reviews from critics.

== Gameplay ==
Hellboy Web of Wyrd is a third-person beat 'em up with elements from roguelike games, such as having large open areas that the player can explore at will. Combat mechanics focus on Hellboy mixing physical attacks with ranged attacks to create combos. Both Hellboy and other enemies in the game are protected by "Toughness", which is a recharging buffer that temporarily shields them from permanent damage. If Hellboy takes too much damage, he can unleash a special attack named "Payback", allowing him to inflict devastating damage on nearby enemies.

In the game, Hellboy (voiced by both Lance Reddick and Amuche Chukudebelu) must venture to the "Butterfly House", an ancient ruin that guards the entrance to an alternate dimension known as "The Wyrd", to locate a BPRD agent who is missing in action. While the Butterfly House serves as a hub area for the player, levels in the game are procedurally generated.

== Development ==
Hellboy Web of Wyrd is an original game based on Dark Horse Comics' titular comic series. It was revealed at The Game Awards 2022, and has a hand drawn style that replicates Mike Mignola's art. British studio Upstream Arcade collaborated closely with Mignola when working on the game's narrative. It is also one of Lance Reddick's final posthumous roles. The game was released worldwide for Nintendo Switch, PlayStation 5, Windows, Xbox One, and Xbox Series X/S on 18 October 2023.

In 2025, the game's publishing rights was switched to Big Fan Games, a label of Good Shepherd Entertainment's parent company Devolver Digital focused on licensed games.

== Reception ==
Hellboy Web of Wyrd received "mixed or average" reviews from critics, according to review aggregator website Metacritic. Metacritic listed the PlayStation 5 version the seventh worst game of 2023.

Mitchell Demorest from PCGamesN praised its art direction and voice actors' performances but criticized the combat system for being too basic for a roguelike video game. Ken Talbot from Push Square said that it "is created by people with a reverence for Mignola's work", stating the achievement to translate the visual style to a 3D environment.

Yahtzee Croshaw gave the game a scathing review in his series Zero Punctuation; however, the review was released with the game's title and identifying elements redacted from the review, as the game's press embargo date was pushed back last minute, and Croshaw didn't have any time to replace it with a different game. He'd confirm the "mystery game" in the review being Hellboy Web of Wyrd a few weeks later during a livestream, and later on he placed it as the third-worst game of 2023 in Fully Ramblomatic's Best, Worst and Blandest of 2023.
