= Commander Zavala =

Character in the Destiny video game series

- Destiny character
- Zavala as he appears in Destiny 2
- First appearance: Destiny (2014)
- Created by: Bungie
- Voiced by: Lance Reddick (2014–2023); Keith David

In-universe information
- Species: Awoken
- Affiliation: Vanguard

Commander Zavala is a character in Bungie's Destiny video game series. Introduced in the 2014 video game Destiny, he is the commander of the Vanguard, an organization that directs and leads the player-controlled Guardians in defence of humanity's Last City. He initially served primarily as a mission coordinator for players and was characterized through his position as the moral and military leader of the Vanguard.

Zavala became increasingly central to the continuing series narrative beginning with Destiny 2. His story explores the themes of military leadership, institutional responsibility, faith, reconciliation with former enemies, and grief caused by personal and collective losses. The character's refusal to pursue revenge after the death of Cayde-6, a key character in the universe of Destiny, generated conflict between his personal loyalties and his duties as commander. Subsequent stories increasingly placed Zavala in situations that could not be resolved through military force. Season of the Haunted in particular shifted the emphasis from Zavala's institutional role to the psychological cost of sustaining it.

Zavala was voiced by actor Lance Reddick from his introduction until Reddick's death in March 2023. Besides his role as a performer in a live-service game, Reddick became actively involved with the Destiny player community up until 2023. Following Reddick's death, players gathered around Zavala's location in Destiny 2 to hold in-game vigils, closely connecting the public legacies of the actor and character. Keith David assumed the role beginning with the 2024 expansion The Final Shape, while Reddick's previously recorded dialogue remained in the game. Contemporary coverage frequently framed David's appointment through his previous association with Bungie, while emphasizing Bungie's decision to preserve Reddick's existing performances in-game.

Critics have discussed Zavala both as an extension of and a contrast with the authority figures Reddick portrayed in film and television, as well as his story arc's exploration of suppressed grief, crisis of faith and emotional development. Later commentary focused on Reddick's occupying overlapping roles as Zavala's performer and an active member of the Destiny community, as well as his successor David's handling of the transition between performers for the character.

== Development and portrayal ==
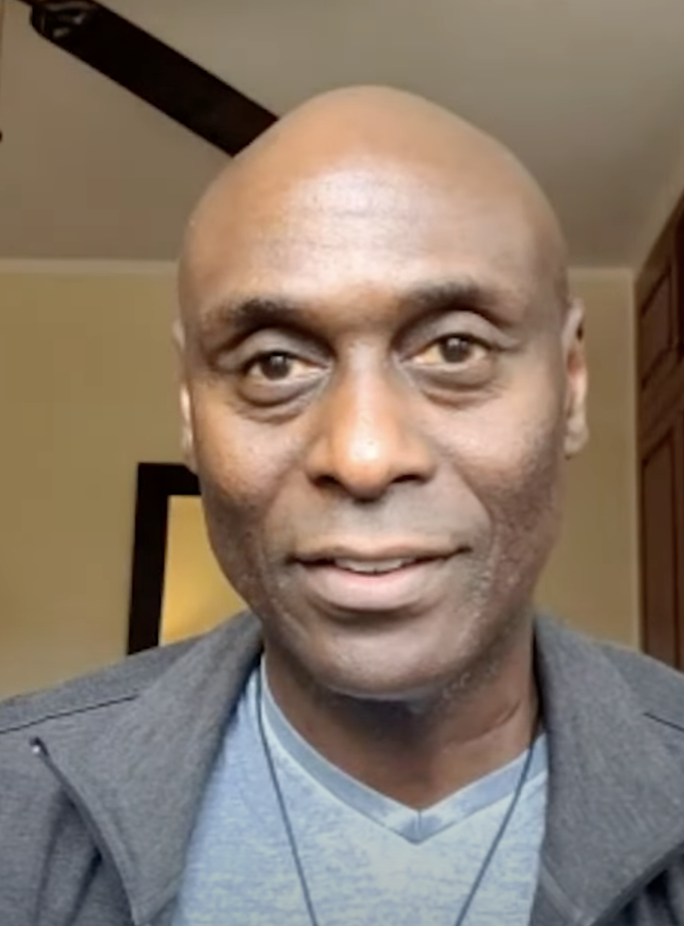
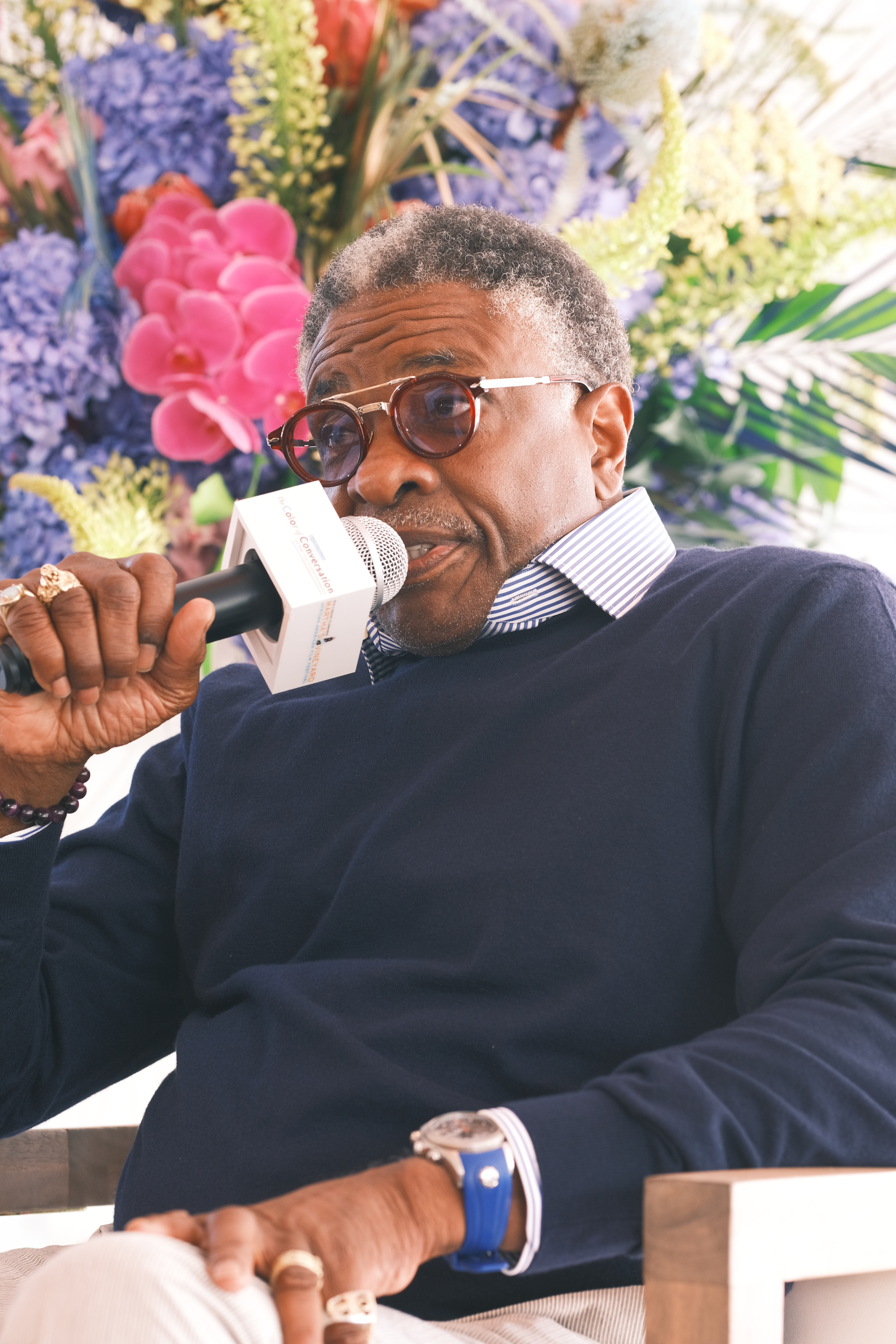
Zavala's voice actors, Lance Reddick (left) and Keith David (right).

Lance Reddick voiced Zavala from the original Destiny through material recorded before his death in March 2023. Reddick said that he was initially drawn to the project by its apparent scale and the number of established actors involved, although he first regarded it as another voice-acting assignment. He did not anticipate either the size of the game's audience or the extent to which he would become associated with its community.

Reddick distinguished Zavala from several of his other genre roles through the character's elevated and formal manner of speaking, describing his approach as more "straight Shakespearean". Reddick became publicly engaged with the Destiny player community and played the game himself, although he chose a Warlock rather than the Titan class represented by Zavala. In a 2022 interview with Reddick and game director Joe Blackburn, Blackburn described Reddick as both a prominent member of the game's fictional cast and an active participant in its community. Blackburn said that Reddick's dramatic range gave Bungie flexibility when considering Zavala's future development.

In addition to voicing Zavala and becoming a Destiny player himself, Reddick also shared gameplay footage with fans, and occasionally performed community-created dialogue in character, contributing to the close association between the actor and Zavala. Reddick continued recording dialogue for Destiny 2 until shortly before his death in March 2023. During Season of the Deep, Bungie narrative designer Robert Brookes revealed that a HELM radio conversation between Zavala and Sloane represented the final dialogue he had recorded with Reddick. Brookes described the exchange, which concerns acceptance and growth, as a particularly fitting conclusion to their work together.

Bungie initially continued to use dialogue Reddick had already recorded. In August 2023, the studio announced that Keith David, known for his previous association with the studio as the voice of the Arbiter in the Halo media franchise, would assume the role in The Final Shape and subsequent material. Bungie stated that Reddick's existing dialogue would remain unchanged, rather than being retrospectively re-recorded. David said that he intended to preserve the integrity Reddick had brought to Zavala.

== Appearances ==
Zavala first appears in Destiny as the Titan representative of the Vanguard, alongside Hunter Vanguard Cayde-6 and Warlock Vanguard Ikora Rey. From the Tower overlooking the Last City, he assigns military operations to the player-controlled Guardian and coordinates strikes against humanity's enemies. In Destiny 2, the Cabal Red Legion attacks the City and severs the Guardians' connection to the Traveler, depriving them of their supernatural Light. Zavala retreats to Titan, where he attempts to regroup the surviving Guardians before joining the campaign to reclaim the City.

After Cayde is murdered during the events of Forsaken, Zavala refuses Ikora's proposal to mobilize the Guardians against the Awoken Reef. He considers the protection of the City more important than a campaign of personal revenge, leaving the player to pursue Cayde's killer, Uldren Sov, independently. Later storylines show Zavala becoming more willing to negotiate with former enemies. During the Season of the Chosen, he rejects Caiatl's demand that humanity submit to the Cabal but agrees to settle their conflict through Cabal ritual combat. The two leaders subsequently establish an armistice. Zavala also accepts the resurrected Uldren, now known as the Crow, after he was saved by him from an assassination attempt.

In The Witch Queen, Zavala's confidence in the Traveler is shaken when the Hive acquire the Light, which the Vanguard had regarded as evidence of their own moral and spiritual legitimacy. The subsequent Season of the Haunted reveals that, centuries earlier, Zavala had married a mortal woman named Safiyah and adopted her son, Hakim. Hakim's death during a raid ended the family, and Zavala continued to blame himself long after Safiyah's eventual death. A supernatural manifestation of Safiyah exploits his guilt, but Zavala ultimately accepts that his grief cannot be resolved through punishment or denial.

In The Final Shape, Zavala enters the Traveler with the other members of the Vanguard to confront the Witness. The Witness exploits his grief and crisis of faith by offering to restore Safiyah and Hakim. Zavala's Ghost, Targe, is destroyed while protecting him, leaving Zavala mortal and unable to use the Light. He nevertheless continues the campaign and later acquires powers associated with Darkness. In the 2026 Monuments of Triumph update, Zavala retires after losing both Targe and his immortality, transferring leadership of the Vanguard to Ikora.

== Reception and legacy ==
Critical discussion of Zavala has frequently centred on the relationship between his characterization and the performance by the character's voice actors. Ash Parrish of Kotaku connected the authority of Reddick's performance with his portrayal of police lieutenant Cedric Daniels in The Wire. Parrish felt that character allowed Reddick to portray an uncompromised version of the principled leader Daniels had struggled to become; Reddick brought dignity to the role, which enabled her to regard Zavala as an unusually sincere representation of moral authority. She interpreted Zavala's severity as protective rather than authoritarian, describing him as both the literal and figurative shield of the Guardians under his command. Coverage of Reddick's engagement with the fan community in an unofficial capacity was generally positive; in 2021, Reddick recorded an extended monologue written by players in response to a scene in which Zavala curtly rejected a demand from the Cabal empress Caiatl, with Ethan Gach from Kotaku noting that the effectiveness of the humorous recording depended on the contrast between the exaggerated speech and Reddick's normally restrained delivery.

The transition to David was also received as part of Zavala's character development rather than solely as a production change. Ryan Gilliam of Polygon described the replacement as particularly difficult because Reddick's voice had become integral to Zavala's identity over nearly a decade. Gilliam observed that David initially remained close to Reddick's established combination of sternness and warmth, before giving a more individual and emotionally volatile performance as Zavala became increasingly destabilized during The Final Shape. He considered the difference between the two voices compatible with the changes occurring within the character, rather than an interruption to the story. Gilliam concluded that David successfully preserved the recognizable qualities of Reddick's portrayal while expressing the anger and desperation required by Zavala's later storyline. Andy Chalk of PC Gamer similarly wrote that David's performance was sufficiently close to provide continuity without becoming an imitation of Reddick. He characterized the result as a recognizable but distinct version of Zavala and noted that early reactions from players were broadly positive.

Following Reddick's death on March 17, 2023, players assembled around Zavala's usual position in the Tower. They used kneeling, saluting and other in-game gestures to create informal vigils, while additional tributes included fan artwork and quotations associated with the character. Levi Winslow of Kotaku wrote that Zavala had developed from a comparatively reserved mission vendor into one of the series' more emotionally defined figures, making the character a natural focus for the community's response to Reddick's death. PC Gamer similarly described Zavala as a paternal figure within the Tower and attributed the intensity of the memorial response to Reddick's engagement with the game's players.

Reviewing Zavala's retirement in 2026, Rory Norris of PC Gamer considered the scene an effective conclusion to the burden the character had carried throughout the series. Norris found Zavala's departure particularly affecting because the loss of his Ghost and eventual mortality paralleled the audience's awareness of Reddick's death.

=== Analysis ===
Phil Hornshaw of GameSpot identified Zavala's willingness to negotiate with Caiatl as part of a broader improvement in Destiny 2's storytelling. Hornshaw wrote that the character was beginning to recognize diplomacy and coexistence as alternatives to an endless cycle of war. Hornshaw described the storyline as the most extensive exploration of the character's interior life to that point. Although Zavala had long been presented as the Vanguard's stoic and dependable leader, the season revealed that his composure depended partly on suppressing his grief over Hakim and Safiyah. His belief that every loss under his protection represented a personal failure contributed to his survivor guilt and inability to forgive himself. Hornshaw connected Zavala's story with Bungie's broader attempt to depict trauma as something that cannot be overcome solely through individual strength or heroic action. Zavala progresses only after receiving support and accepting that continuing to grieve does not constitute a failure of leadership. Gilliam interpreted the character's breakdown during The Final Shape as the culmination of several years of losses and challenges to his faith, rather than a sudden departure from his established personality. Zavala's growing emotional instability also provided the narrative context for David's more forceful and exposed performance.

Media scholars Bjarke Alexander Larsen and Elin Carstensdottir considered Reddick's death significant to players not only as the loss of the character's distinctive voice, but also as the loss of a prominent fellow player and community member. Drawing on a 32-month ethnographic study of the Destiny community, Larsen and Carstensdottir analysed the vigils as a disruption of players' ordinary gameplay rituals. They observed that players gathered around Zavala using commemorative emotes, streamers held extended periods of silence or organised gatherings, players adopted a common emblem in Reddick's honour, and Bungie developers shared their memories of him. The researchers interpreted the response as a moment in which storytelling, community and game development intersected, demonstrating the community's ability to rally around a shared event despite widespread dissatisfaction with the game following Lightfall.
