= Destiny (video game) =

2014 video game

- Box art featuring the game's three character classes: Warlock (left), Hunter (center), and Titan (right)
- Developer: Bungie (Note: Additional development by Radical Entertainment and High Moon Studios)
- Publishers: Activision (2014–2018); Bungie (2019–current)
- Director: Jason Jones
- Producer: Jonty Barnes
- Designers: Lars Bakken; Del Chafe III; Liz M.E. Chung; Tyson Green; Ken Malcolm; Sage Merrill; Christopher Opdahl; Alex Pfeiffer; Luke Smith; James Tsai
- Programmers: Chris Butcher; Ben Wallace; Zach Russell
- Artists: Christopher Barrett; David Dunn
- Writers: Clay Carmouche; Seth Dickinson; Jonathan Goff; Robt McLees; Dave Mongan; Joshua Rubin; Lily Yu; Lucy Prebble; Felix Gilman
- Composers: Michael Salvatori; C Paul Johnson; Martin O'Donnell; Paul McCartney
- Series: Destiny
- Platforms: PlayStation 3; PlayStation 4; Xbox 360; Xbox One
- Release: September 9, 2014
- Genre: First-person shooter
- Mode: Multiplayer

Destiny is an online first-person shooter video game developed by Bungie. It was released worldwide on September 9, 2014, for the PlayStation 3, PlayStation 4, Xbox 360, and Xbox One consoles. Destiny marked Bungie's first new console franchise since the Halo series, and it was the first game in a 10-year agreement between Bungie and Activision. Set in a "mythological science fiction" world, the game features a multiplayer "shared-world" environment with elements of role-playing games. Activities in Destiny are divided among player versus environment (PvE) and player versus player (PvP) game types. In addition to normal story missions, PvE features three-player "strikes" and six-player raids. A free roam patrol mode is also available for each destination which feature public events. PvP features objective-based modes, as well as traditional deathmatch game modes.

Players take on the role of a Guardian, protectors of Earth's last safe city as they wield a power called Light to protect the city from different alien races. Guardians are tasked with reviving a celestial being called the Traveler, while journeying to different planets to investigate and destroy the alien threats before humanity is completely wiped out. Bungie released four expansion packs, furthering the story, and adding new content, missions, and new PvP modes. Year One of Destiny featured two small expansions, The Dark Below in December 2014 and House of Wolves in May 2015. A third, larger expansion, The Taken King, was released in September 2015 and marked the beginning of Year Two, changing much of the core gameplay. The base game and the first three expansions were packaged into Destiny: The Taken King Legendary Edition. Another large expansion called Rise of Iron was released in September 2016. The base game and all four expansions were packaged into Destiny: The Collection.

The game was originally published by Activision, though Bungie now self-publishes the game after separating from Activision in 2019. Upon its release, Destiny received generally positive reviews, with praise for its gameplay, graphics, and for maintaining lineage from the Halo franchise, particularly in regard to its competitive experiences. Criticism centered mostly around the game's storyline, post-campaign content, and emphasis on grinding. It sold over US$325 million at retail in its first five days, making it the biggest new franchise launch of all time. It is often cited as a pioneer of the live-service genre. It was GamesRadar's 2014 Game of the Year, received the BAFTA Award for Best Game at the 2014 British Academy Video Games Awards and has been frequently cited as one of the greatest video games ever made. A sequel, Destiny 2, was released in September 2017 and continued active development until June 2026, which at the time brought an end to the mainline series, but in September 2026, Bungie revealed its plans to return to the series. A mobile game was also released in August 2025 called Destiny: Rising, a prequel taking place in an alternate timeline.

== Gameplay ==
Destiny gameplay

Destiny's style has been described as a first-person shooter that incorporates role-playing and MMO elements, but Bungie has avoided describing Destiny as a traditional MMO game. Instead, the game has been referred to as a "shared-world shooter", as it lacks many of the characteristics of a traditional MMO game. For instance, rather than players being able to communicate with all other players in the game or on a particular server — as is the case in many conventional MMO games — Destiny includes on-the-fly matchmaking that allows players to communicate only with other players with whom they are "matched" by the game. To communicate with other players in the game world, players must use their respective console's messaging system. Time-limited events and modes are also occasionally added or featured in-game.

Activities in Destiny are divided among player versus environment (PvE) and player versus player (PvP) game types across the Cosmodrome and the Plaguelands (added with Rise of Iron) on Earth, the Moon, Venus, and Mars. The Iron Banner is another PvP event that allows guardians to get high tier loot from playing these competitive multiplayer matches only available during exclusive windows of time and completing bounties. There are also PvP maps for Mars's moon Phobos and the planet Mercury. A social space on Mercury was added with the House of Wolves expansion, but requires players to go undefeated in the Trials of Osiris Crucible mode in order to access it. Another PvE area, a massive ship called the Dreadnaught that is situated in the rings of Saturn, and two PvE missions on Phobos were added with The Taken King expansion.

The player's artificial intelligence companion, Ghost, resurrects the player-controlled Guardian from death at the start of the game. Ghost facilitates the game's respawn mechanic by enabling the player character to continually return from death.

=== Character progression and classes ===
Players are able to improve their characters, referred to as Guardians, by gaining experience points (XP) — when a set number of experience points are accumulated, the player's character will "level up" and gain improved statistics which further enhance performance in battle. Quests, including the "main scenario" quest line, are specific tasks given to the player by non-player characters which reward items and XP. Completing main scenario quests progresses the overarching plot of the game.

Destiny features three character classes. Each class has their own specific upgrades, perks, special abilities, and three sub-classes that allow the player to finely tune their individual characters to provide a different play style. After choosing a class, players select one of three species for their character: Human, Awoken (bluish-gray-skinned descendants of Humans), or Exo (human consciousness in a machine). They can then customize their character, such as changing its gender or skin color. A character's species is only cosmetic and does not affect gameplay. Players can create two more characters to have a character of each class. The Taken King added a third sub-class for each class, but requires the purchase of the DLC to access the new sub-classes.

- Hunters are based on a bounty hunter and focus on agility and mobility. Its Solar-based "Gunslinger" sub-class tree includes stat boosts that award accurate play, a throwing knife attack, the ability to upgrade to a triple jump, and the "Golden Gun" super, a very powerful, flaming magnum with a base magazine of three shots. The Arc-based "Bladedancer" sub-class has a heavier focus on close combat, offering an extended-range "Blink Strike", and an "Arc Blade" super (which allows the player to quickly dart between and kill enemies) with a temporary invisibility option. The Taken King added the Void-based "Nightstalker" sub-class that includes a bow-like super called "Shadowshot" that tethers enemies together, limiting movement and preventing enemies from using abilities for a short time. It can also be used to do stealth attacks or blind enemies for a brief time.
- Warlocks are based on a space magician and focus on offensive abilities, recovery, and melee attacks that can reduce the cooldown time of its abilities. Its super in the "Voidwalker" sub-class, "Nova Bomb", is an explosively powerful sphere of Void energy capable of being thrown in different ways. Its "Sunsinger" sub-class features abilities based around the Solar element, with the "Radiance" super allowing the player to temporarily improve their statistics, or revive themselves if killed. The Taken King added the Arc-based "Stormcaller" sub-class that includes the super "Stormtrance", which produces lightning bolts that chains between enemies.
- Titans are based on a Space Gladiator or "tanks", and focus on heavy damage and tough resistance. The Titan's super in the Arc-based "Striker" sub-class, "Fist of Havoc", is a ground slamming attack that destroys all enemies in its radius. Its Void-based "Defender" sub-class offers the ability to generate a shield with its "Ward of Dawn" super. The shield can also provide temporary stat bonuses to other players that step within it. The Taken King added the "Sunbreaker" sub-class, which features a Solar-based super, the "Hammer of Sol", creating a flaming hammer that can be thrown at enemies, or used for close-quarters combat.

Upon reaching the character level cap, character progression shifts to improving their "Light" level by acquiring new and better equipment. This equipment can be gained through a variety of sources, including "strikes", raids, and in-game events. Prior to The Taken King, all legendary and exotic armor, and some rare, contained an attribute called Light. Once players reached level 20, they no longer earned experience to level up; XP earned after level 20 went towards upgrading weapons and armor, and creating Motes of Light, an in-game currency. Players could only go beyond level 20 by obtaining armor with Light, and these levels were referred to as Light levels. The initial Light level cap was 30, which increased to 32 with The Dark Below and 34 with the House of Wolves. Update patch 2.0, released in preparation for The Taken King, made the character's experience level and Light level separate: level 34 is now the experience level cap for all players; level 40 for players who own The Taken King and Rise of Iron. A higher character level allows for better equipment to be equipped. A character's Light level is now an average of the attack and defense of all equipped gear. For example, if all equipped gear has 170 Light each, the character's Light level will be 170. A higher Light level improves damage output and defense. The highest obtainable Light level was 320 for players who owned The Taken King; the expansion's April Update increased it to 335. Rise of Iron increased the highest obtainable Light level to 400.

Players' equipment includes weapons and armor. Legendary and exotic items are the best items for players' characters, and only one exotic weapon and one exotic armor (excluding exotic class items) can be equipped at one time. There are several different classes of weapons that are categorized as either a primary, special (secondary), or heavy weapon. Several weapons have an elemental damage type. There is Arc (blue), Solar (orange), and Void (purple). All damage types will deplete enemy shields of that type faster, and the weapon will also do extra damage to enemies if the gameplay modifiers 'Arc Burn', 'Solar Burn' or 'Void Burn' are active. The original maximum attack damage for legendary and exotic weapons was 300. This increased to 331 with The Dark Below and 365 with the House of Wolves. Because of the change to the Light level system, The Taken King numerically changed weapons of 365 damage to 170, but with no loss in damage output (365 damage of Year 1 equals 170 damage of Year 2). As with armor, weapons' attack damage contributes to the Light level and all gear can be infused to increase their numbers.

There are six armor slots: helmet, gauntlets, chest, legs, class item, and artifact (artifacts were added with The Taken King). Each class has armor specific to them with exotic armor that complement a character's sub-class. Each piece of armor increases overall defense. Before The Taken King, class items were only cosmetic (such as the Hunter's cloak) and did not have any stat or defense boosts. With The Taken King update, class items were given defense that contributes to players' Light level. Players' Ghost companion was also given defense with The Taken King update that contributes to their Light level. In addition to earning gear from loot drops by playing missions and other activities, players can purchase gear from faction vendors. Players can pledge their allegiance to one of three factions — Dead Orbit, Future War Cult, or New Monarchy — and earning enough reputation with a faction allows players to earn and purchase that faction's legendary items. Players also earn reputation with other vendors, such as the Vanguard and Crucible, by doing playlists or bounties for that vendor, which also have their own set of legendary items.

=== Player versus environment (PvE) ===
Player versus environment game types makes up the majority of the game. PvE story missions can be played either solo or as part of a "fireteam" of up to three players. Initially, although there was an order to the story missions, they could be played in any order as more missions became available. For example, after completing Earth's second story mission, three more became available, but did not have to be played in story order. The questing system introduced in House of Wolves and refined in The Taken King requires story missions to be played in order due to quest step progression. Every day, a random story mission is featured as the Daily Heroic Story Mission, featuring bonus rewards. Each playable area offers an open world "Patrol" mode, where players can travel freely around the area and perform small tasks gathered from beacons, and they can collect materials that are used for upgrading weapons and armor. Players travel around the areas on foot or with their vehicles called Sparrows (very similar to the speeder bikes of Star Wars). Public events happen periodically and any player in the same location can participate. These location-specific events include eliminating a target, defeating incoming waves of enemies, and defending a Warsat (a crashed satellite).

"Strikes" are cooperative missions played with a party of three players that culminate with a boss; most strikes are side missions that are not part of the main plot. Players can play much harder versions of the strikes in what are called the SIVA Crisis Strike (formerly Vanguard Heroic Playlist) and the Weekly Nightfall Strike, which grant bonus rewards. While the SIVA Crisis is a playlist of strikes from The Taken King and Rise of Iron (as well as older strikes updated with Taken and SIVA-infected enemies), the Weekly Nightfall Strike, which is harder than heroic, is only one strike that changes every week with a chance for greater rewards. The Daily Heroic Story Mission, SIVA Crisis Strike, and Weekly Nightfall Strike each feature game modifiers that increase difficulty. Game modifiers can be positive or negative for the player. For example, a positive modifier would be "Small Arms", where damage for the player's primary weapons are doubled, but a negative modifier would be "Chaff", where the player's radar is disabled. Raids are advanced cooperative missions designed to be played by a team of six players — the only PvE game type that allows more than three players in a fireteam. Raids culminate with the elimination of a major boss that relates to the story. With the release of Rise of Iron, there are four raids in Destiny. Those raids include the Vault of Glass, Crota's End, King's Fall, and Wrath of the Machine.

From social spaces (the Tower on Earth, the Vestian Outpost added with House of Wolves, and the Iron Temple added with Rise of Iron), players can redeem "engrams" into items, buy items, and collect challenges known as bounties to complete during activities to earn experience, build their reputation among factions, and sometimes earn items. Beyond armor and weapons, items that players can obtain include ships that represent themselves during travel cutscenes, shaders for customizing the color scheme of their armor, emblems which are banners for players' names, emotes such as a dance or gesture, and shells for their Ghost companion.

=== Player versus player (PvP) ===
In addition to these player versus environment challenges, player versus player combat exists in what is called the Crucible. The Crucible, which can have a maximum of twelve players depending on game type, contains playlists of PvP modes, including "Control", "Clash", "Rumble", and "Skirmish". Control is six-versus-six where teams try to capture and maintain control of zones. Clash is a classic six-versus-six team deathmatch. Rumble is a six-player free-for-all deathmatch. Skirmish is a three-versus-three deathmatch where players can revive allies. New modes have been added via expansions, including "Elimination" (House of Wolves), a similar mode to Skirmish except divided into nine rounds in which the team must kill all three of their opponents at once, "Rift" (The Taken King), a six-versus-six capture the flag-like mode where players must deliver a "Spark" to the opposing team's base, killing enemies in its radius, and "Supremacy" (Rise of Iron), a six-versus-six mode where players drop crests when killed and points are scored by picking up crests dropped by the enemy team.

Other modes are available occasionally during time-limited periods, such as "Salvage", a three-versus-three king of the hill game type, "Combined Arms", where the Control and Clash modes are on maps with vehicles and turrets, "Inferno" (The Dark Below), a modifier on multiple game modes where points are solely scored on kills and the player's radar is disabled, "Doubles" (The Dark Below), a two-versus-two version of Skirmish, "Mayhem" (The Taken King), a modifier on Clash and Rumble where cooldown times for all abilities are greatly reduced, and "Zone Control" (The Taken King), a modified version of Control where points are only scored for maintaining control of zones, and not by kills or point captures. A random mode is featured as the Daily and Weekly Crucible mode with bonus rewards. As of September 2015, players who do not own The Taken King or Rise of Iron expansions only have access to three-versus-three and six-versus-six Crucible playlists on previous maps with assorted modes, and no longer have access to playlists for individual modes.

In Crucible modes, player statistics (such as weapon power and defense) are balanced between players. The periodic events Iron Banner and Trials of Osiris are offered, which disable balancing. These events have their own set of bounties and allows players the chance to earn exclusive items. Iron Banner became available shortly after the launch of Destiny and originally only used the Control game mode; with the release of Rise of Iron, it rotates between Control, Clash, Rift, and Supremacy. It is available during the last week of each month. Trials of Osiris was added with the House of Wolves expansion and uses the Elimination mode. It is available every weekend from Friday until the weekly reset on Tuesday. Players who go undefeated in this mode gain access to an exclusive social space on Mercury called The Lighthouse.

A week prior to the launch of the Rise of Iron expansion, the option to make private matches was added; this option is available to all players on PlayStation 4 and Xbox One, regardless if they purchase Rise of Iron. Private matches allow players to set up their own custom matches. Customization options include game mode, map, score and time limits, enabling Light level, and time of day. Players can choose the number of players for the match, including beginning a match by themselves.

== Synopsis ==
=== Setting ===
Bungie described the setting of Destiny as a "mythic science-fiction" world. The setting, about 700 years in the future, follows a prosperous period of exploration, peace, and technological advancement known as the Golden Age. In a universe where humans have spread out and colonized planets in the Solar System, an event known as "the Collapse" saw the mysterious dissolution of these colonies, the end of the Golden Age, and mankind teetering on the brink of extinction. The only known survivors of the Collapse are those living on Earth, who were saved by "the Traveler", a white, spherical celestial body whose appearance centuries before had enabled humans to reach the stars. The Collapse was caused by a mysterious force called the Darkness, an ancient enemy of the Traveler that plagues the galaxy. The Traveler, after driving off the Darkness, now hovers damaged and comatose above the last safe city on Earth, simply called The Last City, which is surrounded by a massive Wall, and its presence allows the Guardians — the defenders of the City — the ability to wield an unknown power, only referred to as "Light". The player takes on the role of a Guardian, and is tasked with reviving the Traveler while investigating and destroying alien threats before humanity is completely wiped out.

Upon mankind's first attempt to repopulate and reconstruct after the Collapse, it is discovered that hostile alien races have occupied mankind's former colonies and civilizations, and are now encroaching upon the city. Throughout the game, players have to combat aggressive aliens who have occupied the Solar System. Just like the Light for the Guardians, the Darkness lends powers to these alien threats. There are five separate races in the game, each occupying different planets. Over the course of Destiny, Destiny 2 and their expansions, more about these races and their connection to the Traveler and the Darkness is discovered.

- The Fallen, also known as the Eliksni, are an insectoid race of nomadic pirates who scavenge ruined settlements on Earth, Earth's Moon, and Venus for resources. The Fallen are split among several tribal-like Houses, each with its own leader known as a Kell. Long before the Traveler arrived in the System, it had visited the Fallen's home world of Riis and similarly gave rise to a golden age, where they worshipped it as their "Great Machine". In the midst of this age, the Traveler suddenly left them when the Darkness arrived, and their society fell apart as Houses turned against each other. The survivors abandoned the planet to seek out the Traveler, following it to Earth and scavenging whatever technology they could along the way. Rise of Iron added a faction of Fallen called the Devil Splicers, which are Fallen who have been modified by a technological plague called SIVA. They are found on Earth in a zone outside of the Wall called the Plaguelands. With content in the Beyond Light expansion for Destiny 2, some of the Fallen Houses have aligned themselves with the Last City, but several hostile Houses remain.
- The Hive are a macabre race of ancient aliens who have created massive underground settlements beneath Earth and its Moon's surfaces. The Hive originated from a planet called Fundament that had an inescapable gravity well, and the people that lived there, the Krill, eked out a living. One of the rulers, the Osmium King, was killed in a coup, and his three daughters, Aurash, Xi Ro, and Sathona, aware their own lives were in danger, discovered that three Worm Gods, disciples of the Darkness, were trapped in the core of Fundament by the Traveler. The three sisters vowed to help feed the Worm Gods under the principles of the Sword Logic in exchange for immortality and power. The three became the first Hive: respectively, Oryx, the Taken King; Xivu Arath, the God of War; and Savathûn, the Witch Queen. The three converted the Krill to Hive servants and found the means to escape Fundament and chase down the Traveler and its allies.
- The Vex are semi-organic androids who are attempting to seize control of Venus and Mars by turning them into their machines, which they have already done to Mercury. Vex are made of millions of microscopic artificial organisms that are linked via a giant mind network and survive in an organic fluid called radiolaria; each individual Vex android hosts a number of these organisms in its core. Because of their massive processing power, the Vex are constantly running simulations of the past, present, and future to try to outmaneuver their enemies in their goal to convert the entire universe to Vex, and have mastered some elements of time travel. A Vex sect called the Sol Divisive, worship the Darkness and are one of their most dangerous allies.
- The Cabal are a military-industrial empire of gigantic amphibians who have established massive fortifications on Mars. Comparable to the Roman Empire, they have seized a large portion of the galaxy around their homeworld and have been continually expanding for new territories. Their bases on Mars are seen as scouting missions for a potential invasion of Earth. Since Destiny 2's Season of the Chosen, the Cabal leadership has made a truce with the Vanguard due to their common foes of the Hive and the Darkness, but there remain many splinter Cabal groups that fight against the Last City.
- The Taken, a race introduced in The Taken King, are ghostly-looking corrupted versions of regular enemies, who infest areas on every planet. Oryx, the Taken King, was granted the ability to create his Taken army by drawing foes into the Ascendant Plane, which granted them new paracausal powers but drained them of their individuality and compelled to serve the one that created them. Other major enemies have since been able to create their own armies of Taken forces.

Every race utilizes different tactics and weapons in combat. The Fallen possess cloaking and short-range teleportation technologies to increase their mobility. The Hive use superior numbers to overwhelm their opponents in close quarters while more elite units attack from a distance. The Vex utilize hard-light shields and teleport units of infantry into the battlefield en-masse. The Cabal rely on heavy armor, ballistic shields, and jump packs to combat players. The Taken, in addition to all the other races specialties, use high mobility and plenty of long-range attacks to out-maneuver the player. The Devil Splicers, in addition to the other Fallen's tactics and weapons, use multiple, unpredictable, lightning-like shots to surprise the player and hit them even while strafing. All of these races are hostile towards each other (with the exception of the Hive and the Taken), as they can often be observed attacking one another in-game for territorial dominance. The majority of the game's lore, detailing backstory on characters, weapons, the alien races, planets, etc., was found in Grimoire cards collected throughout the game but could only be accessed through Bungie's website and the Destiny app.

=== Characters ===
In addition to the player's Guardian, Destiny has many non-playable characters (NPCs) that aide the Guardians either in story missions, or by selling gear, weapons, or materials. The player's Ghost (originally Peter Dinklage, later replaced by Nolan North), (Note: Peter Dinklage voiced Ghost in the original release of Destiny, but due to his availability, veteran voice actor Nolan North replaced Dinklage with the release of The Taken King expansion, and re-recorded all of Dinklage's lines from the base game.) is a small flying artificial intelligence unit created by the Traveler, and serves as the principal intermediary between the player and the universe of Destiny. Because the player-controlled Guardian rarely speaks, the player's Ghost is the game's most central voiced character and its de facto narrator.

Other main NPC's in Destiny are the Speaker (Bill Nighy), the representative of The Traveler; the Exo Stranger (Lauren Cohan), a mysterious female Exo who is interested in the Guardian's activities, but is not a Guardian herself; Mara Sov (Kirsten Potter), the Queen of the Reef and the Awoken, and the Kell (leader) of the Fallen House of Wolves; Prince Uldren Sov (Brandon O'Neill), the Queen's brother; Ikora Rey (Gina Torres), the Warlock Vanguard; Commander Zavala (Lance Reddick), the Titan Vanguard; Cayde-6 (Nathan Fillion), the Hunter Vanguard; and Master Rahool (Erick Avari), the Tower's Cryptarch who decodes engrams and buys curiosities from Guardians. The player's Guardian is voiced by one of six people, depending on which species and gender the player selects when creating their character: Matthew Mercer and Susan Eisenberg as the male and female Human guardians, Crispin Freeman and Grey Griffin as the male and female Awoken Guardians, and Peter Jessop and Cree Summer as the male and female Exo Guardians.

Other notable NPCs include Lord Shaxx (Lennie James), the Crucible Handler; Lakshmi-2 (Shohreh Aghdashloo), representative of Future War Cult; Arach Jalaal (Peter Stormare), representative of Dead Orbit; Executor Hideo (James Remar), representative of New Monarchy; Tess Everis (Claudia Black), Eververse Trading Company (microtransaction vendor that primarily sells emotes); Banshee-44 (John DiMaggio), the Gunsmith; Amanda Holliday (Courtenay Taylor), ship and sparrow merchant; Lord Saladin (Keith Ferguson), former Iron Banner vendor who became the main NPC of Rise of Iron; Xûr (Fred Tatasciore), an Agent of the Nine and exotic items vendor; and Eva Levante (Nika Futterman), the Guardian Outfitter (vendor that sells emblems and armor shaders who later became the vendor for seasonal events, such as Festival of the Lost and The Dawning).

Several characters were introduced in the expansions and events of Destiny. These include Petra Venj (April Stewart), the Queen's Emissary who was introduced with the Queen's Wrath event and returned as a main NPC in House of Wolves; Eris Morn (Morla Gorrondona), Crota's Bane vendor that was introduced as the main NPC of The Dark Below as well as a main NPC of The Taken King; Variks the Loyal (Dee Bradley Baker), House of Judgment vendor who was introduced as a main NPC of the House of Wolves and is a Fallen Vandal loyal to the Queen; Master Ives (Gideon Emery), the Vestian Outpost's Cryptarch; Brother Vance (Bob O'Donnell), a Disciple of Osiris and the Trials of Osiris vendor — Osiris is a character in the lore of Destiny; Tyra Karn, an archivist in the Iron Temple added with Rise of Iron who is also a Cryptarch; Shiro-4, a scout and Vanguard vendor in the Iron Temple; and Lady Efrideet (Riva Di Paola), a former Iron Lord discovered to still be alive who took command of the Iron Banner in Saladin's place, as Saladin became focused on the SIVA Crisis.

=== Plot ===
The game begins in the distant future where a Ghost is searching among the detritus of Old Russia until it finds and resurrects the player's Guardian, who had been killed in an ancient battle—upon resurrection, Guardians have no memories of their past. Ghost then guides the Guardian to a jump ship and they take it to the Tower. There, they meet the Speaker, who briefs them about the Darkness. The Guardian is then tasked to probe the nearby Cosmodrome, where humanity used to launch its forays into outer space, fending off Fallen enemies and eventually the Hive, who were thought to have been confined to the Moon. The Guardian discovers that an old Russian Warmind called Rasputin, an AI built to defend Earth, is still alive and acting with unknown intent. The Guardian also tracks down codes to raise an ancient Array to connect it to long-lost colonies throughout the Solar System, that Rasputin uses to spread its influence to other parts of the system. They then set off to the Moon in search of a lost Guardian who was looking for a way into the Hive fortress. After locating his corpse and dead Ghost, the player's Guardian's Ghost discovers that the Hive are raising an army and plan to invade Earth. The Guardian quickly sets about disrupting their efforts, including shutting down a ritual that the Hive were using to drain power from the Traveler using a piece of the Traveler (which the guardian frees, allowing it to return to the Traveler), and destroying a powerful weapon called the Sword of Crota, (Note: With the release of The Taken King, "The Sword of Crota" mission became the first mission of The Dark Below questline.) and severing their long-distance communications. Around this time, the Guardian is contacted by the Exo Stranger, a mysterious woman who summons them to Venus to face a new enemy, the Vex.

When the Guardian arrives on Venus, the Exo Stranger describes the Vex as an evil so dark it despises other evil. She tells them about the Black Garden, a city where the Vex are born, and implores the Guardian to find it and rip out its heart, as it is the only way the Traveler will begin to heal. Ghost says that they need to speak to the Awoken, who lurk out in the Reef (the asteroid belt) and refuse to take sides in the galaxy's wars. The Exo Stranger then leaves, as she did not have time to explain things further. Once the Guardian arrives at the Reef, they meet the Queen of the Reef, Mara Sov, and her brother, Prince Uldren Sov, who tells the Guardian that they will help them locate the Black Garden if they bring them the head of a Vex Gate Lord. The Guardian travels back to Venus, where they uncover the Archive, which reveals secrets about the Vex, including the location of a place called the Vault of Glass, and pathways across the galaxy. After defeating Draksis, a Fallen Kell of the House of Winter, (Note: With the release of The Taken King, the "Scourge of Winter" mission became the first mission of the House of Wolves questline.) the Guardian confronts the Vex Gate Lord, claims its head, and returns to the Queen, who tells them to take its eye to the Meridian Bay on Mars, where it can be used to enter the Black Garden.

After arriving on Mars in the Meridian Bay, Ghost informs the Guardian of its inhabitants. The Cabal have been trying to break the encryption on the Vex Gate with only limited success, but they do control many of the places that the Guardian needs to visit on Mars thanks to their Exclusion Zone, which nobody had ever penetrated. The player's Guardian becomes the first to penetrate the Exclusion Zone and heads to the Garden's Spire, which charges the Gate Lord's eye. They also travel to the Buried City, the birthplace of many technological wonders where they discover an AI that used to be linked to the Warmind of Mars, but, after the activation of the Array, is now controlled by Rasputin. With the Vex now present on Mars, the Guardian finds out what they are doing; they are returning to their home, the Black Garden.

The Guardian then sets off to the Black Garden. After going through a teleporter, they find themselves in a place that is not on any map of known space and time. After several battles, the Guardian reaches the heart of the Black Garden, which the Vex appear to be worshipping. The heart summons three Sol Progeny— a group of Vex units called Eschaton Mind, Imminent Mind, and Primeval Mind. After defeating the three Sol Progeny, the heart is destroyed, returning the Guardian and the Garden itself to Mars and lifting the shroud of Darkness from the Traveler back on Earth, allowing it to begin healing. At the Tower, the Speaker addresses gathered Guardians in a celebratory speech. Over in the nearby hangar, though, the player's Guardian converses with the Exo Stranger, who says that the fight is far from over.

The heart of the Black Garden may have been destroyed, but on Venus, the Vault of glass suddenly reopens. A team of Guardians decide to investigate the mysterious Vault of Glass ("Vault of Glass" raid), described as the "Vex underworld" by the Ishtar Collective. The Vault is a realm where the Vex can control reality, and even erase people from existence. This power is used by the most powerful denizens within the vault: a Vex sub-race called the Gorgons, a powerful Vex mind called the Templar, and Atheon, Time's Conflux. Both Atheon and the Templar utilize machines called Oracles to do so. While these powers do not extend to outside the Vault, its enigmatic nature has lured countless Guardians to their doom— the most infamous being the ill-fated fireteam of Kabr, the Legionless, which consisted of himself, Future War Cult Warlock Praedyth, and well-known hunter Pahanin. Pahanin was the only member to make it out alive; Praedyth was forever lost in the dark corners of time, and Kabr drank the radiolaria of the Oracles, and was turned into a Vex. However, in Kabr's last moments, he used his Light to close the Vault and leave behind an artifact, the Aegis, to help any other Guardians daring enough to follow in his footsteps. The new fireteam of Guardians make their descent, and attempt to succeed where Kabr and his fireteam failed. Using the Aegis, the Guardians manage to defeat the Templar and its Oracles. They then successfully traverse the Gorgon's labyrinth undetected before finally reaching Atheon, Time's Conflux. A central figure of the Vex Conflux network, Atheon is able to send Guardians into the distant past or future at will, and summons versions of Vex from the past and future to aid him. The Vex mind is also capable of summoning Oracles like the Templar, and attempts to erase the new Fireteam from existence. However, despite the astronomical odds, the Guardians fight their way through time, destroy the Oracles, and defeat Atheon, eliminating a major Vex threat.

The events of Destiny: The Dark Below follow.

== Development ==
Bungie had announced in 2007 it was becoming an independent studio and separating from Microsoft Game Studios, though contractually remained committed to completing Halo: Reach. As Bungie tied up development of Reach in 2010, it began developing its next new intellectual property (IP) Destiny under the code name "Project Tiger". The company recognized it would need a major publisher to support their project. According to Martin O'Donnell, they had considered going back to Microsoft and also had approached Sony Interactive Entertainment as a publishing partner, but both companies would have required Bungie to turn over control of the IP, which Bungie considered was "non-negotiable". Activision Blizzard, on the other hand, would allow Bungie to retain control on the IP with expectations of financial performance over the years. Bungie's 10-year publishing agreement with Activision Blizzard was announced by April 2010. Under Bungie's agreement with Activision, new IP developed by Bungie will be owned by Bungie, not Activision, in a deal similar to the EA Partners Program. Details of this contract were revealed during the course of Activision's lawsuit against Jason West and Vincent Zampella, founders and former employees of Infinity Ward, including provisions for four Destiny games over the course of the ten-year deal. Initially, Activision Blizzard CEO Robert Kotick suggested that the total investment in Destiny would be around $500 million. Bungie's COO Pete Parsons clarified that the game's development cost is not even close to $500 million, saying, "For marketing you'd have to ask Activision people, but for development costs, not anything close to $500 million." Activision subsequently confirmed the $500 million figure, stating that marketing, up-front infrastructure costs, and investment in the game's engine were included, and could be amortized over the life of the IP. Bungie would earn an additional $2.5 million bonus payout if the first game achieved a Metacritic score of 90 or above.

By mid-2013, most of the ground work for Destiny had been completed including lore, game engine, and many environments and missions, tracking for a September 2013 release. However, a "supercut" of the game's story and mission structure presented by Joseph Staten's writing team did not test well with Bungie upper management, led by Jason Jones. Jones felt that the story was too dense and linear— a design philosophy he felt was important to Destiny was the ability for the player to choose where to go at any time. As a result, the entire mission progression of the game was rebuilt between mid-2013 and the game's launch in September 2014, shifting away from a structure that quickly introduced the four major environments — Earth, the Moon, Venus, and Mars — to a hub-based structure in which each planet would be visited sequentially with an expanding variety of missions on each. Existing missions were spliced and rearranged to fit this new paradigm, including dialogue and cinematics. Staten decided to leave the company amidst this reboot, though this would not be announced until September 2013.

To cement the new framework, Jones developed the director interface that exists in the shipping version of the game, from which planets and missions can be selected. He also established the "Iron Bar", a series of executive meetings which would oversee the massive project restructuring. This also involved rescoping the project to be more focused — areas such as the Hive fortress Dreadnaught, an Earth location called the European Dead Zone, and Osiris' temple on Mercury were cut — all would later return in future installments. The restructuring also required an internal delay of the release date first from September 2013 to March 2014, and again to its actual release of September 9, 2014. With Staten's departure, the writing team he had built at Bungie for the Halo series was left leaderless and isolated. As a result, much of this extra time was spent perfecting the gameplay and feel of the shooting while the narrative was only polished to a perfunctory level and "the story was written without writers".

On April 11, 2014, Bungie fired its long-time composer and audio director, Martin O'Donnell. For Destiny, O'Donnell collaborated with Paul McCartney on an eight-movement symphonic suite called Music of the Spheres which was completed in 2013. The dispute which led to his termination originated from O'Donnell's belief that the Activision deal had begun to erode the collegial culture at Bungie. Activision was reluctant to release the symphony as a standalone work and went over O'Donnell's head to replace it with their own music in a prominent E3 2013 trailer. In the ensuing disagreement, O'Donnell came into conflict with both Activision and Bungie leadership and was accused of "unacceptable conduct" in his performance review, leading to his termination. Fans were concerned that the absence of Martin O'Donnell would affect the in-game music of Destiny; however, Pete Parsons of Bungie confirmed that Destiny's music was already complete by this point. O'Donnell prevailed in a civil suit against Bungie over the improper dismissal in September 2015, winning unpaid wages, profit sharing, and lost stock. However, Bungie later filed a complaint against O'Donnell in 2021 after O'Donnell had uploaded his work from Music of the Spheres and Destiny to his YouTube and Bandcamp channels, which Bungie stated was against the terms placed against O'Donnell as a result of an injunction raised in the 2015 trial, who had been ordered to return all this work to Bungie. O'Donnell was found in contempt of court in September 2021 for violating that injunction and ordered to remove the material as well as submit to review of all his electronic media for any further copies of Destiny-related materials.

=== Technology ===
Destiny incorporates a new game engine, called the Tiger Engine, that is based on the engine used for most Halo games. It allows for global illumination and real-time dynamic lighting to occur together in cohesion. Bungie's goal was for Destiny to natively render graphics at 1080p on both the Xbox One and PlayStation 4. An innovation in Bungie's "hopper" technology, which has been the backbone for Halo's matchmaking system, will allow better player matchmaking in order to create a more natural experience in either cooperative or competitive multiplayer modes. Developers at Bungie have criticized the new engine as ill-suited to the online nature of the game; its resource-intensive nature resulted in even small changes to maps requiring an overnight rendering and compiling process. Internal sources called the development of new maps and missions "grueling" on account of the game engine.

=== Design ===
For Destiny, lead writer Joseph Staten hoped to build a universe that would "take on a life of its own". The designers worked around "seven pillars", seven core principles which ensure that the game is accessible to both casual, novice players and experienced veterans of first-person shooters and MMOs. This includes integration with social media, allowing players to gain information about new quests and their friends' activities.

In designing the playable classes, Bungie was inspired by different sources of science fiction. Hunters are a reconnaissance class meant to be reminiscent of the classic bounty hunter. Bungie cites as influences Star Wars' Han Solo and classic characters from old Western films such as Clint Eastwood's Man with No Name. Warlocks combine weapons with special powers from "the Traveler", and are meant to be a form of "space wizard". The Warlock class is influenced by the Star Wars series's Jedi Knights, The Lord of the Rings series's Gandalf, and The Matrix series's Morpheus. Titans, which favor heavy weapons and melee attacks and are intended to be reminiscent of the classic "future soldier", were inspired by Bungie's own Master Chief from Halo, Stormtroopers from Star Wars, and other "space marines" from science fiction. Bungie also cited the influence of action role-playing games Monster Hunter and Dark Souls, noting their mechanical depth and brutality.

=== Portrayal of Ghost ===
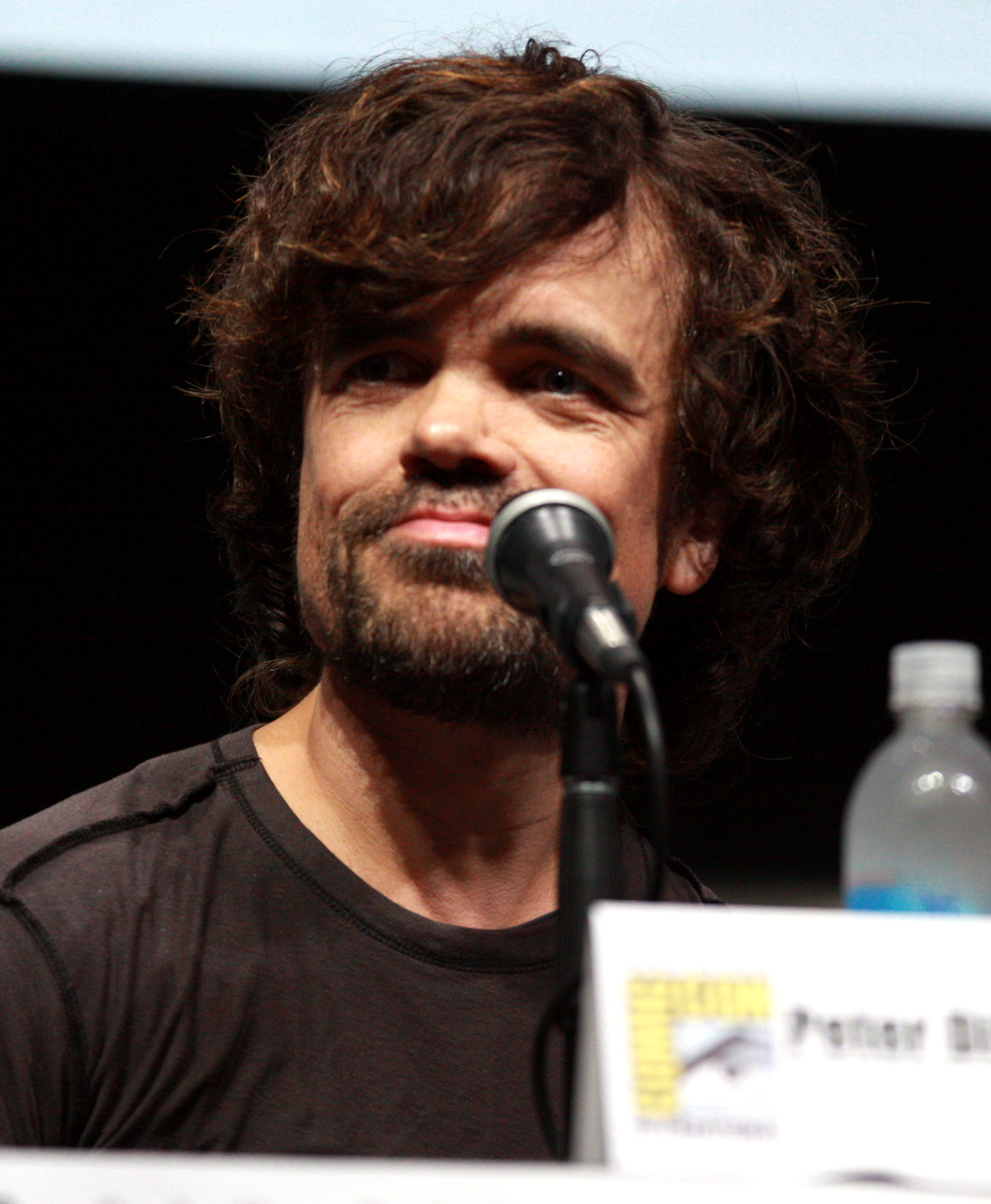
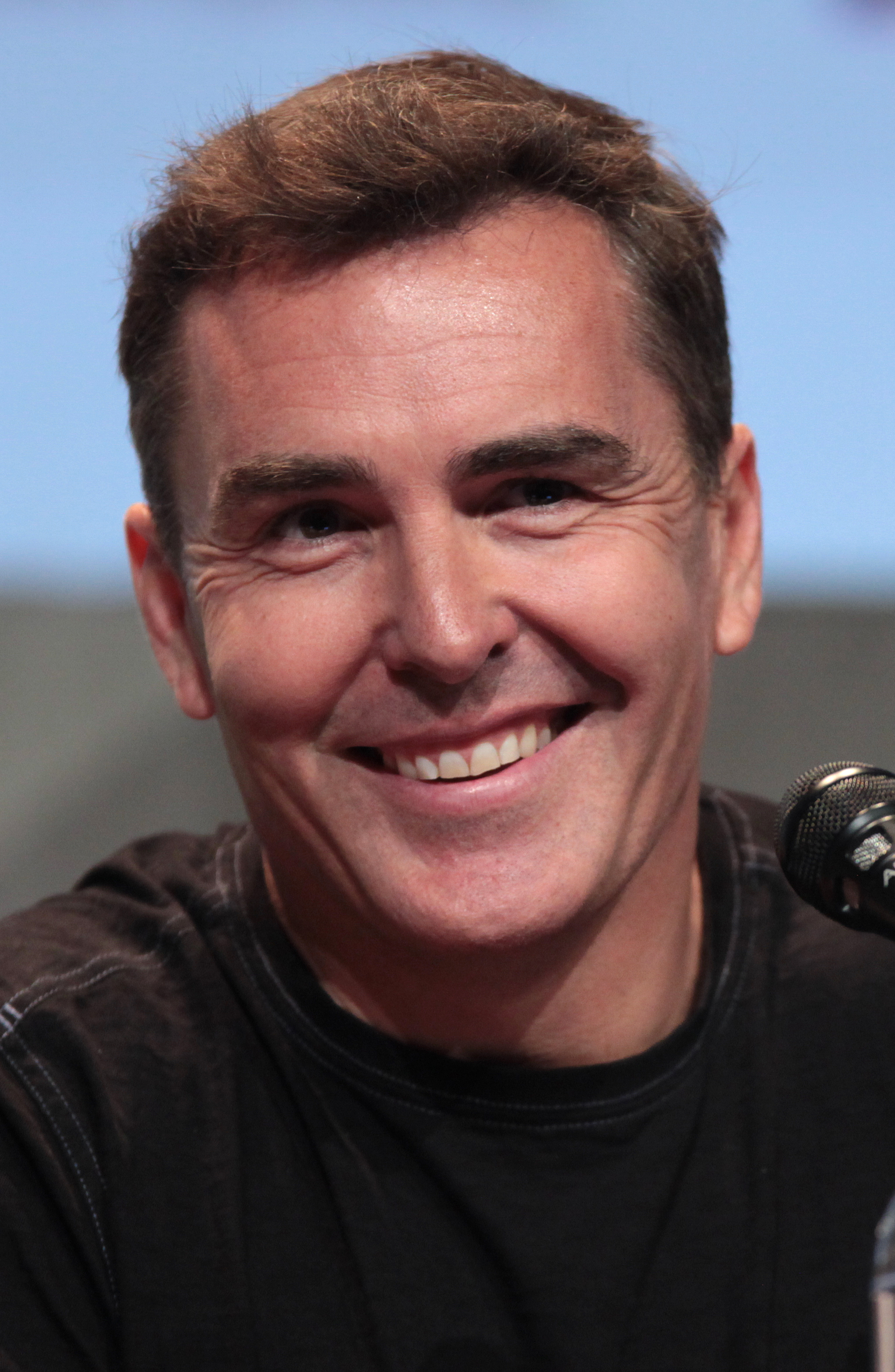
The player's companion Ghost was initially voiced by Peter Dinklage (left), but due to Dinklage's availability, he was replaced by Nolan North (right) starting with The Taken King, with North re-recording all of Dinklage's lines from the base game.

Peter Dinklage originally voiced the character Ghost in the base game. The character did not have any lines in the two expansions of Year One as Dinklage did not record any dialogue. Bungie executive producer Mark Noseworthy attributed the eventual recasting to the difficulty of repeatedly scheduling a prominent film and television actor for an ongoing game.

Nolan North replaced Dinklage for The Taken King and also re-recorded all of Ghost's lines from the original game. He said that he did not listen to any of Dinklage's recordings as he did not want any preconceived notions to influence his performance, and that Bungie encouraged him to develop his own interpretation while ensuring that Ghost possessed enough personality to remain engaging without ceasing to sound like an artificial being. North regarded Ghost's awareness of mortality as important to the character: unlike the Guardian, Ghost cannot simply be resurrected if destroyed and therefore has a personal interest in the Guardian's survival.

Before the original game's release, comedians David Cross and Brian Posehn were brought to Bungie's offices to revise Ghost's dialogue and add humour. Cross said that they wrote self-referential jokes and lines for Ghost that acknowledged conventions familiar to video-game players, but that none of their material was used in the final game. He believed that Bungie had decided the humour would conflict with the intended tone of the game.

=== Soundtrack ===
==== Destiny Original Soundtrack ====
Destiny (Original Soundtrack)

Soundtrack album by Michael Salvatori, C Paul Johnson, Martin O'Donnell & Paul McCartney
- Released: 26 September 2014
- Recorded: 2012–2014
- Studios: Abbey Road, London
- Genres: Classical; ambient
- Length: 138:48
- Label: Bungie Music Publishing
- Producer: Jonty Barnes

Destiny (Original Soundtrack) is the official soundtrack for the video game, composed by Michael Salvatori, C Paul Johnson, Martin O'Donnell and Paul McCartney. Released digitally via iTunes on September 26, 2014, the soundtrack contains 44 instrumental compositions from the game. The soundtrack marked O'Donnell's final work for Bungie, after years of composing for the Halo franchise, as well as several games before that. In addition, McCartney wrote and recorded an original song inspired by the game, titled "Hope for the Future".

Early in Destiny's development, O'Donnell was contacted by Pete Parsons (current Chief Operating Officer of Bungie), and was asked to begin writing music for the game. At the time, Destiny was still in its infancy, as it lacked any gameplay material for O'Donnell to score music to, so instead, O'Donnell began creating music based solely on the game's ideas, stories, and artwork. By February 17, 2013, over 50 minutes of the soundtrack had already been recorded with a 106-piece orchestra at Abbey Road Studios in London. O'Donnell gave the early pieces of music to Bungie in hopes that they would foster inspiration within the development team.

Unlike the Halo series, where pieces of music were only 2–3 minutes long, O'Donnell has stated that the soundtrack for Destiny has no time restrictions, with the pieces clocking in "as long as they need to be". O'Donnell collaborated with Paul McCartney on the soundtrack for the better part of two years, as they traded ideas, melody samples, and themes back and forth. On April 11, 2014, Martin O'Donnell was dismissed without cause by the board of directors at Bungie. This caused concern as to whether this would affect the game; however, Pete Parsons stated that O'Donnell's work on the game had been completed before his dismissal and would appear in the final product.

==== Music of the Spheres ====
Music of the Spheres is an eight-part musical companion piece to Destiny, composed by Marty O'Donnell together with Michael Salvatori and Paul McCartney. Parts of the music were used to accompany a Destiny trailer at E3 2013, and in the official soundtrack. But following O'Donnell's dismissal from and subsequent legal dispute with Bungie, Music of the Spheres remained unreleased. It was leaked to the Internet by unknown persons in December 2017. Bungie officially released the album on June 1, 2018.

=== Release ===
Destiny concept art and plot elements first leaked in November 2012. Bungie supplemented the leak with more details, expressing regret that another upcoming video game had been revealed ahead of schedule. Destiny's official unveiling occurred at the PlayStation 4 announcement event on February 20, 2013. An alpha test took place from June 12 to 16, 2014 exclusively on PS4. A public beta test began on PlayStation consoles on July 17, 2014, and Xbox consoles on July 23, 2014, available to players who pre-ordered the game. Before the beta closed on July 27, it attracted around 4.6 million players. The game went gold on August 23, 2014. Destiny was released worldwide on September 9, 2014, for the PlayStation 3, PlayStation 4, Xbox 360, and Xbox One. Players who pre-ordered the game received early access to the Vanguard Armory. Additionally, pre-orders from GameStop received an exclusive "red" sparrow vehicle. Players who pre-ordered Call of Duty: Advanced Warfare received a Blacksmith armor shader in Destiny. Those who purchased the digital PlayStation 3 or Xbox 360 versions of the game were allowed to download the PlayStation 4 or Xbox One clients respectively at no additional cost, until January 15, 2015.

Some of the game's initial content, including certain items and missions, were timed exclusives for PlayStation platforms. These included the "Dust Palace" strike, the "Exodus Blue" Crucible map, two exotic weapons (the auto rifle "Monte Carlo" and hand cannon "Hawkmoon"), a rare gear set for each class (Manifold Seeker for Warlock, Vanir for Titan, and Argus for Hunter), and three ships ("Aurora Awake", "Crypt Hammer", and "Outrageous Fortune"). Each expansion followed suit and had timed exclusives for PlayStation platforms. The initial exclusive content and the content of the first two expansions became available for the Xbox platforms with the release of The Taken King. The Taken King's and Rise of Iron's exclusive content became available in October 2017.

Three collector's editions of Destiny were released: the Limited Edition, the Ghost Edition, and the Digital Limited Edition. The Limited Edition included a SteelBook game case, the Arms & Armament Field Guide, postcards from the Golden Age, Antique Star Chart, and in-game content: an exclusive Ghost shell, ship, character emblem, and the Destiny Expansion Pass. The Ghost Edition included everything in the Limited Edition, as well as a motion-activated replica Ghost with lights and the voice of Peter Dinklage and a set of photos and stickers. The Digital Limited Edition included Destiny and the in-game content included in the physical collector's editions. A PS4 bundle was also available, which included a 500GB glacier white PS4 and a copy of Destiny.

With the release of The Taken King, two new retail versions of Destiny, the "Legendary Edition" and "Collector's Edition", were released alongside The Taken King: both included a copy of the game, all "Year One" DLC, and The Taken King. A Digital Collector's Edition was also available. Year One players received commemorative items when purchasing The Taken King. A new PS4 bundle was also available, which included a limited edition white 500GB PS4 with Destiny artwork on the face of the console, the Legendary Edition of The Taken King, and all bonus content from the Legendary and Digital Collector's Editions. Players who purchased The Taken King received an item called Spark of Light, which boosted one new character to level 25, the minimum level needed to play The Taken King's content.

With the release of Rise of Iron, a new retail version of Destiny was also released alongside the expansion called "Destiny: The Collection". It includes a copy of the game, and all DLC up to and including Rise of Iron. Like The Taken King, players who purchase Rise of Iron receive an item called Spark of Light, although this one boosts one new character to level 40, which is the minimum level needed to play Rise of Iron's content.

== Post-release content ==
Destiny content releases Original game and expansions in bold
2014	**Year 1– Destiny**
2014	***The Dark Below**
2015	***House of Wolves**
2015	**Year 2 – The Taken King**
2016	*April Update
2016	**Year 3 – Rise of Iron**
2017	*Age of Triumph

Prior to the official release of Destiny in September 2014, Bungie declared that a major component of the game would be a continuous release of new content. Bungie Director of Production Jonty Barnes said: "We're going to continuously update the game from now until the end of time. That's always going to be part of the philosophy of Destiny. We always wanted to build a new universe but keep building upon it, rather than to do a complete and utter restart periodically". By the time of Destiny's launch, two planned packs of downloadable content (DLC) had been officially announced: The Dark Below and House of Wolves. From the launch of Destiny, players could purchase the "Expansion Pass'", which included the first two expansions at a discounted price versus buying them separately. Players also received an exclusive sparrow (EV-30 Tumbler) if they purchased the Expansion Pass or The Dark Below by January 15, 2015. At E3 2015, Bungie officially announced a new expansion called The Taken King. A new, large expansion was confirmed in February 2016, later revealed as Rise of Iron.

Bungie released the game's first raid, the "Vault of Glass", as part of the September 16, 2014, update and at the time, it was described as "Destiny's most difficult mission". The Vault of Glass centers on the Vex race on Venus and requires players to defeat Atheon, Time's Conflux. In the weeks proceeding from the release of Destiny, players were reporting areas that could be accessed by various glitches or secret accesses. These areas were described as appearing "half-baked", and were noted to often be devoid of items or NPCs. In an interview with Eurogamer, on the claims that these were on-disc DLC, Bungie president Harold Ryan replied that the content were incomplete resources intended to reduce download requirements for future DLC.

The October 13, 2015, update brought the new vending shop, "Eververse Trading Company", featuring NPC Tess Everis selling emotes in exchange for a new in-game currency, Silver — some complimentary Silver was given to all players when logging in after the update, while additional Silver could be obtained via microtransactions. One of the first emotes was the Enthusiastic Dance, inspired by the Carlton Dance from The Fresh Prince of Bel-Air. Bungie stressed that these emotes were completely optional and the microtransactions were an effort to "bolster the service provided by our live team for another full year". On December 15, 2015, boosting packs became available as microtransactions. The pack automatically boosts one character to level 25 as well as providing a temporary stat boost and "Telemetry" items to assist in further leveling.

For Year Two following the release of The Taken King, senior designer Derek Carroll explained that the studio wanted to shift towards an "event-based model" with "surprises" for players, available to all owners of The Taken King at no additional charge, as opposed to a timed roadmap, as had previously been speculated. Marketing director Eric Osborne further clarified its plans for "Year Two", stating that it would not consist solely of time-limited events as had been implied by others, but new "events, activities, content, and features", as well as an event planned for early 2016 that would be "far larger than anything you've seen since the release of The Taken King".

Prior to Rise of Iron's launch and due to the expansion only being released for the then-current consoles (PS4 and One), players' accounts on legacy consoles (PS3 and 360) were split from the newer consoles. Accounts were previously shared across consoles of the same family. Legacy consoles received their last update on July 26, 2016, excluding emergency fixes for future game-breaking issues.

=== Expansions ===
The Dark Below was released on December 9, 2014. The expansion added new content centering on the Hive race and their deity Crota, Son of Oryx. In addition to a new raid, "Crota's End", maximum attack damage was increased to 331 and the Light level increased to 32. House of Wolves was released on May 19, 2015; the expansion added new content centering on the Fallen race as players attempt to thwart a campaign by Skolas, Kell of Kells, to unite the Fallen race under his rule. Maximum attack damage was increased to 365 and the Light level increased to 34. A new social space was added (Vestian Outpost), as well as two multiplayer modes: the Prison of Elders (a PvE arena) and Trials of Osiris (PvP game type).

The Taken King was released on September 15, 2015, marking the start of "Year Two" of Destiny. The expansion focuses on Oryx, The Taken King and father of Crota, as he leads a new race of enemy, the Taken, to avenge his son's death. A new raid, "King's Fall", was added, new sub-classes were added, as well as many changes to the core gameplay of Destiny, including maximum Light level of 320. The Taken King's April 12, 2016 update, referred to as the "April Update", increased the maximum Light level to 335. The update also added new challenges and increased difficulty for the Prison of Elders PvE arena, among other activities. A new quest storyline was also added where players must defeat Malok, a Taken prince attempting a rise to power in the aftermath of Oryx's defeat.

Rise of Iron was released on September 20, 2016, only for PlayStation 4 and Xbox One, and marked the start of "Year Three". It focuses on the Fallen race as they have breached the Wall that surrounds the Cosmodrome and have acquired the SIVA virus, a Golden Age nanotechnology characterized by self-replication and self-assembly. Lord Saladin guides players as they set out to become the new generation of the Iron Lords and wipe out SIVA. New additions include a new PvP game mode, a significant light level increase (385 at launch, 400 with hard raid), a new Patrol zone on Earth (The Plaguelands), a new social space (Iron Temple), and a new raid, "Wrath of the Machine". The final update to Destiny released on March 28, 2017. Titled "Age of Triumph", it added a 13-page record book, tracking players' progress since the original release of Destiny, and all raids prior to Rise of Iron were increased to Light level 390 with updated rewards that can drop at 400 Light.

=== Events ===
Shortly after the launch of Destiny, a two-week long event began on September 23, 2014, called "Queen's Wrath" with Petra Venj as its main NPC. This event featured bounties and multiple challenges on existing missions for players to complete to obtain exclusive items. A two-week long Halloween-themed event began on October 26, 2015, called "Festival of the Lost" where players could complete quest lines to earn decorative masks for their Guardians. Eva Levante was the main NPC for this event. It returned the following year on October 25, 2016, featuring new quests, masks, and rewards from new NPC Tyra Karn in the Iron Temple, as well as returning ones from the previous year from Eva Levante. On December 8, 2015, a new three-week long event became available called "Sparrow Racing League" (SRL) with Amanda Holliday as its main NPC. In this event, players raced against each other on their sparrows, which Bungie described as a "six-player, free-for-all death race through enemy territory". It was only available to players who owned The Taken King. SRL returned as part of a new holiday event called "The Dawning" on December 13, 2016. The event introduced a new scoring system for Strikes, new quests, weapons, gear, gifts, and treasures, and SRL itself featured new tracks and new rewards. A Valentine's Day-themed event called "Crimson Days" commenced on February 9, 2016, and lasted for one week. Lord Shaxx was the main NPC of the event, and featured a new Crucible mode called Crimson Doubles, a two-versus-two Elimination-style game with a special buff.

=== Gameplay changes ===
Alongside the new story content of The Taken King, other major changes were made to the core gameplay of Destiny as part of the version 2.0 patch released on September 8, 2015, which coincided with a week-long free preview of the PvP multiplayer modes and maps of The Taken King; some of these changes applied to all players, regardless of whether they purchased The Taken King. The voice of the player's Ghost, Peter Dinklage, was replaced by Nolan North; all of Dinklage's existing Ghost dialogue was retroactively replaced with new versions recorded by North.

Experience points are used to level past 20, as opposed to the previous "Light level" system. Characters' previously existing Light levels were converted to character levels when transitioning to the 2.0 patch, while a new separate Light level was determined by averaging the strength and power of the character's equipped gear. Class items, newly introduced Ghost shells for all players, and a new equippable item, a relic, provide additional boosts to a player's abilities. The process of earning faction reputation changed; players "pledge" to a faction for a week, during which they earn reputation for the chosen faction in addition to standard reputation. The Gunsmith NPC now offers reputation for the completion of weapon field testing bounties, which allow the ability to purchase a weekly Legendary weapon from his "Foundry Orders". A mercy rule and matchmaking improvements were added to the Crucible. Players' vaults can now hold up to 108 armor pieces, 108 weapons, and 72 miscellaneous items.

A new "Progress" tab was added to the user menu, which displays character progression through the game's quest storylines, as well as currently active bounties and faction reputation. Up to four active bounties and quests can be pinned to be displayed on the bottom-right of the screen when Nav Mode is used. Players can turn in quests and bounties at any time, and up to 32 quests and 16 bounties can be stored in their inventory. All existing storylines were adapted to work under this new system. A new interface known as "Collections" allows players to track their exotic items, emblems, armor shaders, sparrows, ships, and emotes that they have found, as well as clues for how to obtain those they do not possess.

The new "Legendary Mark" currency replaces Vanguard and Crucible marks (which were completely removed), and are shared across all of a user's characters. Legendary Marks can be used to re-purchase exotic items that had already been found by a user, along with upgraded versions of some pre-existing exotics through the new "Exotic Blueprints" system (although this also requires Exotic Shards), and engrams that are guaranteed to contain a legendary weapon. Gear can be "infused" with more powerful items to increase their strength, provided they are "of the same Year and gear slot, a similar quality and a higher level than the current gear". This allows players the choice of what weapons and gear they want to make the strongest.

Newer weapons and some Year One exotics are capable of higher damage than existing Year One weapons; damage values on all existing weapons were scaled down numerically from 365 to 170 (though damage output is the same), with higher values representing weapons that are more powerful than those from Year One.

== Reception ==
=== Critical reception ===
Reception

Aggregate score
Aggregator	Score
Metacritic	(PS4) 76/100 (XONE) 75/100

Review scores
Publication	Score
AllGame	2.5/5
Computer and Video Games	8/10
Eurogamer	8/10
Game Informer	8.75/10
GameSpot	6/10
GamesRadar+	4.5/5
GameTrailers	8/10
Giant Bomb	3/5
IGN	7.8/10
Joystiq	4/5
Official Xbox Magazine (US)	8/10
Polygon	6/10
Hardcore Gamer	4/5

Destiny received a generally positive critical reception upon release. Aggregating review website Metacritic gave the Xbox One version 75/100 based on 11 reviews, and the PlayStation 4 version 76/100 based on 95 reviews. Bungie halted pre-release reviews stating that they felt the game should be graded only when its social aspects were operative and populated with "thousands of gamers" in order to give a proper assessment.

GameSpot described the game as "a multiplayer shooter that cobbles together elements of massively multiplayer games but overlooks the lessons developers of such games learned many years ago"; however, the game's competitive multiplayer modes were praised for carrying on Bungie's expertise from the Halo franchise with well-designed maps. Tom Watson admitted in New Statesman that it "has taken over my life". He praised how the game "plundered the best bits of other successful franchises" such as Halo, Call of Duty, Wolfenstein: The New Order, and World of Warcraft. Danny O'Dwyer stated that Destiny's development surfaces some troubling ethical questions about the role of design in video game addiction, comparing it to slot machines and lab-pigeons in variable reward experiments. "I'm not saying it's a bad game... I'm saying it's a manipulative one. I mean it's 'Farmville' for shooter fans; instead of farming for land, you're farming for XP, loot, and whatever fake new currency the game creates to keep you inside another masterfully crafted ratio-scheduling system." The Verge criticized the game's reliance on collaboration with other players that demands at least a few hours each week in order to keep up with character power levels with a player's friends or being forced to play with strangers to complete the story content.

GameTrailers gave a generally positive review, but also criticized the weak story and uninspired game locations. However, they did praise the graphics as well as the rush the combat can provide the player. A general lack of cohesive communication between players was also criticized, with Game Informer calling it "downplayed and difficult". Eurogamer felt that the game's environments were "meticulously built, with plenty of enticing nooks and thoughtfully placed cover to support that thrilling combat", but that Patrol mode exposed the worlds as being more like "giant shooter levels connected by narrow passageways than a truly expansive open world".

Destiny was criticized for its lack of story content, with many pointing to the disjointed narrative and shallow plot implementation. Bungie has since acknowledged that the story was lacking in some respects, and stated that the game's first DLC expansion, The Dark Below, would focus on providing more background to the universe of Destiny. The game's end-game content was the subject of criticism, due to its particular focus on grinding for rare items through various means (including multiplayer games and other missions). The discovery of "loot caves" — locations with quickly re-spawning enemies that could previously be used to farm for items — along with initial issues surrounding the Vault of Glass raid mission became associated with these lingering issues.

Dinklage's restrained performance as Ghost initially attracted substantial criticism following the release of the game's alpha test, particularly for the line "That wizard came from the Moon". Reviewing the alpha version for Kotaku, Kirk Hamilton described Dinklage's delivery as wooden, muted and insufficiently engaged with the in-game events surrounding the player. He nevertheless suggested that the direction and writing may have left Dinklage without a clear conception of the character. Bungie responded and said that Ghost's dialogue had already been revised for the subsequent beta and would be revised again before release. Bungie later sold a limited-edition shirt which ironically referred to Dinklage's infamous line, with all proceeds donated to charity.

Dinklage's performance remained closely associated with the post-launch criticism directed at the game's storytelling, to the point that commentators and players nicknamed the original version of the character "Dinklebot". Matt Peckham of Wired described Ghost as the linchpin of the game's narrative machinery, but noted that Dinklage's delivery was widely regarded as detached or uninterested. Peckham also attributed some of the reception to the game's uneven and occasionally unintentionally comic writing rather than solely to the actor. Miller wrote that the negative reception could not be attributed conclusively to Dinklage, distinguishing among the actor's performance, the script, the voice direction and the wider narrative problems of the original game. He considered North's version more emotionally engaged and better able to participate in conversations rather than functioning only as a source of exposition. Later criticism reassessed Dinklage's voice work more favourably. Cameron Kunzelman of Vice argued that in retrospect, Dinklage's apparent lack of enthusiasm could be understood as a deliberate interpretation of an ancient artificial being for whom the fantastic events surrounding the Guardian had become ordinary. Kunzelman characterised Dinklage's Ghost as world-weary, historically situated and emotionally independent of the player and said he preferred Dinklage's detached performance.

Despite the criticism, the game received the title of Game of the Year from GamesRadar, the BAFTA Award for Best Game at the British Academy Video Games Awards. At the 2014 National Academy of Video Game Trade Reviewers (NAVGTR), the game won Original Dramatic Score, New IP and Control Precision, and was nominated for Game Design (New IP), Control Design (3D), Character Design and Art Direction (Contemporary). During the 18th Annual D.I.C.E. Awards, the Academy of Interactive Arts & Sciences awarded Destiny with "Action Game of the Year" and outstanding achievement in "Online Gameplay", "Original Music Composition", and "Sound Design"; it also received nominations for "Outstanding Innovation in Gaming" and "Game of the Year".

=== Sales ===
On September 10, 2014, Activision claimed that Destiny was the most successful new gaming franchise launch, as the game shipped more than US$500 million to retail stores and first-parties worldwide. As of September 17, 2014, there have been over 11 million gameplay sessions within North America. It was also the biggest software launch for the PlayStation 4 since holiday 2013. On November 4, 2014, Activision Publishing CEO Eric Hirshberg revealed that the game has 9.5 million registered players. On December 23, 2014, Bungie revealed that 13 million people have played the game since its launch. As of January 5, 2015, the game has 16 million registered players. As of September 17, 2015, the game has 20 million players.

Destiny sold 91,277 physical retail copies for PlayStation 4 and 49,503 retail copies for PlayStation 3 within the first week of release in Japan, placing second and third place respectively within the Japanese software sales charts for that particular week. Destiny was the third best-selling retail game in the United States in 2014. On May 6, 2015, Activision Blizzard announced that Destiny, along with another title from its subsidiary Blizzard Entertainment, Hearthstone have generated nearly US$1 billion for the company.

57% of Taken King's UK sales were on PlayStation 4.

As of November 2015, Destiny had 25 million registered users, a five million increase in three months.

== Sequel and Spin-off ==
In November 2014, Activision Publishing CEO Eric Hirshberg said "Work has also begun on future expansion packs as well as on our next full game release". Based on documents of the original release schedule for Destiny, Bungie and Activision intended to release new, disc-based sequels every other year until 2019, with large downloadable expansions in between. Originally planned for a September 2016 release (based on the original documents), Bungie confirmed on February 11, 2016, that a full sequel would be released in 2017. That same month, video game writer Christopher Schlerf, who was the lead writer for Halo 4 and worked on Mass Effect: Andromeda, joined Bungie. In December 2016, Bungie announced that Vicarious Visions would be joining the development team along with Activision.

Bungie had confirmed that players' characters and progression would carry over into future releases. However, this turned out only to be true for the expansions of the original Destiny. For the sequel, players who reached level 20 and completed the Black Garden quest in the original had their characters' physical appearance carry over, but not their progression (e.g., powers and gear). Bungie did award veteran players in the sequel to acknowledge their accomplishments in the original Destiny. Bungie stated that the original Destiny would remain online even after the release of the sequel; players' characters remained intact with their progression and items, and the game continues to be supported with patch updates.

Destiny 2 was officially confirmed on March 27, 2017. This was followed up with a teaser trailer narrated by Cayde-6. The teaser showed the Tower under attack by the Cabal. A full reveal trailer released on March 30, showing the three class Vanguards, Commander Zavala, Cayde-6, and Ikora Rey, rallying Guardians in the war-torn Tower. The Cabal are being led by Ghaul, commander of the brutal Red Legion. It was also officially confirmed that in addition to releasing on PlayStation 4 and Xbox One in September 2017, Destiny 2 would release on Windows in October 2017, and exclusively via the Battle.net app, rather than Steam. In October 2019, the game was removed from Battle.net and was published via Steam. In December 2020, it became available on the PlayStation 5 and Xbox Series X/S platforms. On May 21, 2026, Bungie announced that Destiny 2's planned June 9 update, named as Monument of Triumph, would be the last live service content update for the game, after which, it would remain playable as with the original Destiny. The announcement came after parent company Sony took a US$765 million impairment loss on Bungie from its previous fiscal year, in particular due to poor performance of Marathon. At the time of the announcement, Bungie said that a Destiny 3 was not in the works. In September 2026, however, Poria Torkan, Bungie's studio head, and Josh Deane, head of product at Bungie, said that they were planning to "return Destiny to its original promise" with major changes. This includes re-adding all previously removed content so that they can lay the foundation to create more Destiny stories and games. There was no time table given, as the executives noted that it would take time to rebuild all of the removed content.

In August 2025, a spin-off to Destiny called Destiny: Rising was released. It is a mobile game developed by NetEase with Bungie's support, available for Android and iOS devices. It is set in an alternate timeline after the events of the Collapse in the Dark Age, but borrows many mainstay characters and themes. Players take on the role of Lightbearers with more ability customization than offered by the main games. The game supports both PvE and PvP content, including modes featured in the main games and new modes for mobile.
