= Slash-in-the-Box =

- Directed by: Nick Everhart
- Written by: Nick Everhart
- Produced by: Nick Everhart; Laura J. Hill; Leigh Scott; Eliza Swenson
- Starring: Tyler Hollinger; Elizabeth Masucci
- Production company: Aweso Entertainment
- Release date: October 28, 2011 (KC Creepfest)
- Running time: 5 minutes
- Country: United States
- Language: English
- Budget: $2,000

Slash-in-the-Box is a short horror film that was written and directed by Nick Everhart. The film was premiered at the KC Creepfest on October 28, 2011, and stars Tyler Hollinger and Elizabeth Masucci. It was selected by the director Eli Roth as a finalist in the 2011 Universal Studios Halloween Horror Nights Short Film Competition and was also nominated for Best Editing in the 2011 Super Shorts International Film Festival.

The short was included in the 2013 horror anthology film The Penny Dreadful Picture Show and later screened on the Fun Size Horror website.

== Synopsis ==
The short opens with a couple playing with an antique jack-in-the-box in their kitchen. They appear to be mildly unnerved by the toy's clown and the wife laughingly leaves the room. Her husband follows shortly after and the two go to bed. Later that night the toy is shown winding itself up and the top opens, however no clown is seen. The husband wakes and hears a baseball rolling down the house's main stairway. He goes downstairs and finds the ball, then enters the kitchen where he sees the closed jack-in-the-box and starts winding it up. The camera then pans down to his feet and the viewer hears the sound of something hitting the man, followed by blood and gore hitting the floor. The wife wakes to the sound of clown laughter and makes her way downstairs. She watches horrified as the jack-in-the-box winds up and springs open, revealing her husband's severed head.

== Cast ==
- Tyler Hollinger as Husband
- Elizabeth Masucci as Wife

== Release ==
Slash-in-the-Box was first shown at the KC Creepfest on October 28, 2011, and was a selection at several film festivals such as the 2012 AMC Theatres Kansas City Film Fest, Killer Film Fest and the Chicago Indie Horror Film Festival. In 2013, it was one of three short horror films featured in the 2013 horror anthology The Penny Dreadful Picture Show, along with The Slaughter House and Morning After. Two years later, in April 2015, Slash-in-the-Box was one of several short films in a competition by the Chiller Channel, as one of their "Chiller Killer Shorts". On October 21 that year, the short was screened on the Fun Size Horror website.

== Reception ==
Film School Rejects wrote a review for the short and marked as their "short film of the day", stating that "It’s no big surprise what happens here, but there’s something deeply satisfying about it all." HorrorNews.net praised it, commenting, "Clever, nice FX work, and overall effective, Slash-in-the-Box is a just a cool little piece." In its review for The Penny Dreadful Picture Show, Horror Society remarked that Slash-in-the-Box was its favorite piece of the collection and wished that it had been longer.
