= Rachel Noll James =

Artist & Film maker

Rachel Noll James (born November 21, 1985) is a filmmaker, actress, and screenwriter known for Inheritance, Ingress, The Storyteller and Don't Pass Me By.

Noll James's first feature film was Don't Pass Me By, a film she wrote, produced, and starred in alongside Keith David, C. Thomas Howell and Sean Stone. James won Best Feature Writer at the LA Femme Festival for the script, and the film was released worldwide in February 2014 by Gravitas Ventures. That same year, she made her directorial debut with the short film Half Light and wrote, produced and starred in the short film Paramnesia. James finished as a quarter-finalist in the NexTV directing talent search for her work on Half Light and Paramnesia was selected to be a part of the acclaimed horror collective Fun Size Horror Volume 1. The short was released worldwide in 2015.

In 2015, Noll James founded Emergence Films with producer Sienna Beckman and wrote and produced The Storyteller, which won the Silver Prize in the PAGE Screenwriting Awards. In 2018, Rachel Noll James wrote and directed the short film Follow the River.

In 2021, Rachel Noll James wrote, directed and starred in the feature film Ingress which garnered upward of 10 nominations in international film festivals, had a limited theatrical run, and was released on streaming in 2024 by Glass House Distribution.

In 2023, Rachel Noll James wrote, produced and starred in the family drama Inheritance, directed by Emily Moss Wilson. The film had its world premiere at Dances with Films in 2024.

== Early life and education ==
Noll grew up in Santa Fe, New Mexico, and attended Occidental College, where she graduated cum laude with a BA in theater.

== Filmography ==
=== Films and television ===
- Comanche Moon (2008) (uncredited)
- Monk (2009)
- A Reading of Tristan and Isolde (2009)
- The Interview (Short) (2011)
- Swing It (2011)
- Cross (2011)
- RID (2012)
- Batman Retired (2012)
- Me Without You (2013)
- Don't Pass Me By (2013)
- Epilogue (2014)
- Half Light (2014)
- Entity (2014)
- Paramnesia in Fun Size Horror, Volume 1 (2015)
- What Did You Say? (2015)
- Eskimo Sisters (2015)
- The Storyteller (2017)
- Zero Point (2017)
- Heroes (2017)
- Risking it All (2017)
- The Caroling Epidemic (2017)
- Follow the River (2017)
- The Time Key (podcast) (2020)
- Malibu Road (2021)
- Uprising (2021)
- There are no Saints (2023)
- Ingress (2023)
- Inheritance (2024)
