= Nick Everhart =

American film director and producer

Nick Everhart is an American film director and producer. He has worked as an intern for The Asylum, where he did various tasks that include line production, writing, and directing, and with the SyFy Channel, where he worked as a producer. Everhart is also an alumnus of the University of Missouri–Kansas City, where he graduated with a degree in 2006.

== Filmography ==
Year	Film	Director	Producer	Editor	Writer	Notes
2006	666: The Beast	Yes	No	No	Yes	
2006	The Visit	Yes	Yes	Yes	Yes	Short film
2007	Invasion of the Pod People	No	Yes	No	No	Line producer
2007	Universal Soldiers	No	Yes	No	No	Line producer
2007	30,000 Leagues Under the Sea	No	Yes	No	No	Line producer
2007	AVH: Alien vs. Hunter	No	Yes	No	No	Line producer
2008	Allan Quatermain and the Temple of Skulls	No	Yes	No	No	Line producer
2008	2012: Doomsday	Yes	Yes	Yes	Yes	
2008	100 Million BC	No	No	Yes	No	
2009	Chrome Angels	No	Yes	No	No	Line producer
2009	Wolvesbayne	No	Yes	No	No	Line producer
2009	The Dunwich Horror	No	Yes	No	No	Line producer
2010	House of Bones	No	Yes	No	No	Line producer
2010	Quantum Apocalypse	No	Yes	No	No	Line producer
2011	The Witches of Oz	No	Yes	Yes	No	Co-producer, 1 episode, editor, 2 episodes, also released as Dorothy and the Witches of Oz in 2012
2011	Slash-in-the-Box	Yes	Yes	Yes	Yes	
2012	Before You	Yes	Yes	Yes	Yes	
2013	Chilling Visions: 5 Senses of Fear	Yes	No	Yes	Yes	Segment "Smell"
2013	The Scout	Yes	Yes	Yes	Yes	
2013	The Penny Dreadful Picture Show	Yes	Yes	Yes	Yes	
2023	The Nana Project	No	No	Yes	No	co-edited with Andrew Keenan-Bolger
