= Fun Size Horror =

Collective of filmmakers

- Type: Collective
- Industry: Film
- Founded: 2015
- Website: http://www.funsizehorror.com/

Fun Size Horror is a collective of filmmakers, led by Zeke Pinheiro, Mali Elfman, and Michael May. The collective's purpose is to create short films that will "explore horror from every angle."

Pinheiro first came up with the idea after realizing that he knew several filmmakers that wanted to "create their own thing and all love horror, but were never given a platform". The collective's initial goal was to create thirty-one horror films by Halloween 2015, but has since expanded to include the creation of additional short horror films. In March 2016 the collective launched an Indiegogo crowdsourcing campaign, with the goal to use the funding to change the collective and website's infrastructure and produce more content. To date two volumes of the shorts have been released for live-streaming through online outlets such as Amazon and Hulu. Shorts have been directed by a wide range of directors and have starred actors such as Keir Gilchrist.

Dread Central rated the first thirty-one shorts favorably, as they felt that the amount of offerings would help ensure that viewers would have a short that they enjoyed.

== Selected shorts ==
=== Fun Size Horror: Volume One (2015) ===
- "When They Say You're Alone" (2014, 4 min.) – directed by Grant Olin
- "Knock Knock" (2014, 4 min.) – directed by Anthony Lund
- "Happy Birthday" (2014, 3 min.) – directed by Erin Stegeman
- "Entity" (2014, 4 min.) – directed by Michael May
- "Bad Eggs"(2014, 3 min.) – directed by Max Isaacson
- "The Screaming"(2014, 2 min.) – directed by Dick Grunert
- "Persephone" (2014, 3 min.) – directed by Lisa J. Dooley
- "Voice" (2014, 4 min.) – directed by Mali Elfman
- "Somebody's Watching You" (4.5 min.) – directed by Ben Rekhi
- "Trust" (2015, 2 min.) – directed by Jerry Pyle
- "The Lover" (2014, 5 min.) – directed by Nat Dinga
- "The Creepy F*cking Kid in Apartment B" (2014, 4 min.) – directed by Eric Pereira
- "A Dog and His Boy" (5 min.) – directed by Zeke Pinheiro
- "Quad" (2014, 5 min.) – directed by Presley Paras
- "Let Me Go" (2.75 min.) – directed by Glen Murakami
- "Mother" (3 min.) – directed by Zeke Pinheiro
- "Evil Voices Lie" (2014, 3 min.) – directed by Grant Olin
- "Paramnesia" (2014, 5 min.) – directed by Rachel Noll
- "Bitter" (2014, 3 min.) – directed by Ned Ehrbar
- "Mr. Hendrix" (4 min.) – directed by Zeke Pinheiro
- "The Collection" (10 min.) – directed by Josh C. Waller

=== Fun Size Horror: Volume Two (2015) ===
- "Prey", directed by Stephen Boyer
- "Playing Dead", directed by Ned Ehrbar
- "Conventional", directed by Karen Gillan
- "And They Watched", directed by Vivian Lin
- "Initiation", directed by Michael May
- "The Great Corben", directed by Mark Alan Miller
- "Perfect", directed by Taylor Phillips
- "Pillow Fright", directed by Patrick Rea
- "Pinned", directed by Andrew Wesman
- "Kill Them Mommy", directed by Peter Chun Mao Wu
- "Last Laugh", directed by Zeke Pinheiro

== See also ==
- Slash-in-the-Box, a 2011 short film featured on the Fun Size Horror website
