= Savathûn =

Fictional character in the Destiny video game series

- Destiny character
- Savathûn and her Ghost Immaru
- First appearance: Destiny 2: Season of the Hunt (2020, as Osiris); Destiny 2: Beyond Light (2021, as Savathûn)
- Voiced by: Debra Wilson

In-universe information
- Species: Hive
- Title: The Witch Queen
- Affiliation: Lucent Brood

Savathûn, also known as the Witch Queen, is a fictional character in Bungie's Destiny video game series. A leader of the alien Hive and their god of cunning, she is an antagonist in Destiny 2 and the title character of its 2022 expansion Destiny 2: The Witch Queen. She is voiced by Debra Wilson.

Introduced in the series' background lore, Savathûn influences events before appearing directly to the player. Bungie used conversations in the game's seasonal stories to introduce her ahead of The Witch Queen. In that expansion, she and her followers acquire the Light, the supernatural power wielded by the player's Guardian. She later returns as an uneasy ally against the Witness.

Reviewers have praised the buildup to Savathûn's appearance and Wilson's performance. Phil Hornshaw of GameSpot also examined how her resurrection challenges the distinction between the Guardians and their enemies. Bungie's announcement of her height prompted comparisons with Lady Dimitrescu from Resident Evil Village.

== Development ==
Bungie introduced Savathûn directly to players before The Witch Queen to avoid establishing and defeating another antagonist within a single expansion. Senior narrative lead Julia Nardin said that weekly conversations with her were intended to create a personal relationship with the player and leave them uncertain about opposing her. Senior narrative designer Nikko Stevens said the team wanted players unfamiliar with the background lore to understand the character.

Creative director James Tsai described The Witch Queen as a mystery in which players would investigate Savathûn's realm as a "psychic detective". He said that deception and uncertainty were necessary to a story about the Hive god of cunning.

=== Design and voice ===
Savathûn's Throne World was conceived as a reflection of her mind, with an older Hive realm being rebuilt through the Light. Tsai described its castle, unreconstructed swamps and underground areas. Bungie's universe lead concept artist Dima Goryainov said the abandoned swamp represented her former association with Darkness, while the illuminated castle represented her rebirth. The swamp's mud, roots and oppressive atmosphere were intended to suggest being consumed, as Savathûn had been.

Savathûn is voiced by Debra Wilson.

== Appearances ==
Savathûn's background appears in the "Books of Sorrow", a collection of lore entries introduced in Destiny: The Taken King. Originally named Sathona, she lives on Fundament with her siblings Aurash and Xi Ro, who become Oryx and Xivu Arath. After their father's assassination, the siblings flee. Guided by a worm inherited from their father, they descend into Fundament and make a pact with the Worm Gods, becoming the founders of the Hive.

In Destiny 2, Savathûn is responsible for the Dreaming City's recurring curse and the Endless Night affecting humanity's Last City. In the 2021 Season of the Lost, she reveals that she has been impersonating the former Vanguard Commander Osiris since the events of the Season of the Hunt.

In The Witch Queen, Savathûn leads the Lucent Brood, Hive warriors who wield the Light and can be resurrected by Ghosts. The player's Guardian investigates her Throne World to discover how she obtained the Light. The investigation instead helps Savathûn restore memories she lost upon resurrection, as she had planned: Savathûn previously arranged for Mara Sov to remove the worm within her, escaping afterward but dying from her injuries. A Ghost named Immaru encounters her body and resurrects her with the Light. The Guardian also discovers that aeons ago, the Witness had deceived her and her siblings into accepting the Worm Gods' pact. Savathûn attempts to seal the Traveler, the source of the Light, within her realm, claiming that she can protect it from Darkness. The Guardian kills her, but Immaru escapes.

Savathûn returns in the 2023 Season of the Witch. The Guardians seek her knowledge of how to follow the Witness into the Traveler. Immaru resurrects her, and Eris Morn immediately kills her to acquire the power needed to sever Xivu Arath's connection to her Throne World. Immaru revives Savathûn again. She subsequently leaves him in the Vanguard's custody as a guarantee of her cooperation. In The Final Shape, she joins the allied assault against the Witness.

== Reception ==
Austin Wood of GamesRadar+ called Savathûn Destiny 2's best villain, praising her introduction across successive seasons and the weekly conversations that established her motives and the stakes of the story. Before The Witch Queen was released, Phil Hornshaw of GameSpot praised her gradual introduction through the consequences of her schemes. He proposed that she might be manipulating humanity into becoming her allies rather than preparing to destroy it.

Reviewing The Witch Queen, Matt Miller of Game Informer called Savathûn a "wily and intriguing villain" and enjoyed seeing her plans revealed after the preceding buildup. He particularly praised the expansion's treatment of character motives and moral questions, which challenged the series' earlier division between Light and Darkness.

Hornshaw argued that Savathûn's resurrection raised questions about the player's actions. Like human Guardians, she receives the Light and loses her memories when resurrected. He questioned whether holding her responsible for her previous life was consistent with the treatment of other Guardians, particularly Crow, the resurrected Uldren Sov. He also questioned the assumption that humanity's possession of the Light established its moral superiority over the Hive. Discussing her return in 2023, he interpreted her provision of Immaru as a hostage as an attempt to establish trust, while stressing that cooperation had not made her repentant.

Sam Chandler of Shacknews praised Wilson's ability to make Savathûn sound both trustworthy and dangerous. GamesRadar+ included her in its list of the best video game villains, praising the anticipation of her appearance and Wilson's delivery of her manipulative dialogue.

In July 2025, Andy Chalk of PC Gamer reported that players recognised Savathûn's voice when Wilson temporarily voiced Ikora Rey in Destiny 2: The Edge of Fate. He considered the association distracting. Bungie announced that it was re-recording dialogue affected by performers' earlier unavailability.

== Promotion and merchandise ==
Ahead of the August 2021 The Witch Queen showcase, Bungie suggested that Savathûn stood approximately 21 feet (6.4 m) tall. Shaun Prescott of PC Gamer compared her with Lady Dimitrescu from Resident Evil Village, noting that Savathûn was more than twice her height. Marc Deschamps of ComicBook.com also discussed the comparison and questioned whether Savathûn would attract a similar response from players.

In February 2022, Numskull Designs opened pre-orders for a statue of Savathûn, with shipping expected later that year.
