= Destiny 2: The Witch Queen =

2022 expansion of Destiny 2

- Cover art, featuring three Guardians being looked upon by Savathûn, The Witch Queen, within her Throne World
- Developer: Bungie
- Publisher: Bungie
- Director: Joe Blackburn
- Composers: Michael Salvatori; Skye Lewin; Josh Mosser; Michael Sechrist; Rotem Moav; Pieter Schlosser
- Series: Destiny
- Platforms: PlayStation 4; PlayStation 5; Stadia; Windows; Xbox One; Xbox Series X/S
- Release: February 22, 2022
- Genres: Action role-playing, first-person shooter
- Mode: Multiplayer

Destiny 2: The Witch Queen is a major expansion for Destiny 2, a first-person shooter video game by Bungie. Representing the sixth expansion and the fifth year of extended content for Destiny 2, it was originally planned for release in late 2021, but due to the impact of the COVID-19 pandemic, the expansion was delayed by three months and was released on February 22, 2022. Prior to release, Bungie reported that The Witch Queen had over 1 million pre-orders, "on track to becoming the most pre-ordered expansion in Destiny 2 history".

The expansion revolves around Savathûn, The Witch Queen, the sister of Oryx, who was the antagonist of the original Destiny's (2014) first major expansion, The Taken King (2015). The expansion added weapon crafting to the game where players can obtain weapon patterns of existing weapons to craft their own versions with chosen perks to fit to their own play style. Other new content across the game includes new missions, Player versus Environment locations, Player versus Player maps, player gear, weaponry, and a new raid. Two new dungeons and a reprised raid, "King's Fall" from The Taken King, were released over the course of the year. The Witch Queen had four seasonal content offerings for Year 5 of the game: Season of the Risen, which was available alongside the expansion, Season of the Haunted in May, Season of Plunder in August, and Season of the Seraph in December, which ran until the launch of the next expansion, Lightfall, on February 28, 2023. With the release of Lightfall, this seasonal content was removed from the game with the exception of the respective battlegrounds activities from Season of the Risen and Season of the Seraph, which were incorporated into the Vanguard Operations playlist. The Expeditions from Season of Plunder were re-added in September 2025 as a fireteam ops activity, while Nightmare Containment from Season of the Haunted and Ketchcrash from Season of Plunder were re-added as arena activities in December 2025.

The seasons bridged the events of The Witch Queen to the next expansion, Lightfall. Immediately following The Witch Queen's campaign, Season of the Risen centered on an uneasy alliance between the Vanguard and Empress Caiatl's Cabal to combat Savathûn’s Light-bearing Hive. Season of the Haunted saw Empress Caiatl and the Vanguard team up with Eris Morn to stop Caiatl's father, the exiled emperor Calus, with the Guardian returning to an Egregore-infested Leviathan ship, now in the orbit of Earth's Moon, where the Guardian severed Calus's psychic connection to the Lunar Pyramid ship. In Season of Plunder, the Kell of Darkness Eramis escaped her Stasis prison and gathered rogue Fallen pirate crews to plunder the system for powerful relics of the Witness, with the Guardian teaming up with Mithrax, his daughter Eido, The Drifter, and The Spider to stop her. Season of the Seraph then saw the Guardian help Ana Bray, Osiris, and the Exo Stranger rebuild the Warmind, Rasputin, as they raced against Xivu Arath and the Witness, who were trying to hijack the orbital Warsat network to destroy the Traveler.

== Gameplay ==
The Witch Queen introduces a new location, Savathûn's Throne World, above Mars within the Ascendant Realm. In addition to world activities, a new raid, "Vow of the Disciple", was released on March 5, 2022. Two additional dungeons were also added over the course of the expansion, but requires the purchase of a dungeon key. The "King's Fall" raid from the original Destiny's (2014) The Taken King expansion was added on August 26, 2022, during Season 18 and is free for all players to access. It features the same story as the original, but accounts for differences in Destiny 2, such as gameplay mechanics and Champion enemies, as well as a new starting instance to replace the absent Dreadnaught destination that had been present in The Taken King (players begin the raid in the Court of Oryx area like the original, but cannot explore the Dreadnaught beyond this area). New and existing story content was expanded with a new "Legendary" difficulty, designed to be challenging for single players but with improved rewards for completing. At the same time, some content from the Forsaken (2018) expansion was removed from the game and placed in the Destiny Content Vault; this included the full Forsaken campaign, the Tangled Shore destination and its activities, but not the Dreaming City, the Last Wish raid, the Shattered Throne dungeon, or the strikes. Ahead of this, Forsaken's campaign was made free-to-play for all players on December 7, 2021, with a bundle pack available to purchase to access the endgame content for players who did not already own Forsaken. While the other seasonal activities from Beyond Light (2020) were removed with The Witch Queen, the Battlegrounds activity from Season of the Chosen (Season 13) was merged with the existing strikes under one playlist, named Vanguard Operations.

Savathûn's Lucent Brood, Hive warriors that carry the power of Light, is a new major enemy within The Witch Queen. They have similar Light-focused abilities within the Arc, Solar, and Void classes as the players' Guardian characters as well as their own Ghosts that can resurrect them unless the Guardians can destroy the Ghost within a limited window.

Beyond Light introduced Stasis as a power of Darkness which, unlike the other three powers of Light which each had three subtrees that could be selected, used customizable Aspects and Fragments to give the player more customization of how Stasis could be used. Over the course of Year 5, Bungie brought similar Aspects and Fragments to the original Light powers, starting with Void at the launch of The Witch Queen, followed by Solar in Season of the Haunted (Season 17), then Arc in Season of Plunder (Season 18). These changes maintain the basic abilities but allow players to modify and mix effects atop these powers. Bungie stated that additional Darkness powers would be introduced after they had completed the Light power conversion within The Witch Queen (the next Darkness power was introduced with the next expansion, Lightfall, the following year).

The Witch Queen introduces a new weapon type, the glaive, which has both melee and short-range attacks as well as defensive capabilities. Unlike most other weapon drops which have randomized perks, glaives have abilities that can be customized by the player through a new weapon crafting system, which can also be used to craft other types of weapons. Game director Joe Blackburn stated it would not be similar to weapon crafting in massively multiplayer online games, it would not favor experienced players with numerous existing resources over novice players, and would not have pay to win-style mechanics. Blackburn stated this crafting system would allow players to customize a weapon to their playstyle or to shift a weapon within the game's changing meta without having to "farm" for a new version of the weapon. The new Deepsight ability also plays a role in the new weapon crafting system. Players craft weapons at a new location called The Enclave, located on Mars (accessible from within the Throne World location). To craft weapons, players need to obtain weapon patterns (blueprints) from the world or through in-game activities or quests, as well as find and use special "Deepsight Resonance" weapons to unlock and extract crafting materials. Crafting materials can also be purchased from Master Rahool and obtained from Banshee-44 upon accumulating specific amounts of "gunsmith reputation", which is gained from dismantling weapons and armor. Once a weapon has been crafted, it can then be further upgraded and modified through use in gameplay, unlocking new and enhanced perks. Players also have the ability to further customize their crafted weapons by obtaining cosmetic "Mementos" from certain activities. A weapon can be crafted and modified indefinitely, so as long as the weapon patterns, crafting materials, weapon perks and other necessary resources are obtained and unlocked for use. Bungie stated that the initial weapons from The Witch Queen and its raid and seasonal content, including some exotic weapons, would be the only weapons that can be crafted, but plan to include legacy weapons from previous releases in future seasons. For example within Season of the Seraph, weapons from the Deep Stone Crypt raid, introduced in the prior expansion Beyond Light, became craftable.

Other significant gameplay changes include:

- The seasonal artifact, which provides unique mods and bonus power levels across all characters on a player's account for a season as introduced in Shadowkeep (2019), continued to be used in The Witch Queen, but players could unlock all 25 mods instead of only being able to choose 12, though each mod beyond the 12th had an increasing experience cost to obtain.
- The cost to switch element type on armor was significantly reduced to primarily glimmer (the normal in-game currency) and an upgrade module. This change was intended to reduce the need for players to keep a range of armor in their inventory and vaults to cover the different elements.
- Orbs of Power are no longer generated from performing multikills with a masterworked weapon, but instead are generated by a set of helmet mods that generate orbs when a weapon of the same element or type as the mod is used to create multikills. This was to tie into the new weapon crafting system.
- Once the player reaches the "soft limit" power level with The Witch Queen (which was 1500 at the start of the expansion), rare quality (blue) engrams that drop from playlist activities automatically convert to in-game currency (glimmer), rather than flooding the player's inventory. Rare quality engrams still drop before the soft cap is reached to help with leveling.
- Starting with Season 17, Bungie streamlined the weapon crafting system by removing the Ruinous, Mutable, Adroit, Energetic, and Drowned Element crafting materials. Creating and modifying weapons then only required Neutral Element (renamed as Resonant Element), Drowned Alloys (renamed as Harmonic Alloys as of Season 18), Resonant Alloys, and Ascendant Alloys.
- Starting with Season 17, Bungie introduced raid and dungeon rotators. While the most recent raid and dungeon continue to remain a source for pinnacle gear, the rotators cycle through the older raids and dungeons still in the game on a weekly basis, with the opportunity to earn pinnacle gear from that activity. Furthermore, for the current raid or dungeon in rotation, the normal per-weekly lockouts on gear are removed to allow these to be farmable.
- Also in Season 17, the Iron Banner competitive PvP mode was reworked, based on narrative changes to Lord Saladin's character from Season of the Risen, in which he had become part of the Cabal War Council and named as Valus Forge, bringing ideas from his time with the Cabal into the event. It now uses a reward-based progression system similar to Vanguard Ops, Crucible, Gambit, and Trials of Osiris. Furthermore, Iron Banner was changed to only be featured twice per season, while the base game mode (formerly Control) rotates each season, with Season 17 starting with the capture-the-flag game mode Rift from the original Destiny (which was put into rotation in Season 18). Power level advantages were also disabled. Zone Control (also from the original game) also returned as part of the Crucible Labs playlist during Season 17. A separate Triumph Seal was also added for Iron Banner.
- Also with Season 17, seasonal event challenges and Triumph Seals were introduced for each seasons' respective limited-time event, starting with Solstice in Season 17. One overall Triumph Seal was also added for completing a minimum of 16 challenges from each seasons' respective event.
- Starting in Season 19, existing planetary resources were phased out to simplify the currency systems. The need for planetary resources was removed from the cost of some in-game items, and while these resources can still be collected on the various planets, they are automatically converted to glimmer and experience, similar to how these apply on the Throne World. As these could also be traded for glimmer, the game increases potential glimmer rewards from certain activities like public events.
- Also starting in Season 19, casual PvP playlists were simplified. The Control and Clash modes were merged into a Quickplay 6v6 playlist, while the weekly rotating modes Momentum Control, Mayhem, Team Scorched, Rift, and Rumble were merged into a Weekly Rotator 6v6/free-for-all playlist. The Crucible Labs playlist remains available. Furthermore, the Quickplay 6v6 playlist is replaced with the Iron Banner playlist during the week Iron Banner is active, while the Crucible Labs playlist is replaced with the Trials of Osiris playlist on the weekends. A brand new seal and title, Glorious, also replaced the Unbroken seal and title.
- Bungie replaced the Glory competitive playlist and ranking with a ladder-based competitive division system and playlist for competitive PvP game modes starting in Season 19. The new competitive division playlist features the Survival, 3v3 Rift, and Showdown game modes, and the ranking system features seven divisions (Copper, Bronze, Silver, Gold, Platinum, Adept, and Ascendant), with three subdivisions within each division. Players at the start of the season participate in a placement series of seven games which determines the division they start off at, and each players' division rating is based on match outcomes, individual performance, as well as team performance (the highest division players could achieve in Season 19 was Gold III, but players can achieve divisions higher than Gold in future seasons). Two out of three matches need to be won in order for a player to be promoted to the next division if they have enough division rating to do so, or for a player to remain in their current division if they lose enough division rating for a demotion to a lower division.
- Midway through Season 19, in preparation for the release of Lightfall, all armor mods excluding raid armor mods and seasonal artifact mods were fully unlocked for all players. In addition, legendary shard costs for Crucible, Gambit, Trials of Osiris, and Iron Banner weapon and gear focusing were reduced to 25 legendary shards (Trials of Osiris Adept weapon focusing was reduced to 50 legendary shards).

=== Seasonal changes ===
In addition to the major story and content added with The Witch Queen, Bungie divided the year into four seasons. With each season, Power Level minimums and caps were raised by 10 Power levels. Each season offered a free-tier and paid-tier season pass to acquire new gear, game currency, and cosmetics, as well as new activities and triumphs associated with those activities, some of which required purchase of the season pass to access. Like the previous year (Year 4), seasonal activities and story missions could be accessed in subsequent seasons for the duration of Year 5 (some triumphs, however, could only be completed during the active season). All but the PsiOps and Heist Battlegrounds were removed from the game when Lightfall launched and put into the Destiny Content Vault, while these Battlegrounds joined the Vanguard Ops playlist. The Expeditions from Season 18 were later re-added as a fireteam ops activity as part of the Ash & Iron major update in September 2025, while Nightmare Containment from Season 17 and Ketchcrash from Season 18 were re-added as arena activities with the Renegades expansion in December 2025.

Season of the Risen (Season 16) began with the launch of The Witch Queen on February 22, 2022. New and existing players' Power levels were increased to the new minimum Power level of 1350, a soft cap of 1500, with the hard Power level cap set to 1550, and the pinnacle reward cap at 1560. The season added the "PsiOps Battlegrounds" activity, in which the player infiltrated Lucent Brood strongholds within Earth's European Dead Zone and Cosmodrome and on Earth's Moon to locate a Lightbearer Hive lieutenant, then enter its mindscape to capture it with the help of Empress Caiatl's Psions. Completing the activity rewarded seasonal weapons and gear with the help of a revamped War Table in the H.E.L.M. The season also introduced an exotic quest called "Vox Obscura" that rewarded a new exotic breech-loaded grenade launcher, the Dead Messenger. completing the Master version of the activity rewarded its catalyst. This activity had players returning to part of the Mars destination from the original Destiny. The seasonal artifact featured during this season was the Synaptic Spear (featuring mods focusing on mid- to long-range weapons and Void abilities).

Season of the Haunted (Season 17) began on May 24, 2022, with the hard Power level cap being raised to 1560, and the pinnacle reward cap at 1570. It featured the return of the Leviathan ship, which previously had been occupied by Emperor Calus, Empress Caiatl's father, and had been corrupted with Darkness, infesting its halls with Nightmares when it arrived in orbit above Earth's Moon to commune with the Lunar Pyramid. The Solar subclasses were updated for this season to match the same aspect and fragment approach used with Stasis and Void. The season introduced two new activities: "Nightmare Containment", in which players patrolled the Leviathan's upper decks to summon Nightmares and destroy them; and "Sever", a weekly mission where players infiltrated the Leviathan's Underbelly section to destroy Nightmares conjured by Emperor Calus. The H.E.L.M. was expanded and updated to support these additional activities, while some areas of the original Leviathan raid were fully explorable as new patrol zones. A new dungeon, "Duality", was released on May 27, 2022, and takes place in the mindscape of Emperor Calus. Among new weapons included the return of Trespasser, an exotic sidearm from the original Destiny's Rise of Iron expansion, as well as weapons from the vaulted Menagerie activity from Season of Opulence (Season 7), updated with new perks and are able to be crafted at the Mars Relic. The seasonal artifact featured during this season was the Nightmare Harvester (featuring mods focusing on close- to mid-range weapons and Solar abilities).

Season of Plunder (Season 18) began on August 23, 2022, with the hard Power level cap being raised to 1570, and the pinnacle reward cap at 1580. It featured the return of Mithrax, Kell of Light, his daughter Eido, and the Spider who teamed up with the Drifter and the player Guardian to raid Fallen pirate ships led by the newly thawed Eramis, Kell of Darkness (last seen during Beyond Light) and her Fallen pirate lords. The Arc subclasses were updated for this season to match the same aspect and fragment approach used with Stasis, Void, and Solar. The season introduced three new activities: "Ketchcrash", in which 6 players engaged in ship-to-ship space combat; "Expedition", where 3 players assembled treasure maps and searched for treasure while fending off Fallen and Cabal enemies; and "Pirate Hideouts", a weekly mission where players invaded pirate lairs throughout the Solar System in search for treasure. The season also saw the return of the "King's Fall" raid from the original Destiny's The Taken King expansion. In addition to brand new weapons including those from the reprised "King's Fall" raid, the weapons introduced in the Bungie 30th Anniversary Pack were updated with new perks and are now able to be crafted at the Mars Relic. The seasonal artifact featured during this season was the Skeleton Key (featuring mods focusing on mid- to long-range weapons and Arc abilities).

Season of the Seraph (Season 19) began on December 6, 2022, with the hard Power level cap being raised to 1580, and the pinnacle reward cap at 1590. Serving as a prelude to Lightfall, the season featured the return of the Warmind Rasputin, whose consciousness was placed into an engram by Ana Bray following his deactivation by the Black Fleet during Season of Arrivals, and the Guardian worked with her to restore Rasputin into an Exo body while fending off Xivu Arath's Hive and Wrathborn forces. The season introduced a new, 3-player matchmade activity called "Heist Battlegrounds", where Guardians infiltrated Warmind facilities on Earth's Moon, Europa, and Mars and destroyed Wrathborn forces within them to obtain Rasputin's submind data. A new exotic quest, "Operation: Seraph's Shield", was added on December 20, 2022, that rewarded a new craftable exotic pulse rifle, Revision Zero; its multiple catalysts could be obtained over multiple weekly runs of the quest. A new dungeon, "Spire of the Watcher", was released on December 9, 2022, and takes place in a Seraph spire facility on Mars. Tied to the season was the introduction of the annual "Moments of Triumph", which featured triumphs across the various content from The Witch Queen and its four seasons. In addition to brand new weapons introduced this season, the weapons featured from the Warmind expansion as well as the "Deep Stone Crypt" raid from Beyond Light were updated with new perks and are now able to be crafted at the Mars Relic. The seasonal artifact featured during this season was the Seraph Cipher (featuring mods focusing on mid- to long-range weapons and Void, Arc, and Stasis abilities).

== Plot ==
Background

The Witch Queen centers on the titular Savathûn, who along with her siblings Oryx, the Taken King, and Xivu Arath, the Hive God of War, lead the Hive, an undead species that serve the Worm Gods and are closely aligned with the behavior of the Darkness and its Pyramids of the Black Fleet. The Hive follow the Sword Logic, a religious belief that living beings can only justify their existence to live through combat, a tenet that is diametrically opposite to that of the Light, the Traveler, and those that have allied with it, including humanity and the Vanguard.

Unlike her siblings' focus on combat, Savathûn's methods to serve the Worm Gods has been based on subterfuge and trickery, and had taken steps to prevent the Vanguard from contacting the Darkness as it entered the Solar System (as depicted during Season of Arrivals). During the events of Beyond Light a year ago, Savathûn had further manipulated the Vanguard. She claimed to have rescued a weakened Osiris from Xivu Arath from within the Ascendant Realm. She then took his form to influence the Vanguard into taking in Crow and making strategic alliances with factions of the Cabal and Eliksni. During Season of the Lost, Savathûn revealed her true form but was held captive by Queen Mara Sov of the Reef. She made a deal with Mara: she helped to recover the lost Techeuns from the Ascendant Realm and returned Osiris in exchange for Mara's protection from Xivu Arath and her freedom from the Worm Gods, a deal that the Vanguard were wary of. Mara's ritual was successful with the assistance of her rescued Techeuns and she was able to capture Savathûn's worm, but Savathûn herself escaped, leaving behind the real (but unconscious) Osiris.

Plot

Shortly after Mara's ritual at the end of Season of the Lost, the planet Mars has suddenly reappeared after being taken by the Darkness over a year ago at the end of Season of Arrivals. The Vanguard and Ikora Rey's Hidden (intelligence agents) explore the planet. Ikora and Eris Morn discover evidence of more Darkness artifacts sent by the Pyramids, including the appearance of temporal distortions throughout the planet. They find nearby Cabal activity looking to destroy Savathûn's Hive ship, and the player's Guardian instead uses a Cabal weapon to board the ship and chase down Savathûn. Aboard, they discover that Savathûn is now able to wield the power of Light and used that to infuse her Hive warriors, known as the Lucent Brood, with powers similar to that of the Guardians. After defeating a Lightbearer Knight and destroying its Ghost, the Guardian is lured into Savathûn's Throne World, where they eventually face Savathûn herself, who escapes and expels the Guardian from her Throne World.

The Guardian ends up back on Mars where they communicate with Ikora, bewildered over Savathûn stealing the Light for herself and for her Hive warriors, and the increasingly blurred morality between Light and Darkness. Noticing a Darkness artifact the Guardian obtained from Savathûn's ship, Ikora asks them to visit the nearby Pyramid Relic, a structure that appeared on Mars when the planet returned and has the ability to unlock and manifest memories of any given object. The Guardian activates the Relic by using the artifact, which gives them a power of the Darkness called Deepsight. Ikora then orders the Guardian to return to Savathûn's Throne World to search for more answers, while giving the Guardian the Synaptic Spear, a Cabal artifact infused with Light-suppression technology, to aid them in the battles to come.

Returning to the Throne World, the Guardian is contacted by Fynch, a Hive Ghost who regrets joining Savathûn's forces and has refused to revive his Hive Lightbearer. Fynch tells the Guardian to investigate Xivu Arath's temple in the Throne World, where they find the shell of Sagira, Osiris' Ghost (who sacrificed herself to save his life at the beginning of Season of the Hunt). Upon recovering Sagira's shell, the Guardian's Deepsight power triggers a psychic imprint, revealing an old memory of Savathûn discussing a mysterious being called “the Witness”. Believing that the Guardian's new power may uncover more secrets, Ikora asks them to return to the Pyramid on Europa. There, the Guardian battles Cabal forces who have defected from Empress Caiatl's army to search for trinkets of Darkness, and eventually reaches the Darkness statue in the Pyramid and communes with it, enhancing their Deepsight ability. Returning to Mars, Ikora informs the Guardian of a location in the Throne World with a high concentration of psychic energy called the Altar of Reflection, and instructs them to take Sagira's shell there. At the Altar, using Deepsight, they use Sagira's shell to fully uncover Savathûn's memory, which reveals that the Witness is the entity controlling the Pyramids, and that Savathûn used her time in disguise as Osiris to learn something about the Light.

Afterwards, Fynch tips the Guardian off to a possible lead within a temple to Oryx in the Throne World. The Guardian heads to the temple, where they battle against one of Oryx's former soldiers, Alak-Hul, resurrected as a Lightbearer Hive. Upon defeating Alak-Hul, the Guardian recovers a piece of the Tablets of Ruin, used by Oryx to create the Taken; the Guardian uncovers a second memory from Savathûn at the Altar, where she reveals that the Witness has the power to move worlds between different realities, and that she intends to move the Traveler to her Throne World and seal it away. After reporting to Ikora, the Guardian follows up on another lead from Fynch and travels to the temple of Sathona (Savathûn's previous form prior to her transformation into a Hive god). The Guardian finds Sathona's statue, holding onto a worm familiar. With no other objects of interest, the Guardian recovers the familiar, which triggers an illusion of an Ahamkara. The Guardian defeats the illusion of the wish-dragon, then escapes the temple with the worm familiar. However, the Altar of Reflection refuses to let the Guardian enter with the worm, forcing them to reconvene with Ikora.

On Mars, Commander Zavala confronts Ikora on keeping the investigation secret from him. Ikora, unable to trust in her judgment, takes a temporary leave. Eris informs the Guardian of a new lead from Mara Sov. The Guardian enters the apothecary wing of Savathûn's palace, where they are instructed to recover a crystal shard which was part of Mara's spell to imprison Savathûn in the Dreaming City during Season of the Lost. The Guardian recovers the shard, which allows them to enter the Altar again. They then uncover the memory, revealing that some time after escaping the Dreaming City, Savathûn died in the outskirts of the Last City, only to be willingly resurrected by the Traveler. Savathûn then appears before the Guardian, thanking them for helping her remember her past life, before attempting to kill them.

The Guardian escapes and returns to the Tower, where they attend a meeting with the Vanguard and brief Zavala on the revelation. Ikora resolves to stop Savathûn at all costs, in spite of the Traveler's action. She later deduces that the worm familiar object recovered from Sathona's statue may have been the actual familiar of her father, the Osmium King, calcified from age. She then takes the familiar to the Relic on Mars, which reveals a memory of young Sathona prior to the Traveler's arrival on her homeworld of Fundament. Billions of years ago, the Worm Gods were sealed in the core of Fundament while the Traveler prepared to grant the Krill (precursors of the Hive) a Golden Age, as it would later do for the Eliksni and humanity. The memory depicts the Witness, through the worm familiar, coming up with a plan to trick Sathona and her sisters, Aurash and Xi Ro, into freeing the Worm Gods by framing the Traveler for an imminent cataclysm, leading to birth of the Hive and the ascension of Sathona, Aurash, and Xi Ro into the Hive gods Savathûn, Oryx, and Xivu Arath, respectively.

Ikora informs the Guardian that Savathûn is already performing a ritual to pull the Traveler into her Throne World and seal it away, and instructs them to use Sathona's memory to disrupt her ritual. The Guardian arrives in the Throne World and battles the Lucent Hive and the Scorn, before finally facing Savathûn once more. At the ritual site, the Guardian kills Savathûn's Threadweavers, severing their web that connects to the Traveler, then unveils Sathona's memory, which confuses and enrages Savathûn. With the tables turned on the Witch Queen, the Guardian engages in one final showdown with Savathûn and successfully kills her. In her dying breath, Savathûn smugly warns the Guardian and Ghost that the Witness is coming. Savathûn's Ghost, Immaru, manages to escape as the Traveler is returned to Earth. Meanwhile, somewhere in space, the Witness prepares the Black Fleet for one final assault on the Solar System.

Following Savathûn's defeat, the Vanguard recovers her remains, while the Guardian continues to work with Fynch to further disrupt Lucent Hive activity led by Immaru. Fynch reveals to Ikora and the Guardian that Savathûn keeps a wellspring of Light energy, which she uses to distribute Light to her Brood. Ikora deploys Guardians regularly to attack Hive forces protecting the Wellspring, as well as defend it from Scorn invaders. Mara Sov later arrives on Mars, where she presents the Guardian with Savathûn's dying worm, revealing that the Witch Queen herself was present on behalf of the Witness during the Collapse, and both she and her worm knew of the secret that prevented humanity's end during that event and convinced the Traveler not to flee. Mara proposes reviving the worm by using Hive cryptoglyphs and incubators and giving it a new host, seemingly volunteering for the task herself. Mara sends the Guardian to find the Dark City, a city with Pyramid-like architecture shrouded in Darkness within the Throne World, where the Guardian battles Scorn forces within and finds a set of cryptoglyphs and an incubator, but only manages to partially revive the worm. The Guardian contacts Fynch, who points them toward more incubators hidden around the Throne World. After finding the incubators, the Guardian fully revives the worm, who speaks to them. The worm reveals that Mara plans to kill Eris, Crow, and the Guardian, to which she affirms, but only as a contingency should they fall to the Darkness's control. A curse Savathûn laid on the worm soon triggers, causing its energy to quickly deplete. The Guardian takes the worm to Savathûn's palace and uses Hive wells to heal it, as well as concentrated Hive Light to stabilize the worm; they then meet up with Mara in Xivu Arath's temple, where she infuses the worm into a grenade launcher called Parasite and hands it to the Guardian, who then defends Mara from Scorn forces while she finishes the ritual. Afterwards, the worm reveals that during the Collapse, Savathûn deceived the Witness and sent it away to protect the Traveler, inadvertently preventing humanity's extinction in the process. Mara asks the Guardian to keep the Parasite grenade launcher, and the worm itself, a secret.

Sometime later, a fireteam of Guardians decide to investigate a derelict and broken Pyramid ship in the outskirts of Savathûn's Throne World, where they are contacted by Mara, who warns them that unlike the Pyramids they encountered on the Moon and Europa, they are not being beckoned by it. She reveals that the Pyramid is home to a Disciple of the Witness; the Disciples are extremely powerful entities of Darkness who directly serve the Witness. With Savathûn defeated, the Disciple now wishes to take control of the Throne World from within the Pyramid by using the Scorn ("Vow of the Disciple" raid). Rhulk, Disciple of the Witness, contacts the Guardians as they approach the Pyramid and beckons them into it. Upon entering the Pyramid after escorting a Darkness barge through a swamp filled with Scorn forces, the Guardians fight their way through, activating obelisks of Darkness and eventually defeating the Caretaker, an empowered Scorn Abomination that was a successful result of an experiment by Rhulk using worm larvae produced by a catatonic Worm God named Xita; it is revealed that Rhulk had used Xita to produce worm larvae for Savathûn's Hive and for his experiments on the Scorn. The Guardians also discover that the Pyramid hosted a twisted, museum-like collection of artifacts, murals, and experiments curated by Rhulk himself, including a massive rib bone taken from the Leviathan of Fundament (an ally of the Traveler), as well as calcified and dissected worm larvae and Scorn. Soon after battling through legions of Scorn and Taken using artifacts of Light and Darkness, the Guardians eventually reach the heart of the Pyramid, atop a massive Darkness superweapon called the Upended, powered by the catatonic Xita, where they are greeted by Rhulk himself, revealed to be a mysterious yet bloodthirsty alien entity, who attacks them. After an arduous battle, the Guardians kill Rhulk once and for all, eliminating a major threat of the Witness.

Shortly after Rhulk's defeat, the Guardian returns to Fynch, who congratulates them on their efforts in defeating the Disciple of the Witness, but warns them that the Scorn may be seeking an opportunity to seize control of the Pyramid. Fynch advises the Guardian to return to the Pyramid and defend it from Scorn forces seeking to plunder the secrets within. The Guardian then returns to the Enclave on Mars and finds a note left by Mara Sov on the Hidden's evidence board, confirming the situation. The Guardian returns to the Pyramid, where they discover that the Scorn are attempting to empower themselves using a combination of worm larvae and the Darkness from the Pyramid. After wiping out the Scorn forces, the Guardian takes the opportunity to learn more about the origins of Rhulk, revealed to be the last surviving member of a warrior alien species from the planet Lubrae, and was taken in by the Witness as its first Disciple after he annihilated his entire planet of all life. It is also revealed that Rhulk played a major role in the creation of the Hive; upon meeting the Worm Gods in the core of Fundament and subjugating them to the Witness, Rhulk had created a strain of worm larvae from the imprisoned Xita that would be implanted into the Krill, turning them into Hive. The Guardian is then deployed to the Pyramid regularly by Mara to protect it from the Scorn and keep it under Vanguard control.

=== Season of the Risen ===
Shortly after the Guardian's skirmish with the Cabal attacking Savathun's ship on Mars, the Guardian returns to the Tower where they witness a tense meeting between Zavala, Lord Saladin, Crow, and Empress Caiatl, in response to the death of her soldiers on Mars. Since the Cabal attacked the Guardian first, and hoping to put the incident behind them, Zavala explains to Caiatl that the Lucent Brood have begun to invade the Solar System from Savathûn's Throne World and requests for her help, to which she agrees. The Guardian then meets with Caiatl and Saladin in the H.E.L.M., where they request the Guardian to engage in psychic warfare against the Lucent Hive by using the Synaptic Spear given to them by Ikora. Using the Spear, the Guardian infiltrates one of the Lucent Hive's strongholds in the European Dead Zone, leading them to a Lucent Hive lieutenant, Mor'ak, Lightstealer. After weakening the Hive lieutenant, Caiatl's Psions capture it and they send the Guardian into its mindscape to sever its connection to the Light. After successfully crippling the lieutenant, the Guardian then transports it back to the H.E.L.M., where Saladin contacts the Guardian again and reveals that the Lucent Hive are now going after Guardians to drain them of their Light for unknown purposes. He advises the Guardian to continue to capture more Lucent Hive lieutenants until they can better understand their motives.

After capturing a second Hive lieutenant, Uul'nath, Lightcleanser, in the Cosmodrome, the Guardian witnesses Saladin and Crow argue in the H.E.L.M. over the ethics of their actions against the Hive. Crow, who is still recovering after Savathûn invaded his mind, suggests that the Hive lieutenants should be killed out of mercy rather than being probed for information; Saladin, despite disagreeing with the Vanguard and the Cabal's method, affirms that they should not show kindness toward the Hive. Later, Saladin speaks with the Guardian and expresses his concern over Crow's mentality. Over the course of the operation, Saladin also begins to understand and empathize with the Cabal, no longer showing aggression toward his former enemies.

Eventually, Saladin learns that the Lucent Hive intends to take control of the Scarlet Keep on Earth's Moon from Xivu Arath's forces, in order to perform a ritual and manifest Savathûn's Throne World on the Moon. The Guardian arrives on the Moon to stop the ritual, though the Vanguard is unable to contact Crow for recon assistance. Nevertheless, the Guardian succeeds in capturing the Lucent Hive lieutenant, Korosek, Thronebringer, in charge of the ritual. They later return to the H.E.L.M. with Saladin, and learn that Crow attempted to shut down the psychic analysis machinery housing the Hive lieutenants, inadvertently killing Caiatl's Psion emissary in the process. Caiatl later confronts the Vanguard and demands Crow's life in exchange for the Psion, but Saladin intervenes and offers his own. Caiatl accepts and declares Saladin part of her Cabal War Council, giving him the Bracus rank. Saladin later contacts the Guardian to notify them of his decision, and reveals that he left his axe behind as a message for Crow. Zavala also informs the Guardian that he has decommissioned the psychic analysis program, and has suggested to Caiatl to continue gathering dead Lucent Hive lieutenants for incineration.

Amidst the ongoing operation, Caiatl requests the Guardian to investigate a rogue Cabal Psion faction who is spreading Darkness-inspired propaganda. As she is unable to send her own soldiers, she relies on the Vanguard to deal with the rebel faction. The Guardian returns to Mars and clears out the Psion faction's stronghold and takes out its leader, Qabix, the Insurgent. Deciphering the propaganda broadcast, Caiatl learns that her father, Emperor Calus, has aligned himself with the Black Fleet and the Witness, and is funding the Psion faction to recruit surviving Red Legion soldiers into the Black Fleet, promising them salvation. Over the following weeks, the Guardian is asked to return to the rebel stronghold and continue disrupting the Psions' broadcasts, where they learn of their leader Yirix is responsible for the attempted assassination on Zavala's life during Season of the Chosen as revenge on the Guardians for thwarting the Psion Flayers' efforts with the Sundial on Mercury during Season of Dawn and the Cabal's attempt to crash the Almighty in the Last City during Season of the Worthy.

=== Season of the Haunted ===
Following the abrupt end of the Lucent Hive psychic analysis program and Lord Saladin's integration into Empress Caiatl's War Council, the Vanguard discovers that the Leviathan, the exiled Cabal emperor Calus’s flagship, has suddenly reappeared in the Solar System in orbit above Earth's Moon and is attempting to commune with the Lunar Pyramid. In response to Emperor Calus's return and the threat from his newfound allegiance to the Black Fleet and the Witness, the Vanguard sends the H.E.L.M., revealed to be a mobile command ship, to the Moon's orbit, and the Guardian is then tasked by Commander Zavala and Eris Morn to investigate the Leviathan. Exploring the now derelict Leviathan, the Guardian finds it overrun by Darkness and infested with Egregore, (Darkness fungal growths), as well as Nightmares generated from the Lunar Pyramid. One particular Nightmare, taking on the form of Zavala's deceased wife Safiyah, lures the Guardian to Calus's throne room, where they are ambushed by Darkness-powered Loyalist Cabal and Nightmares; they escape the Leviathan and reconvene with Zavala, Eris, Empress Caiatl, and Crow in the H.E.L.M.

In the H.E.L.M., Eris explains to Caiatl about the Nightmares infesting the Leviathan and that she is able to provide protection through a Hive séance ritual involving the Crown of Sorrow, now under Eris's control, and an artifact of her creation called the Nightmare Harvester, but Caiatl refuses to get involved due to Eris's usage of Hive magic. Eris then performs the séance ritual with Zavala, Crow, and the Guardian to bind them to each other and to the Crown of Sorrow, which also manifests the Nightmares of Safiyah, Uldren Sov, and even Dominus Ghaul that begin to haunt Zavala, Crow, and Caiatl, respectively. The Guardian is then given the powered Nightmare Harvester to help contain the Nightmares haunting the Leviathan and bind them to the Crown of Sorrow. After the Guardian contains several Nightmares from the Leviathan's Castellum into the Nightmare Harvester, both the Guardian and Crow head to the Leviathan's Underbelly section to perform a severance ritual in order to weaken Calus's connection with the Pyramid; Crow, however, is continuously haunted by the Nightmare of Uldren, who derides Crow for his actions in his past life. Upon arriving in the Leviathan's Gauntlet, Crow performs the severance ritual and summons the Nightmare of Fikrul, the Fanatic. The Guardian manages to destroy the Nightmare of the Fanatic but the severance ritual fails due to Crow resisting the Nightmare of Uldren. Eventually, Crow and the Guardian return to the Underbelly to attempt the severance ritual again, and is finally successful, with the Nightmare of Uldren transforming into the Memory of Uldren, successfully weakening Emperor Calus's connection with the Pyramid. Back at the H.E.L.M., Crow explains to the Guardian that acknowledging and accepting responsibility for his actions as Uldren Sov made him a stronger and better person and hopes to make amends.

Following Crow's successful severance ritual, Zavala offers to aid in the next severance ritual, but he becomes haunted and distraught by the Nightmare of Safiyah, who blames him for the death of their son Hakim. Though the Guardian defeats the Nightmare of Kethiks, Grief Unforgiven, in the Underbelly, the ritual fails due to Zavala's continued grief. Back at the H.E.L.M., Eris tells the Guardian of Zavala's relationship with Safiyah, whom he had met back during the Dark Age. Zavala had fallen in love with Safiyah, and left Saladin's tutelage to live with and marry her. The two eventually found an infant boy left alive from a Fallen attack, and raised him as their own son, named Hakim. Zavala considered giving up his Light, but one day they were attacked by a Fallen raiding party, where Hakim was killed. Zavala tried to apologize to Safiyah but she claimed there was nothing for Zavala to apologize for, resulting in their divorce. Over time, Zavala tried to apologize to the descendants of Safiyah, leaving him unforgiven and grief-stricken to the present. Eventually, Zavala finds the strength to confront his trauma, and returns to the Underbelly to attempt the severance ritual again with the Guardian by his side. Zavala performs the severance ritual again and is ultimately successful, with the Nightmare of Safiyah transforming into the Memory of Safiyah. Zavala continues to beg for forgiveness over Hakim's death, but Safiyah reassures him that it was never his fault to begin with. The Guardian returns to the H.E.L.M., where Zavala explains that the entire ordeal had made him further question his faith in the Traveler and is contemplating on leaving the Guardian life.

Shortly after Zavala's successful severance ritual, the Guardian and Eris find out that Caiatl is attempting to banish the Nightmare of Dominus Ghaul, who berates her for her ineptitude in leading the Cabal race as empress. The Guardian then receives a message from Caiatl in the H.E.L.M., telling them to not interfere. Nevertheless, the Guardian decides to return to the Underbelly to find Caiatl, where she attempts to perform the severance ritual to banish the Nightmare of Ghaul despite not being bound to the Crown of Sorrow, but ultimately fails despite the Guardian defeating the Nightmare of Ghaul itself. Eris then summons the Guardian to the Moon, where she discovers that Nightmares have once again populated the Scarlet Keep due to Emperor Calus's influence and advises the Guardian to investigate. The Guardian destroys a Nightmare at the Scarlet Keep that is calling out to the Lunar Pyramid, where the Guardian heads to afterwards and finds dead Loyalist Cabal infected with Egregore that were ferrying Calus's mind to the Pyramid. The Guardian then reconvenes with Eris at the H.E.L.M., where she explains that Calus intends take control of the Pyramid and claim its power to aid the Witness in bringing about a second Collapse. Eris later convinces Caiatl to perform the séance ritual in order to eventually sever Calus's final connection to the Pyramid. After performing the séance ritual to bind her to the Crown of Sorrow, Caiatl, with newfound confidence, asks the Guardian to join her in the Underbelly to attempt the severance ritual again, to which she is ultimately successful, with the Nightmare of Ghaul transforming into the Memory of Ghaul. Back at the H.E.L.M., Caiatl contacts the Guardian and thanks them, proving in her confidence that she is a capable leader and that the Cabal will have a brighter future under her reign as empress.

During these events, clan liaison Suraya Hawthorne advises a fireteam of Guardians to personally meet up with Eris in the Leviathan's Tribute Hall, despite Eris herself breaking Vanguard protocol. The Guardians travel to the Tribute Hall and speak with Eris, where she gives them the opportunity to enter the fractured mindscape of Emperor Calus and steal his darkest secrets from him ("Duality" dungeon). The Guardians enter Calus's consciousness via a Hive portal created by Eris, where they fight their way through, splitting between a material realm and a Nightmare realm both representing the exiled Cabal emperor's torment. As the Guardians go deeper into Calus's mind, they defeat the Nightmare of Gahlran, the Sorrow Bearer, and then later unlock a vault in the mindscape which uncovers Calus's past involving his daughter Caiatl, who eventually betrayed him and sent him into exile aboard the Leviathan, which led him to commune with the Darkness and seek the Witness's favor. Eventually, the Guardians arrive at a shrine of Darkness holding a giant Bell of Conquests, where they are greeted by the Nightmare of Caiatl, Princess-Imperial, representing Calus's greatest shame. After defeating the Nightmare of Caiatl, Eris transports the Guardians back to the Tribute Hall, where she states that through his memories, Emperor Calus is seeking to transfigure himself into a Disciple of the Witness to help the Witness bring about the "final shape" of the universe.

The Guardian is then contacted by Eris through the Crown of Sorrow at the H.E.L.M., who discovers that despite the successful severance rituals, Emperor Calus had successfully began to integrate his consciousness into the Lunar Pyramid. With time running out before Calus assumes complete control of the Pyramid, the Guardian, Eris, Crow, Zavala, and Caiatl return to the Leviathan to perform one more severance ritual, this time in the heart of the Pyramid where Calus's consciousness resides. The Guardian fights their way through the Leviathan once more into Calus's throne room, where they enter a portal leading to the heart of the Lunar Pyramid, where they meet up with Caiatl. Caiatl then confronts her father, whose consciousness appears before her and the Guardian and attacks them. With the help of the Memories of Uldren, Safiyah, and Ghaul, the Guardian successfully defeats Calus, but he manages to escape and the Memories fade away as soon as Eris, Crow, and Zavala arrive. The Guardian returns to the H.E.L.M., where Eris comments that despite Emperor Calus's defeat, he is not truly gone as he had fully become a Disciple of the Witness and the harbinger of the second Collapse.

At the conclusion of the season, the Vanguard informs the Guardian that they have lost contact with the H.E.L.M., and sends the Guardian to investigate. The Guardian arrives in the H.E.L.M., now infested with Egregore, where they receive an ominous transmission from Emperor Calus. Calus warns the Guardian that the Witness is coming for the Traveler and cannot be stopped. The Guardian returns to Zavala in the Tower afterwards, who comments that the same message appeared throughout the Last City as well. He advises the Guardian to also prepare for the eventual arrival of the Witness.

=== Season of Plunder ===
Following Emperor Calus's defeat in the Lunar Pyramid, the Guardian is contacted by the Drifter, requesting aid transporting a "shipment" from Europa to the Last City, which was hijacked by the Eliksni of House Salvation. The Guardian lands in Riis-Reborn on Europa and fights through House Salvation forces and finds the shipment, which actually contains the Spider, whom the Drifter was attempting to smuggle into the Eliksni Quarter in the Last City. Spider instructs the Guardian to find his Ketch and wrestle it from House Salvation's control with the help of his crew; however, they discover that the Stasis prison containing Eramis, Kell of Darkness, had been shattered open; Drifter surmises that the Witness had set her free. The Guardian, Spider, and the Drifter return to the Eliksni Quarter in the Last City, where they meet up with Mithrax, Kell of Light, and his daughter Eido, the Scribe of House Light. They confirm that the Witness had broken Eramis out of her Stasis prison and she is now rallying old Eliksni pirate crews under her command to seek out treasures of Darkness for the Witness. The Guardian, the Drifter, Mithrax, Eido, and Spider ultimately decide to team up and take down Eramis and her Fallen pirate crews themselves. Spider allows the Guardian to pilot his Ketch while also allowing them to keep the Skeleton Key that they had obtained while on Europa to aid them in the battles to come.

The Guardian heads to the cleansed H.E.L.M., where they find an Eliksni star chart and a captain's atlas that Mithrax tasks them to use to command Spider's Ketch and their crew. The Guardian takes the Ketch and its crew to assault one of Eramis's Ketches and takes down the privateer manning the ship. After locating buried treasure by using map fragments found in the assaulted Ketch, the Guardian discovers coordinates to a pirate hideout in the Themis Cluster. Traveling to the hideout, they recover a Darkness relic, which they take to the H.E.L.M. for Eido to study. As the Guardian plunders more relics from several pirate hideouts, they return to the Eliksni Quarter, where they overhear a conversation between Spider and Mithrax. Spider tries to goad Mithrax into using the relics, knowing Mithrax's past, but Mithrax angrily refuses and leaves, revealing Spider's real name, Rakis. The Drifter reveals to the Guardian that Eido had attempted to tap into the Darkness powers hidden in the relics, only for Mithrax to stop her from doing so. Mithrax eventually begs the Guardian to not let Eido get involved in the fight against Eramis. Furthermore, tensions rise between Mithrax and Eido as he catches her and Spider confiding in each other. The Guardian eventually discovers that Savathûn's Lucent Hive is also going after the relics.

Mithrax warns the Guardian that Eido has attempted to contact Eramis to parley with her. Eramis agrees to meet with the Guardian, Eido, and Mithrax on a neutral asteroid in the Themis Cluster. With Eido wanting to hear the truth of her father's past and his connection with the relics, Eramis reveals that the relics are that of Nezarec, a former Disciple of the Witness who was entombed in the Lunar Pyramid. When the Eliksni first arrived in the Solar System, they discovered the Lunar Pyramid and found Nezarec's corpse within; taking pieces of his flesh, they used them as relics to empower themselves with Darkness. Mithrax eventually took possession of one of these relics, turning him into a ruthless, bloodthirsty pirate, slaughtering his own crew and kin. Despite being shocked and saddened by the truth of her father revealed to her, Eido advises the Guardian that they must continue retrieving the relics of Nezarec before Eramis does.

Later, Mithrax, having discovered a transmission from Eramis to Eido, asks the Guardian to go after Eido, concerned for his daughter's safety and Eramis's influence on her. The Guardian finds Eido trapped at the last remaining pirate hideout (occupied by Lucent Hive), having gone on her own to find the final relic of Nezarec. The Guardian finds her with the relic as well as Eramis fending off the remaining Lucent Hive. Mithrax arrives soon after and he and Eramis engage in a pirate sword duel; Mithrax ultimately spares Eramis and she escapes. The Guardian then returns to the Eliksni Quarter and speaks with the Drifter, who congratulates the Guardian on their efforts in securing the final relic of Nezarec, stopping whatever plan the Witness had for the relics. Eido contacts the Guardian as they bring the final relic to the H.E.L.M., where she expresses concern that despite her father wanting to use the relics to atone for his dark past, Eido states that using the relics as they are would be dangerous, and both she and her father intend to continue researching into how the relics can be safely used.

At the conclusion of the season, Mithrax begins requesting Guardians to make donations of treasures they have collected across the Solar System to help renovate the Eliksni Quarter. Upon acquiring sufficient donations, the Guardian then travels to the Eliksni Quarter where renovations have begun, from safety and security upgrades to new housing, a community garden, and even a town square. Meanwhile, Mithrax concludes his research and manages to safely extract Nezarec's essence from the relics into a potion, which Saint-14 gives to an unconscious Osiris. Osiris finally awakens from his coma and reunites with Saint-14 as he reveals from Savathûn's memories of a secret power hidden away in a city on Neptune.

=== Season of the Seraph ===
Following the Eliksni Quarter renovations and Osiris’s wake, Ana Bray continues to work on restoring the Warmind Rasputin, which she had saved into an engram just prior to the Darkness's consumption of Mars during Season of Arrivals, and has been unsuccessfully trying to install the Warmind into a specialized Exo frame. At the H.E.L.M., Osiris recalls Savathûn's memories of Neptune and urges Ana to awaken Rasputin to help him interpret the memories. Ana reluctantly turns to her megalomaniacal grandfather, Clovis Bray I, now a living AI in the Braytech Exoscience facility on Europa, and asks the Guardian to help with contacting him. The Guardian finds the Braytech facility overrun with cryptoliths, Hive, and Wrathborn within, indicating that Xivu Arath, the Hive God of War, seeks Clovis as well, and that she had also turned the Fallen of House Salvation into Wrathborn and resurrected dead House Salvation forces into Scorn as Eramis's punishment for her failure to retrieve the relics of Nezarec for the Witness. The Guardian clears the enemies from the facility, allowing Ana to arrive and convince Clovis to help, copying his AI from Europa to Rasputin's Exo frame in the H.E.L.M.

Clovis explains that Rasputin has several subminds located across the Solar System which must be restored before they can complete Rasputin, as well as gain access to the Seraph orbital station above Earth and take control of the Warsat network to help protect the system; he gives the Guardian the Seraph Cipher to aid them in the battles to come. Mara Sov then contacts the Guardian, explaining that she has been monitoring the God of War's movements from within the Ascendant Realm, and warns them that Xivu Arath has sent her forces, to try to claim these subminds for the Witness. The Guardian infiltrates old Warmind facilities on the Moon to defend and secure the submind Malahayati. The Guardian afterwards infiltrates the Warmind launch facility in Twilight Gap, where they restart the auxiliary reactor to access the orbital station, then returns to the H.E.L.M. afterwards, where Clovis advises the Guardian that Rasputin's mindlab in the Hellas Basin on Mars is situated in one of the temporal distortions, and that it contains the submind Charlemagne from a past time period. The Guardian then travels to the Braytech Futurescape campus on Mars, where they drive off Hive, Wrathborn, and Taken forces and secure Charlemagne from its vault within the temporal distortion. They then return to the Warmind launch facility to download new launch codes for Clovis to decrypt in order for the Guardian to reach the orbital station.

The Guardian returns to Clovis in the H.E.L.M. and he advises them that he had fully decrypted the launch codes and that Elsie would assist them in infiltrating the Seraph orbital station. However, despite reintegrating Malahayati and Charlemagne back into Rasputin's code, Rasputin himself would still need to be fully reconstructed through more submind data before he could assume control of the Warsat network. Elsie then contacts the Guardian afterwards, who explains that she and Ana will help them bypass the orbital station's security protocols so that they can upload a virus that will grant Rasputin access to the Warsat network once he is fully restored. Ana also advises the Guardian to locate and secure an old Golden Age weapon that she had found records of in the orbital station before House Salvation can ("Operation: Seraph's Shield" exotic mission). The Guardian returns to the Warmind launch facility where they manage to launch into the orbital station; upon arrival, they fight through House Salvation and Hive forces to the Warmind integration core, where they discover that one of Eramis's former lieutenants, Praksis, was resurrected as a Scorn by the Witness. After defeating Praksis and his Scorn forces, the Guardian uploads the virus into the station's network and recovers the Golden Age pulse rifle Revision Zero as they escape from the station. Clovis then speaks to the Guardian upon their return to the H.E.L.M., who is furious that House Salvation is onboard the station and vows to eradicate them once Rasputin is back online. The Guardian is then contacted by a member of the Hidden who asks the Guardian to take the Revision Zero to the Enclave on Mars and reshape it into its original, more powerful form.

Eventually, Clovis criticizes the pace of the operation, and advises the Guardian that Ana had come up with an idea to expedite Rasputin's restoration despite doubting her plan will work. After the Guardian gathers more submind data, they are contacted by Ana, who reveals that the Iron Lord Felwinter was an Exo who had part of Rasputin's code uploaded into his body, and that the remains of his Ghost, Felspring, should contain integral pieces of Rasputin's code, linguistic data, as well as pieces of Felwinter's personality engram. The Guardian then travels to the Vostok Crucible arena on Felwinter Peak, where Osiris requests the Guardian to relight the flames of the Iron Banner after clearing out House Salvation forces there; he then reveals that Felwinter was once his mentor. The Guardian then enters the Iron Temple, where they find Felspring's remains. Ana uploads Felspring's data core directly to Rasputin, who then speaks (for the first time ever in English) to Ana, Osiris, and the Guardian using Clovis's voice, telling them that Clovis had deceived them all along.

Rasputin reveals that he was built by Clovis Bray I as a weapon to destroy the Traveler so that Rasputin could replace it and become humanity's savior instead. It was only through Ana that Rasputin had gained independent thought and appreciation for humanity, and so Rasputin rewrote Clovis's protocols in order to prevent Clovis from using the Warmind as a weapon. With Clovis already awakened as an AI since the events of Beyond Light, Rasputin states that Clovis seeks to upload his mind into Rasputin's neural network so that he could ascend to godhood. The Guardian returns to the H.E.L.M., where Clovis is confronted by both Ana and Elsie following Rasputin's revelation. Furious at Clovis's deception, Ana uploads Rasputin's engram into the Exo frame, overwriting the Clovis AI with Rasputin himself. The Guardian then speaks to Ana, who is relieved that she had managed to delete Clovis from the Exo frame, knowing the immense consequences for the Last City if Clovis had used Rasputin to integrate himself into the Seraph orbital station. Rasputin, now in full control of the Exo frame, then speaks to the Guardian, who thanks them for saving him, and vows to do everything in his power to protect humanity from the threat of the Witness.

Over the next several weeks, the Guardian continues to gather submind data for Rasputin to aid in his restoration. Upon returning to the H.E.L.M. after gathering more submind data, the Guardian witnesses a conversation between Mara Sov, Rasputin, and Osiris, where Mara reveals that her Techeuns had discovered that Xivu Arath is preparing for a full-scale invasion of Earth through a ritual similar to the one performed on the Cabal homeworld of Torobatl prior to the events of Season of the Chosen, triggered by the usage of the Warsats themselves. The Guardian and Mara then meet with Zavala, Ana, Mithrax, and Caiatl at the Tower for an emergency meeting; as the usage of the Warsats could trigger Xivu Arath's ritual and a full-scale invasion of Earth, Mara suggests to keep the conflict at a stalemate, allowing the restoration of Rasputin to continue while preventing the Warsats from being controlled by either side.

As Rasputin continues to formulate a method of using the Warsats without empowering Xivu Arath, he reveals the existence of highly classified data stored deep in a secret bunker in the Cosmodrome, and asks them to secure the data. Ana questions if she did the right thing by humanizing Rasputin. The Guardian enters the secret bunker and make their way through to reach the terminal containing the classified data. Rasputin confides in the Guardian and expresses remorse over his actions as the Warmind, especially over a protocol that he nearly activated to prevent the Traveler from leaving Earth during the Collapse; he then expresses gratitude for Ana who stopped him from activating the protocol and eventually making him become more than a weapon. After securing the classified data, the Guardian returns to the H.E.L.M., where Rasputin thanks them for their efforts, apologizes for not disclosing the data's existence beforehand, and pledges his decision to trust in humanity.

Meanwhile, Osiris is tipped by a member of the Hidden that a Seraph research facility on Mars, which he had a vision of through Savathûn's memories, had activated for the first time since the Collapse and is under attack by Vex from the Black Garden. Fearing stronger motives than simply controlling Rasputin, Ikora Rey advises a fireteam of Guardians under Osiris's guidance to travel to the research facility to stop the Vex incursion ("Spire of the Watcher" dungeon). The Guardians prevent the submind data from falling into the Witness's control after the near-destruction of the facility’s spire.

At the conclusion of the season, Rasputin learns that Eramis, under the Witness's command, had breached the Warsat network's security protocols and is preparing to use the Warsats against Earth and the Traveler through the Abhorrent Imperative protocol, the same protocol Rasputin nearly activated during the Collapse to prevent the Traveler from leaving; Abhorrent Imperative cannot be stopped once activated. Despite Ana’s objections, Rasputin ultimately decides to sacrifice himself to prevent Eramis from activating the protocol through a self-destruct sequence and sends the Guardian one last time to the Seraph orbital station, which is under attack by House Salvation, Hive forces, and Eramis herself. Arriving at the Warmind integration core, the Guardian uploads Rasputin in his engram form to the station as they fight off Ir Garza, Scourge of Earth. The Traveler begins to depart Earth as the Vanguard, House Light, the Imperial Cabal, and the citizens of the Last City look on, but stops in orbit above Earth as Rasputin goes offline for good to destroy the Warsats, preventing Eramis from invoking Abhorrent Imperative. As Eramis questions the Witness why the Traveler stayed, the Black Fleet is shown passing by Jupiter as the Witness declares to Eramis that the Traveler "has nowhere else to run".

The Guardian returns to the Tower, with the Traveler no longer in view over the Last City. Zavala and Ikora explain that while their worst nightmares of the Traveler leaving almost came true, they would stand and face the end together. Ana mourns Rasputin, recognizing his sacrifice to save humanity was motivated by his own demand to be more than a weapon. The Guardian and Ana then find a pre-recorded message from Rasputin in the Exo frame, revealing from the now decrypted classified data from the Cosmodrome bunker that the city on Neptune from Osiris's visions from Savathûn is real, and it is home to an extremely powerful paracausal artifact connected to the Traveler called the Veil; Rasputin hopes that this knowledge will be used by the Guardian against the Witness to prevent a second Collapse.

The events of Destiny 2: Lightfall follow.

== Development ==
Since Forsaken, Bungie had found a pattern of holding a large major expansion each year along with four seasonal segments within that year for Destiny 2. The Witch Queen had been planned to start Destiny 2's fifth year of content with a target release of November 2021. However, in February 2021, the company confirmed that a combination of delays from the COVID-19 pandemic and the business of the late-2021 release calendar, they had opted to move The Witch Queen to February 2022. The fourth year of content that began with the Beyond Light expansion (November 2020) was in turn extended by three months due to this delay. With the extended time, Bungie announced a special series of events within the game to launch in December 2021 that would celebrate the company's 30th anniversary, featuring weapons, armor, and other cosmetics inspired by their previous games, including Marathon and Halo.

The setting for The Witch Queen, Savathûn's Throne World, was designed to provide a setting for the players as Guardians to solve the mystery of how Savathûn came to gain control of the Light for her Lucent Brood. Inspired by the television show True Detective, the Throne World is based on a swamp-like setting to provide a moody landscape, according to Blackburn, who also said that the campaign would be the action game equivalent of a mystery game. While Bungie does not plan to have a large alternative reality game as they had during Season of Dawn (Season 9), Blackburn said that Bungie does want players to work individually and together to solve the season's mystery.

The basis for Season of the Haunted had originated when the development team was working on the Presage mission during Season of the Chosen from Beyond Light. One idea for the ship, the Glykon, was to have it occupied by Nightmares, leading the narrative team to see connections between what they were creating and the film Event Horizon. While they could not fit in the Nightmare concept for the Presage mission at the time of Season of the Chosen, but when Bungie planned to bring back the Leviathan for Season of the Haunted, the narrative team were able to expand on these ideas further, adding in influences from the films Flatliners and Jacob's Ladder. Missions like the "Sever" activity were then designed to be like horror films, with sections where the player cannot fight off an enemy and forced to run.

The Witch Queen was originally announced alongside Beyond Light (2020), with The Witch Queen and the following expansion, Lightfall, announced for a late 2021 and 2022 release, respectively. When it was announced that The Witch Queen had been delayed to February 2022, Lightfall was also delayed to early 2023, and another expansion, The Final Shape, was announced for early 2024. The latter concluded the first major arc, the "Light and Darkness Saga", that Bungie had planned for Destiny 2, subsequently preparing them to introduce a new arc after The Final Shape.

On February 2, 2022, Bungie announced that The Witch Queen had surpassed 1 million pre-orders, putting it "on track to becoming the most pre-ordered expansion in Destiny 2 history".

== Reception ==
Reception

Aggregate score
Aggregator	Score
Metacritic	(PC) 85/100 (PS5) 87/100 (XSX) 85/100

Review scores
Publication	Score
Game Informer	9/10
GameSpot	9/10
GamesRadar+	4.5/5
Hardcore Gamer	4/5
HobbyConsolas	85/100
PC Gamer (US)	89/100
PCGamesN	9/10
Push Square	8/10
The Games Machine (Italy)	8/10

Destiny 2: The Witch Queen received "generally favorable" reviews, according to review aggregator Metacritic.

GameSpot praised the campaign for incorporating elements from raids and dungeons, writing that, "Levels drip-feed you new mechanics and ideas all along the way so that it all comes together in the boss fight, and coupled with Destiny 2's already excellent combat foundation, it makes for an intensely fast-paced, hectic experience". Game Informer liked the new location, the Throne World, "On one side is the towering edifice of Savathûn’s sprawling palace grounds... That aesthetic gives way to a miasmic otherworldly swamp that feels dirty and overgrown. At both ends, there are secrets to uncover and impressive sights to see". GamesRadar+ enjoyed the balancing of the campaign, "the Witch Queen campaign, particularly its Legendary mode, is a superb balance of challenge and power fantasy. Legendary feels just right. It's excellent in co-op... missions spit out twice the loot on Legendary, which makes the Power leveling process even easier".

PCGamesN felt the new raid was the best in series history, "There are important roles for every player in each encounter, a good mix of different forms of challenge, and two excellent bosses which demand more from players than simply sitting in a Well of Radiance every damage phase". While liking the new activities, GameSpot criticized the new weapon crafting system as being overly convoluted, "The system generally feels a bit too grindy in its earliest iteration--a lot of unlocking weapons and their various upgrades still requires a huge reliance on random drops". IGN praised the Hive Guardians as adding a unique challenge to Destiny 2, "Victory against these formidable foes requires smart gunplay, patience, and most importantly, that you remember to quickly run and crush the enemy Ghost before it can revive them. A challenging new enemy type that forces you to think about how you approach an encounter like this is exactly what Destiny has needed to spruce up combat".
