= Uldren Sov =

Destiny supporting character

Uldren Sov The Crow
- Destiny character
- In-game screenshot of Uldren Sov as the Crow, with his Ghost companion Glint.
- First appearance: Destiny (2014)
- Created by: Bungie
- Voiced by: Brandon O'Neill

In-universe information
- Alias: Uldwyn
- Species: Awoken

Uldren Sov is a character from Bungie's Destiny video game series. He first appears as a supporting non-player character in the 2014 video game Destiny. In series lore, he served as a loyal aide to his sister Queen Mara Sov and is a prince of the Awoken, originally humans whose biology were altered as the result of an otherworldly spacetime anomaly which occurred hundreds of years before the events of the Destiny series. Uldren was the main antagonist of Forsaken, the 2017 expansion pack to Destiny 2. He is later resurrected in a subsequent story update and reintroduced in post-release seasonal content as the Crow, an ally to the player character.

Uldren Sov is voiced by Brandon O'Neill, who also portrayed the character through performance capture. O'Neill was chosen based on his portrayal of the character's original pitch as a character archetype patterned after Star Wars's Han Solo. The character has been described by critics as one of the most engaging aspects of the Destiny video game series' ongoing narrative, in particular its exploration of his new identity as a redemption story arc, which is a departure from his consistent depiction as an antagonistic personality throughout the Destiny series.

== Character overview ==
Uldren Sov's backstory prior to the events of Destiny is predominantly presented through in-game lore entries. His name is originally Uldwyn, a crew member on board the colony ship Yang Liwei alongside his mother Osana and sister Mara. The Yang Liwei was caught in a supernatural wave of energy unleashed by conflicting supernatural or "paracausal" forces during a galaxy-wide cataclysm known as the Collapse, where humanity's golden age of space colonization was abruptly ended by an entity known as the Darkness in the aftermath. Swallowed up by a kugelblitz formed by the aforementioned paracausal forces, the colony ship was transported into a pocket universe known as the Distributary. The process permanently altered the biology of the ship's passengers and crew, with blue skin coloration and long lifespans, but left them with little to no memory of their previous lives.

At some point in their history, Uldwyn changed his name to Uldren, and Mara rose into prominence as the ruling monarch of her people. A large expedition fleet led by Uldren and Mara eventually departed the anomaly and returned to the Solar system. This follows an extended passage of time where Awoken society has developed for over thousands of years, as time flows differently in the Distributary. The majority of the Awoken fleet settle in a region known as The Reef, which consists of a flotsam of broken ships and rubble scattered through space, though some Awoken depart for the Last City and integrate themselves with human society. Besides the Awoken, Mara Sov also ruled over members of the Eliksni, an insectoid alien species more commonly known as the Fallen, as Queen of the Reef. Uldren served his sister as the Reef's spymaster, and held the title of "Master of Crows". He was very close to Jolyon Till, another Crow spy who worked for Mara.

== Development and portrayal ==
Uldren Sov's species, the otherworldly Awoken, is inspired by depictions of mythological humanoid beings such as elves, vampires, ghosts, and angels in popular culture. Bungie described the Awoken as "exotic", "beautiful", and "mysterious". Uldren originally had a much larger role in the original story draft for 2014's Destiny, and was written with different personality traits compared to the final version of the character. He was meant to be a constant guide for the player throughout Destiny's campaign and is an expert for traveling around the universe, but harbors a deep distrust of the Guardian faction or the Last City they are sworn to protect. An E3 2013 trailer for Destiny identified him as "The Crow", and depicts him pulling a gun on the player character in the Cosmodrome area. That version of the character was abandoned after the game's story underwent some major changes late in development: his character model was recycled for the Awoken Prince Uldren Sov, who is consistently presented as a minor character until 2017's Destiny 2: Forsaken, while his "rogueish and charming" personality was given to the popular Guardian character Cayde-6.

"I found that a lot of times they wanted gestures to be a little bit more pronounced just so it's a little bit more exciting on the screen because the mo-cap captures something and then they digitise it and then they try to make these animated characters look natural. So, I think a larger range of motions sometimes helps them find what they're looking for because humans aren't always waving their arms around and punctuating sentences with little arm motions - we don't tend to do that."

— Brandon O'Neill, RadioTimes.com

Uldren Sov is portrayed by Brandon O'Neill, who was referred to the role through his agent. O'Neill had a little to no information about the part he had auditioned for: he did not know the name of the character, or that the audition was for a video game, or even the identity of the developer studio. During the initial audition, he was instructed to jump on a stool, wave a gun prop he is provided with, and read his lines while the developers attempted to capture his performance from different camera angles. O'Neill returned for two further auditions, where he is instructed to work with other actors and portray his character as if it is a role that involves performance capture. The identity of the project is revealed to him after he is confirmed as the character's actor, and after he had signed relevant legal documentation pertaining to his employment.

O'Neill recalled that the character's original personality was pitched as a "Han Solo, space thief kind of guy" who keeps to the himself and shuns mainstream society. In terms of appearance, he feels that Uldren has some physical similarities to him, like eyebrows and cheekbone structure, which made it easy for him to translate his own physicality into a video game character. O'Neill commenced work on the character sometime in 2011, and recorded the majority of his lines at a studio in Seattle. A substantial amount of O'Neill's work for the character was abandoned or cut prior to the release of Destiny. In an interview with RadioTimes.com, O'Neill said he was both surprised and excited about Uldren's transition from a side character to a major villain in Forsaken, and was further perplexed by Bungie's decision to resurrect the character and present him with a different personality, which he felt is indicative of the development team's desire to tell a more complex narrative about the series' themes of light and darkness.

== Appearances ==
=== Destiny ===
Uldren Sov first appears during the Black Garden story arc in the main campaign of Destiny, when players meet with Mara Sov at the Reef to seek her help. He is presented with an irritable and cynical personality, and behaves in a spiteful manner towards the player character due to his disdain for the Guardian faction. After failing to convince his sister to withhold aid, he demands proof of the Guardians' accomplishments and sends them on a hunt to slay a powerful enemy. He later reluctantly assists the player character with finding the Black Garden and help them destroy the Black Heart. The Guardians would again deal with Mara and Uldren for Destiny: The House of Wolves, the second expansion of Destiny, as they hunt on their behalf members of the eponymous Fallen House who have betrayed the Queen of the Reef.

In the opening cinematic of the third expansion, 2015's Destiny: The Taken King, Mara and Uldren lead the Awoken in the initial battle with Oryx, the Taken King. The Awoken forces manage to disable Oryx's ship, the Dreadnaught, but a blast from the vessel seemingly killed Mara and caused Uldren's ship to crash on Mars. Following this, Uldren relentlessly searches for Mara, whom he believed to have also survived the battle, while working to rally and unite Fallen factions under his influence. Uldren makes no further appearances until Destiny 2: Forsaken, and his activities were generally recorded in lore entries.

=== Destiny 2 ===
Prior to the events of Forsaken, Uldren met an injured Fallen named Fikrul while searching for Mara, and subconsciously made a "wish" about wanting to save Fikrul. His "wish" was answered by Riven, a surviving member of the genielike Ahamkara wish dragons, which transforms Fikrul from a normal Fallen into the first member of the zombielike Scorn. Neither of them recognized Riven's involvement: Fikrul changed his name to The Fanatic and begin following Uldren as his loyal subordinate, and recruited more Scorn with Uldren to form the Scorned Barons, which effectively destabilize the Fallen leadership. The Ahamkara Riven began to influence Uldren's mind, and he started to see and hear visions from Mara. Believing her to be trapped in the mythical Dreaming City of the Awoken, Uldren directed the Scorn to attack the Awoken. Uldren and the Scorned Barons are stopped by Cayde-6 and Petra Venj, a trusted aide of Queen Mara, and incarcerated in the Prison of Elders until the events of Forsaken. Uldren successfully convinced Variks, the prison's Fallen Warden, to release him. He started a prison riot and used it as a cover to break the Scorned Barons out.

When Cayde-6 arrives at the prison to stop them during the prologue segment of Forsaken, Uldren work together with the Barons to destroy Cayde-6's Ghost, eliminating his ability to be revived. Uldren then picked up Cayde's signature Ace of Spades hand cannon and executes him. In Forsaken, the Guardians battle the Scorned Barons, while Uldren sought to open the Dreaming City as part of his obsession with finding Mara. The Guardians then caught up with Uldren just in time to witness him open the Dreaming City, unknowingly freeing Riven who had manipulated Uldren into believing Mara was speaking to him. A giant monster controlled by Riven emerged from the Dreaming City and swallowed Uldren whole, but the Guardians freed him after defeating the beast. Uldren is then executed for his crimes, although it is unclear who delivered the killing blow. In mid-December 2018, Bungie added a hidden cutscene via a story update which revealed a new twist to the character's fate. After searching for years for a suitable Guardian, the Ghost nicknamed Pulled Pork made his way to the Dreaming City and encountered a body wrapped in a shroud. Pulled Pork revived him from death and transformed him into a Guardian, but with no memory of his identities as Uldwyn or Uldren.

Subsequent lore entries explain that he is shunned or disdained by other Guardians he encounters, in spite of being a Guardian himself, due to his notoriety as the man who killed Cayde-6. He encounters The Spider, a Fallen leader in the Tangled Shore region, who arranged for the concealment of his identity and gave him new clothing which shrouds his face in public. The Spider mocked him and called him The Crow, and indentured him into servitude to pay off his "debt of salvation" by boobytrapping Crow's Ghost, now renamed as Glint, in order to enslave him.

The character is formally reintroduced in Destiny 2 with Season Of The Hunt, which commenced in November 2020. In Season of the Hunt, the Crow saves a renowned Warlock named Osiris, who lost his Ghost and as a result his ability to wield the Light and to be revived from death, from a new Hive threat at the Spider's direction. The majority of Destiny 2's seasonal post-release content in 2021 was focused on the Crow's expanding story arc after the Guardians liberated the Crow from the Spider, which followed his struggles with hiding his identity and his lack of insight as to why the person he was in his past life was hated. He bonds with the player character through their interactions, without knowing what happened between his friend and his past self. In Season of the Chosen, Uldren helped prevent the assassination of the Guardian Vanguard Zavala by a rogue Cabal faction, and was formally accepted into the Guardians' fold. In Season of the Lost, the Crow and the Guardians went searching for a rogue Osiris at the Dreaming City, and meet with Mara Sov, who is revealed to be alive all along. The Witch Queen Savathûn, one of the founders of the Hive race, reveals herself and explained that she had been impersonating as Osiris since the events of Season of the Hunt. She traps herself in a massive crystal, and offers a bargain with Mara Sov and the Guardians for her personal benefit in exchange for the safe return of the real Osiris. Savathûn then used her powers to return all of Crow's memories to him, which caused him to depart from the Last City in a state of shock.

Post-release seasonal content for Destiny 2: The Witch Queen, revealed that the Crow still struggles with the effects of her psychic invasion and the memories of his past misdeeds. In Season of the Risen, the Crow continues to work with the Guardians against Savathûn's Hive faction, the Lucent Brood. In Season of the Haunted, the Crow is haunted by literal manifestations of his dark past as Uldren Sov. He is aided in his struggle by Eris Morn, who was herself haunted by visions of her dead comrades in the 2019 expansion Destiny 2: Shadowkeep.

== Promotion and reception ==
A collectible statue created by Level52 Studios, which depicts Uldren Sov as he appears prior to his death and resurrection, was offered for sale on Bungie's online store in 2018.

Uldren Sov was at one point a widely disliked character among Destiny players, particularly after his murder of Cayde-6 in Forsaken. The character's in-universe death, subsequent resurrection and lack of screen time for over 2 years of Destiny 2 post-release content gradually generated player interest in his activities and whereabouts. Popular fan theories about Uldren, which relied on lore entries that hinted at his post-resurrection activities, were widely circulated among player communities prior to the release of Destiny 2: Beyond Light and attracted attention from video game journalists. Examples include his potential replacement of Cayde-6 as the Hunter faction's Vanguard leader in the Last City's Tower, or that he has assumed a new identity as Shaw Han, the Cosmodrome vendor and the player guide for New Light, a free-to-play entry point for Destiny 2 which replaced the Red War storyline as Destiny 2's baseline campaign as of October 2020.

The character's redemption arc and transition from a villain to a tragic hero, which commenced from his appearance in Season of the Hunted, has been lauded by critics and highlighted as a notable example of the improved storytelling offered by the post-release content of Destiny 2. Phil Hornshaw from GameSpot praised Bungie's approach to have the Crow's character development unfold within the gameplay segments and cutscenes of Destiny 2 itself, as opposed to being confined to background lore which was a common practice in the past. In an article published by Game Informer in March 2021, Liana Ruppert said Uldren's villainous actions in Forsaken was the turning point for the series' narrative, and that the thematic conceit of a split between two different personalities as part of the same body was "powerful and expertly done". Ruppert said that the developers' storytelling efforts managed to change her mind about the character, as she grew fond of his new identity as the Crow and sympathized with his determination to perform good deeds, which is contrasted by the deep loathing she had of his previous incarnation as Prince of the Awoken. Joe Julians from Radio Times thought Uldren had an interesting story arc in the Destiny universe, as he went from a despised character to become one of the most beloved characters in the franchise. Paul Tassi from Forbes called Zavala's acceptance of the Crow in acknowledgment of his valiant actions during a cutscene from Season of the Chosen to be a "brilliant mirrored moment" of the introductory cutscene in Forsaken where his past self coldly executes Cayde-6.

Some critics have taken note of the Crow's arc in Season of the Haunted, where he is confronted by literal manifestations of his villainous past. Gabriele Cuscino from IGN Italia considered it to be a natural continuation of his redemption arc from a broken character that was shaped by the years he spent living in the shadow of Mara Sov, his unhealthy emotional dependency on their relationship, and by the emptiness left by his perceived loss of his sister. Hornshaw cited the exploration of the Crow's mental health issues and how he is assisted by the player character and non-player characters like Eris Morn in confronting his villainous past to be an "admirable job" by Bungie in dealing with conversations about mental and emotional health.
