= Cayde-6 =

Destiny supporting character

- Destiny character
- Promotional art of Cayde-6
- First appearance: Destiny (2014)
- Created by: Bungie
- Voiced by: Nathan Fillion; Nolan North (Forsaken)

In-universe information
- Species: Exo
- Weapon: Ace of Spades hand cannon

Cayde-6 is a character from Bungie's Destiny video game series. He first appears in the 2014 video game Destiny as a supporting non-player character with a leadership role within the player-aligned Guardians, protectors of Earth's last safe city against various alien threats. Cayde-6 is an Exo, a highly advanced robot made by the fictional company 'Braytech', with the mind of a living human being uploaded into its consciousness. Like other Guardians, Cayde-6 is accompanied by a floating robotic companion called a Ghost and wields an otherworldly power called Light granted by the mysterious Traveler, progenitor of the Ghosts. Originally presented as a vendor and occasional questgiver, Cayde-6 is given a prominent role in the series' narrative beginning with the 2015 expansion Destiny: The Taken King. Cayde-6 continued to appear as a major character within series lore, until he is killed off in the 2018 expansion for Destiny 2, Forsaken. Cayde-6 was voiced by Nathan Fillion for the majority of his appearances, and by Nolan North for the character's final chronological appearance in Forsaken. He was brought back along with Fillion in The Final Shape, the last DLC in the Light & Darkness saga for Destiny 2.

Cayde-6 emerged as a popular character with Destiny's player base following the launch of The Taken King. However, Bungie staff indicated during interviews to promote Forsaken that they had long considered killing off Cayde and retiring him from the narrative of Destiny, having identified the shock value potential in killing off a fan favorite character in order to generate more interest in the series' narrative from players. Cayde-6's overall characterization and the events surrounding his death, as well as Bungie's handling of the story content of Destiny 2 which include several pivotal scenes that focus on the character, drew a wide array of reactions from both critics and players.

== Character overview ==
Although Cayde-6 is not biologically human, he and other Exo individuals are treated no differently than biological human beings because they possess the mind and personality of a person who once existed. The original individual Cayde-6 is based on a person who agreed to be turned into an Exo as a result of his debts, and who in life wrote several apologetic journal entries addressed to his son. The number after an Exo's name designates the number of times they have had their system rebooted; each reboot takes an Exo's memory, and each reboot makes it harder for an Exo to recall their short-term experiences. His name indicates that prior to the events of the Destiny video game series, Cayde-6 has been rebooted six times, which includes the moment he was awoken by his Ghost Sundance as a Guardian, the protectors of Earth's last safe city for humanity. After the Collapse, a cataclysmic event that ended the golden age of human civilization, the Exo is revived by a Ghost, a small robotic companion derived from an inscrutable celestial being known as the Traveler, and becomes a Guardian. Cayde-6 is left with little memory of his past life in the process, except for his journal and playing cards which are used markers for his different remembrances. In spite of his inorganic nature, Cayde-6 appears to be capable of consuming human food, such as ramen. Aside from his Ghost Sundance, Cayde-6 keeps a pet chicken named Colonel as a companion.

Cayde-6 is originally introduced as the leader of the Hunters, one of three factions within the Guardians, warriors who serve to protect Earth's last safe city for humanity. Within series lore, a hunter's role is to act as a scout for the Last City, taking bounties and performing reconnaissance on behalf of their allies. After his closest friend was killed, Cayde-6 became a Vanguard, an elite-level leader of the Hunter faction. Alongside other members of the Vanguard, he is responsible for coordinating the defenses of the Last City and is confined to the Tower instead of being able to go out and explore. Like other friendly non-player characters in Destiny 2, Cayde-6 acted as a vendor for in-game items and occasionally provides quests for the player to complete: one noteworthy assignment involves the character's favorite food, ramen.

== Development ==
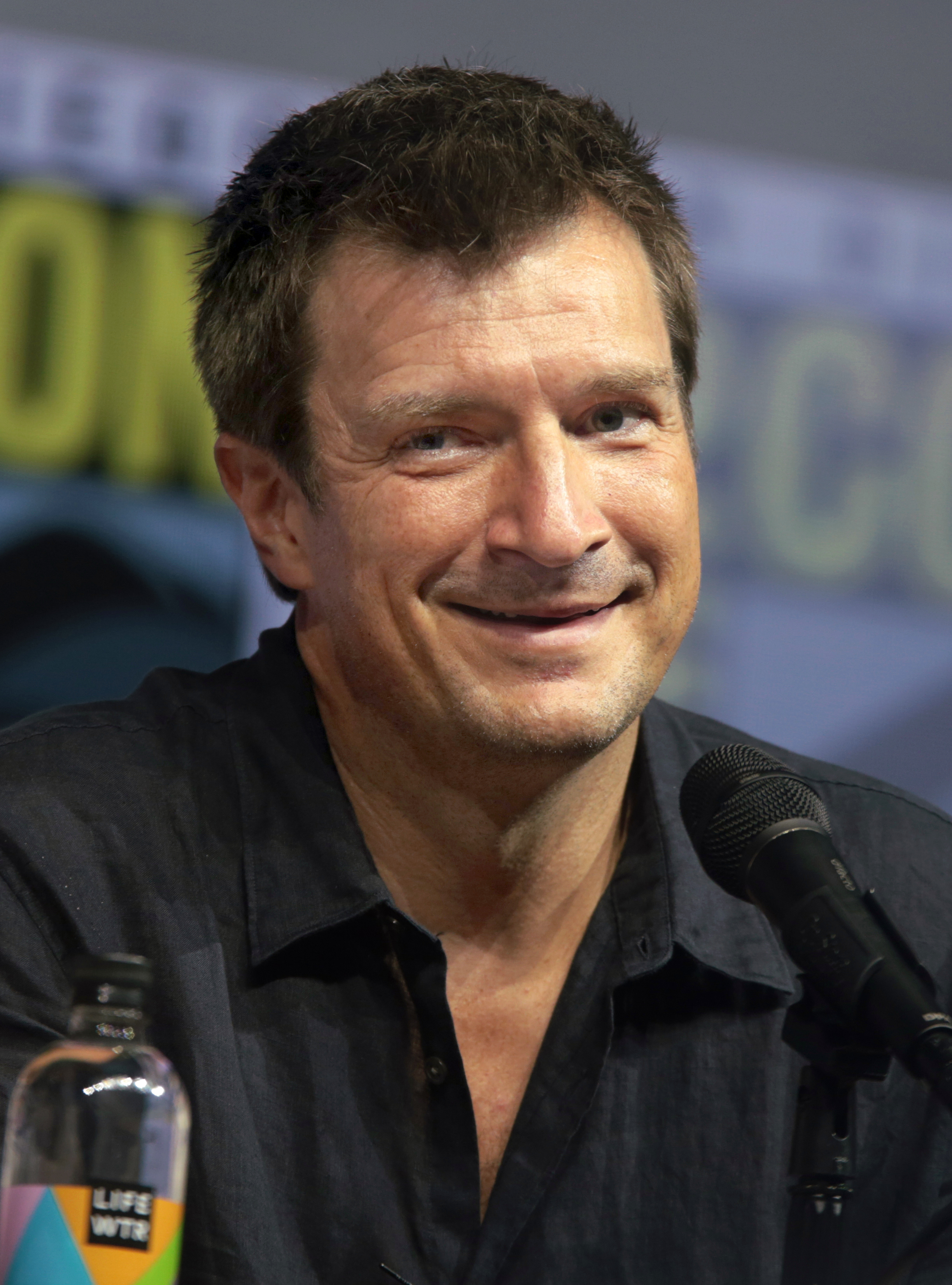
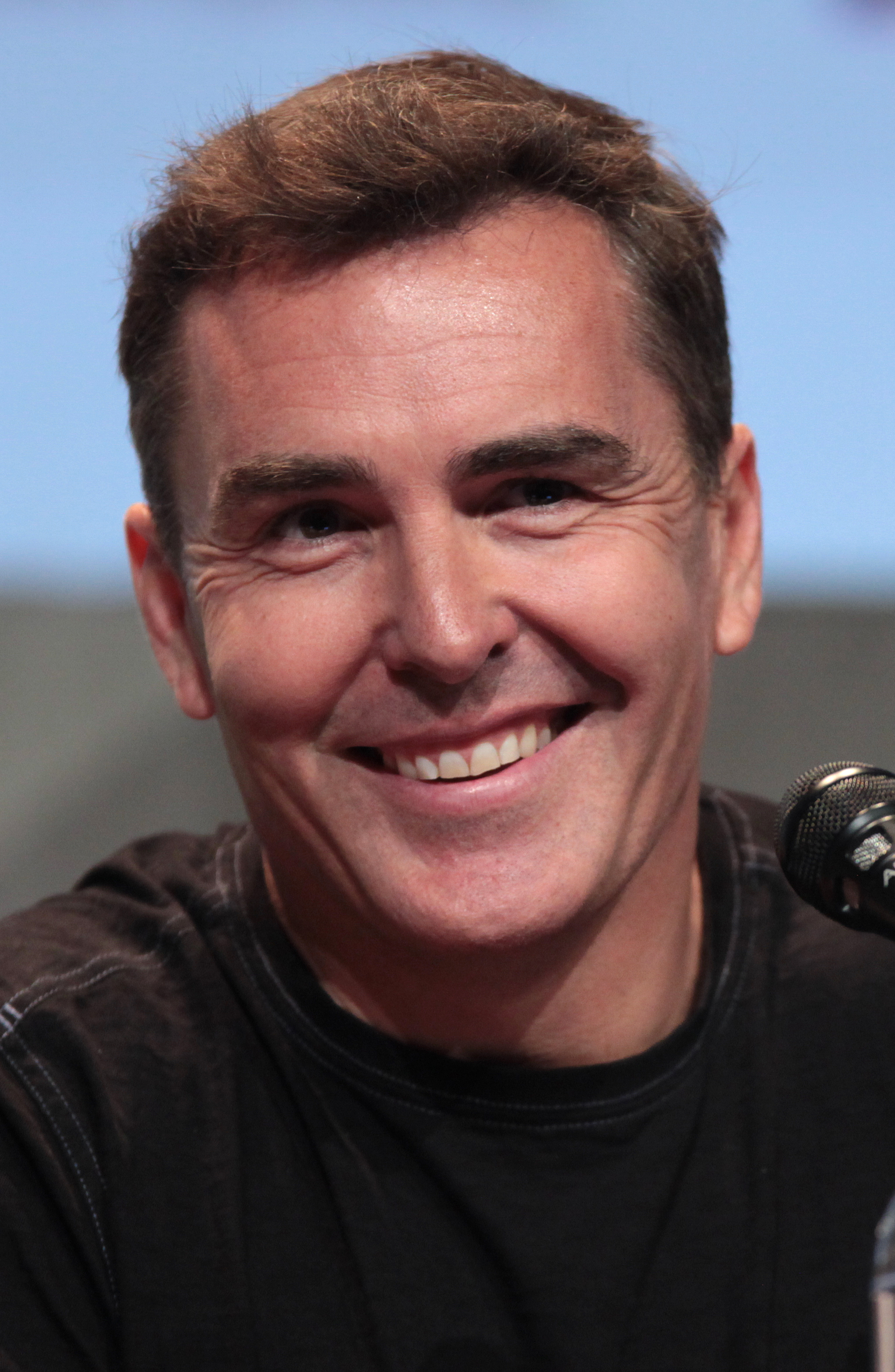
Nathan Fillion (left) and Nolan North (right)

As autonomous sentient robots, Exo characters were envisioned by Bungie to be "sinister", "powerful", and "tireless" war machines. Popular culture depictions of the undead, the Terminator franchise's titular cyborg enforcers, and Halo's Master Chief were among the sources of inspiration for the visual language of Exo characters. In the original story draft for 2014's Destiny early in its development, a character known the Crow possessed similar "rogueish and charming" personality traits as Cayde-6's characterization as seen in the 2015 expansion The Taken King. Cayde-6 is voiced by Nathan Fillion for the majority of the character's appearances. Like many other members of the cast, Bungie gifted Fillion a commemorative prop themed after the character he portrayed, which recreates the appearance of Cayde-6's signature weapon, the Ace of Spades hand cannon. Fillion did not reprise his role as Cayde-6 for Forsaken and was replaced by Nolan North for the expansion.

As Bungie wanted to establish a severe tone for the Destiny series, the writing team decided to tell an overarching story with high stakes for Forsaken and surprise players with the darker tone of its story beats. During an interview, Project lead Scott Taylor noted that Cayde-6 was ultimately chosen to be permanently retired because the character occupies a "really unique place" in the Destiny universe. Citing the need to be less conservative with taking creative risks in spite of the character's popularity, he explained that the choice to kill off Cayde-6 specifically was not arbitrary in nature but rather to motivate players to feel a personal connection to the quest for revenge that drives the narrative of Forsaken. Taylor described the immediate aftermath of Forsaken's launch as a "surreal" emotional experience for him and the rest of his team as they had mourned the character's imminent demise while developing the project. The developers' public stance on the character's fate contradict Fillion's comments from a 2018 interview, where he suggested that Cayde-6's death may not be final, and would continue to maintain that they had no plans to bring the character back into series canon in subsequent interviews and announcements.

== Appearances ==
=== Destiny ===
Cayde-6 is introduced as a member of a triumvirate of leaders, alongside Commander Zavala and Ikora Rey, who head the three Guardian factions that protect the Last City. The character's role in the series narrative expanded by the events of The Taken King, where the Vanguard's leadership are struck by analysis paralysis while attempting to address the threat posed by a dreadnaught ship commanded by Oryx, the Taken King. After the Vanguard advisor Eris Morn explains the nature of the threat Oryx's ship poses, Cayde-6 is determined to end the threat posed by his Taken minions. He sends the player character to the dreadnaught using modified stealth technology and Morn's special ship, where the main weapon is destroyed to make way for the establishment of a beachhead. While Oryx is successfully assassinated as part of the Guardian operation, the other members of the Vanguard are displeased with Cayde-6's actions.

=== Destiny 2 ===
Cayde-6 is among the Guardians who survive the Cabal assault on the Last City led by Dominus Ghaul. Unlike his peers, Cayde-6 is determined to take the city back as soon as possible. He attempts to devise a plan to undermine the occupying forces but is caught and trapped by the Vex. After being rescued by other Guardians, he relocates to the artificial intelligence (AI) Failsafe's crashed ship on Nessus. He continues to play an active role within the war effort and often leads strike teams against the Guardians' enemies, although he is frequently depicted as a comic relief character who lacks competence.

Cayde-6 is killed off during the introductory story segment of Forsaken and could not be revived as his Ghost companion Sundance had been destroyed by his enemies. The story campaign of Forsaken is primarily driven by the desire to pursue Cayde-6's killers and avenge the character.

Cayde-6 is shown again and seems to be alive in the trailer for The Final Shape expansion, shown in the 2023 PlayStation Showcase. His revival was caused by Crow's wish to the Ahamkara Riven of a Thousand Voices during Season of the Wish in the previous expansion Lightfall, and he works with the Vanguard during their campaign against the Witness. After a Guardian fireteam defeats the Witness before it completes the Final Shape in the Salvation's Edge raid, he participates in one last assault into the Pale Heart against the Witness in the Excision activity. The player's Ghost sacrifices himself to destroy it, but Cayde makes the decision to resurrect him at the cost of his own life. In the aftermath, Crow succeeds him as the Hunter Vanguard leader.

=== Other appearances ===
Cayde-6 is the central character of a 2019 comic titled Cayde's Six.

== Promotion and merchandise ==
The limited edition of The Taken King includes a copy of Treasure Island, a document with notes written by Cayde-6 that give insight into his past. TUBBZ released a line of cosplaying ducks themed after Destiny characters, which include the likes of Cayde-6 and Eris Morn.

Cayde-6 is featured prominently in several promotional trailers for Destiny 2. The character is also featured in official social media posts which promoted the launch of Destiny 2.

Following the character's death, Bungie created an in-game tribute to the character in the form of a coupon that players could pick up from the ramen booth in the Tower through a side-quest, which featured a written record of the character reminiscing about his love of ramen, the Last City and its residents. Another easter egg left by Bungie to commemorate Cayde-6 involved his cloak being draped over a wall that is adjacent to another non-player character in the Tower.

For 2021's Bungie Day, an annual event held on July 7 which celebrates the relationship between Bungie and its fan community, a free emblem called A Classy Order which references Cayde-6's Spicy Ramen Coupon was released for Destiny 2 players.

In April 2021, Bungie released a video trailer featuring Cayde-6 to promote the Guardian Games event. Fillion reprised the character for the video.

== Reception ==
=== General ===
"Destiny puts us in a hopeless future with humanity's backs against the wall, and it tells us that we can make the world a better place. Cayde's story is Destiny's story. He embodies everything that Destiny is about, while his compatriots sit there acting out the part of glorified vendors with boring, RPG class-cliched motivations. Cayde is the best Destiny has to offer."

— "Destiny 2: Forsaken Did Cayde-6 Dirty"

Cayde-6 is popular among video game enthusiasts, especially fans of the Destiny franchise, and is a popular subject for creative activities engaged in by Destiny fans, such as fan art. The character has received an overall positive reception from critics. GamesRadar ranked included Cayde-6 in their list of the most iconic video game characters of all time, ranking him at 40th place; Rachel Weber said Cayde-6 had "one of the most satisfying character arcs", and ascribed his fan favorite status to Nathan Fillion's performance, noting that he is a good example of how the "right voice actor can completely make or break a character". Jaz from US Gamer nominated Cayde-6 as the best video game character of 2015, praising Fillion's performance and the way he conveyed his character's personality without overplaying his dialogue. Kotaku staff also praised Fillion's performances for its consistent quality. Kirk Hamilton described Fillion's portrayal as an "amped-up robot version" of his character from the Firefly series, Malcolm Reynolds. Nathan Grayson, also writing for Kotaku, said he did not initially appreciate Fillion's quip-driven performances, but conceded that his character " brought an undeniable charisma" to the Red War campaign of Destiny 2 which he found lacking in subsequent campaigns like Beyond Light.

Tom Power from Games Revolution observed that while Cayde-6 had remained largely popular throughout his appearances as a source of comic relief, he reported that some players found some of his jokes in Destiny 2 "felt forced". For Doc Burford from US Gamer, Cayde-6's story arc is a complex though fundamentally important aspect of the Destiny series. He liked the incorporation of his backstory into the lore of "Treasure Island", calling it "some of the coolest lore Destiny's ever had", and that it gave an impression of Cayde-6 as an articulate character with a nuanced, multi-faceted personality. On the other hand, Burford was highly critical of what he perceived to be Cayde-6's flanderization from Destiny 2 onwards, and that his comic relief traits have been greatly exaggerated to a point where he is "a jester meant to take pratfalls for our amusement". Burford compared this iteration of Cayde-6 to Scrappy-Doo, a divisive character from the Scooby-Doo media franchise known for his obnoxious personality.

=== Death ===
Bungie's decision to permanently kill off Cayde-6 in Forsaken, announced ahead of the expansion pack's release date, received significant attention. The character's demise during the events of Forsaken elicited a passionate response from players, with many posting to internet message boards and Reddit threads about the character shortly after the release of Forsaken. In June 2018, a group of fans set up a makeshift memorial shrine for Cayde-6 outside of the Los Angeles Convention Center to commemorate the character's demise. In response to Bungie's announcement that a number of in-game content such as coupons will be phased out with the launch of the Beyond Light expansion, fans began sharing homemade designs for spicy ramen shaders, emblems, and 3d printable seals across social media; Ethan Gach from Kotaku suggested that these efforts attempts to persuade Bungie to carry on the item's legacy in some way after it is permanently removed from the game. In anticipation of community interest in the free emblem meant for Bungie Day 2021, dataminers leaked the imminent release of A Classy Order prior to its release. Bungie's senior community manager took to social media in response, and asked fans to refrain from spoiling content as well as purchasing what is meant to be a free gift from resellers and dataminers.

The handling of Cayde-6's death in Forsaken has been discussed at length by several critics. GamesRadar staff described the character's permanent departure from the Tower hub area and subsequent death as a turning point for the narrative of Destiny 2 with its return to the first game's darker tone. Collin MacGregor from PCGamesN welcomed the decision as one of the best Bungie has made for the series; he observed that the character's demise managed to unite the Destiny community and succeeded in generating interest in the narrative of Destiny 2 due to its intimacy. Burford took a more negative stance and claimed the character has "died before Destiny 2 even shipped", and that his death was "sad because he was pathetic" instead of being genuinely tragic. He felt that there was no gravitas or purpose with the character's death as his likeability had been severely undermined by Bungie in his previous appearances, and that the extensive advertising which promoted the imminent demise of Cayde-6 had further reduced the dramatic impact.

Bungie's decision to permanently remove, or "vault", earlier released content for Destiny 2 has generated discussions on how it affects Cayde-6's appearances in Destiny media. Writing for Forbes, Paul Tassi questioned whether Bungie's decision was a good one as it effectively erases the pivotal moments of the character's appearances to the detriment of new players and their experiences. Conversely, Tyler Chancey from TechRaptor called it a bittersweet decision and felt that Bungie's decision to vault content due to technical constraints was justified. He argued that sentimentality must be met with the understanding that that part of Destiny's story has been told and that his murderer Uldren Sov is already undergoing a redemption arc.
