= Destiny 2: Forsaken =

2018 expansion of Destiny 2

- Cover art featuring a Guardian carrying the corpse of Cayde-6
- Developer: Bungie
- Publishers: Activision (2018–2019); Bungie (2019–present)
- Director: Scott Taylor
- Producer: Christopher Barrett
- Composers: Michael Salvatori; Skye Lewin; Rotem Moav; Pieter Schlosser
- Series: Destiny
- Platforms: PlayStation 4; Windows; Xbox One; Stadia; PlayStation 5; Xbox Series X/S
- Release: September 4, 2018
- Genres: Action role-playing, first-person shooter
- Mode: Multiplayer

Destiny 2: Forsaken was a major expansion for Destiny 2, a first-person shooter video game by Bungie. Representing the third expansion and the second year of extended content for Destiny 2, it was released on September 4, 2018. Forsaken revolved around the player's Guardian seeking to avenge the death of Cayde-6 by the hands of the Awoken Prince Uldren Sov. Uldren, corrupted by the Darkness, was in search of his lost sister, Queen Mara Sov, both of whom were thought to have died in Destiny: The Taken King (2015). Along their journey, players faced the Scorn, undead versions of the Fallen race that had been revived and morphed into a new race.

The expansion's release coincided with patch version 2.0 for Destiny 2, which made fundamental changes to the core functionality for all players to mark the start of Year 2 of the game's lifecycle. Through the development of Forsaken, Bungie sought to address criticisms from players and critics; many changes to the game were direct responses to this. Forsaken added content across the game, including new missions, Player versus Environment (PvE) locations, Player versus Player (PvP) maps, player gear, weaponry, a brand new PvE/PvP hybrid game mode called Gambit, and a new raid. The expansion also introduced the game's first dungeon, a new challenging three-player activity. A seasonal model was also introduced, in which smaller content packages were released periodically throughout the year between the releases of the major expansions. The seasonal model continued until The Final Shape (2024), which replaced the seasons with larger episodes.

Upon the expansion's release, retailers also issued Destiny 2: Forsaken Legendary Collection, which included the Destiny 2 base game, Forsaken, and the previous two expansions, Curse of Osiris and Warmind. An Annual Pass was also released alongside the expansion, which granted access to the seasonal content for Year 2 of the game. The year began with Season of the Outlaw, which was an alternative name for Forsaken and the year's initial time period until the release of the subsequent season. The content of the Annual Pass included Season of the Forge in December 2018, Season of the Drifter in March 2019, and Season of Opulence in June 2019—this seasonal content, however, was removed from the game with the release of Beyond Light in November 2020, with the exception of Gambit Prime from Season of the Drifter, which replaced the standard three-round version of Gambit that was originally added with Forsaken.

The seasons bridged the events of Forsaken to the next expansion, Shadowkeep. Following Season of the Outlaw, Season of the Forge introduced Ada-1 and the ancient Black Armory, a secret Golden Age weapon foundry, with the Guardian helping Ada-1 reclaim lost Forges from a rogue Fallen terrorist faction, the Kell's Scourge, preventing them from weaponizing this powerful lost technology. Season of the Drifter centered on the roguish Lightbearer, the Drifter, and his controversial, Darkness-fueled game of Gambit, with the Guardian learning of his mysterious past and his shadowy dealings with the Nine. Season of Opulence saw the Exiled Cabal Emperor Calus invite the Guardian to his ship, the Leviathan, to partake in a challenge known as the Menagerie, where in exchange for loyalty and performing grand feats, Calus promised limitless treasures and crowned the Guardian as his newest Shadow.

Upon the release of The Witch Queen expansion in February 2022, Forsaken's campaign and the Tangled Shore destination were removed from the game as part of a developer initiative called the "Destiny Content Vault". Ahead of its removal, Forsaken's campaign was made free-to-play in December 2021. Simultaneously, a special Forsaken Pack was released, which grants access to Forsaken's endgame content and exotic gear that was not removed.

== Gameplay ==
In comparison to the previous two expansions of Destiny 2, Forsaken features a "full campaign", four new multiplayer "strike" missions (one of which was a PS4 timed-exclusive), four new Crucible maps (including one PS4 timed-exclusive), and a new mode called "Gambit" which combines elements of Player versus Environment (PvE) with Player versus Player (PvP). A new competitive Crucible mode was added, called "Breakthrough"—two teams of four fight to attempt to capture a central point called a "Breaker"; the first team that captures the Breaker can then hack the opposing team's vault, all while the opposing team defends their vault from being hacked.

The expansion introduces a new faction of enemies, the Scorn—undead Fallen corrupted by Dark Ether that have become their own race. Scorn enemies do not take cover and have the most aggressive artificial intelligence in the game. In addition, a more liberal sense to mission layout and player choice has been taken, with the initial six Barons being able to be taken out in any order the player chooses. The Tangled Shore and the Dreaming City, both located in the Reef, serve as new playable environments in Forsaken; the latter environment is accessible after completing the main campaign of the expansion and completing a post-campaign mission. At the Dreaming City's Blind Well, players can use special charges of Light to summon Scorn, Hive, or Taken enemies for public battles, each ending with a boss. All participants in Blind Well battles receive rewards. The charges of Light correspond to three difficulty levels; an optional, yet highly difficult, fourth level can be triggered at the end of the third tier of difficulty. A new raid mission, "Last Wish", was opened on September 14, 2018; unlike previous raids, there is no Prestige version. Bungie claimed that the raid had more bosses than any previous raid (including from the original game); the first completion of the raid triggered a three-week curse cycle in the Dreaming City, opening up new activities and missions for players to participate in, including a 3-player raid-like activity called a dungeon. "The Shattered Throne", the game's first-ever dungeon, was made available on September 28, 2018; the activity was initially only available every three weeks when the Dreaming City's curse was at full strength until the release of Shadowkeep in October 2019, which made the dungeon fully playable anytime. A new weapon type, a Combat Bow, was also added in the expansion. The EXP level cap was raised to 50 and the Power level cap was raised to 600.

Each of the three character classes feature three new supers for each of their subclasses, which are tied to a brand new third subclass branch. For Hunters, the new super for Gunslingers is "Blade Barrage", focusing on throwing a volley of flaming knives; "Spectral Blades" for Nightstalkers, allowing players to turn invisible and see through walls and attack with Void daggers; and "Whirlwind Guard" for Arcstriders, which allows players to block and reflect projectiles by spinning their Arc Staff. For Warlocks, the new super for Voidwalkers is "Nova Warp", allowing players to teleport around the battlefield and unleash a Void explosion; "Chaos Reach" for Stormcallers, which unleashes a beam of Arc energy that can be turned off at any time to conserve Super energy; and "Well of Radiance" for Dawnblades, allowing players to create a healing and empowering aura for players to stand in. Finally, for Titans, the new super for Strikers is "Thundercrash", allowing players to launch into the air and slam onto the ground; "Burning Maul" for Sunbreakers, where players wield a large flaming hammer that can unleash flaming tornadoes; and "Banner Shield" for Sentinels, allowing players to use their Sentinel Shield to unleash a protective barrier that players can also shoot their weapons through. Each new subclass branch, along with their new supers, can be unlocked by obtaining an item called a "Seed of Light", in which three are available for each character; the first Seed of Light is obtainable through playing the campaign of Forsaken, while the other two can be obtained by playing through high-level, endgame activities.

Gambit, the new PvE/PvP hybrid mode, consists of a best-of-three rounds featuring a new character called the Drifter as its non-player character (NPC). A 24-hour free trial of the mode was made available to all players on September 1, 2018, three days prior to the launch of Forsaken. In this mode, two teams of four players compete against each other by defeating PvE enemies. Enemies, when defeated, drop motes which players can pick up and deposit in a bank in the center of the arena. Depositing 5, 10, or 15 motes sends small, medium, or large enemy blockers, respectively, to the opposing team's arena and locks their bank; the opposing team must defeat the blockers in order to reactivate their bank. Every 25 motes deposited opens a portal where one team member can invade the other team's arena. Motes are permanently lost if a player is defeated by a PvE enemy or an invading member of the opposing team. After depositing 75 motes, a boss called a Primeval spawns in the middle of the arena; if a team member is defeated by an invading member of the opposing team, the Primeval regains health. The first team that defeats their Primeval wins the round. Gambit also features a progressive-based ranking system similar to the Crucible's Valor and Glory ranks called "Infamy"; however, each progression rank is separated into three tiers, with each rank requiring more Infamy points.

=== Seasonal changes ===
Forsaken introduced the Annual Pass, which was released alongside the expansion. It included three premium downloadable content packages that were released in December 2018 and March and June 2019. This was Bungie's initial seasonal content model, however, although there were three content packages, these could not be purchased separately and had to be purchased altogether in the Annual Pass. Content in these drops included new endgame challenges, new weapons, armor, and "vanity rewards" to collect, new and returning Exotics, new pinnacle activities, new triumph records to collect, and new lore to discover. Each season's content carried over and was playable at anytime in future seasons of Year 2. All of the content of the Annual Pass became free to all owners of Forsaken on September 18, 2019, just prior to the release of the next expansion, Shadowkeep, which began Year 3 and changed the way in which seasonal content is purchased and delivered—one such difference is that seasonal content can now be purchased separately via seasonal passes. All content of the Annual Pass was accessible throughout Year 3, however, it became unavailable in Year 4 as this content was entered into the Destiny Content Vault with the release of Beyond Light in November 2020, with the exception of Gambit Prime, which replaced the standard three-round Gambit and was renamed as Gambit.

As Forsaken introduced the seasonal model for Destiny 2, there were no seasonal names for the content drops of Year 1, but the releases have been numerically categorized. The base game's original Red War campaign is Season 1, the Curse of Osiris expansion is Season 2, and the Warmind expansion is Season 3. Forsaken, which is also known as Season of the Outlaw, is Season 4, but it was not until Season 5, Season of the Forge, which was the first content drop of the Annual Pass, in which the seasonal model for Destiny 2 truly began.

Season of the Forge (Season 5), also known as Black Armory, was released on December 4, 2018. The season revolved around the exploits of Ada-1, a female Exo who had been left in charge of a late Golden Age weapon foundry known as the Black Armory. The story was much more loose and lore-driven than that of Forsaken, with the player piecing together the story of the weapon foundry via weapon lore tabs and minor quests given by Ada-1. The main new activity was the "Lost Forge", where players forged weapons in Black Armory forges on the EDZ and Nessus while protecting the forges from waves of enemies. Players obtained weapon frames from Ada-1 and then completed certain objectives for each frame prior to participating in a Lost Forge activity. A new raid, "Scourge of the Past", was also released, and took place in the Last City. In addition, the Power level cap was increased to 650 and four new exotic weapons were introduced.

Season of the Drifter (Season 6), also known as Joker's Wild, was released on March 5, 2019, and focused on the Drifter and his connection with the Nine. It introduced a brand new Gambit mode called Gambit Prime (a more intensive, single round-based version of Gambit, with some changes), as well as a new activity tied to it called "The Reckoning", a three-tier PvE horde mode that took place inside the Drifter's mysterious ship and the realm of the Nine. The Reckoning's three tiers were released over the course of the season and awarded Gambit Prime role-specific gear with perks that could only be utilized in Gambit Prime. The four Gambit Prime roles that were tied into the gear were "Invader" (focusing on invading the opposing team's arena and stealing motes from their bank, color-coded red), "Sentry" (focusing on defeating blockers and invaders and defending their bank, color-coded yellow), "Collector" (specializing in collecting and banking motes, color-coded white), and "Reaper" (specializing in defeating enemies, color-coded green). Collecting a full set of gear tied to a particular role unlocked exclusive perks for that role (with the sunsetting of gear that occurred alongside Beyond Light's release in November 2020, these perks were made into armor mods). As well, the Power level cap was increased to 700; players who were below the recommended Power level for the season's activities could obtain power surge bounties from the Drifter to obtain gear that would quickly raise their Power level up to 640. The season also added two new Gambit maps and private Gambit matches, a nine-week quest called "Invitations of the Nine" that could be obtained from Xûr starting from March 15 that unlocked new story and lore focusing on the Nine and their Emissary (who was formerly the NPC for the Trials of the Nine PvP mode from the base game), an allegiance quest that also began on March 15 that allowed players to either side with the Vanguard or with the Drifter, as well as two exotic quests.

Season of Opulence (Season 7), also known as Penumbra, was released on June 4, 2019, and focused on Emperor Calus from the base game's "Leviathan" raid, who was the main NPC for the season via his robot emissaries Benedict 99–40 in the Tower and Werner 99–40 on Nessus. The season raised the Power level cap to 750 and introduced a new six-player match-made activity called "The Menagerie", a PvE horde mode that featured raid-like mechanics that took place in an older area of the Leviathan ship and awarded weapons and gear that players could choose to earn via runes offered to an upgradeable item called the Chalice of Opulence. There were three unique final bosses that rotated weekly. A heroic version of The Menagerie sans matchmaking was released on June 25. A new raid, "Crown of Sorrow", which also took place on the Leviathan, was made available alongside the season's release; the season's opening quest, however, had to be completed in order to access the raid. Players who were below the recommended Power level for the season's activities were awarded gear that quickly raised their Power level up to 690 upon completing the opening quest, acting similar to the power surge bounties from the previous season. Another new activity called "The Tribute Hall" was added on July 9, and was also housed in the Leviathan. Through the Tribute Hall, players could obtain golden tribute statues to adorn their respective hall by completing in-game triumphs as well as purchasing tributes directly from a statue called the Visage of Calus.

== Plot ==
=== Forsaken/Season of the Outlaw ===
One year after The Red War, Forsaken focused on Prince Uldren Sov, who, along with his sister, Queen Mara Sov, were thought to have died at the onset of the Taken War three years prior. Uldren (driven mad by a partial Taken infection) is in search of his lost sister, believing her to still be alive. Several months after the events of Warmind, the Guardian and Cayde-6 travel to the Reef, where they aid Petra Venj in securing a breakout from the Prison of Elders by an enemy called the Scorn, which are undead Fallen that have been revived and mutated by dark ether (ether corrupted by Taken blight), becoming their own separate race. However, during the assault, Petra discovers that someone else had released the prisoners and escaped (revealed in supplemental lore to be Variks, the Loyal (possibly being manipulated by the Nine), from the first game's House of Wolves expansion). Cayde goes to find them, only to be attacked by the Scorn and their leaders, the Scorned Barons; the Baron Pirrha, the Rifleman, destroys Cayde's Ghost, Sundance. Reksis Vahn, the Hangman, then severely wounds Cayde afterwards. The Guardian and Petra attempt to rescue Cayde, but Uldren murders Cayde with his own iconic hand cannon, the Ace of Spades, before fleeing with the Barons; as Cayde's Ghost was destroyed, he was unable to be revived.

The Guardian takes Cayde's body back to the Tower, where Ikora Rey holds a funeral for the fallen Hunter Vanguard. Ikora wishes to pursue vengeance against Uldren, but Commander Zavala refuses to go to war in order to protect the Traveler and the Last City. Without the support of the remaining Vanguard and only a small lead from Ikora, the Guardian sets out alone to hunt down Uldren and avenge Cayde, tracking him, his Barons, and the Scorn to the Tangled Shore, a lawless wasteland in the Reef. After a confrontation with the leader of the Barons, Fikrul, the Fanatic, The Guardian is contacted by Petra, who introduces them to the Spider, the leader of a Fallen crime syndicate, and establishes an alliance. With help from Spider and Petra, the Guardian sets out to eliminate the eight Scorned Barons, one by one. Meanwhile, Uldren, who was partially corrupted by the Darkness after the Battle of Saturn, is apparently guided by visions of Mara to free her, and takes a shard of the Traveler from the European Dead Zone.

The Guardian eliminates six of the eight Scorned Barons. They destroy Hiraks, the Mindbender, and his Hive throne world; stop Araskes, the Trickster, and her plan to sabotage engrams for the Tower; prevent Kaniks, the Mad Bomber, from blowing up the Tangled Shore; kill Yaviks, the Rider, and her Pike gang; and then terminate Reksis Vahn and Pirrha afterwards, respectively. Following the death of the sixth Baron, the Guardian is contacted by Petra, who informs them that Uldren is headed for the Awoken Watchtower in the Tangled Shore. After defeating the seventh Baron and second-in-command to the Fanatic, Elykris, the Machinist, the Guardian, aided by Spider's crime syndicate and Petra, assaults the Awoken Watchtower and eliminates the Fanatic (though through additional dialogue it is implied that he is immortal and will return). The Guardian makes their way through the Taken-infested Watchtower, as well as the Taken Ascendant Realm in search of Uldren, who offers the shard and his own Darkness to open a gateway to the Dreaming City, the Awoken homeland. Instead of Mara, however, Uldren is devoured by a grotesque Taken creature called the Voice of Riven. The Guardian slays the abomination, releasing a weakened Uldren. They retrieve the Ace of Spades, and soon after, Petra arrives, with Uldren adamantly declaring that everything he did was for his sister. The Guardian and Petra then point their weapons at Uldren and the screen cuts to black, as a gunshot is heard. The Guardian then returns to the Tower, their mission complete. Multiple characters either encourage or disapprove of the Guardian's actions, with the Drifter stating that they are "just what he needs for Gambit", and Zavala forewarning of the consequences of their revenge.

With Uldren dead and Cayde avenged, the Guardian speaks to Petra and is presented with a broken Awoken talisman. They set out to repair it with Light and Dark energies, and after doing so, they meet her at the Awoken Watchtower again. The Guardian follows her into the Dreaming City, where Petra attempts to contact Mara Sov using an Awoken device known as the Oracle Engine. The Guardian and Petra repair the device and establish contact with the Queen, who has been in a mysterious realm of her own creation following her confrontation with Oryx. She reveals that Uldren's corruption was caused by Riven of a Thousand Voices, a powerful dragon-like creature called an Ahamkara that can grant wishes similar to a genie, and the last of her kind, who was voluntarily taken by Oryx during the Taken War. The Queen then opens the Dreaming City to Guardians in hopes of ending the Taken threat by killing Riven. A fireteam of Guardians assembled by Petra make their way through the Keep of Voices in the Dreaming City ("Last Wish" raid), freeing two Awoken Techeuns, Kalli, and Shuro Chi, from their Taken corruption. They advance further and kill Morgeth, the Spirekeeper, and unlock a maximum-security Awoken vault before facing Riven herself. After killing her, the Guardians take Riven's heart out of the keep to be purified by Shuro Chi and Kalli, unwittingly unleashing a Taken curse upon the Dreaming City in the process (Riven's last wish granted, which had been made by Savathûn, the Witch Queen prior to Riven's confrontation with the Guardians).

Following the Taken corruption of the Dreaming City caused by Riven's last wish, the Guardian continues to work with Petra against Scorn, Hive, and Taken forces over the course of three weeks. On the third week of the curse, a fireteam of Guardians enter Eleusinia, the throne world of Mara Sov, in order to end the curse ("The Shattered Throne" dungeon). They fight their way through and find Dûl Incaru, the Eternal Return, a powerful Hive Wizard and daughter of Savathûn, the Witch Queen, a Hive god and sister to Oryx. The Guardians defeat Dûl Incaru and seemingly end the Taken curse. However, the curse reverts the Dreaming City to the state it was in after Riven was killed, indicating that the Dreaming City is caught in a three-week time-loop. During this time, it is also revealed that a Ghost named Glint entered the Dreaming City and discovered the body of Uldren, who was then resurrected with Glint's Light, making him a Guardian—upon resurrection, Guardians have no memories of their past life from before becoming a Guardian. (Note: Uldren's narrative continues into Destiny 2: Beyond Light in Season of the Hunt, Season of the Chosen, and Season of the Lost.)

=== Season of the Forge ===
Following the events of Forsaken, the Guardian is given a mysterious seal by the Spider, leading them to a hidden section of the Tower known as the Annex. Here the Guardian meets Ada-1, an Exo who is the curator of the Black Armory, a weapon foundry that was founded during the late Golden Age, known for creating valuable and high quality weapons. Despite the initial hostility from Ada, due to her distrust of Guardians, the Guardian eventually earns her trust and wares, slowly piecing together the identity of the Black Armory's mysterious assailant who has been stealing the Lost Forges—used by the Black Armory to craft their weapons—for themselves. After discovering three of the forges—Volundr in the European Dead Zone, and Gofannon and Izanami on Nessus—the Guardian discovers that the mystery assailant is a Fallen captain named Siviks, Lost to None, the forsaken brother of the Spider and leader of Kell's Scourge a Fallen syndicate and rival of Spider's gang. Siviks, seeking to plunder the Black Armory vault in the Last City, dispatches an invasion force led by Insurrection Prime, a Prime Servitor built into an immense bipedal war machine. A fireteam of Guardians confront and destroy the machine at a desolate section of the city housing the vault ("Scourge of the Past" raid), which later prompts the revelation of the last Forge, Bergusia, and its location in the European Dead Zone. Upon discovering and igniting the Bergusia Forge, the Guardian is able to unlock a mysterious box, containing a unique weapon frame, the likes of which Ada claims to have never seen. After a lengthy quest involving returning to Eleusinia and once more igniting the Bergusia Forge, the Guardian returns to Ada and forges the exotic sniper rifle Izanagi's Burden, the same weapon used by Ada centuries prior to take vengeance on the founders' murderers. One last time, the Guardian returns to the Bergusia Forge and confronts Siviks, killing him and returning a device known as the Obsidian Accelerator to her, restoring her lost memory and rebuilding the Black Armory once and for all.

Sometime after the defeat of Siviks, the Drifter summons the Guardian to the Tower and gives them a tainted Hive artifact for them to cleanse using their Light. The Guardian defeats several Hive as well as Guardians in the Crucible, and then heads to Titan where a Hive ritual to create a Weapon of Sorrow is taking place. After disrupting the Hive ritual, the Drifter then advises the Guardian to sully their Light in order for them to stop a Hive weapon master from creating more Weapons of Sorrow. The Guardian taints their Light by defeating more Guardians in the Crucible, collecting Hive crystals and larvae, as well as disrupting Hive summoning rituals on both Titan and Mars. After doing so, the Drifter contacts the Guardian, stating he has located the Hive weapon master, Enkaar, the Anointed, on the Tangled Shore. The Guardian travels to the Tangled Shore and confronts Enkaar. Out of nowhere, the exotic hand cannon The Last Word appears before the Guardian and they use it to defeat Enkaar for good. The Guardian returns to the Drifter afterwards, who is extremely furious to see the Guardian wielding the fabled weapon, stating he knows its previous owner; the Drifter then warns the Guardian to not betray his trust.

=== Season of the Drifter ===
Shortly after the events of Season of the Forge, the Guardian is summoned by the Drifter, who has moved down to the Annex. The Drifter invites the Guardians to participate in his new scam called Gambit Prime; he also invites the Guardian to visit his ship, the Derelict, after completing a few matches. The Guardian, upon exploring the Derelict, discovers that the mysterious haul tied to the back of the ship, upon entering, leads into the realm of the Nine in unknown space. The Guardian fights waves upon waves of Taken inside the haul, including powerful Taken facsimiles of Nokris and Oryx. The Guardian also meets the Emissary of the Nine inside the haul, who reveals to the Guardian that it was the Nine who gifted the Drifter with the haul itself, and that the Taken and Primevals that the Drifter uses in Gambit originate from there, created by the Darkness and the Drifter's force of will. The Drifter finds out about this and advises the Guardian to not trust the Nine and to stop contacting the Emissary; he reveals that the Emissary was an Awoken named Orin who was close to Mara Sov before dying and being resurrected as a Guardian, and that she sought the Nine to gain power and was subsequently transformed into the Emissary. Despite the Drifter's objections, the Guardian continues to make contact with the Emissary via Xûr, a servant of the Nine over the course of nine weeks, which leads to a dark omen from the Emissary, foretelling the return of the Darkness.

During these events, the Guardian is contacted by a Praxic Order Warlock named Aunor Mahal, who strongly advises the Guardian to not trust the Drifter—Aunor has been investigating the Drifter due to his connection with the Shadows of Yor, a group of renegade Guardians known as Dredgens who idolize Dredgen Yor, a former Titan who had been corrupted by the Hive and the Darkness and killed by Shin Malphur, a legendary Hunter who was also the previous owner of The Last Word exotic weapon; the Drifter has been training Guardians to become Dredgens themselves through Gambit. As a result, Aunor has made several attempts to persuade the Vanguard to expel the Drifter from the Tower by any means necessary. In light of this revelation, the Drifter contacts the Guardian and asks where the Guardian's loyalties lie—whether if the Guardian remains loyal to the Vanguard or if the Guardian fully trusts the Drifter. Regardless of the decision made by the player, the Guardian learns more about the Drifter and his past through a series of recordings scattered throughout the European Dead Zone. In the recordings, it is revealed that the Drifter was resurrected by a Ghost during the Dark Age of humanity, becoming one of the first Guardians known as the "Risen" at the time, but he did not trust the Traveler's Light nor the Ghost that revived him. After several years trying to survive and live a normal, peaceful life despite getting into several conflicts with other Risen, the Drifter departed the Solar System during the onset of the City Age with a crew in search of a power "greater than Light". It was also revealed that the Drifter was also part of the Shadows of Yor for a short time until he had a falling out with a fellow Shadow named Callum Sol, followed by a testy confrontation with Shin Malphur; the Drifter also warns of an impending second Collapse, and that the Reckoning activity in the Derelict's haul was created to prepare Guardians for the looming apocalypse.

Sometime later, the Guardian discovers a Fallen transponder on Titan, left behind by Mithrax, the Forsaken, a friendly Fallen who was initially encountered and spared by the Guardian during the Red War, and has since become their steadfast ally. The Guardian deciphers the transponder by finding six data nodes throughout the EDZ and Nessus; after retrieving the six data nodes, the Guardian uncovers rendezvous coordinates, leading them to Mithrax himself, hiding out in the basement of an old building on the Farm. Mithrax brings the Guardian to the ruins of the old Tower in the Last City, where Fallen House of Devils loyalists have broken into the Cryptarch vault deep within and have stolen preserved SIVA tech ("Zero Hour" exotic mission). The Guardian and Mithrax invade the old Tower ruins and neutralize Siriks, Loyal to Eramis, the Fallen captain behind the heist. After defeating Siriks, Mithrax recovers and gives the Guardian the SIVA-powered exotic pulse rifle Outbreak Perfected, in order to prevent the Fallen from using SIVA ever again. (Note: Mithrax's narrative continues into Destiny 2: Beyond Light in Season of the Splicer and Destiny 2: The Witch Queen in Season of Plunder.) The Drifter eventually notices the Guardian's efforts, and asks the Guardian to "grab something" for him the next time they are in the old Tower ruins.

=== Season of Opulence ===
Following the events of Season of the Drifter, the Guardian is given an imperial summons by Benedict 99-40 (who had also moved to the Annex in the Tower) on the orders of Emperor Calus of the Cabal. The Guardian is invited to partake in treasure hunts across the Solar System, as well as exploring the Leviathan's Menagerie—described by Calus as the ship's oldest deck and once served as a prison for the Emperor and his Loyalist Cabal after Ghaul usurped Calus's throne and sent them into exile, now turned into an arena that pits Vex and Hive captured by Calus against Guardians for the Emperor's own entertainment—and other tasks that the Emperor has created for them. After participating in the Menagerie, the Guardian returns to Werner 99–40 on Nessus and is informed by Calus that one of his Loyalist Shadows, Gahlran, the Sorrow Bearer, was given a Hive artifact called the Crown of Sorrow in an attempt to control the Hive, but instead triggered a trap laid by the Hive Queen Savathûn, causing Gahlran to fall under her control; as a result, the Leviathan has been overrun by the Hive. Wanting the Leviathan cleansed of the Hive infestation and his former Shadow put down, a fireteam of Guardians assembled by Calus make their way into the vessel's treasure vaults deep within the Menagerie and confront Gahlran ("Crown of Sorrow" raid). With the aid of Savathûn's magics, the Guardians slay the mad Shadow, rendering the Crown of Sorrow inert. Calus rewards the Guardians with treasure and formally makes them his Shadows.

Sometime after the defeat of Gahlran, Calus invites the Guardian to the Leviathan, where the Emperor has erected a tribute hall on board the vessel to celebrate the Guardian and their legacy. At first, the hall is empty, but Calus advises the Guardian to complete tasks across the Solar System to earn golden tribute statues for the hall. After the Guardian fills the hall with some tributes, a portal to the Taken Ascendant Realm appears in the middle of the hall, indicating that the Leviathan was pulled partially into the Ascendant Realm as a result of the Crown of Sorrow's influence. The Guardian ventures into the Ascendant Realm and defeats both Taken originating from the Hellmouth on Earth's Moon and Calus' Loyalists deep within ("The Other Side" exotic mission). After surviving the onslaught, the Guardian escapes the Ascendant Realm and returns to the tribute hall, where a display case below the Ascendant portal unlocks and rewards the Guardian with the exotic pulse rifle Bad Juju.

The events of Destiny 2: Shadowkeep follow.

== Release ==
Released on September 4, 2018, Forsaken, which began Year 2 of Destiny 2's life cycle, was available as paid downloadable content (DLC) and was originally only available to owners of Destiny 2 and the two prior expansions, Curse of Osiris and Warmind—with the release of the free-to-play version of Destiny 2 called Destiny 2: New Light on October 1, 2019, previous premium content was no longer required to own Forsaken or future expansions. At release, Forsaken was also available as part of an SKU of Destiny 2 known as the Destiny 2: Forsaken Legendary Collection, which featured the game and all downloadable content up to and including Forsaken. A Digital Deluxe Edition was also available and included extra DLC, such as a legendary set of armor for each class. Per an exclusivity agreement with Sony Interactive Entertainment, certain content in Forsaken was exclusive to the PlayStation 4 platform until fall 2019. This content included a Strike, a legendary gear set for each class, a ship, and an Exotic weapon. Furthermore, players who purchased Forsaken received an item that boosted one character to the minimum level needed to play the game's content.

=== Post-release content ===
Upon release of Forsaken, Bungie also released an Annual Pass that players could purchase either bundled with or separate from Forsaken (though the expansion was required to access the Annual Pass content). The Annual Pass included three pieces of premium downloadable content, each filled with new activities, gear, lore, and a power increase within each content drop. The first content drop, Season of the Forge, released on December 4, 2018, followed by Season of the Drifter on March 5, 2019, and then Season of Opulence on June 4, 2019. Both Season of the Forge and Season of Opulence included a new raid. The Annual Pass was the introduction of a seasonal model for Destiny 2, in which smaller content packages are released periodically throughout the year between the releases of the major expansions. All of the content of the Annual Pass became free to all owners of Forsaken on September 18, 2019, just prior to the release of New Light and the next expansion, Shadowkeep, which changed the way in which seasonal content is purchased and delivered. With the release of the Beyond Light expansion on November 10, 2020, the content of the Annual Pass was removed from the game and entered into the Destiny Content Vault (DCV), with the exception of Gambit Prime, which was slightly reworked and became the new Gambit, replacing the three-round version originally introduced with Forsaken. Bungie stated that content entered into the DCV may be remastered and reintroduced into Destiny 2 at a later time.

The "Festival of the Lost" Halloween event returned and ran from October 16 to November 6, 2018, culminating in a 3-week murder mystery quest that rewarded players with a returning Destiny exotic, Thunderlord. The holiday season-themed event "The Dawning" also returned and lasted from December 11, 2018, to January 1, 2019, which saw the return of Eva Levante, an NPC from the original game who served as the main vendor for the event. The Valentine's Day-themed event "Crimson Days" also returned and ran for one week from February 12 to 19, 2019. A new spring-themed event called "The Revelry" ran from April 16 to May 6, 2019, with Eva Levante as the returning vendor for the event. The yearly "Moments of Triumph" event returned on July 9, 2019, and the Solstice of Heroes summer event returned on July 30, with Eva Levante once again as the main vendor for the event.

On release of The Witch Queen in February 2022, portions of Forsaken were removed from the game and placed in the Destiny Content Vault. This included the Forsaken campaign and the Tangled Shore destination and its associated activities, but not the Dreaming City destination or its endgame content. Ahead of this, Forsaken's campaign was made free-to-play on December 7, 2021, and a special Forsaken Pack, containing access to the expansion's endgame content and exotics, was made available for players to purchase who did not own the Forsaken expansion.

== Reception ==
Reception

Aggregate score
| Aggregator | Score |
|---|---|
| Metacritic | PC: 84/100; PS4: 82/100; XONE: 86/100 |

Review scores
| Publication | Score |
|---|---|
| Destructoid | 7/10 |
| Game Informer | 9.25/10 |
| GameSpot | 8/10 |
| GamesRadar+ | 4/5 |
| IGN | 9/10 |
| PC Gamer (US) | 86/100 |
| PCGamesN | 8/10 |

Destiny 2: Forsaken received "generally favorable" reviews, according to review aggregator Metacritic.

The Verge praised the tone of the expansion's story, saying that Forsaken had "sharper writing, a darker tone, more clever humor, and a non-linear structure that rethinks how Bungie tells stories in this universe". Destructoid liked the new locations, singling out the Dreaming City as "great", "Having a giant challenging zone that sort of “intros” the upcoming raid is a genius idea, and is much more pointed than anything they've done in the past... I'm genuinely more invested in the upcoming Last Wish raid, given that I'm spending time right outside its gates". The Washington Post enjoyed how Gambit fused cooperative and competitive gameplay, "Gambit is tailor-made for a person like me, someone who gravitates to co-op but doesn't mind a dash of player-vs-player every now and then". GamesRadar+ felt that the new subclass trees added more variability to the gameplay, " the Hunter's Blade Barrage and Warlock's Nova Warp ensures every class feels like a superhero discovering their new powers all over again, with the potential for experimental fireteam compositions once again significantly raised".

Game Informer criticized how infusing equipment was too expensive, and how exotics were difficult to obtain, "All of this combines to limit the ability to experiment with playstyles or gear setups, and hides much of the best equipment and variety so deep into the grind that many players may never encounter those experiences". IGN liked the expansion's main missions, saying that "each of them comes to a head with an interesting boss battle featuring unique mechanics or challenges to overcome". PC Gamer praised the new activities, feeling they added more things to do during the endgame, "More difficult challenges reward bigger power jumps, but the smaller, easier ones are just as important and exciting because they give me short-term goals to tide me over until the next big challenge". GameSpot liked the activities available in the Dreaming City, praising the Blind Well, but singling out the Ascendant Challenge as a highlight, "It changes each week (so far) and can include things like platforming activities or challenging boss fights in a creepy, Taken-filled alternate plane". PCGamesN enjoyed the Gambit mode, feeling it was endlessly replayable, "It's accessible, offering something to fans of both PvE and PvP, yet also deep, as opportunities for team synergy abound. Matt reckons it's Bungie's best idea since Halo, and I'm inclined to agree: it may be the most original feature in Destiny, and it's terrific fun".

During the 22nd Annual D.I.C.E. Awards, the Academy of Interactive Arts & Sciences nominated the Forsaken expansion for "Action Game of the Year" and "Online Game of the Year".
