= Eris Morn =

Destiny supporting character

- Destiny character
- Promotional art of Eris Morn for Destiny: The Dark Below
- First appearance: Destiny: The Dark Below (2014)
- Created by: Bungie
- Voiced by: Morla Gorrondona

Eris Morn is a character from Bungie's Destiny video game series. She first appears as a supporting non-player character in Destiny: The Dark Below, the first post-release downloadable content (DLC) pack for the 2014 video game Destiny, who possesses expert knowledge of the alien threat known as the Hive. She is usually presented as an advisor, quest-giver and item vendor within the Destiny series, although she has occasionally played a proactive role to assist the Guardians, protectors of Earth's last safe city.

Eris Morn is voiced by Morla Gorrondona, who also voiced members of the Hive species in the Destiny series. Gorrondona continued to voice the character in her subsequent appearances in the series and was consistently given creative freedom to interpret the character's emotional state. Eris Morn has been the subject of merchandise and promotional material, and is noted by commentators as one of the most prominent characters of the Destiny series' and an important aspect of its lore.

== Development and portrayal ==
Eris Morn was developed as part of Bungie's efforts to deliver story missions which flesh out the Hive faction as part of post-launch expansion pack content released to support the first Destiny following criticism of its lack of meaningful story content. Eris is voiced by American actress Morla Gorrondona, who also provides the screeches and screams of various Hive enemy units like the Thralls and the Wizards. Several Bungie team members elaborated the direction and tone of the series in detail for audition hopefuls in order to illustrate their vision for who they wanted Eris to be. During Gorrondona's audition for Eris, a Bungie staff member told her that it would be "poetic" for the character to be played by the same person who voiced the Hive since she had lived among them for a time. Gorrondona secured the role of Eris, as well as a Hive leader named Omnigul, in part due to positive feedback from the team for her voice work with the Hive, which demonstrated her creative use of diction as well as an aptitude for "vocal gymnastics".

A lifelong video game enthusiast, Gorrondona is a player of the Destiny series herself, though she has acknowledged that the series' complicated lore may be difficult to follow even for an insider like her who has worked on the games. Gorrondona cited instances where she listened to an explanation provided by a developmental team member, but needed to have it repeated to her again as she did not fully understand the context of what was being said. Although Bungie had pre-established ideas about the creative direction for Eris, Gorrondona was allowed the freedom to interpret her character's emotional state as she saw fit. To prepare for the role, Gorrondona drew from her experience working in professional theatre to develop the minute details of her personality, as well as her training in improv techniques which allowed her to "make decisive but not obvious choices within seconds". She believed that these two opposing ways of thinking and creating gave her the ability to develop a robust backstory and give her character emotional heft relatively quickly, an advantage in her opinion as time management is an important factor in video game development. A priority for Gorrondona following her casting is to do justice to the character's emotional state in all her performances; to ground Eris Morn without reducing her into a caricature of a spooky character, Gorrondona drew from her personal experiences to convey the impression that Eris' "strong, meaningful and comparable emotions" are connected with something from reality. She described Eris' early appearances in expansion content for the first Destiny as "slowly slipping into madness after her time spent with the Hive", and that is due to her inner conflict because she has an "odd reverence" for her tormentors that is only matched by her desire to see them destroyed. For her subsequent major appearance in Destiny 2: Shadowkeep, Eris is literally haunted by the ghosts of people from her past, which are manifested by a mysterious structure introduced in the expansion. Gorrondona described her as being emotionally burdened in a way that the general audience would think that she was burdened before, but now it has become a physical one.

In a 2019 interview with Fanbyte, Gorrondona said that she felt more connected with the character of Eris Morn and the Bungie developmental team on a personal level compared to her other roles. From her perspective, Eris is also indicative of an emerging cultural shift within the video game industry in terms of the representation of women and how female characters are portrayed in the medium. Noting the diversity of contemporary female video game characters by the late 2010s, she felt that she no longer feels obliged to deliberate on whether or not to accept the role of a shallow, hypersexualized female character due to the abundance of opportunities to portray "powerful and substantial" ones instead.

A 2021 report by IGN on allegations of toxicity within Bungie's workplace culture claimed that the character's involvement in the games' storylines, which were planned by male narrative studio leads, often leaned on harmful stereotypes of women and their perceived mental health struggles in spite of vocal objections from dissenting voices across the studio.

== Appearances ==
Eris' first appeared in the Tower during The Dark Below, an expansion pack which was released a few months after the first Destiny. She is presented as a forlorn character who speaks in riddles and surrounds herself with ominous-looking artifacts. Taking advantage of an internal struggle within the Hive faction, she directs the Guardians to destroy Crota’s crystal and kill his partner, the witch Omnigul. After the campaign’s completion, Eris helped players travel into the Hellmouth and permanently slay Crota inside his Throne World, a pocket dimension generated by powerful Hive leaders which preserve their lives in the material world, during the Crota’s End raid event.

In The Taken King expansion, chronologically set after the events of The Dark Below, Crota's father Oryx invaded the solar system to seek revenge. Eris warns the Guardian Vanguard leadership at the Tower about the threat posed by Oryx's Taken, a faction which consists of ghostly-looking corrupted versions of regular enemies. She also works behind the scenes with Mara Sov, queen of the Awoken people, and the disgraced Guardian leader Osiris in response to the Taken invasion. At the culmination of the story arc of The Taken King, Eris assists the Guardians to reach the Taken Dreadnaught ship, where Oryx is defeated.

Eris did not appear in the Red War story campaign of Destiny 2, as she had left the original Tower prior to the Cabal invasion. The lore book Truth to Power, which appears in Destiny 2: Forsaken, is presented as a dispatch from Eris that reveals information about her life in St. Petersburg, Russia during the Golden Age, a centuries-long prosperous era in human history prior to the events of the Destiny series.

Eris reappears in Shadowkeep, where she discovers a giant Pyramid ship buried under the surface of Earth's moon, and finds herself haunted by the ghosts of her old fireteam after she accidentally activates the structure. Realizing that the Pyramid ship is connected to The Darkness, the ancient enemy of the Traveler, Eris contacts the Guardians for aid. She assists her allies in defeating Nightmares, which are manifestations of Darkness energy manipulated by the Moon’s Hive presence that take on the appearance of the Guardians' major enemies from the past. The Guardians eventually make their way inside the Pyramid on her direction after she helps them craft armor to protect against its corrupting influence. The Guardians return with a strange artifact and leave it with Eris for further research. After the Guardians helped banish her personal Nightmares, Eris visits the Pyramid herself, where she discovers that her Ahamkara talisman accidentally absorbed some of the Dark energy.

By the events of Beyond Light, Eris has discovered how to wield the power of The Darkness against the various enemy factions of humanity that are also empowered by it. She travels to Europa, one of Jupiter's moons, alongside the Drifter and the Exo Stranger to participate in the fight against the Fallen faction led by Eramis. Using ice-based abilities that can freeze enemies known as Stasis, which are derived from their knowledge of wielding the Darkness, the trio assist the local Guardian forces to attune to Europa's Pyramid ship structure and guide them in the use of Stasis powers. A unlockable in-game lore book titled The Dark Future details an alternate future timeline where the Darkness has won a decisive victory against the Traveler and the Guardian faction, and where Eris has become a powerful villain who leads a large alliance of evil beings after she is corrupted and possessed by the Darkness.

A physical lorebook that is included with the collector's edition of Destiny 2: The Witch Queen reveals that Mara Sov had survived the events of The Taken King and that she had been in contact with Eris Morn between the events of Forsaken and Shadowkeep. Eris' knowledge of the Hive and of Savathûn, the Witch Queen, become essential for the Vanguard to deal with Savathûn's latest threat during events of The Witch Queen. After Savathûn was defeated by the Guardian within her throne world, the Vanguard began to prepare for the Witness’s arrival and one of the Witness’s envoys, Calus, began to commune with the Lunar Pyramid to ascend into a Disciple of the Witness, unleashing the Nightmares once again and beginning the event of the second season of The Witch Queen year, Season of the Haunted. Eris used her knowledge of the Nightmares from Shadowkeep to guide Crow, Zavala, and Empress Caiatl through their worst traumas made manifest through the Nightmare tormenting them. For Crow, he faced against the Nightmare of Uldren, his past self; for Zavala, he faced against the Nightmare of Safiyah, his deceased wife; for Caiatl, he faced against the Nightmare of Dominus Ghaul, her former idol. Her knowledge would be used well as her and the Guardian were able to sever Calus's connection to the Lunar Pyramid by transforming the Nightmares tormenting their allies into Memories, though they were too late to prevent his ascension into a Disciple. Eris would build a bond with the Drifter in the background.

Eris would play a major role during the events of the third season of the Destiny 2: Lightfall year, Season of the Witch. After the Witness created, and then entered the portal to the Pale Heart of the Traveler by linking it to the Veil through Ghost at the end of Lightfall, the Vanguard learned from a submind of Soteria that an "enemy of the Witness" is hiding on Titan, and that its preservation is of significant importance. That enemy was revealed to be Ahsa, a proto-Worm God who held information on the origins of the Witness, its pursuit of the final shape, and the next step to follow it into the portal. After the Coalition rescued Ahsa at the end of Season of the Deep, she revealed that Savathûn must be brought back in order to get the solution they need to follow the Witness. Eris, Ikora, and Immaru, Savathûn's Ghost, would reach a deal: in order for Immaru to resurrect Savathûn, they must first deal with Xivu Arath, who tried to Take Ahsa previously. Eris eventually ascended into the Hive God of Vengeance through a ritual and tasked the Guardian with collecting the tribute she needed to challenge Xivu Arath, uncovering the Deck of Whispers in the process. She gave up her Hive godhood upon using the tribute from the revived Savathûn and the Guardian to banish Xivu Arath from her throne world. However, the Vanguard had not found the solution until a pure Ahamkara egg was uncovered from the Imbaru Engine within Savathûn's Throne World. Eris and the Guardian discovered that an Ahamkara wish serves as the solution the Vanguard needed to follow the Witness into the Pale Heart safely, setting up the events of the final season of ‘’Lightfall, ‘’Season of the Wish.

== Promotion and reception ==
Eris Morn is featured prominently in promotional efforts for various story-driven expansions and downloadable content (DLC) of the Destiny series. At a 2015 panel hosted by IGN, Gorrondona performed in-character during a live voice read which re-enacts a cutscene from The Taken King. The character has also been subject to merchandise. In 2020, TUBBZ released a line of cosplaying duck figurines themed after Destiny characters, which include the likes of Eris Morn and Cayde-6. Along with the Drifter and the Exo Stranger, Eris Morn is part of a collection of character statues by Numskull Design released in 2021.

Several commentators regard Eris Morn as one of the most important characters within the fictional universe of Destiny. In 2016, Glixel staff ranked Eris Morn as among the most iconic video game characters of the 21st century. While attention was drawn to her tragic backstory as a victim of the Hive, they also found amusement in her perpetually grim outlook even during festive seasonal events.

Joshua Rivera from Kotaku described Eris Morn as one of the most controversial and compelling characters in Destiny lore. While acknowledging her backstory to be "truly haunting" and "one of the darkest turns" within the obtuse lore of the series, he also considered her to be a symbol of the old Destiny, a "good poster child for the least fun era of the game" which in his words was "pretentious, overly severe, and with zero self-awareness". Rivera observed that by the release of Destiny 2, "quippy, charismatic characters" like Cayde-6 increased in popularity and overshadowed the dour character archetype represented by Eris Morn, and that several non-player characters even poked fun at her as well as the lacklustre plot of the first Destiny by extension.

Brenna Hillier from VG247 praised Gorrondona's skill as the voice of Eris Morn, highlighting her ability to convey agony and trauma through her voice, as well as a determination to inspire the player character to action in The Dark Below. Rick Marshall from Digital Trends lauded Gorrondona's performance as Eris in The Taken King to be a "pleasant surprise". He highlighted in particular her banter with Nathan Fillion's Cayde-6 as one of the best parts of The Taken King "cryptic, the character's "doom-and-gloom dialogue" made for an effective counterpoint to Cayde-6's charismatic humour.
