= Saint-14 =

Character in the Destiny video game series

- Destiny character
- Render of Saint-14 from Destiny 2
- First appearance: Destiny 2: Season of Dawn (2019)
- Created by: Bungie
- Voiced by: Brian T. Delaney

In-universe information
- Species: Exo
- Occupation: Guardian; Former Titan Vanguard
- Affiliation: Vanguard
- Significant other: Osiris

Saint-14 is a character in Bungie's Destiny video game series. He is an Exo Guardian of the Titan class and a former leader of the Vanguard, the organization responsible for defending humanity's Last City. Saint-14 was initially presented indirectly as a historical character through equipment descriptions and supplementary lore: he protected human settlements, fought the alien Eliksni and disappeared while searching for the exiled Warlock Osiris. He first appears in person in the 2019 Destiny 2 storyline Season of Dawn, in which the player travels through time and prevents his death.

Saint-14 is voiced by Brian T. Delaney. His later storylines explore the discrepancy between his reputation as a human hero and the Eliksni's negative memory of him: human accounts of his exploits emphasize the lives he protected, while Eliksni accounts preserve the fear created by his crusades. After initially opposing Eliksni refugees entering the Last City, he develops a friendship with the Eliksni refugee leader Mithrax and helps defend them. Saint-14 is also the romantic partner of Osiris; Bungie confirmed their relationship in 2020, linking the decision to concerns about queerbaiting and the importance of allowing marginalized audiences to see relationships like theirs acknowledged directly.

Critics have highlighted Saint-14 as an example of Bungie's increasingly character-focused storytelling. Commentary has focused on the gradual construction of his mythology before his actual introduction, the re-evaluation of his violent campaigns from the perspective of their victims, and his development from a legendary warrior into a character capable of questioning his prejudices.

== Development and portrayal ==
=== Construction through lore ===
Before Saint-14 makes his first appearance as part of post-release content for Destiny 2, Bungie established his history through equipment, weapon descriptions and collectible lore dating back to the original Destiny. The exotic armour item Helm of Saint-14 helped construct the character as a symbol of protection before players had met him. Its gameplay effect strengthened defensive abilities, while its description and associated stories presented Saint-14 as a source of courage to those he defended.

Further references established Saint-14 as an early defender of the Last City, a close associate of the Speaker and Osiris, and an exceptionally powerful Titan. The shotgun Perfect Paradox introduced a time loop in which the player-controlled Guardian receives the weapon from his remains before travelling into the past and giving it to Saint-14.

In the 2024 storyline Episode: Echoes, Saint-14 begins questioning whether he is the same person as the individual who originally died in the Infinite Forest or merely a version removed from an alternate point in time. Bungie narrative director Alison Luhrs described the character's uncertainty about his authenticity as a central part of the episode's story.

Saint-14 is voiced by American actor Brian T. Delaney.

=== Relationship with Osiris ===
The relationship between Saint-14 and Osiris was initially communicated through lore describing their concern for one another, his attempt to locate Osiris following his exile, and Osiris's repeated efforts to reverse his death. In November 2020, Bungie narrative designer Robert Brookes publicly confirmed that the characters were gay and romantically involved. Brookes said that he had interpreted the relationship that way before joining Bungie and learned after being hired that the interpretation was correct.

Brookes explained that Saint-14 and Osiris were private characters whose relationship had previously been expressed through implication, but concluded that continued ambiguity could be mistaken for queerbaiting. He regarded explicit confirmation as important because representation could allow LGBTQ audiences to recognize themselves in the characters rather than treating their identities as a puzzle for players to solve. The relationship was later depicted directly within the game via the concluding cinematic for the 2022 Season of Plunder, which shows Osiris addressing Saint-14 as his love, and kissing him.

== Appearances ==
Saint-14 is first referenced in the original Destiny through the Helm of Saint-14 and supplementary lore. He is described as an Exo Guardian who served as the Titan Vanguard and defended the early Last City. He conducted an extended campaign against the Fallen, later known by their own name, the Eliksni, and became celebrated among humanity for breaking their military power. After Osiris was exiled from the City, Saint-14 entered the Vex-controlled Infinite Forest on Mercury while searching for him. The Vex eventually created a machine specifically capable of draining his Light, allowing them to kill him after a prolonged battle.

In Curse of Osiris, the player discovers a memorial containing the apparent remains of Saint-14 in the Infinite Forest. The body is surrounded by Vex that had preserved it out of respect for the number of their kind he destroyed. The associated Perfect Paradox weapon suggests that the player will eventually meet Saint-14 in the past and give him the shotgun that is later recovered from his tomb.

During Season of Dawn, Osiris creates a time-travelling device known as the Sundial in an attempt to locate Saint-14 and prevent his death. The Guardian travels to two periods in his life, first helping him defend human colonists from the Eliksni and later intervening during his final battle against the Vex. Saint-14 returns to the present, settles in the Tower and assumes responsibility for the competitive Trials of Osiris event.

Saint-14 initially remains openly hostile toward the Eliksni. During the 2021 Season of the Splicer, the Vanguard grants refuge in the Last City to the House of Light, a peaceful Eliksni faction led by Mithrax. Saint-14 is assigned to work with Mithrax but dismisses the refugees' fear of living among former enemies. Mithrax responds by recounting an Eliksni story about an unstoppable monster that pursued fleeing families and became a figure used to frighten their children, revealing the monster to be Saint-14 himself. Saint-14 is shaken by this revelation, and gradually accepts that the Eliksni include civilians and refugees rather than being a uniformly hostile population. He develops respect for Mithrax and ultimately fights beside him when the Vex attack the Eliksni quarter of the City.

After Osiris loses his powers and is later found unconscious, Saint-14 remains involved in attempts to restore him. Osiris awakens during the concluding events of Season of Plunder, and the two reunite as a couple.

In the 2024 storyline Episode: Echoes, the Conductor, an entity controlling the Vex on Nessus, exploits Saint-14's doubts about his identity.

== Reception and analysis ==
=== Legend and indirect storytelling ===
Critical interest in Saint-14 predated his introduction in Season of Dawn. Following the release of Curse of Osiris in 2017, David Houghton of GamesRadar+ devoted a feature to an apparent depiction of Saint-14's body in the Infinite Forest. Houghton considered the discovery one of the expansion's most consequential story elements because it connected the character's established history, his relationship with Osiris and the possibility that the circumstances of his death could be revisited through time travel.

Critics have discussed Saint-14 as a retrospective example of Bungie's use of fragmentary lore to establish a character before introducing him directly. Ryan Gilliam of Polygon described Saint-14 as a character who had been referenced as an exotic helmet, a weapon and a collection of lore entries before becoming physically present in the story. Gilliam considered his introduction in Season of Dawn the culmination of a long-running secondary narrative rather than the sudden arrival of a new supporting character. Ethan Gach from Kotaku considered the storyline notable because it made the player part of the legend that had inspired Saint-14 centuries earlier. Gach considered the combination of the Helm of Saint-14, Perfect Paradox and scattered written accounts effective in constructing Saint-14 as a legendary protector whose actions had influenced the player before their eventual meeting. He argued that the Perfect Paradox storyline was particularly effective because it made the player both a beneficiary and an originator of Saint-14's legend.

Gilliam similarly described Saint-14 as one of the franchise's most extensively foreshadowed characters. Gilliam observed that, rather than appearing without preparation in Season of Dawn, Saint-14 entered the active narrative with a reputation already established through years of equipment descriptions and background stories. Saint-14 entered the active narrative with a reputation already established through years of equipment descriptions and background stories. Houghton considered the apparent discovery of the character's corpse in Curse of Osiris more compelling than much of that expansion's central story because it provided a visible payoff to lore concerning both Saint-14 and Osiris.

=== Heroism and historical perspective ===
Saint-14's portrayal during Season of the Splicer received praise for challenging the heroic reputation previously attached to him. Critics considered Saint-14's eventual alliance with Mithrax an example of the series recontextualising rather than erasing his earlier heroism. His legend is instead placed within competing memories of the same conflict, allowing a heroic character to acknowledge the consequences of his violence without becoming a conventional villain.

Hornshaw described Saint-14 as one of humanity's greatest heroes: an immortal warrior who used his power to defend vulnerable people rather than becoming one of the tyrannical warlords who dominated humanity after the Collapse. He argued, however, that Mithrax's account revealed the limits of that heroic narrative by showing that the Eliksni remembered Saint-14 as an indiscriminate and terrifying killer. Hornshaw also considered the confrontation between Saint-14 and Mithrax a major improvement in Destiny 2's storytelling because characters were shown disputing each other's interpretations of history within the game itself. Saint-14's reputation depended upon a human viewpoint in which the Fallen were treated as monsters, while the Eliksni stories transformed Saint-14 into the monster pursuing their families. Hornshaw regarded this reversal as part of the series' movement away from a simple division between heroic Guardians and evil alien races.

Austin Wood of GamesRadar+ similarly argued that the House of Light storyline demonstrated that the Eliksni had always included civilians, refugees and noncombatants, even though Saint-14 and the Vanguard had treated Fallen society as uniformly hostile. Wood described Saint-14 as part of a wider development in which the Guardians themselves were no longer presented as flawless heroes and former enemies were given understandable motives and internal divisions. Clark identified Saint-14's development as one of the clearest examples of Bungie's improved seasonal storytelling. He described Saint-14 as a gruff but compassionate character who struggled to reintegrate into the City after his return, before becoming popular with players. Clark praised the progression from Saint-14's initial prejudice against the Eliksni to his recognition of Mithrax and the House of Light as allies worth defending.

=== Queer representation ===
Coverage of Saint-14's relationship with Osiris has focused on its progression from implied intimacy to explicit representation. In 2020, Ethan Gach of Kotaku noted that some players continued interpreting the relationship as platonic despite increasingly affectionate lore, noting that Bungies's confirmation removed that ambiguity by establishing that both men had been written as gay rather than leaving their relationship to fan speculation.

Ty Galiz-Rowe of Gayming Magazine observed that their later onscreen kiss did not establish a new pairing, but moved a previously confirmed relationship from lore and developer statements into the visible central narrative rather than confining it to supplementary text or external clarification.
