= Destiny 2: Shadowkeep =

2019 expansion of Destiny 2

- Cover art showing the Scarlet Keep fortress on the reprised Moon destination
- Developer: Bungie
- Publisher: Bungie
- Directors: Luke Smith; Steve Cotton
- Composers: Michael Salvatori; Skye Lewin; Rotem Moav; Pieter Schlosser; Josh Mosser; Michael Sechrist
- Series: Destiny
- Platforms: PlayStation 4; Windows; Xbox One; Stadia; PlayStation 5; Xbox Series X/S
- Release: October 1, 2019
- Genres: Action role-playing, first-person shooter
- Mode: Multiplayer

Destiny 2: Shadowkeep is a major expansion for Destiny 2, a first-person shooter video game developed by Bungie. Representing the fourth expansion and the third year of extended content for Destiny 2, it was released on October 1, 2019. It was the first major expansion to be published independently by Bungie after acquiring publishing rights for the series from Activision in early 2019, as well as the first to arrive on Steam rather than the Battle.net client which had been used since Destiny 2's launch. On June 4, 2024, the Shadowkeep campaign became free-to-play for all players, with the rest of the expansion's content repackaged as the Shadowkeep Pack.

The expansion returns players to Earth's Moon as a playable destination, with the location reprised and expanded upon from the original version of the first Destiny (2014). The story sees the return of Eris Morn, who had been absent since the events of Destiny 2's original base campaign. Eris seeks the help of the Guardian in defeating "Nightmares" that she accidentally released into the Solar System after interacting with the dormant Pyramid ship beneath the Moon's surface. The Nightmares are manifestations of the Guardian's past, and players face off against previous adversaries, which are being resurrected by the Darkness, the ancient enemy of the Traveler. Throughout the story, Eris and the Guardian work together to figure out the cause of this unleashed madness and do what they can to put a stop to it. Shadowkeep added content for every aspect of the game; including new missions, new Player versus Environment (PvE) locations, Player versus Player (PvP) maps, weapons, armor, exotic gear, a new dungeon, a new raid, as well as further fundamental changes to the core functionality of the game, including a revamped armor system. A second dungeon was added later with Year 3's fourth season.

Alongside Shadowkeep's release, the original Destiny 2 base game was re-released as a free-to-play title called Destiny 2: New Light. At the time, this free-to-play version featured all of the content of the original Destiny 2 base game, as well as the content from the first two expansions, Curse of Osiris and Warmind, among various other PvE and PvP activities—much of this content, however, was removed from the game when Beyond Light released in November 2020. Upon release of Shadowkeep, it and all future expansions and seasonal content (including the previous expansion Forsaken) were viewed as standalone releases, not requiring the purchase of previous premium content; they only required owning the free-to-play New Light. Shadowkeep had four seasonal content offerings for Year 3 of the game: Season of the Undying, which was available alongside Shadowkeep, Season of Dawn in December 2019, Season of the Worthy in March 2020, and Season of Arrivals in June 2020. Unlike the season's from the prior year, which remained in the game until Beyond Light's release, Year 3's seasons were immediately removed from the game upon the conclusion of each season. This was changed in Year 4, wherein the seasons remained in the game for the entire year and were not removed until the release of the subsequent expansion.

The seasons bridged the events of Shadowkeep to the next expansion, Beyond Light. Following Shadowkeep's campaign, Season of the Undying saw the Sol Divisive Vex launch an aggressive invasion of Earth's Moon, with Ikora Rey and the Guardian initiating a counter-offensive, constructing a massive portal in the Tower to hunt down and eliminate the Vex leader—the Undying Mind—across all timelines. In Season of Dawn, the legendary Warlock Osiris enlisted the Guardian's help to protect the Sundial, a time-traveling device on Mercury, as the Red Legion's Psion Flayers attempted to hijack the device to rewrite history and erase the Vanguard's victory in the Red War, while also rescuing Saint-14 from his demise in an alternate timeline, bringing him to the present. Season of the Worthy saw the Cabal Red Legion send their star-destroying superweapon, the Almighty, on a suicide collision course with the Last City, requiring the Guardian to ally with the Warmind Rasputin and Ana Bray to power up its orbital satellite network and destroy the plummeting vessel. In Season of Arrivals, the Black Fleet of the Darkness arrived in the Solar System, positioning Pyramid ships over Io, Titan, Mercury, and Mars; while Eris Morn and the Drifter decoded the Darkness's messages to understand its intentions, the Traveler reawakened, only for the Darkness to consume the destinations.

== Gameplay ==
Shadowkeep is similar in scale to the original Destiny's fourth expansion, Rise of Iron, and features a "full campaign", two new multiplayer PvE "strike" missions, and one new PvP Crucible map, as well as two reused ones. The expansion features the Moon as a returning, playable destination, where it has been reprised and expanded upon its original patrol mode from the original Destiny. Bungie claimed that the Moon would be twice the size of its original iteration, featuring major changes to the lunar environment, including the erection of a massive Hive fortress on the lunar surface, the Scarlet Keep, that serves as a key area for the expansion. Eris Morn, a character from the original game who had been absent since the events of Destiny 2's base campaign, serves as the main non-player character (NPC) for Shadowkeep. The expansion also introduces a new faction of enemies called Nightmares—spectral manifestations of the trauma from the Guardians' past that have been reanimated by the Darkness and have been accidentally unleashed onto the Moon by Eris. Nightmare enemies are mostly major story bosses from both Destiny and Destiny 2, as well as minor enemies from the Fallen, Hive, Cabal, Vex, and Scorn enemy races, made more powerful by the Darkness and can even regenerate their health. Nightmare enemies can also be found in Lost Sectors. A new raid mission, "Garden of Salvation", was released on October 5, 2019, and takes place in the Black Garden on Mars from the original game; the raid was tied to the expansion's first seasonal content offering, Season of the Undying, which focused on the Vex, who invaded the Moon as a result of players' actions during the raid. A new dungeon, "Pit of Heresy", was added on October 29, and takes place underneath the Scarlet Keep on the Moon. A second new dungeon, "Prophecy", was added on June 9, 2020, upon the release of Season of Arrivals, and takes place in the realm of the Nine in unknown space.

The expansion also features a new PvE activity on the Moon called "Nightmare Hunts", which are unlocked after completing the main campaign of Shadowkeep; they feature powerful Nightmare enemies with a major Nightmare boss at the end. The activity has four new difficulty modes—Adept, Hero, Legend, and Master—with brand new, preset modifiers. The Hero version of the activity released on October 8, while the Legend and Master versions were released on October 15 and 22, respectively. Matchmaking is only available in both the Adept and Hero difficulties. Nightmare Hunts award "Nightmare Essences", materials which are required to craft new weapons and gear through another NPC called the Lectern of Enchantment. A new version of the PvE Nightfall strike activity called "Nightfall: The Ordeal" was released; The Ordeal features a weekly rotating Nightfall strike with the Adept, Hero, Legend, and Master difficulty modes as well (also with preset modifiers), and can award exotic weapons and gear as well as upgrade materials. Unlike the regular Nightfall activity, matchmaking is included in The Ordeal but only on the Adept and Hero difficulties. Legacy Nightfall strikes also remain available for all players. A fifth difficulty exclusively for The Ordeal, Grandmaster, was added on April 21, 2020.

Changes were also made to the Crucible for Shadowkeep—the Control game mode is now in its own separate playlist, while a "Classic Mix" playlist consisting of the Control, Clash, and Supremacy modes is also available. Survival is now the only available competitive mode featuring its own playlist and has been revamped into a 3v3 game mode; a separate "freelance" playlist is available for players who prefer to play Survival in a solo queue. The Crucible Labs playlist also returned during Season of the Undying, which featured a beta version of the 3v3 Elimination mode from the original game's House of Wolves expansion; Elimination has since returned as a permanent game mode as of Season of Dawn. Other Crucible game modes are now featured as two weekly rotating playlists. A new rotating PvP mode called "Momentum Control"—a version of Control where weapon damage is more lethal and abilities are only restored via weapon kills—was released on October 29, 2019.

Trials of Osiris, the pinnacle PvP mode from the original game's House of Wolves expansion and the predecessor to Destiny 2's pinnacle PvP mode Trials of the Nine, was announced on February 25, 2020, alongside the announcement of Season of the Worthy, and returned on March 13, 2020. Similar to its original iteration, Trials is only available every weekend from Friday until the weekly reset on Tuesday, and uses the 3v3 Elimination mode with Power levels enabled; access to the activity is only granted upon a purchase of a "Trials Passage" scorecard with a recommended Power level of 960. Fireteams of three attempt to win as many matches as possible; going flawless with seven wins and no losses grants access to the original Lighthouse social space on Mercury for pinnacle rewards (including Trials gear from the original game), while losing three matches renders the player's scorecard void and a new scorecard must be purchased to continue. Saint-14, a character from the lore of the original Destiny who returned as an NPC in Season of Dawn, serves as the game mode's main vendor and announcer.

The armor system of Destiny 2 received a major overhaul with Shadowkeep. The "Armor 2.0" system rebuilds many of the functional aspects of the former armor system, allowing players more customization and control over their characters and their armor. Armor 2.0 allows players to use an "energy system" within each armor piece in order to equip armor mods; each mod acquired can be reused indefinitely, which allows for more experimentation and customization. Mods come either as a general mod or an elemental mod. Elemental mods must have the same energy type (Arc, Solar, or Void) that matches the armor piece's energy type in order for them to be equipped. General mods, however, can be equipped as normal. Each mod has an energy cost to them depending on its type, function and how powerful they are; players can upgrade armor pieces to increase their energy capacity to allow for the use of more powerful mods, and armor pieces get a small stat boost when they are fully upgraded. As of Season of the Worthy, players can change each armor piece's energy type by spending upgrade materials. Armor 2.0 also reintroduces the Intellect, Discipline, and Strength stats from the first Destiny game, which allows players to reduce the cooldown times of their super, grenade, and melee abilities, respectively. Each armor piece also features a "Universal Ornament" slot, where players can change the aesthetic appearance of any Armor 2.0 piece to look like any Eververse armor pieces if they were already purchased and/or unlocked from Eververse or season passes. These ornaments do not impact gameplay. The Majestic Solstice armor earned during the Solstice of Heroes event during Season of Opulence was updated to the Armor 2.0 system; players have access to the Armor 2.0 version of the armor set via Banshee-44 if they have fully upgraded their Solstice armor to its Majestic level during Solstice of Heroes. All other armor sets (including exotic armor) were also updated to the Armor 2.0 system.

Shadowkeep also introduced "finishers" as a new gameplay ability. These new abilities put a marker above enemies when their health is below a certain threshold, which indicates that a finisher can be performed. Functionally, these moves can be modified through armor mods that make them more powerful, or provide different kinds of benefits to the player. These benefits come at a cost; for example, being made vulnerable during the move animation or losing some super energy. The finisher animation is entirely separate from the functional aspect, so players can choose the gameplay function they want and match with a finishing animation that they like the most. Different finisher animations can be acquired similarly to emotes within the game, either through Eververse, in-game gameplay challenges, or from the season pass. The armor mods, which give finishers their functional gameplay aspect, can only be acquired through gameplay means. Upon launch, the feature was restricted to a single animation equipped at a time; as of Season of Dawn, it has expanded upon to allow a random, multi-finisher functionality.

The expansion also brought back artifacts, a gameplay feature that was originally introduced in the first Destiny with The Taken King expansion and expanded upon in Rise of Iron, but had been absent from Destiny 2. With the release of Shadowkeep, artifacts are seasonal, meaning that at the end of each season, players lose their current artifact and its associated mods and gain a new one at the beginning of the next season. Players are able to enhance their characters and gameplay abilities by leveling up their artifact through earning experience points (XP). Seasonal artifacts also grant seasonal mods that players can equip on their armor and weapons; some of these mods are required in order to defeat powerful versions of enemies called "Champions" featured in each season's exclusive seasonal activity; in the Hero, Legend, Master, and Grandmaster versions of Nightfall: The Ordeal and Nightmare Hunts; as well as the Garden of Salvation raid. These artifacts, and their seasonal limitations and mods, allow for experimentation with new and different gameplay abilities. Gameplay abilities that are favored by players can be further expanded upon in later seasons with new seasonal artifacts.

The Power level cap was increased to 960 upon the expansion's release; new and existing players' Power levels were automatically increased to the new minimum Power level of 750 upon the release of both Shadowkeep and the free-to-play New Light version of the base game. Bungie also made some changes to Power progression in Shadowkeep—Prime Engrams, which were first introduced in Forsaken and granted gear that provided a large boost to players' Power levels, are now awarded after players reach Power level 900. Players accrue Prime Engram charges while increasing their Power level from 750 to 900, which allow Prime Engrams to drop more often once the first soft level cap of 900 is reached. Legendary weapons and gear obtained through random drops during regular gameplay now have a chance to drop at players' current Power levels. Once players reach the second soft level of 950, they can further increase their Power level to 960 by participating in pinnacle endgame activities (such as raids, Nightfall: The Ordeal strikes, Master Nightmare Hunts, Iron Banner and Trials of Osiris), which reward pinnacle gear up to Power level 960. Players can then further increase their Power level beyond 960 by upgrading their seasonal artifact through earning XP via gameplay and completing vendor bounties; seasonal artifacts also serve as an alternate Power progression source for players who choose not to participate in pinnacle endgame activities, and are shared across all of a player's characters.

=== Seasonal changes ===
Seasons and seasonal content also received a major overhaul with the release of both Shadowkeep and New Light. There were four named seasons with the release of Shadowkeep, with each season lasting ten weeks (with the exception of Season 11, Season of Arrivals, which was extended by a few weeks due to the delay of the next expansion, Beyond Light). Also introduced were "seasonal ranks", which work as battle passes. Seasonal ranks are divided into a free track and a premium track, with each track granting rewards at any given tier; there are 100 tiers for both tracks. Season pass holders had access to both the free and premium tracks, as well as season-exclusive weapons and gear, materials, universal ornaments, and exotic quests. Only players who purchased the season passes had access to each season's exclusive seasonal activity, which players' actions during these activities had major effects on the game world and progressed the story forward. Unlike the previous year (Year 2), these seasonal activities became unavailable at the conclusion of each season during Year 3.

After the first season, Season of the Undying, each season saw an increase in the maximum Power level for gear. Season of Dawn saw the Power level caps increased to 960 for the second soft cap and 970 for the pinnacle cap; Season of the Worthy then saw a further Power level increase to 1000 for the second soft cap and 1010 for the pinnacle cap, then to 1050 for the second soft cap and 1060 for the pinnacle cap in Season of Arrivals. Beginning in Season of the Worthy, bonus Power levels granted by the seasonal artifact are disabled in Iron Banner and Trials of Osiris; Bungie stated plans to implement a seasonal artifact Power cap for said activities sometime later during the season.

Season of the Undying (Season 8), which was available alongside the release of Shadowkeep, featured a new six-player match-made PvE activity, called Vex Offensive, taking place in the Black Garden, which was released alongside the "Garden of Salvation" raid. Players would fight through several waves of Vex before they faced the Undying Mind. The season's artifact was the Gate Lord's Eye (featuring mods focusing on mid-range weapons and Void and Arc abilities).

Season of Dawn (Season 9) added a new six-player match-made PvE activity, the Sundial, in which players would fight Cabal forces on Mercury trying to change the past. Further, special obelisks were added to the Tangled Shore, Earth's European Dead Zone, Mars, and Nessus, and eventually a central one in the Tower, serving part of this narrative; players could spend special game currency earned from other activities to enhance each obelisk's level and gain rewards such as gear and mods. A new single player activity called the "Corridors of Time" also included a large puzzle that required the community to work together to solve, resulting in the ability for players to acquire Bastion, one of the season's exotics. The season also introduced players to Saint-14, a Titan from the lore of the original Destiny, who became a seasonal vendor located in the Tower Hangar. The seasonal artifact was the Lantern of Osiris (featuring mods focusing on long-range weapons and Solar and Void abilities).

Season of the Worthy (Season 10) introduced Seraph Bunkers, which were new areas on Earth's European Dead Zone, Io, and Earth's Moon, which were underground bunkers controlled by the Warmind Rasputin. Players had to clear out these bunkers before they could interact with Rasputin, from which they could spend in-game currency to buy upgrades to these bunkers and other facets related to the season, including special Warmind mods that interacted with the weapons from this season. Players could also enter Legendary Lost Sectors after clearing the bunkers, which were more difficult versions of specific Lost Sectors with greater rewards. A new public activity, "Seraph Towers", was also available on the three featured destinations, which required players to continually defend and power up three towers from numerous forces within a limited time; this activity could be started by any player in the area. The season also saw the return of Trials of Osiris, a 3v3 competitive PvP mode from the original Destiny which has fireteams compete until they either win seven matches or lose three, with rewards based on their overall performance; players who go flawless with seven wins and no losses gain access to the Lighthouse social space on Mercury for pinnacle rewards. After his role last season, Saint-14 became the vendor for the game mode. The seasonal artifact was the Warmind Khanjali (featuring mods focusing on close-range weapons and Arc and Solar abilities).

Season of Arrivals (Season 11) featured a story-based weekly mission for players to fight the Taken in a new area on Io called the Cradle; there were three different missions that rotated weekly, but each week provided new information on the Darkness until the last few weeks of the season, when a new mission became available. A new three-player dungeon, "Prophecy", was also introduced, and takes place in the realm of the Nine. A new Darkness-infused engram was also introduced, called Umbral Engrams, which were decoded at a new terminal in the Annex of the Tower near the Drifter called the Prismatic Recaster; these new engrams could be focused to drop specific weapons and gear. A new public event, "Contact", was also added and rotated between the destinations Io and Titan; any player in the area could initiate the event by interacting with a smaller Pyramid patrol ship, after which, players had to fight through waves of enemies while collecting motes and depositing them into a bank before facing a final boss, similar to Gambit. The seasonal artifact was the Seed of Silver Wings (featuring mods focusing on mid-range weapons and Solar and Void abilities).

== Plot ==
One year after the death of Cayde 6, Shadowkeep focuses on Eris Morn, who had departed from the Tower and remained absent since the events of the Red War that occurred two years ago. Following the events of Season of Opulence, the Guardian is summoned to the Moon by Commander Zavala in response to a disturbance originating from a massive citadel recently erected by the Hive near the Hellmouth called the Scarlet Keep. As the Guardian makes their way to the keep, Ikora Rey contacts the Guardian and reveals that the disturbance was accidentally caused by Eris Morn while she was investigating the Moon, and asks them to find her. The Guardian enters the Scarlet Keep and descends to the caverns below in search for Eris. They eventually discover a derelict alien vessel called the Pyramid (which was teased in the final cutscene of the base game), which Eris had discovered and accidentally activated. The Guardian tries to approach the Pyramid but is pushed back by a barrier emitted by the structure. The Guardian is then suddenly attacked by a phantasmal Nightmare of Crota, Son of Oryx, and an army of Hive; it is soon joined by Nightmares of Dominus Ghaul and Fikrul, the Fanatic, and they begin to overwhelm the Guardian. Eris then contacts the Guardian and teleports them away to safety.

The Guardian is teleported to an alcove overlooking the Pyramid, where Eris is looking over the massive structure, with a phantom of a fallen Guardian floating behind her. Eris explains that the Pyramid is a remnant of the Darkness that may have been struck down by the Traveler during the Collapse, and asks for the Guardian's help in finding a way inside the vessel in hopes of finding something that would help prevent a second Collapse. As the Guardian investigates on how to enter the Pyramid, Eris reveals that the Hive living on the Moon have lived next to the Pyramid for eons due to its connection with the Darkness and they had recently constructed the Scarlet Keep above it as a result to harness its power. The Guardian and Ghost discover that the Hive had exploited the Darkness originating from the vessel in order to control the Nightmares, phantasms created by the Darkness from the Pyramid that are manifested by the traumas of the Guardians' past and appear as enemies previously slain by Guardians; these Nightmares have begun appearing across the Moon and throughout the solar system. The Guardian then gives Eris a Nightmare essence from when they first fought the Nightmare of Crota, with which Eris forges a piece of Dreambane armor that would help protect the Guardian from the dark energies of the Pyramid and be able to bypass its barrier and enter the vessel. Eris then instructs the Guardian to defeat the Nightmare of Omnigul, Will of Crota, in order to collect more Nightmare essence, to which the Guardian does.

After defeating the Nightmare of Omnigul and extracting its essence, Eris forges another piece of Dreambane armor for the Guardian. She then instructs the Guardian to investigate the Scarlet Keep and its tower in hopes of finding more information from the Hive in order to forge more armor. The Guardian makes their way into the keep itself and finds Hashladûn, Daughter of Crota, the architect of the Scarlet Keep who is seeking revenge against the Guardian for the death of her father. The Guardian chases after Hashladûn into the keep and confronts her at the top of its tower. The Guardian defeats Hashladûn and retrieves a Hive tablet that reveals the location of a powerful Hive artifact known as the Cryptoglyph, which the Daughters of Crota have been using to protect themselves from the Pyramid's dark energies and to control the Nightmares; its powers could be used to harness Nightmare essence and craft more Dreambane armor. Eris then sends the Guardian to the bottom of the Hellmouth in order to retrieve the Cryptoglyph. The Guardian finds the Cryptoglyph near the bottom of the Pyramid, and escapes with the artifact after defeating Besurith, Daughter of Crota, and her Hive forces who were guarding it.

The Guardian returns to Eris with the Cryptoglyph, and uses it to empower Eris's Lectern of Enchantment in order to forge more Dreambane armor needed to infiltrate the Pyramid. It is then shown that more phantoms of fallen Guardians are haunting Eris while the Guardian was fulfilling tasks for her; Eris reveals that said phantoms are those of her former fireteam who previously took on Crota prior to the events of the first game. The Guardian then meets with Ikora, who had traveled to the Moon to see the alien vessel with her own eyes. She beckons the Guardian to assist Eris in fighting the Nightmares any way they can. The Guardian then defeats and extracts the essences of the Nightmares of Skolas, Kell of Kells; Taniks, the Scarred; and Phogoth, the Untamed in order to complete the full Dreambane armor set. After completing the full armor set and equipping it, the Guardian descends beneath the Scarlet Keep once more to the Pyramid, and finally manages to bypass the vessel's barrier. Ghost all of a sudden becomes possessed by the Darkness originating from the Pyramid as the Guardian is being drawn into the vessel. The Guardian makes their way through the Pyramid, defeating the Nightmares of Ghaul, the Fanatic, and Crota along the way; the Darkness also taunts the Guardian through Ghost, commenting on the Light's failures and weaknesses. The Guardian then arrives at an altar where an unknown artifact is presented to them; upon touching it, the Guardian is subjected to a vision from within the Black Garden on Mars, with a fleet of Pyramid vessels floating in the sky behind them. The Guardian then encounters the Darkness itself, taking on the form of the Guardian, claiming to be neither friend nor foe, but instead their "salvation".

Upon returning to the surface of the Moon, the Guardian gives Eris the artifact for her to study, and reports what they had encountered inside the Pyramid to the Vanguard in the Tower. Utterly suspicious of what the Darkness spoke to be their salvation, Eris, Zavala, and Ikora conclude that the Darkness is preparing for its return, with a threat of a second Collapse soon to be imminent. As the Guardian continues to work with Eris and the Vanguard to combat the lingering Nightmare threat on the Moon and across the solar system caused by the Pyramid, Eris contacts the Guardian once again and reveals that the artifact began emitting a signal that leads to the Black Garden. Despite Eris's fears that the Darkness is leading them into a trap, a fireteam of Guardians assembled by Eris invades the Black Garden through a newly discovered Vex portal beneath the lunar surface near the Scarlet Keep to follow the signal to its source ("Garden of Salvation" raid). The Guardians make their way through, tracing the artifact's signal while evading the Consecrated Mind, Sol Inherent, which they eventually destroy. They eventually discover another Pyramid-like vessel in the Black Garden's central mesa, guarded by the Sanctified Mind, Sol Inherent. They destroy the Sanctified Mind and enter the vessel, leading them to another altar similar to the one in the Pyramid, where the artifact's signal ends. The Guardian then returns to Eris, who states that the discovery of a second Pyramid-like remnant of the Darkness in the Black Garden enabled the artifact to receive messages directly from the Darkness itself. Eris dismisses these messages as attempts at manipulation, and warns the Guardian to not be swayed by whatever the artifact communicates to them.

Sometime after the invasion of the Black Garden, Eris contacts the Guardian once again, who reveals that the remaining Daughters of Crota, Voshyr and Kinox, have begun performing dark Hive rituals involving sacrificing Nightmares at the Scarlet Keep; Eris believes that the Daughters are attempting through these rituals to harvest the Nightmares' essences for purposes unknown. The Guardian heads to the Scarlet Keep and disrupts the ongoing rituals by killing several Nightmares before they can be sacrificed. Eris then instructs the Guardian to head to the Pit, located in the depths of the Scarlet Keep, to investigate further ("Pit of Heresy" dungeon). A fireteam of Guardians enter the Pit, where they fight their way through and find Zulmak, Instrument of Torment, a powerful Hive warrior who was resurrected by the Daughters of Crota and empowered by the Darkness harvested from the Nightmares. The Guardians defeat Zulmak and return to Eris afterwards, who states that the Daughters have become more dangerous than ever as they had violated the Sword Logic (the religious dogma of the Hive where only the strong survive through slaughter, death, and sacrifice) by resurrecting Zulmak. Eris fears that the Daughters will attempt to resurrect Zulmak again, and she advises the Guardian to remain vigilant.

Throughout the weeks, the Guardian also helps Eris in banishing the phantoms of her old fireteam that continually haunt her. By restoring the memorabilia that once belonged to each of the fireteam members, Eris slowly recovers from grieving over her old friends, and makes peace with their passing. As a result, the phantoms surrounding Eris gradually disappear, one each week. After enhancing the memorabilia with the Lectern of Enchantment, Eris enters the Pyramid by herself and goes to the altar where the Guardian was presented with the unknown artifact, now emitting dark energy. Eris touches the altar, seemingly absorbing the energy from it.

=== Season of the Undying ===
While the Guardian fireteam assembled by Eris invades the Black Garden tracing the unknown artifact's signal, Vex invasion portals suddenly appear on the Moon, sending forth waves upon waves of Vex from the Black Garden. The Guardian is summoned by Ikora to the Tower, stating that armies of Vex have begun invading the Moon en masse from the Black Garden in response to the Guardian fireteam's presence there. Ikora sends the Guardian to the Moon to fend off the Vex and close the invasion portals. The Guardian then speaks to Eris, who has discovered a way into their staging grounds in the Black Garden. The Guardian heads to the Black Garden and hacks the Vex gate network, hoping to slow down the Vex invasion on the Moon. After doing so, the Guardian returns to Ikora, who reveals to them that the Vex have resurrected the Undying Mind (which was the boss of its namesake strike from The Dark Below) as a result of the Guardian fireteam's actions in the Black Garden. The Undying Mind's primary directive is to take control of and seal off the Black Garden from the Guardians, making copies of itself throughout thousands of alternate timelines and learning from its past mistakes. If left standing, however, the Undying Mind could use its secondary directive to attack humanity and destroy the Traveler. Ikora advises the Guardian to continue assisting in fending off and preventing further Vex incursions on the Moon and slowing down their mobilizations in the Black Garden while she devises a plan to find the Undying Mind and end the invasion once and for all.

Over the course of several weeks, Ikora sets her plan in motion by constructing a portal that would be used to summon one of the thousands of copies of the Undying Mind, all while the Guardian continues to push back the Vex and slow down their incursions in the Black Garden. After Ikora completes construction on the portal, the Guardian returns to the Black Garden for their latest offensive against the Vex and activates the completed portal. The portal summons the Undying Mind, which the Guardian successfully destroys. As this was only one of thousands of copies of the Undying Mind that was destroyed, the Guardian, with the help of Ikora, continues to invade the Black Garden and continually destroys the copies one by one until every last one of them has been destroyed for good.

=== Season of Dawn ===
After the defeat of the Undying Mind, Ikora alerts the Guardian that her spy network, the Hidden, has uncovered unusual Cabal Red Legion activity on Mercury. She suspects that her former mentor, the exiled Warlock Osiris is somehow at the heart of it, but has been unable to contact him, and so sends the Guardian to Mercury to find him. Arriving on Mercury, the Guardian finds Osiris at the summit of a massive time machine known as the Sundial, built by Osiris in a failed effort to rescue his closest ally, the legendary Titan, Saint-14, who was killed by the Vex while searching for Osiris in the Infinite Forest. Osiris explains that he witnessed a simulation of a dark future within the Forest as a result of the Undying Mind's defeat by the Guardian; upon returning to reality, he found that a trio of Red Legion Psion Flayers—Niruul, the Hollow Voice; Ozletc, the Sky Piercer; and Tazaroc, the Sun Eater—had taken control of the Sundial and were using it to change history, so that the Legion would emerge victorious in the Red War. Their brute-force attempts to use the Sundial resulted in time becoming fractured on Mercury, and Osiris enlists the Guardian's help to prevent the time fractures from spreading. Osiris dispatches the Guardian to the Tangled Shore to find an obelisk linked to the Sundial, reclaim the parts to repair it from the Cabal there, and then charge it with Light to activate it. Once done, Osiris sends the Guardian to use the Sundial and shut down the timelines created by the Cabal in order to properly calibrate it. Upon defeating the first Flayer, Niruul, the Guardian recovers a strangely-phased object which they deliver to Osiris. In return, Osiris gives the Guardian his Lantern to help them in the battles to come.

With aid from the Guardian, Osiris discovers that the phased object was in fact Saint's shotgun, the Perfect Paradox. Following a unique frequency attuned to the weapon, the Guardian is able to use the Sundial to travel through the Corridors of Time to try and find Saint before he is killed by the Vex. Instead, the Guardian arrives to find Saint in his first off-world mission, fighting Fallen on Mercury, centuries before the events of the first game. After the Fallen are defeated, the Guardian shows Saint a vision of the Last City in order to inspire him to be the hero he would become in the future, and gives him the Perfect Paradox, resulting in a bootstrap paradox: the weapon had actually been crafted by the Guardian themselves at the Infinite Forge on Mercury (played out in a side story in Curse of Osiris), so that they could deliver it to Saint in the past. After the Guardian activates further obelisks on Mars, Earth, and Nessus, Osiris receives a distress signal from Saint's Ghost inside the Vex network, and sends the Guardian to Nessus to enter the network and find it. Upon recovering the dead Ghost and recharging the Sundial, the Guardian again uses it to travel through the Corridors of Time, managing to arrive at the proper moment. Saint's Light has already been drained by Agioktis, Martyr Mind, who was originally responsible for the Titan's death. The Martyr Mind traps Saint in a Vex loop as it fights the Guardian; after a pitched battle, the Guardian manages to weaken it before it traps the Guardian, which releases Saint from his own trap to deliver the final blow. His survival now assured with the death of Agioktis, Saint asks the Guardian to open a gate for him in their own time, while he spends the years in between smashing through the Vex in the Infinite Forest. Returning to their present, the Guardian opens the gateway from the Forest, allowing Saint to return to reality, without alerting the past. Grateful that the Guardian was able to do what he could not, Osiris remarks that the world that Saint knew has changed dramatically, and asks the Guardian to guide him. Saint eventually returns to the Tower, where he and the Guardian build the Tower Obelisk (connecting to the obelisk network) to guide "those who are lost" to the city, and to memorialize the lost colonists of the Golden Age.

Determined to seize control of the Sundial, Niruul, Ozletc, and Tazaroc attempt a melding ritual, combining their physical and mental forms to become Inotam, Oblivion's Triune. The Guardians engage Inotam in the Corridors of Time and defeat them for the final time. They then recover the Sundial's core, rendering it useless in the process, and later install it in the Tower Obelisk. Saint also begins requesting Guardians to make donations of polarized fractaline to the Tower Obelisk for the Empyrean Foundation, a restoration project of the original Lighthouse on Mercury. Upon acquiring sufficient donations, the Guardian then travels to Mercury and uses Osiris' Lantern as a base to light a beacon, beginning the construction of the new Lighthouse and heralding the return of the Trials of Osiris Crucible tournament. Meanwhile, on Mars, Osiris enters the Mindlab of the Warmind Rasputin, weapon ready in hand. As he approaches Rasputin's control panel, Osiris claims the Warmind to be a "thug, murderer and betrayer", questioning his true allegiance.

=== Season of the Worthy ===
After the defeat of the Red Legion at the Sundial, the Psion Flayers had entrusted their youngest sibling Amtec with the task of avenging them, to which she had the Almighty, the disabled Cabal superweapon and space station, moving out of its positioned orbit near the Sun. Zavala and Ana Bray both infiltrate the Almighty, where they discover that the Legion have disabled its systems and send it adrift on a crash course towards the Last City in a final bid to destroy humanity. Zavala summons the Guardian to the Tower and informs them of such; with no other way to stop the Almighty from crashing into the Last City, he asks the Guardian to visit Ana on Mars, who believes that the Warmind Rasputin is able to prevent the catastrophe. The Guardian travels to Mars and speaks to Ana, who advises them that she needs the Guardian's help in convincing Rasputin to activate his defense systems, despite the Vanguard having reservations in arming the Warmind. The Guardian goes to Rasputin's Mindlab, where the Warmind himself agrees to help the Guardian, and gives them an artifact, the Khanjali, to help them in the battles to come.

Rasputin opens a Seraph Bunker in the European Dead Zone, where the Guardian travels to and encounters him again deep within. As the bunker needs to be manually activated and armed, Ana advises the Guardian to activate a Seraph Tower nearby in order to do so. After activating the Seraph Tower and launching an ordnance satellite into space, the Guardian returns to the bunker where the Fallen have invaded its control room, overwhelming both Zavala and Ana. The Guardian clears out the bunker and speaks to both Ana and Zavala afterwards, where they both argue whether or not Rasputin can be trusted to defend humanity. The Guardian then activates the bunker and its defense systems, ready to further arm the Warmind.

After fully upgrading the Seraph Bunker in the EDZ, Rasputin opens two more bunkers on the Moon and Io, respectively, where the Guardian travels to and activates them and their defense systems. As the Guardian enters the Io bunker, however, they encounter Zavala speaking to Rasputin directly inside the bunker's control room. Zavala questions the Warmind's motives as he is shown a holographic map of the solar system, revealing that the fleet of Pyramid vessels (previously seen in Shadowkeep's base campaign) have already entered the Solar System from deep space and are closing in on Earth and the Traveler. Rasputin then temporarily takes control of Zavala's Ghost, revealing to the Titan Vanguard that the Warmind had attempted to protect humanity during the Collapse but ultimately failed. In light of this revelation, Zavala changes his opinion and reservations about the Warmind, allowing both him and Rasputin to settle their differences as they vow to work together to destroy the Almighty and push back the Darkness.

Sometime later, Ana contacts the Guardian, who advises them that Rasputin had detected strange signals coming from the Iron Temple. The Guardian travels to the Vostok Crucible arena on Felwinter Peak, where they discover several pieces of technology dating back to the Dark Age that contained stark revelations about Rasputin—sometime after the Collapse, the Warmind (or at least the fragment left on Earth) sent out combat frames to hunt down a certain Exo, while he also once dropped an entire Warsat to contain an unknown threat in Old Russia. SIVA was also referenced in one of the pieces, suggesting that Rasputin actually used SIVA as bait to lure the Iron Lords to their doom (as depicted in Rise of Iron). Rasputin later summons the Guardian to the lunar Seraph Bunker, where he uses several holograms to tell a story of a "tyrant and his son", with the "tyrant" heavily implied to be Rasputin himself, and the "son" being the Iron Lord Felwinter. It is revealed that Felwinter, an Exo himself, was originally sent by Rasputin with a portion of the Warmind's programming to live among humanity so that the Warmind could learn their ways; following the Collapse, however, Felwinter was killed and resurrected as a Guardian, which Rasputin saw as betrayal, and was hunted down subsequently. Eventually, Rasputin lured Felwinter to his death by promising him SIVA, which he could have used to rebuild the world, which the Warmind eventually came to regret doing. The Guardian travels deeper into the bunker, where they find an old casing of a safety AI, marked with Rasputin's insignia, as well as a sarcophagus containing Felwinter's signature weapon, the Felwinter's Lie shotgun. After acquiring the shotgun, Ana contacts the Guardian, and both of them learn that Rasputin was originally a safety AI for an emergency response system for pre-Golden Age space stations, which was turned into a sentient interplanetary defense system by Clovis Bray. Rasputin's true nature was also revealed to both Ana and the Guardian, revealing that, through Felwinter, Rasputin developed human-like emotion and had shown deep remorse for his actions.

As the Almighty finally appears above Earth's skyline, Rasputin activates his defenses and launches a barrage of missiles at the Cabal space station. The ship explodes mid-air and crashes into the mountains in the outskirts of the Last City, though the Tower is partially damaged by debris in the process. Meanwhile, the Pyramid fleet is shown passing by Jupiter, making their final approach towards Earth and the Traveler.

=== Season of Arrivals ===
After the destruction of the Almighty, Ana Bray and Rasputin continue tracking the Darkness as its Black Fleet makes its way through the Solar System. Rasputin tries to destroy an incoming Pyramid ship as it approaches Io but fails to do so, and gets disabled in the process. Zavala then contacts the Guardian, who sends them to Io to find Eris Morn and bring her back to the Tower in response to the approaching Darkness. The Guardian lands on Io and sees a Pyramid hovering over the Cradle, a city-like structure created by the Traveler prior to the Collapse. The Guardian and Ghost are transported between Io and the throne world of Savathûn, the Witch Queen, as they search for Eris, eventually finding her at the heart of the Cradle under a mysterious arboreal structure called the Tree of Silver Wings. Eris then beckons the Guardian to take one of its Seeds from the Tree as Savathûn's influence prevents her from doing so. With the Seed, the Guardian is able to free Eris and bring her to the Tower.

Eris explains to Zavala that the Darkness had summoned her to Io, but Savathûn had interfered; the Seed the Guardian collected broke that interference. Eris insists on returning to Io to commune more with Darkness to prevent a second Collapse, and Zavala orders the Guardian to help Eris. With the Drifter's help, the Guardian is able to charge the Seed with Dark energy from the Pyramids, allowing the Drifter's machinery to form weapons and armor powered by the Darkness to help their fight against Savathûn's Taken and Hive. As Eris communicates more with the Darkness about their goals and repeats these messages to the Guardian, more Pyramid ships from the Black Fleet appear above Mars, Mercury, and Titan, and the Vanguard fend off further Taken and Hive incursions at these locations.

The Drifter offers the Guardian a way to learn more about the true nature of the Darkness by visiting the realm of the Nine, despite Eris' objections. Via a portal leading to the haul on the Drifter's ship, the Derelict, a fireteam of Guardians enter the realm of the Nine and chase down an echo of a Fallen Kell, resembling that of Eramis, the Shipstealer, through familiar portions of parts of Io, Mars, Mercury, and Titan ("Prophecy" dungeon). Eventually, the Guardians defeat the Kell Echo, using a combined effort of Light and Darkness. The Drifter deduces the answer from the Nine: that Light and Darkness are different in nature, but irrelevant in morality.

More and more Pyramids appear in the affected planets. Zavala, believing that the Guardians must take this matter into their own hands, instructs the Guardian to travel to the invaded planets and meet up with their allies, convincing them to evacuate. The Guardian proceeds to help out Deputy Commander Sloane, Asher Mir, Brother Vance, and Ana Bray in making preparations for the exodus. Several weeks later, the Guardian contacts the allies once more to gather them at the Tower. Ana agrees to join them back on Earth after storing Rasputin's core into a special engram, but the others refuse to leave: Sloane wants to go down fighting, Asher is interested in learning more about the Darkness and takes refuge inside Io's Pyramidion, while Vance evacuates into the Infinite Forest anticipating to meet Osiris again.

Sometime later, the Guardian returns to the Cradle on Io to help Eris decipher one last message from the Darkness. Upon being teleported to Savathûn's throne world, however, they are greeted by Nokris, the estranged son of Oryx and the former Herald of Xol who had fled into the Ascendant Plane after his defeat and allied with Savathûn as her supplicant. The Guardian defeats Nokris permanently and Eris prepares to transport the Guardian back to the Tree of Silver Wings. However, the Darkness possesses Ghost once again and teleports the Guardian to a shrine with a statue of a Pyramid ship, surrounded by effigies of Guardians, Cabal, Fallen, and Hive. The Darkness, through Ghost, once again taunts the Guardian, declaring that an "ancient power" is awaiting them on Jupiter's moon Europa.

At the conclusion of the season, the Guardian returns to the Last City in response to a disturbance coming from the Traveler. They make their way through the city's streets to get a better view, where they witness the Traveler healing itself of its wounds (incurred during The Red War three years prior) in response to the Darkness' presence. Soon, multiple Guardians are shown gathering in the commercial district of the Last City to witness the phenomenon. Eris then contacts the Guardian, commenting that the Traveler healing itself would not result in the end of the conflict between the Light and the Darkness, but escalate it. The Darkness soon consumes Io, Titan, Mercury, and Mars, as a fully healed Traveler unleashes a wave of Light to push it back.

The events of Destiny 2: Beyond Light follow.

== Release ==
Shadowkeep was unveiled on June 6, 2019, and was originally scheduled to launch on September 17, but it was delayed and released on October 1. Beginning Year 3 of Destiny 2's life cycle, Shadowkeep was the first major expansion to be published independently by Bungie after acquiring publishing rights for the series from Activision in early 2019, as well as the first to arrive on Steam rather than the Battle.net client which had been used since the launch of Destiny 2. In addition to the standard version of Shadowkeep, which is available as paid downloadable content (DLC), a collector's edition and a digital deluxe edition were available. Unlike the Annual Pass that was released alongside Forsaken, seasons could be purchased à la carte in the form of season passes. The first seasonal content offering, Season of the Undying, was free to all players who purchased Shadowkeep; subsequently, the season occurring at time of purchase of the expansion was free (e.g., if a player purchased Shadowkeep during Season of the Worthy, that season was free). Players who purchased either the digital deluxe edition or the collector's edition of Shadowkeep at launch or during Season of the Undying were granted access to that season plus the subsequent three seasons. Seasonal rank boosts could also be purchased before the end of each season. Season of the Undying ended on December 10 at which point the second season, Season of Dawn, began and then concluded on March 9, 2020. The third season, Season of the Worthy, began on March 10 and concluded on June 8. The fourth and final season for Shadowkeep, Season of Arrivals, began on June 9 and was originally to conclude on September 21, but was extended to November 9 as the next expansion, Beyond Light, was delayed until November 10 due to the COVID-19 pandemic. As a result, the limited-time Halloween event, Festival of the Lost, instead took place during Season of Arrivals, starting October 6 and running until November 3.

Also alongside Shadowkeep, Bungie released a free-to-play version of Destiny 2 called Destiny 2: New Light, featuring all of the content of the original Destiny 2 base game, as well as the content from the first two expansions, Curse of Osiris and Warmind, access to the full PvE strikes playlist, the competitive PvP playlists and maps, and the hybrid PvE/PvP mode Gambit. Players of New Light also have access to all the playable destinations in the game, including the Tangled Shore, the Dreaming City, as well as the Moon without needing to own either the Forsaken or Shadowkeep expansions, though the expansions are required in order to access their respective story missions and other activities and content. Shadowkeep, as well as Forsaken, and all future expansions and seasonal passes are viewed as standalone releases and do not require the purchase of previous premium content; they only require owning the free-to-play New Light. Much of the free-to-play content was removed from the game with the release of the next expansion, Beyond Light, in November 2020. Free-to-play players now have access to a new player quest (as the original game's Red War campaign was removed), as well as the full PvP playlist, the PvE strike playlist, and the PvE/PvP mode Gambit, in addition to being able to explore all of the destinations.

With the release of The Final Shape expansion on June 4, 2024, the Shadowkeep campaign was made free to play for all players. The rest of the expansion's content, such as the dungeon, raid, and exotic arsenal, were repackaged as the Shadowkeep Pack.

== Reception ==
Reception

Aggregate score
Aggregator	Score
Metacritic	PC: 78/100; PS4:73/100; XONE:73/100

Review scores
Publication	Score
Destructoid	6.5/10
Game Informer	9/10
GameSpot	8/10
IGN	7.9/10
PCGamesN	7/10
USgamer	3/5

Destiny 2: Shadowkeep received "generally favorable" reviews, according to review aggregator Metacritic.

Game Informer praised the new location, liking how it was transformed for the expansion, "It's fascinating to explore what has changed and what has stayed the same, even if it ultimately means that the “new” destination is mostly a rehash of somewhere we've already been". VG247 enjoyed how content was made more accessible, "Shadowkeep's content is available for every player who owns the expansion. There's a lot of grinding, sure, but it's the good kind; it's unlikely we'll see the weird, exclusionary and overly difficult experiences from Black Armory in future seasons". Destructoid felt the new gearing system was an improvement, but criticized the reuse of content in the expansion, "Bungie has come full circle when it comes to reusing old content, as the new zone — the moon — is basically recreated and restructured from Destiny 1, and the “new” enemy type — nightmares — are just existing baddies and bosses with red mist around them". USgamer disliked the grind after the soft power cap, writing that the game became incredibly repetitive, "Just the other night, during an hours long session, I inched from power level 903 to, get this, power level 905... As a consequence, the activity pool effectively slims dramatically post-900. Soon, the only things worth running are Nightfall strikes, weekly bounties, designated challenges, and occasional quests or activities with a Prime Engram reward".

IGN praised the new armor system for allowing more flexibility, but felt the campaign ended too abruptly, "Unfortunately, the excitement ends just as quickly as it begins when, only four or five hours later, the story grinds to a halt so abruptly it might give you whiplash. Precisely when the stakes seem to be the highest, they drop you back into a patrol zone and leave you to discover that the campaign has ended with absolutely no fanfare". While criticizing the lack of change compared to Forsaken, GameSpot enjoyed the new raid added to the game, "Garden of Salvation continues the tradition of including strange and fun mechanics that push your limits of skill and team coordination. It's one of the shorter raids with only four encounters, but includes big, exciting pieces... Garden of Salvation isn't quite the equal of the massive Forsaken raid, Last Wish, but it's a highlight of Shadowkeep for certain". PC Gamer felt the progression was streamlined for the better in Shadowkeep, especially through the ways the player gained XP "There's a renewed focus on bounties now, with each vendor offering a powerful reward if you complete a set number within a week. Thanks to the XP awards now granted by bounties, which award progress along a season pass full of goodies as well as powering up the new seasonal artefact, the steady tick of treats keeps things moving at a nice pace". PCGamesN praised the soundtrack for the expansion, "Shadowkeep's chilling new score – all choral chants and nails-on-a-chalkboard strings – can be heard in Sorrow's Harbour, but really shines in the campaign's creepiest moments; when you're swarmed by Thrall in a reprise of the opening stages of the Crota's End raid, or when the sinister phantoms of dead Guardians flock around you in the depths of the Hellmouth".

During the 23rd Annual D.I.C.E. Awards, the Academy of Interactive Arts & Sciences nominated the Shadowkeep expansion for "Online Game of the Year".
