= Destiny 2 post-release content =

DLC for the video game Destiny 2

There have been several pieces of downloadable content (DLC) released for Bungie's 2017 first-person shooter video game Destiny 2. The packages of downloadable content generally add new player versus environment (PvE) missions and player versus player (PvP) modes, new locales to visit, and new items for the player to make use of. The game has had eight years of extended content. Year One of the game featured two small expansion packs. The first was Curse of Osiris in December 2017, which was followed by Warmind in May 2018.

Year Two began with one large expansion and had three premium content drops, available by way of the Annual Pass, which began Destiny 2's seasonal model. The expansion was Forsaken, which was released in September 2018 and featured an overhaul on gameplay. Upon the release of the third expansion, which began Season of the Outlaw, retailers issued Destiny 2: Forsaken Legendary Collection, which included Destiny 2 and all DLC up to and including Forsaken as well as its Annual Pass. The Annual Pass was also made available upon the release of Forsaken, with its three content drops, Season of the Forge, Season of the Drifter, and Season of Opulence, releasing in December 2018, March 2019, and June 2019, respectively. In September 2019, the Annual Pass became free to all owners of Forsaken who had not purchased the pass.

Year Three then began with the fourth expansion, Shadowkeep, which released in October 2019 as a standalone expansion, not requiring players to purchase any of the previous expansions (future content, as well as Forsaken, were also viewed in this way). It featured four seasonal content offerings, which were available to purchase separately, unlike the seasons of the Annual Pass, and these introduced season passes for each season that had a free and premium track of rewards; purchase of the season passes were required to access each season's stories and activities. These seasons were Season of the Undying, which was released alongside Shadowkeep, followed by Season of Dawn, Season of the Worthy, and Season of Arrivals, releasing in December 2019, March 2020, and June 2020, respectively. Also alongside Shadowkeep was a re-release of Destiny 2 called New Light, which made the base game free-to-play, which included access to Curse of Osiris and Warmind, transitioning Destiny 2 to a live service game.

Year Four began with the fifth expansion, Beyond Light, released in November 2020 along with four seasonal content offerings, the first of which, Season of the Hunt, released alongside the expansion, followed by Season of the Chosen in February 2021, Season of the Splicer in May 2021, and then Season of the Lost in August 2021, which had a mid-season update, the Bungie 30th Anniversary Pack, in December 2021. Beyond Light's release had the largest effect on the game, as nearly half of the game's content was removed and placed into what Bungie called the Destiny Content Vault (DCV), which also included all content from the original Destiny. The content that was removed included Destiny 2's original base campaign, The Red War (which was replaced by a new-player quest), the Curse of Osiris and Warmind expansions, and the content of Year Two's Annual Pass, with the small exception of Gambit Prime from Season of the Drifter, which was slightly tweaked and replaced the three-round Gambit and renamed as Gambit. Following this, Bungie cycled some content in and out of the DCV, updating older areas as necessary.

Year Five began with the sixth expansion, The Witch Queen, which released in February 2022 along with four seasonal content offerings, the first of which, Season of the Risen, released alongside the expansion, followed by Season of the Haunted in May 2022, Season of Plunder in August 2022, and then Season of the Seraph in December 2022. With the release of The Witch Queen, The Tangled Shore destination and Forsaken's story campaign were rotated into the DCV, while the remaining endgame content from Forsaken, including access to its exotic gear, were repackaged as the Forsaken Pack. This content year also introduced "dungeon keys" as Years 5 though 7 had two dungeons released per year but these required a dungeon key to access them; dungeon keys were included with the deluxe editions of each expansion but could also be purchased separately.

Year Six began with the release of the seventh expansion, Lightfall, in February 2023. It launched along with four seasonal content offerings, the first of which, Season of Defiance, released alongside the expansion, which was followed by Season of the Deep in May 2023, Season of the Witch in August 2023, and Season of the Wish in November 2023, which had a mid-season update, Into the Light, in April 2024. Following this, expansion content remained in the game with only seasonal content being removed and placed into the DCV, with some minor exceptions (e.g., the Battleground activities from some seasons were retained and merged into the Vanguard Operations strike playlist).

Year Seven began with the release of the eighth expansion, The Final Shape in June 2024, which closed out the first saga of Destiny, called the "Light and Darkness" saga. Year Seven also changed the seasonal model and instead introduced larger "episodes", with three released during the year, which were standalone experiences that explored the aftermath of The Final Shape. They each were slightly longer than the previous seasons but instead were divided into three acts with a new act released every six weeks. The first, Episode: Echoes, released on June 11, 2024, one week after The Final Shape, with Episode: Revenant releasing on October 8, 2024, and then Episode: Heresy on February 4, 2025; Heresy concluded with a free event, Rite of the Nine, in May 2025, which acted as a prologue to Year Eight. Year Seven was the only year to utilize the episodic format. Also with Year Seven, the Shadowkeep and Beyond Light campaigns became free-to-play while their endgame content were repackaged as the Shadowkeep Pack and the Beyond Light Pack, respectively.

Year Eight, referred to as the "Year of Prophecy", once again changed the delivery model of content. It consisted of two large seasons that lasted several months with each season beginning with a medium-sized expansion and then receiving what Bungie called a "major update" midway through the season, rather than the previous year-long large expansions with multiple seasons/episodes. Year Eight's first season, Season: Reclamation, began with the ninth expansion, The Edge of Fate, in July 2025, with its major update, Ash & Iron, releasing in September 2025. Year Eight's second season, Season: Lawless, began with the game's 10th expansion, Renegades, in December 2025, with its major update, Monument of Triumph, releasing in June 2026; the latter was originally scheduled for March 2026 and to be titled Shadow & Order, but was delayed and renamed. Year Eight was originally intended to be the beginning of the next saga of Destiny called the "Fate" saga with at least two more expansions planned for Year Nine, but in May 2026, Bungie announced that it was ending support for Destiny 2 and that Monument of Triumph would be the game's final content update, but the game would remain online and playable. Alongside the game's final update in June 2026, all available expansions, content packs, and dungeon keys were bundled into a package called Destiny 2: The Collection. In September 2026, however, Bungie revealed its plans to re-add all previously removed content to lay the foundation for new stories and games.

== Overview ==
Prior to the release of Destiny 2 in September 2017, Bungie said that they had already begun work on post-release content. Bungie said they planned on providing post-release content at a quicker rate than that of the original Destiny, which was criticized for not having enough content post-launch and between each of its expansions' releases. Bungie also announced the Destiny 2 Expansion Pass prior to launch, which granted access to the first two minor expansions of the game, Curse of Osiris and Warmind. Throughout Year 1, Destiny 2 featured periodical holiday-themed events, in addition to the expansions. Year 2 featured one large expansion, Forsaken, the periodical events, and three premium content drops, available via the Annual Pass, which began Destiny 2's seasonal model.

Like the original game, whenever a new expansion released for Destiny 2, players were required to have purchased the preceding expansions in order to be able to play the newer one. Beginning with the Shadowkeep expansion in October 2019, which began Year 3, it and all future expansions and seasonal content (and including Forsaken) were considered standalone experiences, not requiring the player to have bought the preceding additional content. Additionally, seasons could now be purchased à la carte in the form of season passes. Alongside Shadowkeep, Bungie also made the base game of Destiny 2 free-to-play under a release titled New Light (which included access to Curse of Osiris and Warmind), which transitioned Destiny 2 to a live service game.

Year 4, which began with the Beyond Light expansion in November 2020, saw a major overhaul on the game with the introduction of the Destiny Content Vault (DCV), which included all content from the original Destiny. Upon this initial implementation of the DCV, Bungie removed the original Destiny 2's base campaign, "The Red War" (and replaced it with a new-player quest), as well as the Curse of Osiris and Warmind expansions, and the content of Year 2's Annual Pass (with the minor exception of Gambit Prime, which was truncated to "Gambit" and replaced the original as the standard version). Following this, Bungie cycled some content in and out of the game, updating older locations to fit the current state of the game. Furthermore, Bungie revealed three additional expansions, The Witch Queen, Lightfall, and The Final Shape. The first two were originally planned for release in fall 2021 and fall 2022, respectively, but were delayed to February 2022 and February 2023, respectively, due to the COVID-19 pandemic, with the third coming in June 2024, which concluded the first saga of Destiny, called the "Light and Darkness Saga". Due to the delay of The Witch Queen, a content pack called the Bungie 30th Anniversary Pack was released in December 2021, which included one new dungeon, a free-to-play six-player activity, as well as items inspired by Bungie's previous games. Upon launch of The Witch Queen (Year 5), portions of Forsaken were removed from the game, including the expansion's narrative campaign and The Tangled Shore destination and associated activities. Forsaken's endgame content, including the Dreaming City destination, remained and was rebranded under a content package called the Forsaken Pack. Beginning with Lightfall (Year 6), however, Bungie no longer vaulted expansion content; seasonal content (with some exceptions) was still vaulted with the release of each expansion. Also with The Final Shape (Year 7), the campaigns for Shadowkeep and Beyond Light became free-to-play while their endgame content was repackaged as the Shadowkeep Pack and Beyond Light Pack, respectively. Year 7 also replaced the four seasons with three longer episodes, which functioned very similarly to the seasons.

Year 8 began with the release of the ninth expansion, The Edge of Fate in July 2025, which also included the 10th expansion, Renegades, in December 2025. Year 8, referred to as the "Year of Prophecy", changed the seasonal model again, and for a final time, as the content year was divided into two large seasons that lasted several months, with each season beginning with one mid-sized expansion and then receiving what Bungie called a "Major Update" midway through the season, rather than the previous year-long large expansions with multiple seasons/episodes. Year 8 was originally intended to be the beginning the next saga of Destiny called the "Fate" saga, but on May 21, 2026, Bungie revealed that the June 2026 major update would be the final content update for Destiny 2. The decision to end Destiny 2 with this major update came as a result of parent company Sony taking a US$765 million impairment loss on Bungie from its previous fiscal year, on part due to poor performance of Marathon, with Bungie also refocusing their efforts to other games. Despite ending active development, Bungie confirmed that Destiny 2 would remain online and playable. Alongside the final update, all available expansions, content packs, and dungeon keys were bundled together as Destiny 2: The Collection.

In September 2026, Poria Torkan, Bungie's studio head, and Josh Deane, head of product at Bungie, gave a studio update, stating that they were planning to "return Destiny to its original promise" with major changes. This includes re-adding all previously removed content so that they can lay the foundation to create more Destiny stories and games. There was no time table given, as the executives noted that it would take time to rebuild all of the removed content.

== Year 1 Expansion Pass (2017–2018) ==
Like the original Destiny, an Expansion Pass was available alongside the release of Destiny 2, which granted access to the first two minor expansions of the game, Curse of Osiris and Warmind. While the expansions were available to purchase separately upon their respective releases, the Expansion Pass included the first two expansions at a discounted price versus buying them separately—the Expansion Pass was US$35 where the two expansions were US$20 each.

=== Curse of Osiris ===
Destiny 2 - Expansion I: Curse of Osiris
- Cover art featuring an image of Osiris above the portal to the Infinite Forest
- Developer: Bungie
- Publishers: Activision (2017–2019); Bungie (2019–2020)
- Platforms: PlayStation 4; Windows; Xbox One; Stadia
- Release: PlayStation 4, Windows, Xbox One; December 5, 2017; Stadia; November 19, 2019
- Genres: Action role-playing, first-person shooter
- Mode: Multiplayer

Destiny 2's first DLC pack, Curse of Osiris, was released on December 5, 2017. The expansion added new content and focused on the character Osiris from the lore of the original Destiny and for whom the Trials of Osiris PvP mode in the original was named (and later added to Destiny 2 in 2020). The expansion took players to the planet Mercury with its own patrol mode. Certain missions and strikes required players to progress through the Infinite Forest, an area that featured procedurally generated terrain and enemies, and which had been reused for the Halloween-themed event Festival of the Lost, rebranded as the Haunted Forest. Additionally, the EXP-level cap was raised to 25 and the Power level cap was raised to 330. In addition to the character Osiris, his Ghost named Sagira was added with a female voice, as well as the character Brother Vance from the original game, who was the non-player character (NPC) of Mercury in The Lighthouse (formerly an exclusive social space in Destiny for those who went flawless in Trials of Osiris). There was also a timed-exclusive Crucible map for PS4 players called Wormhaven. Instead of an entirely new raid, a new feature called raid lair was added, featuring new areas to the existing Leviathan raid and a different final boss.

==== Plot ====
In the aftermath of The Red War, Ikora Rey calls the Guardian to the Tower. She explains that her intelligence agents, the Hidden, have discovered a damaged Ghost on the remnants of Mercury. Ikora identifies the Ghost as Sagira, belonging to her former mentor and Vanguard predecessor, the legendary Warlock Osiris, who had been exiled from the City years before the first game, due to his obsession with the Vex. (Note: Detailed in the supplementary webcomic Fall of Osiris) Traveling to Mercury, the Guardian locates the gateway to the Infinite Forest, a simulated universe created by the Vex inside the planet's core, but is unable to enter. Brother Vance, the fanatical leader of the Cult of Osiris, (Note: Returning from House of Wolves) directs the Guardian to a hidden temple in the EDZ containing a modified Vex device that can restore Sagira. The device temporarily places Sagira's programming in the Guardian's Ghost, allowing them to access the gateway to the Forest.

Inside the Forest, the Guardian encounters numerous reflections of Osiris, copies of the Warlock created by himself to explore the Forest's different simulated realities. The reflections explain that in the past, Mercury had been a garden world shaped by the Traveler, before the Vex arrived and created the Forest in Mercury's core. The Guardian witnesses a simulated future scenario created by Panoptes, Infinite Mind, that controls the Infinite Forest, in which Light and Darkness no longer exist, all non-Vex life has been wiped out, and the Sun is darkened. Osiris' reflections claim that they have been unable to find a way to prevent the dark future, but believe that the Guardian may be the key to stopping it. Ikora directs the Guardian to the Pyramidion, a Vex construct on Io, which contains the location of a map that leads to Panoptes' lair in the Forrest. Following the Pyramidion's data back to the Forest and battling Red Legion simulations within, Sagira discovers that the map changes too quickly to find Panoptes. The Guardian travels to Nessus to obtain the core of a smaller Vex Mind to boost Sagira's processing power. Returning to the Forest's simulated past on a tip from Ikora, the Guardian combines the map data with Panoptes' algorithms from the moment of its creation, allowing Sagira to locate Panoptes' lair. At that moment, Panoptes itself arrives and forcibly separates Sagira from Ghost before ejecting the Guardian from the Forest and sealing the entrance.

Regrouping at the Tower, Ikora accompanies the Guardian back to Mercury, where she forces open the gateway to allow the Guardian to return to the Forest. Upon reaching Panoptes' lair, the Guardian fights through Panoptes' simulated legions, but is unable to damage the Vex Mind alone; Panoptes prepares to "delete" the Guardian from the Forest when Osiris himself arrives to aid the Guardian. Osiris is able to hold Panoptes at bay long enough for the Guardian to weaken and then destroy Panoptes, freeing Sagira and preventing the dark future from occurring. The Guardian and Osiris emerge from the gateway, where Ikora invites Osiris to return to the city. Osiris declines, and bids farewell to his former student and the Guardian before returning to the Infinite Forest.

Following the defeat of Panoptes, Emperor Calus extends another invitation to travel to the Leviathan on Nessus, where the fireteam of Guardians venture deep into the Leviathan's core to confront Argos, Planetary Core, the Vex Mind which was responsible for the transformation of Nessus, which the Leviathan started to consume until Argos forced the intake to stop ("Leviathan: Eater of Worlds" raid lair). After destroying Argos, the Guardians are nearly consumed by the Leviathan's fiery inferno, but are saved by Calus, who once again offers a place by his side and more than just the power of the Light.

The events of Destiny 2: Warmind follow.

==== Critical reception ====
Reception

Aggregate score
Aggregator	Score
Metacritic	(PC) 61/100 (PS4) 57/100 (XONE) 57/100

Review scores
Publication	Score
Destructoid	5/10
Game Informer	7.25/10
GameRevolution	5/10
GameSpot	5/10
GamesRadar+	2.5/5
Hardcore Gamer	2.5/5
IGN	5.5/10
Push Square	5/10

Curse of Osiris received "mixed or average" reviews, according to review aggregator Metacritic.

Destructoid called the token-based loot system a "major problem" while also lamenting the lack of leaderboards, sufficient loot rewards, engaging procedural exploration, and a quality sandbox, and went on to call Curse of Osiris one of the worst Destiny add-ons to date, alongside House of Wolves. Though Game Informer reviewed the title slightly more positively, they took issue with the shallow features, characters, and new locations, but noted that the several fun activities and loot chases available tempered frustration with the DLC. GameRevolution gave some praise to the additions made to the lore and the premise of the Infinite Forest, but criticized the title for being a paid update with a boring, short, and asset-recycling campaign. GameSpot felt that the Raid Lair was engaging and that new loot showed off quality gunplay, but took major issue with the fact that the campaign offered a half-baked story, tedious busywork, and reused content. GamesRadar+ praised the stunning visual design, new Forge weapons, and the addition of the Raid boss but thought that the campaign and Raid mode were underwhelming due to a lack of meaningful, long-term content additions. IGN gave the title a 5.5 out of 10 and wrote, "[Curse of Osiris'] campaign and story are a bust, its new content is mixed and buggy at best, and it does nothing to address the community's loud cries for fixes to the endgame. The few redeeming features are its more challenging and varied Adventures, and the Raid Lair's puzzles and tough boss battle." Push Square was frustrated with the game's squandered potential and Bungie's repetition of previously made mistakes, and stated, "For its asking price, there's no reason not to expect more from this first expansion. The story missions range from okay to insultingly dull, and the one truly interesting concept that Bungie introduces -- the Infinite Forest -- ends up being little more than a tedious shooting gallery."

=== Warmind ===
Destiny 2 - Expansion II: Warmind
- Cover art featuring an image of Ana Bray above the Mindlab facility of the Warmind Rasputin
- Developer: Bungie
- Publishers: Activision (2017–2019); Bungie (2019–2020)
- Platforms: PlayStation 4; Windows; Xbox One; Stadia
- Release: PlayStation 4, Windows, Xbox One; May 8, 2018; Stadia; November 19, 2019
- Genres: Action role-playing, first-person shooter
- Mode: Multiplayer

Warmind was released on May 8, 2018, and focused on the Warmind Rasputin from the original game. The expansion took players to the planet Mars in an area called Hellas Basin—the original Destiny had also featured the planet Mars, but in a different location on the planet. The expansion also featured a new mode called "Escalation Protocol", a horde mode which could be started by any player in the patrol mode on Mars. Players fought seven waves of Hive enemies, which culminated in a fight with one of five unique bosses that rotated weekly. A maximum of three players in a fireteam could participate in the mode, but other players in the patrol area could also join the activity. As well, the EXP level cap was raised to 30 and the Power level cap was raised to 380. In addition to Rasputin, a new character named Ana Bray (also from the lore of the original Destiny) was added, who served as the primary NPC on Mars. A timed-exclusive Strike called "The Insight Terminus" was also added for PS4 players. Like the previous expansion, Warmind also included a raid lair on the Leviathan. The expansion also added a progressive ranking system for PvP, titled Valor and Glory—this ranking system was not removed from the game when Beyond Light released in November 2020 but was later reworked into a competitive system. Valor was earned in quickplay matches while Glory was earned in competitive matches, with each new rank earning greater rewards—Valor points were earned regardless of win or loss, while Glory points were earned by wins but reduced by losses.

==== Plot ====
Several months after the events of Curse of Osiris, the Guardian sets out for Mars, the first place where Humanity encountered the Traveler, pursuing the remnants of the Red Legion as they scavenge across the Solar System in their retreat. As the Guardian's ship arrives, orbital weapon platforms known as Warsats begin falling out of orbit and smashing into the surface. The Guardian receives a distress call on the Vanguard's private comm channel from a Hunter named Ana Bray, warning that the Hive have broken out of the southern polar icecaps and are attacking the Clovis Bray Research Facility at Hellas Basin. The Guardian goes to the surface to assist Bray, who reveals that the central core of the ancient Warmind Rasputin, which controlled the Warsats, is inside the facility, and that the encounters with Rasputin in the Cosmodrome on Earth (as seen in the original Destiny) were actually fragments of his personality, cut off from the core and left behind following the Collapse. Reluctant to involve the Vanguard due to its policy of not pursuing past lives, Bray asks the Guardian to help her get inside Clovis Bray and protect Rasputin. From her ability to access the security systems, it is revealed that Bray had been a scientist at the facility, operated by her family, in her life before becoming a Guardian.

As the Guardian fights through hordes of Hive to reach Rasputin's central core, the Warmind activates a javelin-like weapon called the Valkyrie to assist the Guardian in battling through the elite Hive forces. As the Guardian and Bray enter Rasputin's core, however, they are confronted by Commander Zavala, who excoriates Bray for focusing on her past life in defiance of Vanguard law, instead of helping the Guardians fight against Ghaul on Earth. As the facility shakes, Zavala reveals that Rasputin was "not the only thing to awaken on Mars". A Hive worm god called Xol, Will of the Thousands, has also arisen, and is directing the frozen hordes of Hive around Clovis Bray to attack the facility and destroy Rasputin. Bray insists that Rasputin is the key to defeating Xol, but Zavala refuses, considering Rasputin to be too dangerous.

To bait Xol, Zavala sends the Guardian back to the EDZ on Earth, to investigate another shard of the Traveler broken off when it awakened at the end of the Red War. The Guardian finds the fragment in a Taken containment shield, and Bray is able to call upon Rasputin to retarget a Warsat in Earth orbit to fire on the fragment, disabling the shield. Returning to Mars with the fragment, the Guardian ventures into the Hive's caverns deep beneath Hellas Basin to locate Xol's feeding ground, where they encounter Nokris, Herald of Xol and the exiled younger son of Oryx, the Taken King (who was killed in The Taken King). After the Guardian defeats Nokris, they set down the fragment. Xol emerges, ignoring the fragment and burying the Guardian in the collapsing ice caves. Though the Guardian is able to crawl out of the rubble, Bray warns that Xol is heading directly for the Clovis Bray facility to destroy Rasputin, which would make the worm god all but unbeatable. Setting aside his reservations about the Warmind, Zavala reluctantly agrees to Bray's plan to use Rasputin in order to destroy Xol.

As the Guardian fights through Xol's hordes, Bray calls on the Guardian to overload Rasputin's core to channel more power into the Valkyrie. After disabling the cooling system and forcing a core meltdown, the Guardian emerges on an exterior platform to confront Xol. With Bray's help in stabilizing the power to generate Valkyrie javelins, the Guardian destroys Xol in a pitched battle. The Guardian then joins Bray and Zavala at Rasputin's central core. Speaking in Russian (with Bray as translator), the Warmind declares that while the Bray family sought to make him into an "all-seeing savior", and the Vanguard sought to wield him as a "primitive weapon", he would define his own existence from now on, and defend Humanity on his own terms. Rasputin then releases a new network of Warsats to the edges of the Solar System and beyond, to ensure that "never again will a threat go unseen".

Following Xol's defeat, the remnants of the Red Legion, led by Val Ca'uor, assault the Leviathan in an attempt to assassinate Emperor Calus and seize the ship. Calus once again calls upon Guardians to his aid ("Leviathan: Spire of Stars" raid lair). With aid from Calus's psychic powers and one of his android duplicates, the Guardians repel the Red Legion assault and defeat Ca'uor. Calus then congratulates the Guardians for their efforts and tells them he awaits the day they stand by his side when the end comes.

Although it was believed that Xol was destroyed, it is soon discovered after the defeat of Ca'uor that the worm god had in fact survived; the Guardian discovers an anomaly deep in the Grove of Ulan-Tan on Io, where Xol had been communing with the Taken there ever since being defeated by the Guardian ("The Whisper" exotic mission). The Guardian investigates the anomaly and eliminates the Taken there, including three former enemies who were resurrected and Taken by Xol—Ta'aurc, Aspect of War; Urzok, Aspect of Hate; and Drevis, Aspect of Darkness. After eliminating the Taken, the Guardian obtains an exotic heavy sniper rifle called the Whisper of the Worm, revealed to be Xol itself transformed into a weapon so it could feed off the Guardian's kills in combat.

The events of Destiny 2: Forsaken follow.

==== Reception ====
Reception

Aggregate score
Aggregator	Score
Metacritic	(PC) 68/100 (PS4) 63/100 (XONE) 61/100

Review scores
Publication	Score
Destructoid	5.5/10
Game Informer	7.75/10
GameRevolution	5/10
GameSpot	6/10
IGN	6/10
Push Square	5/10

Warmind received "mixed or average" reviews, according to review aggregator Metacritic.

Destructoid called the addition of the Escalation Protocol mode the "shining star of the DLC" and noted that the expansion marked the beginning towards making Destiny 2 a more complete experience, while writing, "Destiny 2: Warmind is a better effort than Osiris, but its limited scope and re-used concepts prevent it from attaining greatness." Game Informer was pleasantly surprised by the addition of substantial lore given Warmind's limited scope, and praised the Escalation Protocol mode, but noted that the lack of meaningful matchmaking kept it from reaching its full potential. GameRevolution similarly wrote that while Warmind was better than Curse of Osiris, the lack of good matchmaking and improvements to the core gameplay showed that Bungie was not listening to player feedback. GameSpot praised the addition of content catered towards hardcore players but disliked the rushed story, boring midgame activities, and repurposed story missions in the form of Strikes. IGN gave the game a 6 out of 10 and wrote, "[Warmind] leaves you with only a short campaign, old content to replay, and a handful of new PVP maps to try while you wait. Warmind feels like two steps forward, two steps back yet again for Bungie." Push Square thought that Warmind struggled to justify its price tag with its tired mission design and throwaway campaign feeling like a stopgap before the arrival of the next big expansion.

== Major expansions (2018–2025) ==
Like the original Destiny, Destiny 2 featured a major expansion released nearly annually. Originally, a major expansion released each fall, but this shifted to the beginning of the calendar year in 2022, and then mid-year in 2024. In 2025, Bungie shifted to releasing two expansions per year, roughly every six months, and while they were still major updates to the game, these expansions were smaller in size in comparison to prior years, with Bungie describing them as about the size as Rise of Iron from the original Destiny. These expansions typically had a major impact on the game, versus the minor content drops, such as the two small expansions of Year 1 and the seasonal content introduced in Year 2. Following the two minor expansions of the Expansion Pass (Curse of Osiris and Warmind), there were eight major expansions released for Destiny 2—Forsaken in September 2018, Shadowkeep in October 2019, Beyond Light in November 2020, The Witch Queen in February 2022, Lightfall in February 2023, The Final Shape in June 2024, The Edge of Fate in July 2025, and Renegades in December 2025. The year 2021 was the only year to not see a major expansion released due to The Witch Queen's delay, which was originally planned for November 2021. This also delayed Lightfall to February 2023, which was originally planned for fall 2022. Another expansion, The Final Shape, released in June 2024 and concluded Destiny 2's first major saga, the "Light and Darkness" saga. Each major expansion marked the beginning of a new content year in Destiny 2's lifecycle, and beginning in 2025, the summer expansion marked the beginning of a new content year, although 2025–2026 would ultimately be the final content year.

=== Year 2: Forsaken ===
The first major expansion of Destiny 2 but third overall, Forsaken was released on September 4, 2018, beginning Year 2 of Destiny 2. Similar to the original game's The Taken King expansion, Forsaken had a large overhaul on gameplay, though not to the extent that The Taken King had with the original Destiny. A large expansion, the story had a "western revenge" theme, taking place across the Reef's Tangled Shore and the Dreaming City. The expansion's story followed events after Cayde-6 was killed while trying to contain a prisoner outbreak at the Prison of Elders initiated by Uldren Sov, seeking his lost sister Queen Mara Sov. The Guardian sought justice on both Uldren and the Scorned Barons complicit in Cayde's death. A new enemy species, the Scorn, was introduced, which are undead Fallen raised by the power of dark ether under Uldren's and the Scorned Barons' control. A new raid, "The Last Wish", was introduced, as well as the games first dungeon named "The Shattered Throne", a three-player activity similar to a raid. Two other raids were added during Year 2: "Scourge of the Past" during Season of the Forge (Season 5) and "Crown of Sorrow" during Season of Opulence (Season 7). A new team-based competitive mode, Gambit, was introduced, where two teams of four players compete against each other, collecting motes from downed hostile enemies to try to fill a bank and summon a primeval Taken and kill it before the other team can. A player from the other team could also invade the opposing team's arena to slow their progress. There were player sandbox changes as well, with the edition of a new subclass tree for each already existing subclass, effectively adding six new supers abilities to the game, alongside a new weapon type, a bow and arrow.

With the release of The Witch Queen in February 2022, portions of Forsaken were removed from the game and placed in the Destiny Content Vault; this included the Forsaken campaign and the Tangled Shore destination and its associated activities, but not the Dreaming City or its endgame content. Ahead of this, Forsaken's campaign was made free-to-play on December 7, 2021, and a special Forsaken Pack, containing access to Forsaken's endgame content and exotics, was also released for players to purchase who did not already own Forsaken.

=== Year 3: Shadowkeep ===
On June 6, 2019, Bungie announced the next expansion, Shadowkeep, which was originally scheduled for September 17, 2019, but was delayed to October 1. The expansion is set on the Moon and is similar in scale to Forsaken. Shadowkeep follows the discovery of a strange pyramid-shaped ship deep within the Moon, eventually leading to a return to the Black Garden in the new raid "Garden of Salvation". The story soon tied to an approaching fleet of other pyramid ships belonging to the Darkness during the expansion's last season, Season of Arrivals (Season 11). Sandbox changes that came with this expansion included finishers and a new enemy archetype called Champions, which are stronger versions of some existing enemies that require mods from the newly added artifact system in order to stun and defeat them. Two new dungeons were added: "Pit of Heresy" at launch and "Prophecy" during Season of Arrivals. Shadowkeep did not have any dependencies on previous DLC. Its release coincided with a number of changes brought upon by Bungie breaking away from its publishing agreement with Activision, including the transition of the PC version from Battle.net to Steam, release for the Stadia cloud gaming platform, cross-save support between platforms, discontinuation of PlayStation-exclusive content, and release of a "foundational" version of Destiny 2 as a free-to-play title, under the name "New Light", which also included the first two expansions. With the release of The Final Shape in June 2024, Shadowkeep's campaign was made free-to-play while its endgame content was repackaged as the Shadowkeep Pack.

=== Year 4: Beyond Light ===
On June 9, 2020, Bungie announced the fifth expansion, Beyond Light, originally scheduled for September 22, 2020, but was delayed to November 10, due to the COVID-19 pandemic. The expansion is set on Jupiter's moon Europa and is similar in scale to the prior two expansions. As the Darkness takes over parts of the System, Eramis, Kell of the Fallen House of Salvation, discovers a way to wield the Darkness through Stasis, and seeks revenge against the Traveler for abandoning the Fallen. During the story, the Guardian is also gifted the power of Stasis by the Darkness and comes to accept it to fight back, leading to questions of the Darkness's true purpose in the system. The new raid released with this expansion was the "Deep Stone Crypt", tying in with the side story of the Clovis Bray and his granddaughters, Elsie and Ana Bray. As part of this narrative, Beyond Light removed Titan, Io, Mars, and Mercury worlds and activities, as they were taken over by the Darkness and no longer possible to locate. These locations were placed in the Destiny Content Vault as part of Bungie's goal to have better management of the game's content for future expansions, with the potential to later unvault these locations in a reworked fashion in future content updates. The expansion also brought back the Cosmodrome on Earth from the original game as a playable destination, which also served as the main location for the new player quest, as well as a revamped "Vault of Glass" raid from the first game later in the year during Season of the Splicer (Season 14), as well as a new dungeon, "Grasp of Avarice", which was added as part of the Bungie 30th Anniversary Pack, a mid-season update during Season of the Lost (Season 15). Similar to Shadowkeep, Beyond Light was a standalone expansion and did not require any dependencies on previous DLC. With the release of The Final Shape in June 2024, Beyond Light's campaign was made free-to-play while its endgame content was repackaged as the Beyond Light Pack.

=== Year 5: The Witch Queen ===
On August 24, 2021, Bungie announced the sixth expansion, The Witch Queen, which was originally intended for late 2021, but was delayed and released on February 22, 2022. The expansion is set in Savathûn's Throne World and revolves around Savathûn, the Witch Queen, who is the sister of Oryx, the Taken King, and is similar in scale to the previous three expansions. In this expansion, Savathûn has managed to harness Light to build an army of Hive Guardians with Ghosts of their own to fight against the Guardians of the Last City. The Guardian enters Savathûn's Throne World within the Ascendant Realm to fight back against her Lucent Brood. The expansion also introduced weapon crafting, a brand new first-person melee weapon, the glaive, as well as a Master-level difficulty of The Witch Queen campaign. Similar to Shadowkeep and Beyond Light, The Witch Queen is a standalone expansion and does not require any dependencies on previous DLC. The expansion not only featured a new raid, "Vow of the Disciple", but also featured a revamped "King's Fall" raid from the original game's The Taken King expansion, added during ''Season of Plunder (Season 18). Two new dungeons were also added: "Duality" during Season of the Haunted (Season 17) and "Spire of the Watcher" during Season of the Seraph (Season 19).

=== Year 6: Lightfall ===
On August 23, 2022, Bungie announced Lightfall, the seventh expansion that began Year 6 of Destiny 2's lifecycle, would be released on February 28, 2023; originally intended for late 2022 but was delayed as a result of The Witch Queen's delay. The expansion is set in a mysterious, technologically-advanced city of Neomuna, located on Neptune, and revolves around Emperor Calus, now a Disciple of the Witness, as he, the Witness, the Black Fleet, and their army of Shadow Legion Cabal and Pyramid Tormentors invade Neomuna enroute to the Traveler in the Last City. The Guardian meets the Cloud Striders, the alternate descendants of humanity and inhabitants of Neomuna, who help the Guardian discover the power of Strand, a new Darkness-based subclass based on psychic energy and movement, and are able to use a Strand grappling hook to traverse the Neomuna skyline. It added a new raid, "Root of Nightmares" as well as one legacy raid, "Crota's End" from the original game's The Dark Below expansion, later in the year during Season of the Witch (Season 22). Two new dungeons were also added: "Ghosts of the Deep" during Season of the Deep (Season 21) and "Warlord's Ruin" during Season of the Wish (Season 23).

=== Year 7: The Final Shape ===
Bungie had originally planned for Lightfall to cap off Destiny 2's first major saga, but after realizing that Lightfall was not enough, Bungie announced on August 22, 2023, that The Final Shape would be released on June 4, 2024 (delayed from its original release date of February 27, 2024) as the eighth expansion that would begin Year 7 of Destiny 2. The expansion takes place in a mysterious, otherworldly dimension known as the Pale Heart, located inside the Traveler, beyond the portal created by the Witness on the Traveler's surface at the end of Lightfall. The Guardian rallies the Vanguard and all of their allies, including Cayde-6 in spirit form, for the ultimate showdown against the Witness, who is using the Pale Heart to invoke the titular Final Shape, the calcification and destruction of all life in the universe. The expansion sees three new Light-based supers for each of the classes—"Song of Flame" for Dawnblade Warlocks, "Storm's Edge" for Arcstrider Hunters, and "Twilight Arsenal" for Sentinel Titans, as well as a new subclass, Prismatic, which allows Light and Darkness powers to be used in tandem. The Final Shape concludes the first major saga of Destiny 2, called the "Light and Darkness" saga, before the start of the next saga. It had one new raid, "Salvation's Edge", as well as the game's only 12-player activity called "Excision", which acts as the very final mission of the expansion, taking place after the raid. There were also two new dungeons released over the year: "Vesper's Host" during Episode: Revenant (Season 25) and "Sundered Doctrine" during Episode: Heresy (Season 26).

=== Year 8: "Year of Prophecy" ===
On May 6, 2025, Bungie announced that Year 8, referred to as the "Year of Prophecy", would have two mid-sized expansions, beginning with The Edge of Fate, on July 15, 2025, and then the Star Wars-inspired Renegades, on December 2, 2025. The Edge of Fate takes place on a mysterious planetoid called Kepler hidden within the Oort cloud at the edge of the Solar System, where it has been influenced by the Nine. The Guardian is invited by the Nine via their Emissary to visit Kepler for unknown reasons, and they explore the planetoid using the powers of dark matter. On Kepler, they learn that they must stop the collapse of a singularity which would destroy the entire system, while also learning of a prophecy of the Nine. Renegades takes place in the lawless frontier, comprising locations outside the Vanguard's jurisdiction on Mars, Venus, and Europa, and is inspired by Star Wars in collaboration with Lucasfilm. The Guardian works with the Drifter to stop Dredgen Bael from using a super weapon that would kill all lightbearers. Beginning with The Edge of Fate, the game saw a major overhaul in its user interface, such as a new Portal section for activities (which was reversed in the June 2026 update), as well as introducing a tiered system and set bonuses for both weapons and gear. Together titled the Year of Prophecy, both The Edge of Fate and Renegades were originally intended to begin Destiny 2's second saga, the "Fate" saga, focusing on the Nine, a pantheon of celestial, dark matter beings that took up residence in the celestial bodies of the Solar System long before the Traveler's arrival. The Edge of Fate introduced a new raid, the "Desert Perpetual", which took players to unknown space of the Nine, while Renegades introduced a new dungeon, "Equilibrium", set in the lawless frontier on Venus.

== Yearly ongoing content ==
While Year 1 of Destiny 2 featured two small expansions released over the course of the year, Year 2 introduced a seasonal model for the game, in which content was released periodically throughout the year, though these were minor content drops in comparison to the major expansions. There were four seasons for the year, and each season added new activities and new narrative content for the game, typically tying the previous expansion to the next. In addition to having names for each season (e.g., Season of the Forge), the seasons also had a numerical categorization. As Year 1 did not have seasons, its three releases were reworked under this numerical seasonal categorization: Destiny 2's original base campaign, "The Red War", is regarded as Season 1, with Curse of Osiris and Warmind being Seasons 2 and 3, respectively. Forsaken began Season 4, which was also known as Season of the Outlaw and covered the period from Forsaken's release until the release of Season of the Forge (September–December 2018). Beginning with Shadowkeep, the expansion's content and narrative occurred simultaneously with the year's first season (e.g., Season of the Undying was its own seasonal content that was released and occurred simultaneously with Shadowkeep; this was different from Season of the Outlaw, which was just the name for that period of time but was not its own separate content from Forsaken).

Year 3 also introduced season passes to the game, divided into a free track and premium track with rewards. The season passes were required to purchase in order to access the seasonal quests and activities. Years 4 through 6 continued Year 3's seasonal model with one exception. In Year 3, the seasonal content was immediately removed upon conclusion of each season, but in Years 4 through 6, the seasonal content remained in the game for the duration of that content year and were not removed until the beginning of the next year.

The seasonal model changed in Year 7, as instead of four traditional seasons, there were instead three larger "episodes" released after The Final Shape, with each episode containing three acts and each episode being treated as standalone experiences. These episodes explored the aftermath and fallout of the "Light and Darkness" saga. While the episodes began a new model of content delivery throughout the year, they still utilized the season passes that were introduced with Shadowkeep in Year 3 and continued the seasonal numerical categorization (e.g., Episode: Echoes was Season 24). Like with the previous seasons, the episodic content was removed upon the conclusion of Year 7.

Year 8 changed the delivery model again, and for a final time, as its content year was instead divided into two large seasons that lasted several months (which were Seasons 27 and 28), with each season beginning with one mid-sized expansion and then receiving what Bungie called a "Major Update" midway through the season. Year 8 continued to utilize season passes, which were renamed as reward passes, and each expansion and each major update received its own reward pass, but unlike the seasons and episodes in prior years, the narrative questlines and activities of the major updates were free for all players, although there was a premium track to their respective reward passes; the expansions still required purchasing. Year 9 was planned to follow this model, but was canceled due to Bungie ending support for Destiny 2 following Year 8's final major update in June 2026.

=== Seasons ===
==== Year 2 (2018–2019) ====
Year 2 featured an Annual Pass, which was released alongside the third expansion, Forsaken. It was available as a bundle with the expansion or could be purchased separately; however, players had to own Forsaken in order to acquire the Annual Pass. It included three premium downloadable content packages that were released over the course of Year 2, which were Season of the Forge (Season 5) in December 2018, Season of the Drifter (Season 6) in March 2019, and Season of Opulence (Season 7) in June 2019; the release period of Forsaken itself was alternatively known as Season of the Outlaw (Season 4). This was Bungie's initial seasonal content model, however, although there were three content packages, these could not be purchased separately and had to be purchased altogether in the Annual Pass. Content in these drops included new endgame challenges, new weapons, armor, and "vanity rewards" to collect, new and returning Exotics, new pinnacle activities, new triumph records to collect, and new lore to discover. All of the content of the Annual Pass became free to all owners of Forsaken on September 18, 2019, just prior to the release of the next expansion, Shadowkeep, which changed the way in which seasonal content was purchased and delivered. With the release of the Beyond Light expansion on November 10, 2020, the content of the Annual Pass was removed from the game and entered into the Destiny Content Vault (DCV), with the exception of Gambit Prime from Season of the Drifter, which was slightly reworked and became the standard Gambit format, replacing the three-round version originally introduced with Forsaken. Following this, some content that entered into the DCV were later remastered and reintroduced into Destiny 2.

==== Year 3 (2019–2020) ====
With the release of Shadowkeep, which began Year 3 of Destiny 2, Bungie changed the way in which seasonal content was delivered. Unlike the Annual Pass that was released alongside Forsaken, seasons could instead be purchased à la carte in the form of season passes. Also introduced were "seasonal ranks", which worked as battle passes. Seasonal ranks were divided into a free track and a premium track, with each track granting rewards at any given tier; there were 100 tiers of rewards, with the premium track receiving a reward for every tier and the free track receiving rewards for about half (players could continue to rank up beyond level 100 but there were no predetermined rewards except a bright engram every five levels). Regardless of content year, season pass holders had access to the rewards for both the free and premium tracks, as well as season-exclusive weapons and gear, materials, universal ornaments, and exotic quests. Only players who purchased the season passes had access to each season's exclusive seasonal activity. Also introduced was the seasonal artifact with season-specific mods for each season, although players could only unlock 12 of the 25 available mods (players could also reset their artifact to select different mods). Additionally, and also regardless of content year, leveling up the seasonal artifact gave bonus Power levels to players, which allowed them to go beyond the Power level cap of Pinnacle gear. Each season had a different seasonal artifact in relation to the seasonal narrative. Unlike the previous year (Year 2), the seasonal activities of Year 3 became unavailable at the conclusion of each season. There were four named seasons for Year 3: Season of the Undying (Season 8), which was available alongside Shadowkeep's release in October 2019, Season of Dawn (Season 9) in December 2019, Season of the Worthy (Season 10) in March 2020, and Season of Arrivals (Season 11) in June 2020. Players received the active season at time of their purchase of the standard version of Shadowkeep for the duration of Year 3 (e.g., if a player bought Shadowkeep during Season 10, they received that season for free).

==== Year 4 (2020–2022) ====
Year 4, which began with Beyond Light, continued Year 3's seasonal model, with a couple of exceptions. Each season's content remained in the game until the conclusion of Year 4, allowing players to experience each season for that year, regardless of when they began playing, much like the seasons of Year 2's Annual Pass, though the player had to still purchase the respective season passes to access the content. Some seasonal triumphs, however, could only be completed during the active season. Unlike Year 3, however, players did not receive the active season for free when they purchased the standard version of Beyond Light. The narrative across each season in Year 4 was also more interconnected instead of being cut into individual seasonal arcs like in previous years. Season 13 introduced weekly Seasonal Challenges that could be completed at anytime during the active season in Bungie's attempt to remove "FOMO" (fear of missing out) for players who were not able to login every week. Season 14 reduced the Power level increases for each non-expansion season to 10 (previously 50), meaning that players who had maxed out their gear in the prior season would only have to level up through pinnacle gear activities; this was in response to player complaints about the grind required at the start of each season. There were also four named seasons for Year 4: Season of the Hunt (Season 12), which was available alongside Beyond Light's release in November 2020, Season of the Chosen (Season 13) in February 2021, Season of the Splicer (Season 14) in May 2021, and then Season of the Lost (Season 15) in August 2021, which ran to February 2022, lasting over six months (26 weeks) due to the delay of The Witch Queen from November 2021 to February 2022. Due to this delay, the Bungie 30th Anniversary Pack was released in December 2021, adding two new activities and gear inspired by Bungie's previous games from the past 30 years. Upon the release of The Witch Queen, all of Year 4's seasonal content was removed from the game except for the Battlegrounds activity that was introduced in Season of the Chosen and the content of the Bungie 30th Anniversary Pack. Battlegrounds and strikes were merged into one singular playlist called the Vanguard Operations. Astral Alignment from Season of the Lost was later re-added as an arena activity in December 2025.

==== Year 5 (2022–2023) ====
Year 5, which began with The Witch Queen, continued Year 4's seasonal model. There were four seasons for Year 5: Season of the Risen (Season 16), which was available alongside The Witch Queen's release in February 2022, Season of the Haunted (Season 17) in May 2022, Season of Plunder (Season 18) in August 2022, and Season of the Seraph (Season 19) in December 2022, which ran until Lightfall's launch in February 2023. Unlike the previous two years, in which the season that was released alongside the expansion began its narrative the week after the expansion's launch, Season of the Risen's narrative began the same day as The Witch Queen. Additionally, beginning with Season 16, players could unlock all 25 mods from the seasonal artifact, although each mod beyond the 12th had an increase in experience cost to obtain. Season 17 introduced Triumph Seals for the Iron Banner PvP mode as well as the seasonal events. Season 19 removed planetary materials as a resource for upgrades and currency, and while the planetary materials could still be found on destinations, they were converted to glimmer when collected. Upon the release of Lightfall, all of Year 5's seasonal content was removed from the game except for the respective battlegrounds activities from Season of the Risen and Season of the Seraph, which were merged into the Vanguard Operations playlist, while the Expeditions from Season of Plunder were re-added as a fireteam ops activity in September 2025, and then Nightmare Containment from Season of the Haunted and Ketchcrash from Season of Plunder were re-added as arena activities in December 2025.

==== Year 6 (2023–2024) ====
Year 6, which began with Lightfall, continued Year 5's seasonal model. There were four seasons for Year 6: Season of Defiance (Season 20), which released alongside Lightfall in February 2023, Season of the Deep (Season 21) in May 2023, Season of the Witch (Season 22) in August 2023, and Season of the Wish (Season 23) in November 2023, which lasted nearly seven months (27 weeks) due to the delay of The Final Shape, which was pushed back from February to June 2024, which made Season of the Wish the longest traditional season in Destiny 2's history. Like with Shadowkeep, players received the active season's season pass at time of their purchase of the standard version of Lightfall for the duration of Year 6 (e.g., if the player bought Lightfall during Season 21, they received that season for free), and like with Year 2, all seasons could be purchased together in the Annual Pass (but they could also be purchased separately). Season 22 introduced a weekly exotic mission rotator, similar to the raids and dungeons rotator, and brought back previously vaulted exotic missions, but unlike the raids and dungeons, each returning exotic mission is only available during their respective week in the rotation. The mods on the seasonal artifact were also replaced with unique, unlockable perks, but only 12 could be active per character, and these perks were applied passively when active. During season 20, only 12 perks could be unlocked at a time, and to change to different perks, the player had to reset the artifact, which was free to do. Starting in Season 21, all perks on the seasonal artifact could be activated and deactivated individually instead of having to reset the entire artifact to change perks. Additionally, and unlike previous years, there were no Power level increases for each season after Season 20 for the duration of Year 6 (the hard Power level cap and Pinnacle cap remained at 1800 and 1810, respectively). Due to the delay of The Final Shape, a six-week long weekly quest called "Riven's Wishes" was added on January 30, 2024, followed by a free two-month long content update on April 9 called Into the Light, which served as a prelude for The Final Shape. Year 6 was also the final year to use the traditional seasonal model. Upon the release of The Final Shape, all of Year 6's seasonal content, as well as "Riven's Wishes" and Into the Light, were removed from the game, with the exception of the Onslaught activity from the latter, which was added as its own Vanguard playlist activity, while the Savathûn's Spire activity from Season of the Witch and The Coil activity from Season of the Wish were re-added as fireteam ops activities in July 2025.

=== Episodes ===
==== Year 7 (2024–2025) ====
Year 7, which began with The Final Shape, replaced the seasons with three larger episodes, which were divided into three acts, with each act lasting six weeks each. The episodes were originally scheduled for March, July, and November 2024, but due to The Final Shape's delay to June 4, 2024, these were pushed back. The first episode, Episode: Echoes (Season 24), began a week after the expansion's release on June 11 with Episode: Revenant (Season 25) in October 2024 and Episode: Heresy (Season 26) in February 2025. Although the episodes replaced the seasons, they still utilized the season passes for rewards and artifacts also continued to be used. Due to the episodes being longer than the previous seasons, the season passes were extended to 200 ranks of rewards, with the first 100 available in Act 1, the next 50 opening in Act 2, and the last 50 obtainable in Act 3. The way artifacts work remained the same from the prior year, but additional mods were also added, with the initial 25 mods available in Act 1, and then an additional 5 mods each becoming available in Acts 2 and 3, respectively. The episodes also expanded to 15 weeks of seasonal challenges instead of the previous 10 weeks. Bungie also reversed their decision from Year 6 to keep the Power level caps the same throughout the entire content year and opted to revert to the system used in Years 4 and 5 in which the Power cap went up by 10 for each episode. Narratively, the episodes were standalone experiences that explored the aftermath of The Final Shape. Purchase of the standard version of the expansion included access to the concurrent episode, while the other two episodes could be bought separately or all together in the Annual Pass. A free event, Rite of the Nine, was made available in May 2025 for the last two months of Act 3 of Heresy and acted as a prologue to Year 8. This was the only content year to utilize episodes as Year 8 instead had two medium-sized expansions with each receiving one major update. Upon the release of The Edge of Fate, all of Year 7's episodic content, as well as Rite of the Nine, were removed from the game, although the Contest of Elders activity from Episode: Revenant returned as a fireteam ops activity in September 2025.

=== Major updates ===
==== Year 8 (2025–2026) ====
Year 8, referred to as the Year of Prophecy, changed the content delivery model again, as the content year was divided into two large seasons that lasted several months, with each season beginning with one mid-sized expansion and then receiving what Bungie called a "Major Update" midway through the season. Year 8 began with The Edge of Fate in July 2025, which kicked off Season: Reclamation (Season 27), with its major update, Ash & Iron, releasing in September. Renegades in December began Season: Lawless (Season 28), with its major update, Monument of Triumph, releasing in June 2026; the latter was originally scheduled for March and was to be titled Shadow & Order, but due to major revisions, it was delayed and renamed. While each expansion required purchasing, the narrative content and activities of the major updates were free for all players. Season passes were still utilized but renamed as "reward passes", and each expansion and each major update had its own reward pass (with free and premium tracks), but unlike Year 7, all reward pass ranks could be unlocked from launch, with each having 110 ranks of rewards with the last 10 ranks requiring five times the experience points for each rank. Artifacts were also changed as they no longer granted bonus Power levels or mods and instead granted stat bonuses based on each piece of gear marked as "New Gear". Upon the launch of The Edge of Fate, players Power levels were also reset back to level 10 with a level cap of 200 for the year (equivalent to a legacy Power level of 2300). Bonus Power levels were instead gained from gear with Seasonal Bonus Power, which came from higher level activities after a player had reached level 200. The Seasonal Bonus Power level cap was 450 with The Edge of Fate and then 550 with Ash & Iron. Seasonal Bonus Power was originally to reset upon the launch of Renegades in December 2025, but Bungie reversed the decision and Seasonal Bonus Power carried over into Season: Lawless with 550 remaining the cap. In May 2026, Monument of Triumph was revealed to be the final content update for the game due to Bungie ending support for Destiny 2 following the major update's release in June.

Year 9 was planned to follow this same delivery model of content, with its two expansions announced as Shattered Cycle and The Alchemist. These were originally planned for summer and winter 2026, respectively; however, due to Year 8's Season: Lawless major update being delayed to June 2026, these were initially delayed but then ultimately canceled due to Bungie ending support for Destiny 2. Some content intended for these expansions was included in the game's final update, Monument of Triumph, in June 2026.

In a studio update in September 2026, Bungie revealed their plans to unvault all content that had been placed in the DCV, including the worlds, strikes, and raids, saying this was the "first step to lay the foundation for how we reforge into new stories and games that you all deserve". There was no time table given, as the studio said it would take time to rebuild all of the removed content.

== Bungie 30th Anniversary Pack ==
Due to the delay of The Witch Queen from November 2021 to February 2022, Bungie released the Bungie 30th Anniversary Pack on December 7, 2021, as a mid-season update for Season 15, Season of the Lost. The content package was part of a 30th-anniversary event for the developer. The paid pack includes access to a pirate-themed dungeon called Grasp of Avarice, which takes place on Earth's Cosmodrome within the infamous "loot cave" from the original Destiny, as well as an exotic quest to obtain the rocket launcher Gjallarhorn, a returning exotic from the original Destiny which was updated with an exotic catalyst. Through the dungeon, players discover that a previous team of Guardians, led by Wilhelm-7, were lured to the infamous loot cave by Fallen due to a promise of riches, which resulted in a descent into madness for Wilhelm and the deaths of his fireteam, and ultimately, himself.

Bungie also added free content alongside the 30th Anniversary Pack, available to all players, although some reward chests require ownership of the paid content package. The free content includes a six-player PvE activity called Dares of Eternity, which takes the form of a game show hosted by exotic items merchant Xûr. The activity has players battling through two waves of random enemies, determined by the spin of a wheel, followed by a boss fight with one of three bosses; the players who correctly guess the final boss receive infinite heavy ammo for the boss fight. A bonus round after the boss fight may also occur at random. Players can visit Xûr and the mythical Starhorse in Xûr's Treasure Hoard to collect bounties for the Dares of Eternity activity, as well as open chests with special currencies from the activity. Other chests, based on the player's reputation rank with Xûr, require ownership of the 30th Anniversary Pack. Rewards from the activity include weapons and armor inspired by Bungie's previous games—Marathon, Myth, and Halo—as well as an exotic quest for the sidearm Forerunner, based on the M6 magnums from Halo.

Although released during a season, the Bungie 30th Anniversary Pack was exempt from the content vaulting of seasonal content that occurred with the release of each major expansion. Furthermore, Bungie used Dares of Eternity as a source to obtain some gear from previously vaulted seasons.

== Into the Light ==
Due to the delay of The Final Shape from February to June 2024, Bungie released Into the Light on April 9, 2024, as a mid-season update for Season 23, Season of the Wish. The two-month long content pack was free to all players and served as a prologue to The Final Shape. The content featured Guardians teaming up with Lord Shaxx and his Redjacks as the Black Fleet and the forces of the Witness attacked the Last City to prevent the Guardian and the Vanguard from entering the portal on the Traveler's surface. Into the Light featured a new tower defense horde mode called "Onslaught", where a three-player fireteam defended sectors of the Last City from the forces of the Witness. In Onslaught, players defended a device called the Active Defense Unit (ADU) against up to 50 waves of enemies, with every 10th wave featuring a boss inside a Pyramid ship. In between waves, players could use a new currency called Scrap (obtained by defeating enemies during each wave) to build up defenses such as tripwires, turrets, and decoys, as well as finding batteries to repair the ADU. The matchmade playlist version of Onslaught only featured 10 waves of enemies, while the higher non-matchmade difficulties featured the full 50 waves.

The update also featured 12 reissued weapons—branded as BRAVE weapons—from earlier seasons and expansions and from the original Destiny which had a chance to drop with extra perks and an exclusive ornament, as well as a brand new social space in the Tower called the Hall of Champions, where players could increase the drop rates for any of the 12 reissued weapons, as well as earn new rewards. Three new Crucible maps—Eventide Labs on Europa, Cirrus Plaza on Neomuna, and Dissonance in the Witness's Pyramid mothership—were also released in May 2024 as part of the update. A limited-time boss rush PvE endgame mode called "Pantheon" was released on April 30, 2024, which featured battles with raid bosses with increasing difficulty and rewards. The Whisper and Zero Hour exotic missions also returned as part of the update.

Unlike the 30th Anniversary Pack, which was exempt from the content vaulting that occurred with seasonal content upon the release of each major expansion, some of the Into the Light content was removed from the game when The Final Shape released. Into the Light content that remained in the game after The Final Shape included the Onslaught activity, which received its own dedicated playlist under Vanguard Operations, the BRAVE weapons, the exotic missions, the PvP maps, as well as the Parade armor set and shaders.

== Rite of the Nine ==
On May 6. 2025, Bungie released Rite of the Nine as a mid-season update for Act 3 of Episode: Heresy, and was inspired by the Pantheon boss rush endgame mode from Into the Light. The two-month long content pack was free to all players and served a prologue to The Edge of Fate as well as what was planned to be the next saga of Destiny 2, the "Fate Saga". The content featured the Nine through their Emissary inviting Guardians to partake in their challenge of strength in combat and exploration by revisiting three dungeons that were released during the Light and Darkness Saga—"Prophecy" from Season of Arrivals (Season 11), "Spire of the Watcher" from Season of the Seraph (Season 19), and "Ghosts of the Deep" from Season of the Deep (Season 21). All three dungeons had three difficulty modes—Explorer, which served as a tutorial for new players and each encounter was explained through tooltips with matchmaking enabled and also disabled darkness zones, preventing a reset of an encounter if the whole fireteam died, and also locked players out of higher tier rewards; Eternity, which was the standard dungeon experience with tougher enemies; and Ultimatum, which featured the Contest Mode difficulty and could drop both Adept and holofoil weapons based on players' death counts in each encounter. Each dungeon rotated bi-weekly for the first six weeks of the event until June 17, 2025, in which all three dungeons became available with one dungeon each week having increased rewards.

The Adept and holofoil variants for each of the dungeon's weapons had updated perk pools and had a chance to drop with extra perks. The update also featured the return of the Third Spire social space from Year 1's Trials of the Nine, where players could increase the drop rates for any of the 12 reissued dungeon weapons, as well as earn new rewards. Players could also spend a new currency, Nonary Manifolds, to purchase Adept and holofoil weapons and Nonary Engrams from the Emissary, the latter of which rewarded limited-time cosmetics from past seasons and expansions. Upon the release of The Edge of Fate, Rite of the Nine was removed from the game, with the dungeons reverting to their pre-event difficulties and rewards.

A limited time PvP mode, "Heavy Metal", featuring 3v3 battles between Fallen Brigs and Drake Tanks, was also available as part of the update and released on May 9, lasting only one week, ending on May 16. Heavy Metal featured a new reward hub called the Event Home, which replaced the premium Event Cards from seasonal events; the Event Home featured daily and weekly challenges to complete for the event, as well as a free reward track that progressed when completing daily and weekly challenges. This later returned as a periodic event.

== Limited-time events ==
Like the original Destiny, Destiny 2 featured a number of limited-time events throughout each year. With the introduction of the seasonal model in Year 2, there was at least one main limited-time event each season. With the change to episodes in Year 7 and then major updates in Year 8, the disbursements of events was uneven for each update, but the four main events occurred at roughly the same time each year. Beginning with the second Dawning event (December 2018 – January 2019), NPC Eva Levante served as the main vendor for the majority of these events. Additionally, and with the exception of the Faction Rallies, the Tower social space was redecorated for these events—the Farm social space also saw a redecoration during The Dawning event, but that social space was removed and entered into the Destiny Content Vault in November 2020 (although it was briefly unvaulted in Season of Defiance in Year 6). During Season of the Haunted in Year 5, Bungie introduced Triumph Seals for the four main seasonal events (Guardian Games, Solstice, Festival of the Lost, and The Dawning), which could be gilded, as well as one overall Triumph Seal for completing activities from all four events. As a result of Bungie ending support for Destiny 2 following the June 2026 update, limited-time events were retired but rewards from these events can be obtained through the Monument of Triumph vendor.

=== Faction Rally ===
Faction Rallies were a periodical one-week event for Destiny 2. The event let players pledge their allegiance to one of three factions: Dead Orbit, Future War Cult, or New Monarchy—these factions were in the original Destiny with faction vendors that could be accessed at anytime. The faction vendors from the original Destiny also returned to reprise their roles: Arach Jalaal of Dead Orbit, Lakshmi-2 of Future War Cult, and Executor Hideo of New Monarchy. After pledging allegiance to a faction, players completed various activities to earn experience points, which would in turn reward faction tokens to unlock special packages from the pledged faction. The faction with the most points by the end of the week earned a discount on a powerful weapon from the faction while players who had pledged to a losing faction could still purchase the weapon but for a much higher price (players of the winning faction could purchase the weapon for 1,000 Glimmer whereas players of the losing factions had to pay 50,000 Glimmer).

A total of eight Faction Rallies occurred throughout Year 1 of the game but were removed in Year 2. The first two Faction Rallies occurred during Season 1 and were held from September 26 to October 2, 2017, and then from November 7 to 13. The next three occurred during Season 2 and were held from January 16 to 22, 2018, then February 20 to 26, and then from March 20 to 26. The last three were during Season 3 and were held from June 5 to 11, from June 26 to July 3, and then finally from July 17 to 24. In August 2018, Bungie announced that the event would go on hiatus for season 4 of the game. However, it remained in hiatus until February 2020 when game director Luke Smith confirmed that there were no plans to bring back Faction Rallies. Furthermore, at the conclusion of Season of the Splicer in August 2021, Lakshmi-2 was killed in battle and the three factions left Earth.

=== The Dawning ===
The Dawning was an annual holiday-themed event that typically ran from December to January. It was originally introduced during Year 3 of the original Destiny and returned for Destiny 2. Beginning with Year 2's event, the main activity for players was to bake cookies with various ingredients earned from defeated enemies and deliver these cookies to the various NPCs throughout the different destinations in the game. Through quests, baking various numbers of cookies granted event-related rewards.

The first Dawning event for Destiny 2 was held during Season 2, lasting from December 19, 2017, until January 9, 2018. Players could create snowballs in the social spaces, as well as during strikes and throw these at other players or enemies (which damaged enemies). The Crucible game mode "Mayhem" (all abilities restored rapidly) was also brought back from the original Destiny. New Milestones with event-themed rewards were also added, and players could send gifts to friends that contained random items.

The following year, The Dawning was held from December 11, 2018, to January 1, 2019, during Year 2's Season of the Forge (Season 5) and saw the return of Eva Levante, an NPC from the original game who served as the main vendor for the event. This year's event introduced the cookie baking activity. Completing this year's event's quests granted rewards, such as the legendary machine gun Avalanche and an exotic sparrow called Dawning. The next Dawning event occurred during Year 3's Season of Dawn (Season 9) and was held from December 17, 2019, to January 5, 2020. Quest rewards included the exotic sparrow Alpine Dash and the legendary submachine gun Cold Front. The fourth Dawning event occurred during Year 4's Season of the Hunt (Season 12) from December 15, 2020, to January 5, 2021. Through the event's quests, players could earn the Spiritfarer 7M exotic ship with different cosmetic upgrades, as well as the legendary fusion rifle Glacioclasm. Due to The Witch Queen expansion being delayed to February 2022, the fifth Dawning event also took place in Year 4 and during its final season, Season of the Lost (Season 15), from December 14, 2021, to January 4, 2022. The event returned in Year 5 during Season of the Seraph (Season 19) from December 13, 2022, to January 3, 2023. An Event Card was added for the 2022 event, featuring event-specific challenges and could be upgraded via Silver to unlock exclusive rewards, as well as new cosmetics, an event Triumph Seal that could be gilded, and the new legendary Stasis pulse rifle Stay Frosty. The seventh Dawning event took place in Year 6 during Season of the Wish (Season 23) from December 12, 2023, to January 2, 2024; this edition featured an exclusive Memento which could be used in weapon crafting and the new legendary Arc glaive Albedo Wing. Year 7's event occurred from December 10 to December 31, 2024, during Episode: Revenant (Season 25) while the final Dawning event occurred in Year 8 from December 16, 2025, to January 6, 2026, during the first half of Season: Lawless (Season 28).

=== Crimson Days ===
Crimson Days was a Valentine's Day-themed event and was also first introduced in the original Destiny during its Year 2, but did not return in Year 3 of that game; however, the event was brought back during Year 1 of Destiny 2. Just as in the original event, Crimson Days was a one-week event that featured a 2-versus-2 Crucible mode—the only in Destiny 2—however, the mode was modified from the original. Staying close to a teammate caused all abilities to recharge quicker, while being apart gave away both players' locations to the opposing team. Players could also earn Crimson Engrams, granting new rewards. Crucible vendor Lord Shaxx was the NPC for this event.

The first Crimson Days event for Destiny 2 was held during Season 2 and began on February 13 and ran through February 20, 2018. The event returned the following year during Year 2's Season of the Forge (Season 5), running from February 12 to 19, 2019. The third event was held from February 11 to 18, 2020, during Year 3's Season of Dawn (Season 9). The event was discontinued in 2021, with Bungie citing that the event had not been up to their standards in recent years and they decided to place it into the Destiny Content Vault.

=== Solstice (of Heroes) ===
Solstice (called Solstice of Heroes until 2022) was an annual summer event that typically ran from July to August. Players were given an armor set and throughout the event, upgraded it to become a viable armor set for players to use beyond the event. This event's featured activity during Years 2 to 4 was the European Aerial Zone (EAZ). In this activity, a team of three players had a set time to battle Hive, Cabal, or Fallen foes and hunt mini-bosses throughout the space, with a final boss appearing after the time had expired. Several hidden chests also appeared throughout the space after defeating the final boss. Year 5 introduced a new activity called Bonfire Bash to replace the EAZ activity although the event took place in the same EAZ location. A team of three players had a set time to face Taken enemies, as well as Hive, Cabal, or Fallen enemies to obtain igniters to light up a large bonfire at the center of the EAZ map, with a final boss appearing after time had expired. Completing this activity, as well as other activities, were required to upgrade the event's armor set.

The first Solstice of Heroes event was held during Season 3 from July 31 to August 28, 2018, to commemorate the first year of the game. The Power level cap was raised to 400 for the event. A new NPC called the Statue of Heroes was added and provided bounties that, when turned in, awarded Moments of Triumph points for players which could be used to earn exclusive rewards. Players received "Scorched" armor pieces at Power level 240 at the start of the event, which could then be upgraded to "Rekindled" armor at Power level 340, then to "Resplendent" armor at Power level 400, all by completing specific requirements for each armor piece, including playing through five revamped (Redux) missions from the original Destiny 2 campaign. Players could also earn Solstice Engrams, which also granted new rewards.

The event returned from July 30 to August 27, 2019, during Year 2's Season of Opulence (Season 7) with Eva Levante as the main vendor for the event. There was no Power level increase for this year (or future events), with the Power levels instead coinciding with the concurrent Power levels of the active season. The European Aerial Zone activity replaced the Redux missions as the event's main activity. Similar to the previous year, players also upgraded their armor, from Drained to Renewed to Majestic. The third event occurred during Year 3's Season of Arrivals (Seaaon 11) and was held from August 11 to September 8, 2020, while the fourth event occurred during Year 4's Season of the Splicer (Season 14) and ran from July 6 to August 3, 2021. For both years, after players upgraded their armor—from Renewed to Majestic to Magnificent—they could complete more difficult challenges to earn a universal ornament to add a glow to any armor set. While the names of the armor sets remained the same for the third and fourth events, the physical appearances of the armor changed.

The event received a major overhaul when it returned from July 19 to August 9, 2022, during Year 5's Season of the Haunted (Season 17), which included shortening the event's name to Solstice. Alongside the new Bonfire Bash activity, an Event Card that featured event-specific challenges, as well as brand new cosmetics, was also made available, as well as an event Triumph Seal that could be gilded. The Event Card could be upgraded via Silver to unlock exclusive rewards. Completing challenges on the Event Card rewarded Kindling, which was used to give each piece of armor a glow, while Silver Leaves were collected from any activity (while wearing at least one piece of event armor) and these Leaves were transformed into Silver Ash in the Bonfire Bash event. The Silver Ash was then used to upgrade the event's armor set and re-roll each armor piece's stat distribution. The armor for Year 5's event was the Candescent armor set. The event returned from July 18 to August 8, 2023, during Year 6's Season of the Deep (Season 21), with a new Sunlit armor set to upgrade.

The event received another update for its return from August 6 to August 27, 2024, during Year 7's Episode: Echoes (Season 24) The event added a Solstice Forge, accessed via Eva Levante, and within the forge, players used Silver Leaves to purchase bounties. The bounties rewarded alloys and after earning enough alloys, a quest could be done for each piece of Sublime armor, which required playing the EAZ activity. Collecting more alloys allowed the purchase of another quest for each piece of armor to add a glow to the armor. The final Solstice event occurred in Year 8 from August 5 to August 19, 2025, during the first half of Season: Reclamation (Season 27).

=== Festival of the Lost ===
Festival of the Lost was a Halloween-themed event that was also first introduced in the original Destiny during Year 2 of that game, but it did not return until Destiny 2's Year 2. Like in the original Destiny, there were decorative masks for the players to wear, depicting one of the various characters in the game. Players were required to wear one of these masks to earn the event's currency, candy.

For the events from 2018 to 2020, the main activity was the Haunted Forest, which took place in a darkened version of the Infinite Forest on Mercury. Players would clear as many sections of the forest as they could within a limited time, while also facing bosses. Once the overall time ran out, players were awarded with various rewards. Due to Mercury being placed in the Destiny Content Vault with the release of Beyond Light, the Haunted Forest also entered the vault. In 2021, a new activity was introduced for the event called Haunted Sectors, which were event-themed versions of the Lost Sectors activity located on the various destinations in the game. A new lore book called the Book of the Forgotten was added to be completed during the event and required Manifested Pages to unlock the lore entries. In addition to candy for other event items, players collected Spectral Pages through any activity in the game, and these were converted into Manifested Pages by defeating the minibosses called Headless Ones in the Haunted Sectors. Completing a Haunted Sector itself awarded other various rewards. In 2022, an Event Card was added for Festival of the Lost, which featured event-specific challenges and could be upgraded via Silver to unlock exclusive rewards, as well as new cosmetics and an event Triumph Seal which could be gilded. The Haunted Sectors activity returned with a brand new Haunted Sector in the EDZ, as well as a new volume of the Book of the Forgotten. The 2023 edition featured Legend Haunted Sectors, more difficult versions of Haunted Sectors which featured Champion enemies and additional modifiers, Eerie Engrams, which dropped from completing Haunted Sectors and Legend Haunted Sectors and could be used to focus exotic gear, an exclusive Memento for use in weapon crafting which could drop from Eerie Engrams, as well as a new volume of the Book of the Forgotten.

Upon its return in Year 2 of Destiny 2, Festival of the Lost ran from October 16 to November 6, 2018, during Season of the Outlaw (Season 4), culminating in a three-week murder mystery quest that rewarded players with a returning Destiny exotic, the machine gun Thunderlord. Due to the delay of 2020's Beyond Light expansion (originally scheduled for September but delayed to November), Festival of the Lost occurred twice during Year 3. First was from October 29 to November 19, 2019, during Season of the Undying (Season 8), then again from October 6 to November 3, 2020, during Season of Arrivals (Season 11). Festival of the Lost in Year 4 began on October 12 and ran to November 2, 2021, during Season of the Lost (Season 15). The event in Year 5 ran from October 18 to November 8, 2022, during Season of Plunder (Season 18). The event in Year 6 ran from October 17 to November 7, 2023, during Season of the Witch (Season 22). The event in Year 7 ran from October 29 to November 12, 2024, during Episode: Revenant (Season 25). The final Festival of the Lost event occurred in Year 8 from October 21 to November 11, 2025, during the second half of Season: Reclamation (Season 27).

=== The Revelry ===
The Revelry was a spring- and Easter-themed event that occurred during Year 2's Season of the Drifter (Season 6) and ran from April 16 to May 6, 2019, with Eva Levante as the vendor for the event. In this event, an activity called the Verdant Forest was featured, and was similar to Festival of the Lost's Haunted Forest, but in the theme of the spring season. Unlike the Haunted Forest, where players battled bosses after clearing sections of the forest, players instead traveled back and forth through the Verdant Forest indefinitely. Players started the mode with four minutes on the clock and gained additional time for every enemy killed. Players continued through the forest, also battling bosses, until they ran out of time. Through the event, players could earn the exotic linear fusion rifle Arbalest, as well as a legendary armor set. The Revelry was replaced by Guardian Games in 2020.

=== Moments of Triumph ===
Similar to the original Destiny, Destiny 2 featured a yearly "Moments of Triumph" event, rewarding players for their various achievements from throughout the previous year, while also allowing players to complete certain triumphs before the year's end, along with new rewards. Additionally, players could unlock the ability to purchase exclusive event-related items from Bungie's website. The first Moments of Triumph in Destiny 2 occurred from July 31 to August 28, 2018, after during Season 3. It returned during Year 2's Season of Opulence (Season 7) and occurred from July 9 to August 27, 2019. The Year 3 event occurred during Season of Arrivals (Season 11) and began on July 7 and was originally to conclude on September 22, but due to the delay of the Beyond Light expansion, the event was extended until November 10. The Year 4 event then occurred during Season of the Lost (Season 15) as part of Bungie's 30th anniversary event; it began on December 7, 2021, and concluded on February 21, 2022. The Year 5 event occurred for the entirety of Season of the Seraph (Season 19), which began on December 6, 2022, and ran until the release of the Lightfall expansion on February 28, 2023. The Year 6 event occurred during the second half of Season of the Wish (Season 23), which began on February 27 and ran until the release of The Final Shape expansion on June 4, 2024. The Year 7 event occurred at the end of Act 1 of Episode: Heresy (Season 26), which began on March 4 and ended on May 6, 2025. The final event was tied into the game's final update on June 9, 2026, titled Monument of Triumph, occurring during the second half of Season: Lawless (Season 28).

=== Guardian Games ===
Guardian Games was an annual spring event that replaced The Revelry; the inaugural event was in honor of the 2020 Summer Olympics in Tokyo, Japan. During this event, the classes of players—Hunters, Titans, and Warlocks—competed against each other to earn points. The class with the most points by the end of the event won, with a commemorative statue displayed in the Tower for the next year—the statue featured each class' animal representative (snake for Hunters, lion for Titans, and eagle for Warlocks), and the winning class's animal was displayed in gold. To participate, players had to equip a special event-specific class item, given to players upon starting the event. Over the seven years of Guardian Games, Titans won the most with three wins (2020, 2023, and 2025), with Hunters (2021 and 2024) and Warlocks (2022 and 2026) tied at two wins.

In the first event, which ran from April 21 to May 11, 2020, during Year 3's Season of the Worthy (Season 10), players picked up bounties and quests from Eva Levante, and upon completing these, earned bronze, silver, or gold tokens. These tokens were turned into a new kiosk, the Guardian Games Podium, in the center of the Tower, with gold tokens giving the most points. Players could also obtain the exotic machine gun Heir Apparent, an event-exclusive reward. Titans won the inaugural Guardian Games.

The event returned during Year 4's Season of the Chosen (Season 13) and began on April 20 and concluded on May 10, 2021. Tokens were renamed as medals. In addition to bounties to gain XP and collect additional Laurels, players completed contender cards for Strikes, Crucible, or Gambit, each having random objectives in the activity to grant additional progress to complete the card, which rewarded gold medals; bronze medals were rewarded from completing any of the three core activities while silver medals were rewarded from completing Nightfalls. Additionally, platinum medals were added, which granted the most points, and were obtained through platinum cards for either Trials of Osiris or Nightfall: The Ordeal. A limited number of medals were also available from completing the event's triumphs. The Heir Apparent exotic machine gun also returned as an event reward and its exotic catalyst was added as an additional reward. Hunters won the 2021 Guardian Games.

The event returned during Year 5's Season of the Risen (Season 16) and ran from May 3 to May 24, 2022. New contender cards were added for Throne World destination activities and seasonal activities, which also earned gold medals, while new platinum cards for Throne World destination activities, season activities, and Lost Sectors were also added. Similar to the previous year's event, a limited number of medals were also available for completing the event's triumphs. Strike scoring from the original Destiny returned as part of two event-exclusive strike playlists, Recreational and Training/Competitive. The Recreational strike playlist worked similar to the regular Vanguard Ops playlist and was made available throughout the duration of the event. The Training playlist was only available from Tuesday to Thursday and the Competitive playlist was only available from Friday to Monday. By scoring in these playlists, players earned buffs that would last until the weekly reset, and could be used to light torches around the Guardian Games Podium in the Tower, which granted further rewards. The Heir Apparent exotic machine gun and its catalyst also returned as an event-exclusive reward, and a brand new event-exclusive legendary Void submachine gun, The Title, was also made available as a reward. Warlocks won the 2022 Guardian Games.

Guardian Games returned during Year 6's Season of Defiance (Season 20) and ran from May 2 to May 22, 2023. An Event Card was added for the 2023 event, featuring event-specific challenges and could be upgraded via Silver to unlock exclusive rewards, as well as new cosmetics and an event Triumph Seal that could be gilded. The event currency, Laurels, were removed for this edition of the Guardian Games, with contender cards now being able to be purchased using Glimmer. The Supremacy PvP game mode returned as part of this year's event, while strike scoring and the Recreational and Competitive strike playlists also returned; the strike playlists as well as Supremacy had the option for class-based matchmaking. Similar to the 2022 event, scoring in both Supremacy and the Competitive strike playlists granted players buffs that would last until the weekly reset, and could be used to light torches around the Guardian Games Podium in the Tower, granting additional rewards. The Heir Apparent exotic machine gun and its catalyst as well as The Title legendary submachine gun returned as event-exclusive rewards, while a brand new event-exclusive legendary Strand scout rifle, Taraxippos, was also made available as a reward. Titans won the 2023 Guardian Games.

Due to the delay of The Final Shape, the event was held a second time in Year 6, occurring during the second half of Season of the Wish (Season 23), running from March 5 to March 26, 2024. Diamond medals were added as part of this edition, where only three could be obtained per week via contender cards for PvP and PvE endgame activities, as well as watching a Destiny 2 stream for at least two hours on the streaming platform Twitch. Like previous years' events, obtaining high scores in Nightfalls, the Competitive strike playlist, as well as in both Supremacy and Gambit granted players buffs that lasted until the weekly reset, and could be used to light torches around the Guardian Games Podium in the Tower, granting additional rewards. Options for class-based matchmaking continued to be available for the strike playlists, Supremacy, and Gambit. Focus activities rotating between Nightfalls, Supremacy, and Gambit were also available for the duration of the event; completing these focus activities earned additional rewards. The Heir Apparent exotic machine gun and its catalyst as well as The Title legendary submachine gun and the Taraxippos legendary scout rifle returned as event-exclusive rewards, while a brand new event-exclusive legendary heavy grenade launcher, Hullabaloo, an exclusive Memento for weapon crafting, and a new hoverboard vehicle called a Skimmer were also made available as rewards; completing a specific quest would permanently unlock the Skimmer for use outside of the event—the Skimmer was a new type of vehicle, used in place of Sparrows. Hunters won the 2024 Guardian Games.

Guardian Games returned for Year 7 during Episode: Heresy (Season 26), running from March 11 until April 1, 2025. Replacing the Competitive strike playlist and focus activities was a boss rush mode called "Rushdown", in which a fireteam of three players faced a gauntlet of five bosses from strikes, seasonal story missions, and exotic quests of escalating difficulty. Like previous years' events, obtaining high scores in Rushdown, Supremacy, and Gambit granted buffs that would last until the weekly reset, and could be used to light torches around the Guardian Games Podium in the Tower, granting additional rewards. Options for class-based matchmaking continued to be available for Rushdown, Supremacy, and Gambit. The Heir Apparent exotic machine gun and its catalyst as well as The Title legendary submachine gun, the Taraxippos legendary scout rifle, the Hullabaloo legendary heavy grenade launcher, the exclusive Memento, and the Skimmer all returned as event-exclusive rewards, while a brand new event-exclusive legendary trace rifle, Keraunios, was made available as a reward. Titans won the 2025 Guardian Games.

The 2026 Guardian Games was won by the Warlocks. This was the final event, which occurred in Year 8 from March 24 to April 14, 2026, during the first half of Season: Lawless (Season 28).

=== Heavy Metal ===
Heavy Metal was a one-week PvP-themed event that was introduced during the Rite of the Nine event during Act 3 of Episode: Heresy (Season 26) from May 9 to 16, 2025. This event featured 3v3 matches between Fallen Brigs and Drake Tanks, with the goal to destroy the opposing team and collect tokens which dropped upon enemy death. Kills and tokens were worth 1 point each, while killing the top performer on the opposing team earned 3 points; the first team to reach 50 points won the match.

The event introduced a new reward hub called the Event Home for all events going forward, which replaced the premium Event Cards from previous seasonal events and was free to all players. The Event Home featured three rotating daily challenges which could be changed by spending a reroll chip, a weekly challenge, as well as a free reward track that progressed when completing daily and weekly challenges. Each daily and weekly challenge rewarded Event Tokens, which could be exchanged in the event reward store for event engrams, Glimmer, Enhancement Cores, and Prisms, as well as Exotic Ciphers. An event-exclusive reward, the Gryphon combat sparrow, was made available during this initial Heavy Metal event. It returned in Year 8 midway through Season: Reclamation (Season 27) on September 2, 2025, running for one week until September 9.

=== Arms Week ===
Arms Week was a one-week event that was introduced in Year 8 during the start of Season: Reclamation (Season 27), initially held from July 29 to August 5, 2025. The one-week event, hosted by Ada-1, focused on a particular weapon type with experimental weapon mods that could be applied to it. The event was for both PvE and PvP, with the latter having a special Arms Week playlist called Hardware, which disabled abilities and Supers, but it enabled volatile mods for curated weapons. The event was a successor to the Armsday event from the original Destiny.
