= Destiny 2: Beyond Light =

2020 expansion of Destiny 2

- Cover art featuring a Guardian sitting on Europa with a Darkness Pyramid ship in the background
- Developer: Bungie
- Publisher: Bungie
- Director: Luke Smith
- Composers: Michael Salvatori; Skye Lewin; Rotem Moav; Josh Mosser; Michael Sechrist
- Series: Destiny
- Platforms: PlayStation 4; PlayStation 5; Stadia; Windows; Xbox One; Xbox Series X/S
- Release: November 10, 2020
- Genres: Action role-playing, first-person shooter
- Mode: Multiplayer

Destiny 2: Beyond Light is a major expansion for Destiny 2, a first-person shooter video game developed by Bungie. Representing the fifth expansion and the fourth year of extended content for Destiny 2, it was released on November 10, 2020. Players travel to Jupiter's icy moon Europa to confront the Fallen Kell Eramis, who plans to use the power of the Darkness to save her people and take revenge on the Traveler back on Earth, as she and many Fallen believe that the Traveler had abandoned them before the Golden Age of humanity. The player's Guardian also obtains this new Darkness-based power as a subclass called Stasis, which features new ice-based abilities that can freeze enemies.

The expansion saw the return of the Exo Stranger from the original Destiny's (2014) campaign, as well as Variks from the original game's House of Wolves (2015) expansion, both of which guide the Guardian on Europa. Furthermore, Beyond Light added other content across the game, including missions, player versus environment locations, player gear, weaponry, and a raid. Beyond Light was the first expansion of Destiny 2 to be released on the PlayStation 5 and Xbox Series X/S platforms. Bungie had described this expansion as the beginning of a new era for the Destiny franchise. On June 4, 2024, the Beyond Light campaign became free-to-play, including access to Stasis, with the rest of the expansion's content repackaged as the Beyond Light Pack.

In addition to the expansion, some of the less played locations and activities from the first three years of Destiny 2 were cycled out of the game into what Bungie called the Destiny Content Vault (DCV), which also included all areas from the original Destiny. This was done to cut down on the install size of the game, but Bungie planned to cycle areas in and out of the DCV, updating older destinations to fit the current state of the game. Earth's Cosmodrome from the original game returned alongside Beyond Light. This location mainly serves as the introductory and tutorial destination for first-time players of the New Light free-to-play base game with a full questline, but it was also utilized for seasonal content. The original game's "Vault of Glass" raid also returned during Season 14, updated with Destiny 2 mechanics.

Beyond Light had four seasonal content offerings for Year 4 of the game: Season of the Hunt, which was available alongside Beyond Light, Season of the Chosen in February 2021, Season of the Splicer in May 2021, and Season of the Lost in August 2021, which lasted over six months (26 weeks) due to the delay of the next expansion, The Witch Queen, to February 2022. Due to the lengthened time, the Bungie 30th Anniversary Pack was released in December 2021, which added a new dungeon, a six-player activity, and gear inspired by Bungie's previous games as a celebration of the developer's 30th anniversary. With the release of The Witch Queen, this seasonal content was removed from the game with the exception of the Battlegrounds activity from Season of the Chosen and the content of the Bungie 30th Anniversary Pack; the Battlegrounds activity was merged under the Vanguard Operations playlist. The Astral Alignment activity from Season of the Lost was re-added in December 2025 as an arena activity.

The seasons bridged the events of Beyond Light to the next expansion, The Witch Queen. Following Beyond Light's campaign, Season of the Hunt centered on the Hive God of War Xivu Arath's attempt to conquer the Sol System by raising an army of corrupted "Wrathborn" using mysterious monoliths, with the Guardian assisting Osiris (who lost his Ghost, Sagira), The Spider, and the newly resurrected Guardian, Crow, who was formerly Prince Uldren Sov, to hunt the Wrathborn. In Season of the Chosen, the Cabal Empress Caiatl demanded that Commander Zavala's Vanguard bow to her and form an alliance against the Hive, but Zavala refused, prompting a shadow war of ceremonial combat to defeat her growing War Council and prevent the Last City's subjugation. Season of the Splicer saw the Vex plunge the Last City into an "Endless Night", requiring Ikora Rey and the Vanguard to recruit Mithrax, a Sacred Splicer and Kell of the House of Light, to hack the Vex Network and expunge the Vex. In Season of the Lost, Queen Mara Sov returned to the Dreaming City to exorcise her captive, the Witch Queen Savathûn, where in exchange for removing Savathûn's parasitic Worm, Savathûn promised to return Osiris, who she had secretly been possessing for months.

== Gameplay ==
Beyond Light maintains the basic gameplay of Destiny 2; the player, as a Guardian using a power called Light that gives them superhuman abilities and the ability to be regenerated, fights in a mix of first-person and third-person shooter gameplay in both player versus environment and player versus player activities in a massively multiplayer online game world. Cooperative activities include various bounties, story-related missions, "strikes," dungeons, raids, open-world public events, and special seasonal events, while competitive matches include matches with other Guardians in the Crucible or a team versus team mode in the Gambit arena. Players are rewarded with both new weapons and armor as well as various materials that are used as a form of in-game currency to gain or upgrade other equipment. Players can have up to three active characters, one from each of the game's main classes: Titan, Hunter, and Warlock, each that has several subclasses based on the type of elemental damage they select prior to missions. Players seek to improve their character's overall Power level—a rough average measuring the quality of weapons and gear they have collected—that allows them to take on more challenging activities in the game.

Prior to Beyond Light, there were three main elemental damage types, Arc, Solar, and Void, which are rooted in a power called Light. Beyond Light introduces a fourth elemental damage type called Stasis, which creates ice and cold-based damage, and is rooted in the power of the Darkness. Each class gets a new subclass for Stasis abilities: the Warlock's Shadebinder has them using an icy staff that shoots projectiles and unleashes an explosion to freeze and shatter enemies through their "Winter's Wrath" super, the Hunter's Revenant utilizes dual ice kamas that they can throw and create icy storms to trap and freeze enemies through their super "Silence and Squall", while the Titan's Behemoth uses frozen gauntlets to allow for melee destruction and unleash icy shockwaves on the ground that freezes enemies through their super "Glacial Quake". Further, other abilities of this subclass can be customized by gaining a range of Aspects and Fragments through quests, and assigning them to the core abilities. For example, players can opt to have their grenades explode into a wall of crystals, or create a field that slows and freezes enemies stuck within it through these Aspects and Fragments. Game director Luke Smith said that these new customization options for the Stasis subclasses are an "experiment...to see how this goes", with Bungie later confirming that Light classes would receive similar customization updates within The Witch Queen expansion. Stasis powers were modified multiple times through the months after Beyond Light's release, notably tuning the powers' use in player-vs-player matches to reduce the impact of freezing effects. According to Kevin Yanes, one reason to introduce Stasis was to address the issue of aggressive play in the Crucible prior to Beyond Light, and knew they would have to adjust it over time as they saw how players adapted to Stasis.

Beyond Light was the first major revision to the larger game universe. Five of the game's destinations that were available during the first three years of Destiny 2—Titan, Io, Mars, Mercury, and the Leviathan ship and their associated campaigns and other activities—as well as activities and content from Year 2's Annual Pass, were removed from the game and placed in the Destiny Content Vault (DCV). A wholly new destination, Jupiter's moon Europa, was added to the game as well as a subset of Earth's Cosmodrome, previously featured in the first Destiny, along with some of the Destiny Cosmodrome activities reworked for Destiny 2, as well as the addition of two Lost Sectors in areas not previously accessible in the original game. While Bungie had planned to expand out the Cosmodrome to the full version from the original Destiny over the course of Year 4 (excluding the Plaguelands location from the original game's Rise of Iron expansion), Bungie later stated during Season 13 that they had cancelled these plans in favor of focusing on future new content.

A new raid mission, "Deep Stone Crypt", was released on November 21, 2020, during Season 12, and takes place in the Clovis Bray facility located on Europa, which is the birthplace of the Exos. Subsequently, a number of new activities on Europa were unlocked for all players once the raid was completed. The "Vault of Glass" raid, which was the very first raid of the original Destiny, was added on May 22, 2021, during Season 14 for all players to access. It features the same story as the original, but accounts for differences in Destiny 2, such as gameplay mechanics and newer Vex enemy units, as well as a new starting instance to replace the absent Venus destination that had been present in the first game (players begin the raid in the same location as the original, but cannot explore Venus beyond this area). A node called Legends was added on the Destinations tab of the Director, which is where "Vault of Glass" is accessed from, and serves as the hub for any other legacy content that Bungie may unvault in the future. Previous Destiny strikes "The Devil's Lair", and "Fallen S.A.B.E.R.", and "The Will of Crota" were added with the introduction of the Cosmodrome, with "The Will of Crota" renamed as "The Disgraced" and reworked to line up with the "New Light" story line for new players. Another new strike, "Proving Grounds", was added during Season 13. Other major gameplay changes include:

- The shell for the player's Ghost, which in-game provides an A.I. companion for the Guardian and aids in respawning the character if they die, can now be customized with modifications, similar to other armor pieces introduced with the Armor 2.0 system. Prior to Beyond Light, while the player could obtain Ghost shells with various properties, these were typically fixed or had some random generated perks given to them. Bungie stated this was intended to give even further customization options to the character.
- The hybrid PvE/PvP Gambit mode that was added with Forsaken (2018) dropped the original three-round mode in favor of the single-round Gambit Prime mode (renamed as Gambit) that was introduced during Year 2's Season of the Drifter (Season 6), tweaking some of the enemies that spawn in the mode and other timing factors. Impacts of armor from the Reckoning (a PvE arena activity that was also introduced in Season of the Drifter), which could boost certain Gambit gameplay factors, such as being able to summon more powerful blockers to the opponent's side of the map, were reworked into armor mods.
- With the launch of Beyond Light, all non-exotic weapons and gear had a Power infusion cap, meaning older weapons and gear introduced in previous seasons had a maximum Power infusion limit and would eventually be less viable in activities that required a high Power level. For example, gear from the first two years of Destiny 2 had a max Power cap of 1050, which was the starting Power level for Beyond Light, making them more ineffective as the player advanced further into the campaign. Going forward, new non-exotic armor and weapons introduced in a season would typically have a Power level cap that would make them viable for the current and the subsequent three seasons. However, after two seasons, Bungie recognized this approach was not ideal, and starting with Season 14, no longer includes infusion caps on equipment, although gear that had already been sunset remained sunsetted. Bungie stated that they planned to revisit how to sunset gear after they released the game's next major expansion, The Witch Queen, which was delayed to early 2022.
- Players can now re-obtain any abandoned quests through a quest archive kiosk in the Tower; this kiosk also grants veteran players access to the new player questline, which reworked the original Destiny's opening missions as a new questline for first-time players. Players also have access to an exotic archive in the Tower as well, where they can purchase exotic, pinnacle, and pursuit weapons from associated areas, activities, and seasons that were placed into the DCV. In keeping it fair to players who obtained the weapons by their original means, the weapons cost a substantial amount of various in-game currencies, as well as hard to obtain items. The majority of vaulted catalysts for exotic weapons from previous seasons returned during Season 13, with new means to acquire and upgrade them; other vaulted catalysts returned in later seasons.
- Beginning with Season 13, the weekly bounty system for the core activities, through which players were able to obtain more substantial rewards and Bright Dust, was dropped in favor of a seasonal challenge-based system, designed to address the "fear of missing out" (FOMO) when players are unable to log in for a week or more. Each week of the season introduces new challenges that when completed can be turned in for similar rewards as the prior weekly bounties. These challenges stack up through the first ten weeks of a season and only require completion once on any character in one's account, but after the season, it is impossible to earn these challenges or associated rewards that are not tied to a seasonal activity; seasonal challenges that are tied to a seasonal activity remain for as long as the seasonal activity is in the game as these reward unique progress towards the seasonal content. Daily bounties were unchanged and remain available.
- Coupled with the new seasonal challenges, the progression systems for rewards in the Crucible and Gambit playlists were also adjusted in Season 13, so that by earning points in Valor or Infamy, respectfully, the player would earn ranks and unlock fixed rewards at certain rank levels, eliminating the previous use of rewarded tokens from that activity. By Season 15, a similar change was made for the Vanguard strikes activity, as well as an adjustment across all three playlists to adjust how these ranks are earned to be more consistent across all three activities. A similar plan was added for Trials of Osiris in Season 15, altering rewards and introducing matchmaking as well as solo queuing so that players can earn the rewards for Trials, though the adept rewards will remain limited to those that complete through multiple wins with no losses.
- Starting with Season 14, the Power level increases for each non-expansion seasons was reduced to 10 (previously 50), meaning that players who have maxed out their gear in the prior season will only have to level up through pinnacle gear activities. This change was in response to player complaints about the grind required to get to the new Power level at the start of each season.
- Armor transmogrification, or transmog for short, officially called Armor Synthesis, was added to the game with Season 14 and allows players to convert previously acquired armor in their collections into universal ornaments that can be applied to other armor pieces. Ada-1, a returning NPC from Year 2's Season of the Forge (Season 5), offers quests and bounties to support transmog currencies from most activities, or alternatively, players can use microtransactions to bypass the activities and obtain the materials directly. As part of this system, a new appearance customization screen is available to the player to easily switch universal ornaments and armor shaders, which no longer are kept as inventory items but simply unlocked once per account once acquired. For Season 15, the intermediate in-game currency needed to purchase the bounties related to transmog was removed, allowing these to be purchased by the standard game currency, Glimmer.
- Challenges and difficulty options for raids and dungeons, starting with the "Vault of Glass" raid, were added midseason during Season 14, offering better rewards similar to adept weapons and weapon modifications that are offered for Trials of Osiris and Grandmaster Nightfall completions. In the case of the "Vault of Glass" raid, completing the master difficulty challenge for the raid unlocked "Timelost" weapons that had additional perks and could be equipped with advanced weapon mods obtainable from the grandmaster strikes.
- Cross-platform play across all platforms supported by the game was added with the launch of Season 15. Further, BattlEye anti-cheat middleware was incorporated into the game clients for competitive gameplay modes.
- A number of major weapon rebalancing changes were introduced in Season 15, among those eliminating the need to collect primary ammo and adjustments to perks that would affect primary ammo, and the introduction of non-exotic Stasis weapons as well as Stasis-based armor.
- Alongside the release of content released in the Bungie 30th Anniversary Pack, Destiny 2 was updated to perform a major rework of class abilities and Supers, with the aim to prevent one-shot eliminations in Crucible matches save for rare cases. The new system, called Variable Ability Cooldowns, allows Bungie to tune the cooldowns of abilities and Supers on a per-class, per-element basis, where as previously the cooldown rates had been fixed. This allowed Bungie to have certain abilities to be powerful but with a long cooldown, while a weak ability may have a short cooldown and used more frequently.
- With The Witch Queen, Bungie planned to add automatic fire to weapons such as hand cannons, sidearms, and pulse rifles as an accessibility feature. Ahead of that, with the Bungie 30th Anniversary Pack, Bungie introduced an auto-fire mod that can be used on these weapons as a preview of this feature.
- The cost to slot mods into weapons or armor was eliminated with the Bungie 30th Anniversary Pack. As a result, this allowed external third-party websites that enabled players to manage their gear outside the game to now also manage mods as part of gear loadouts.

=== Seasonal changes ===
In addition to the major story and content added with Beyond Light, Bungie also divided the year into four seasons. With each season, Power Level minimums and caps were raised. Each season offered a free-tier and paid-tier season pass to acquire new gear, game currency, and cosmetics, as well as new activities and triumphs associated with those activities, some of which required purchase of the season pass to access. Unlike the previous year (Year 3), in which seasonal content became unavailable at the conclusion of each season, the seasonal activities and story missions could still be accessed in subsequent seasons for the duration of Year 4 (some triumphs, however, could only be completed during the active season). At the conclusion of Year 4, however, all of the year's seasonal activities and story missions (except the Battlegrounds activity from Season 13) were removed from the game, although the Astral Alignment activity from Season 15 was later re-added as an arena activity with the Renegades expansion in December 2025.

Season of the Hunt (Season 12) began with the launch of Beyond Light on November 10, 2020; season pass progression began this day, but the actual seasonal narrative and associated activities did not begin until November 17. New and existing players' Power levels were increased to the new minimum Power level of 1050, a soft cap of 1200, with the hard Power level cap set to 1250, and the pinnacle reward cap at 1260. The season added the "Wrathborn Hunts" activity to the Tangled Shore and Dreaming City destinations, in which the player charged a lure, called a Cryptolith Lure, with select mods to draw out one of four chosen bosses (a fifth later became available but via a special mission that could only be done once a week; this was the final mission for the season's narrative). Completing the hunts earned seasonal weapons or gear with the help of new seasonal vendor Crow. The season also introduced a questline to recover Hawkmoon, an exotic hand cannon from the original game; a reprised version of the mission was later added, which dropped random perks on Hawkmoon, making Hawkmoon the first exotic in the franchise to have random perks as the perks on all other prior exotics were preset. The seasonal artifact featured during this season was the Fang of Xivu Arath (featuring mods focusing on mid-range weapons and Solar and Void abilities).

Season of the Chosen (Season 13) began on February 9, 2021, bringing the hard Power level cap to 1300 and pinnacle reward cap to 1310. A new match-made three-player PvE activity called "Battlegrounds" was also introduced and featured on Nessus, Europa, and Earth's Cosmodrome. Players challenged Cabal commanders and their forces that were seeking Empress Caiatl's favor across the different destinations for powerful rewards after powering up a special Cabal artifact called the Hammer of Proving. A new area in the Tower was added called the Hub for Emergency Logistics and Maneuvers (H.E.L.M.) and was the central location for this season's content, as well as the location of the Prismatic Recaster, which returned from Season of Arrivals (Season 11) along with Umbral Engrams, using charges from the Hammer as part of the Umbral refining process. A brand new strike called "Proving Grounds" was added midseason and served as the final mission for the season's narrative; season pass holders gained early access to the strike a week before its full release for all players on March 30, 2021. Similar to the Hawkmoon questline in Season 12, Season 13 added an exotic quest called "Presage", taking place on a derelict Cabal ship in the Tangled Shore, to recover Dead Man's Tale, a brand new exotic scout rifle; subsequent runs of the mission awarded random perk drops on Dead Man's Tale, while completing its Master version awarded the weapon's exotic catalyst. The seasonal artifact featured during this season was the Bell of Conquests (featuring mods focusing on long-range weapons and Arc, Solar, and Stasis abilities).

Season of the Splicer (Season 14) began on May 11, 2021, with the hard Power level raised to 1310 and the pinnacle reward cap to 1320. A new six-player matchmade activity called "Override" was introduced and available on Europa, Earth's Moon, and the Tangled Shore, rotating between the destinations each week (one further one located in the Last City was added during the season's epilogue). Override tied into the season's narrative in which the Vex had trapped the Last City in an endless night simulation; in this activity, a fireteam had to defeat the Vex as well as Vex simulations of Cabal (Europa), Hive (Moon), Scorn (Tangled Shore), and Taken (Last City) to hack into the Vex network and defeat its boss to steal data in a means to find a way to end the endless night simulation, all while powering up a special Eliksni artifact called the Splicer Gauntlet. The H.E.L.M. was expanded to support this additional activity and was made as its own destination selection node outside of the Tower. A weekly pinnacle story mission called "Expunge" was also introduced in the third week of the season. These missions were also available on the aforementioned destinations but could be accessed at anytime (once they became available) and took place entirely within the Vex network; the objective of these missions was to collapse domains of the Vex network, with more difficult "corrupted" versions where the Taken have commandeered the network. The seventh and final Expunge mission served as the final mission for the season's narrative until the epilogue quest at the end of the season. The seasonal artifact featured during this season was the Paradrome Cube (featuring mods focusing on close-range and explosive weapons and Void, Arc, and Stasis abilities).

Season of the Lost (Season 15) began on August 24, 2021, and lasted over six months (26 weeks), running until the launch of the next expansion, The Witch Queen, which was originally planned for November 2021, but was delayed to February 22, 2022. The hard Power level was raised to 1320 and the Pinnacle reward cap was raised to 1330. It featured the return of Mara Sov, queen of the Awoken, with the season's narrative focusing on her return to the Dreaming City to free it from the Taken and Savathûn's influence, serving as a prelude to The Witch Queen. A new six-player matchmade activity called "Astral Alignment" was introduced and took place in the Dreaming City; in this activity, a fireteam had to defeat the Scorn and Taken while activating several Awoken beacons to align the ley line network in order to chart a path into the Ascendant Realm. The H.E.L.M. was expanded again to support this additional activity and also provided access to Mara Sov's chambers in the Dreaming City. A weekly pinnacle story mission called "The Shattered Realm" was added, taking place in three areas of the Ascendant Realm; the objective of these missions was to locate the Awoken Techeuns and rescue them from the Taken, Scorn, and Hive. An exotic mission to claim the exotic Stasis trace rifle Ager's Scepter was also added. The seasonal artifact featured during this season was the Wayfinder's Compass (featuring mods focusing on mid-range weapons and Solar and Stasis abilities).

Due to the lengthened Season of the Lost (lasting over six months instead of the normal three due to The Witch Queen's delay), new content and activities were added as part of the Bungie 30th Anniversary Pack on December 7, 2021, to run concurrent with the season until the release of The Witch Queen. The event added gear and cosmetics based on Bungie's prior games from the past 30 years, including Marathon, Myth, and Halo. The pack also added gear from the original Destiny, including the exotic rocket launcher Gjallarhorn as well as its catalyst. A free-to-play six-player matchmade activity, "Dares of Eternity", has players facing challenges against random enemies presented to them by Xûr and the celestial Starhorse as if on a game show, with the final boss being one of three returning bosses from the original Destiny. A new three-player dungeon, "Grasp of Avarice", which requires purchase of the pack, has Guardians exploring beyond the mouth of the "loot cave" in the Cosmodrome that had been present in the original Destiny. (Note: The Destiny "loot cave" was so named that it spawned an endless and constant stream of enemies which allowed players to gain item drops at a much faster rate than other activities in Destiny at the time.) Tied to the pack was the introduction of the annual "Moments of Triumph" seal, featuring triumphs across the various Beyond Light content and seasons. The content of the Bungie 30th Anniversary Pack was not removed when The Witch Queen launched.

== Plot ==
One year after the Nightmare Hunts on Earth's Moon, Beyond Light focuses on Eramis the Shipstealer, a former Baroness of the House of Devils, now known as the Kell of Darkness, who plans to use the power of the Darkness to save her people and take revenge on the Traveler back on Earth, as she and many Fallen believe that the Traveler had abandoned them before the Golden Age of humanity. At the end of Season of Arrivals, the Traveler reawakened to heal itself of its wounds incurred during The Red War three years ago to defend Earth from the encroaching Darkness—its Black Fleet of Pyramid ships had just consumed Io, Mars, Mercury, and Titan. Beyond Light begins in the immediate aftermath in which the Guardian is sent out across the Solar System to patrol for further evidence of the spreading Darkness. While on Jupiter's icy moon Europa, where the Darkness had invited the Guardian to discover an ancient power, the player's Ghost detects a distress call from Variks the Loyal, who was partly responsible for the Prison of Elders revolt that resulted in Cayde-6's death during Forsaken two years ago. Despite their wariness to his loyalty, the Guardian rescues Variks from a Fallen patrol. Variks warns them of Eramis, who has been named the new Kell of Kells; she has brought the Houses of the Fallen together as House Salvation to fight against those that are protected by the Traveler by using Stasis, a power of the Darkness that she has learned to wield and passed on to her lieutenants—Phylaks, the Warrior; Praksis, the Technocrat; Kridis, the Dark Priestess; and Atraks, the Wildcard—through Splinters of Darkness obtained from a Pyramid ship silently hovering over Europa's surface.

The Guardian finds themself quickly outmatched against Eramis' Stasis powers and retreats to safety. The Darkness then contacts the Guardian through Ghost, drawing them via a Crux of Darkness to a remote location on Europa overlooking the Pyramid ship where they find a Ziggurat made of the same material facing it, as well as the Exo Stranger, last seen at the end of the original Destiny's campaign, alongside Eris Morn and the Drifter fighting off Fallen troops. The Exo Stranger explains that she comes from a different timeline where the Darkness won. Just as she had provided aid to the Guardian against the Vex six years ago, she has returned to the present time to help prevent the Darkness from claiming victory and causing a second Collapse. She helps guide the Guardian to defeat Eramis' lieutenants, collect their Splinters, and commune with the Darkness through its Cruxes and the Ziggurat to be able to harness Stasis for themselves as to be able to defeat Eramis herself, methods that both Ghost and Commander Zavala do not trust but recognize as the only solution. Along this route, the Guardian learns that part of Eramis' plan is to reactivate a Vex portal that was built by Clovis Bray I as part of his inhumane research into Exo development.

Ultimately, the Guardian is able to defeat Eramis (who becomes trapped in Stasis ice) and three of her lieutenants and comes to have full control over Stasis after embracing their own inner Darkness inside the Pyramid. While the immediate threat to humanity is ended, Zavala cautions the Guardian to make sure the Darkness they possess does not spread. Afterwards, the Stranger assists the Guardian in further controlling their Stasis powers so that they can use it to protect humanity. The Stranger also reveals that she is actually Elisabeth "Elsie" Bray, the granddaughter of Clovis Bray I and sister of Ana Bray, revived as an Exo due to a fatal illness; she also despises her grandfather for his experiments. The Guardian also continues to assist Variks to take down any remaining Fallen threats attempting to claim Eramis' vacant throne, as well as aiding Fallen refugees in escaping Europa to Earth to join an allied faction of Fallen, proper name Eliksni, called the House of Light, led by ally Mithrax, Kell of Light. In the course of the Guardian's efforts to decrypt Clovis I's research on Stasis, Elsie comes face-to-face with Ana, who is appalled at her and the Guardian's use of Darkness, as well as her sister's confession that she was forced to kill Ana in her dark future.

The Guardian is later contacted by Elsie, who has discovered that the remnants of House Salvation have located the fabled Deep Stone Crypt, a Clovis Bray facility that served as the birthplace of the Exos. Fearing that Eramis' followers are using the Crypt's Exo technology and secrets for their own nefarious ends, a fireteam of Guardians assembled by Elsie make their way through the frozen Europan wasteland in the midst of a harsh blizzard to locate the facility ("Deep Stone Crypt" raid). The Guardians make their way through the Crypt after disabling its security systems, wherein they discover "Clarity Control", a Darkness statue similar to the one found in the Pyramid, which Clovis Bray I used to commune with the Darkness and utilize it alongside Vex technology to aid in the development of Exos. It is revealed that Clovis I combined Vex radiolarian fluid with concentrated Darkness to perfect the Exo program, cementing the link between mind and body, and achieving immortality for humanity. They find Atraks, the last of Eramis' lieutenants, who has been converted into an Exo herself called Atraks-1, Fallen Exo, using the Crypt's Exo technology and the Darkness from Clarity Control to rebuild Taniks, the Scarred. The fireteam defeats Atraks-1 while Taniks confronts the fireteam as they board a space station orbiting Europa called the Morning Star, where Taniks activates its nuclear descent protocol to send the space station crashing down on the Jovian moon and decimate it upon impact; the Guardians manage to disarm the descent protocol as the station breaks apart and enters Europa's atmosphere. The fireteam manages to survive the crash and they emerge from the wreckage afterwards, finding themselves back at the entrance to the Deep Stone Crypt. As they investigate the Morning Star's wreckage, they discover that Taniks had also survived, who re-emerges as a grotesque mechanical being called Taniks, the Abomination. The Guardians defeat Taniks once and for all, securing the Deep Stone Crypt from further threats from House Salvation.

In the aftermath of Taniks' defeat, the Guardian continues to work with Variks and Elsie as remnants of the Morning Star perpetually rain down onto the surface of Europa, hoping to stop any Fallen from salvaging the debris for their own ends. As well, the Guardian is contacted by the preserved artificial intelligence copy of Clovis Bray I, discovered to be a giant Exo head located deep within the Bray Exoscience facility. Further investigation reveals that Banshee-44, who fell unconscious at the same time the Morning Star was destroyed, is in fact the Exo form of the original Clovis Bray. Numerous resets altered the exo's personality, making him ashamed of the man he was made from. Clovis-43 asked Elsie to modify his memories so that upon his next reset, he would have no memory of the name Clovis Bray I or what the man had done. Banshee is disturbed by the revelation, but accepts it begrudgingly. Banshee assists the Guardian in finding and repairing the Lament, an exotic sword with a chainsaw blade used by the Clovis exo during his war with the Vex on Europa. Banshee vows to never become his former, tyrannical self. Shortly after, Elsie and Ana reconcile to confront the giant Clovis AI together. Ana comes to understand Elsie's actions in killing her in the dark future while Elsie apologizes from withholding the truth, stating she was trying to protect Ana. The two sisters agree to work together and then confront Clovis and proclaim that they will use the Darkness to protect humanity from evil like him, instead of what Clovis had intended, which was to use it for research purposes only to continue the legacy of the Bray name.

=== Season of the Hunt ===
Shortly after Eramis' defeat and in the midst of the Guardian's continued efforts to drive back remaining Fallen threats on Europa, Commander Zavala informs the Guardian that the former Warlock Vanguard Osiris has been trying to assess the damage done by the Darkness' return. Osiris was investigating the Scarlet Keep on Earth's Moon in his belief that Xivu Arath—the Hive God of War and youngest sister to Oryx, the Taken King and Savathûn, the Witch Queen—would take advantage of the chaos. Osiris' Ghost, Sagira, was slain by the High Celebrant of Xivu Arath, leaving him Lightless. Sent to the Moon to save Osiris, the Guardian finds him on the hunt for the High Celebrant to avenge Sagira. Osiris is nearly killed by a Hive Knight in the Shrine of Oryx before he is rescued by a resurrected Uldren Sov, now a Guardian calling himself the Crow—upon resurrection, Guardians have no memories of their past life from before becoming a Guardian. Crow tells them that his boss, the Spider, wants to see them. At his safehouse on the Tangled Shore, Spider reveals that the High Celebrant is using artifacts of Darkness called cryptoliths to corrupt Cabal, Fallen, and other Hive into a mindless, enraged army called Wrathborn, and proposes a partnership with the Guardian, offering his resources to help end the threat, which is interfering with his business. Spider confides to the Guardian that he found the newly-reborn Uldren wandering the Reef and employed him, knowing the murderer of Cayde-6 would likely be killed again for his crime if he had been sent to the Last City. However, Spider secretly rigged Crow's Ghost, Glint, with a bomb in case he were to go rogue, and warns the Guardian not to inform Crow of his former self. Meanwhile, the Awoken Queen, Mara Sov, informs the system of her intent to return to reality, confront Savathûn, and end the Dreaming City's curse.

Over the next few weeks, the Guardian assists Crow in hunting various Fallen and Hive Wrathborn, namely Savek and HKD-1 on the Tangled Shore and Dul Arath and Xillox in the Dreaming City. Crow begins experiencing dreams of a hawk and several places he had traveled to in his previous life as Uldren Sov. Fearing these may be signs of a larger catastrophe approaching, the Guardian investigates these locations but instead discovers that Crow's dreams are paracausal remnants left by the Traveler, a message that leads them to discover and reforge Hawkmoon, a weapon of Light reborn by the Traveler to fight the Darkness ("Harbinger" exotic mission). Through this, the Guardian grows to finally see that Crow is not the same person who killed Cayde-6, and the pair develop a strong relationship.

Crow and Osiris eventually uncover the location of the High Celebrant in the Dreaming City, and Crow joins the Guardian in assassinating the Ascendant Hive Knight. As a reward, Spider promises the Guardian any prize from his lair, to which the Guardian responds by liberating Crow from his bondage under his boss. Spider reluctantly honors the deal, ordering the two to leave his lair. A grateful Crow questions why the Guardian freed him, to which the Guardian proclaims that Crow is also a Guardian. Shortly after, Spider has his engineers remove the bomb from Glint, while Crow says he will remain on the Tangled Shore for a little while longer to help hunt down any remaining Wrathborn. In the final week of the season, Crow decides that he will leave the Reef. He said he thought about going off and exploring remote locations, like the planet Venus, but Osiris convinced him that he should come to the Tower, despite what others may think of him based on his previous life, and Crow proudly accepts himself as a Guardian.

=== Season of the Chosen ===
Following the defeat of Dominus Ghaul at the end of the Red War over three years ago, Caiatl, who helped Ghaul rise to power and is the daughter of the exiled Emperor Calus, declared herself the Empress of the Cabal. She has since been piecing the fractured Cabal back together with her army of chosen warriors. Shortly after Caiatl's ascension to the throne as Empress, Xivu Arath led an attack on Torobatl, the Cabal homeworld, with the aid of Savathûn, driving Caiatl and her forces from it. In her attempts to bring the remnants of the Red Legion under her command, she finds that several lingering outposts were corrupted by the Hive cryptoliths that created the Wrathborn. Her plans to locate and capture her estranged father were also halted due to the invading Pyramid fleet of the Darkness. With Xivu Arath pushed back as a result of the Guardian's efforts in defeating the Wrathborn, Caiatl comes to Earth to seek a possible truce with the Vanguard by inviting Commander Zavala to her War Council to team up against the Hive and the Darkness, but demands Zavala and Osiris bow to her alongside the offer. Zavala refuses, and Caiatl instead marks the Guardians as enemies alongside the Hive, proclaiming that she will see them on the battlegrounds.

Afterwards, Zavala explains to the Guardians that Caiatl is mounting an army to fight against humanity. As disgraced Cabal factions join Caiatl's forces, Zavala establishes a task force out of the H.E.L.M. (Hub for Emergency Logistics and Maneuvers) in the Tower, consisting of himself, Lord Saladin, Osiris, Crow (who wears a mask to hide his face), Amanda Holliday (providing air support and intel), and the Guardian to challenge various Cabal commanders—namely, Commander Dracus and Ixel, the Far-Reaching on Nessus, Basilius the Golem on Europa, and Val Ma'rag in Earth's Cosmodrome—and weaken Caiatl's forces to prevent her from gaining too much power. From data collected on Nessus, Crow discovers the Cabal are using Vex prediction engines to study futures where Zavala has been killed, and with the Guardian's help, suspects that Caiatl is plotting to assassinate Zavala by temporarily disabling his Ghost using a Light-disruptor created from stolen City tech. After a failed assassination attempt on Zavala by a Cabal Psion, during which Zavala almost sees Crow without his mask, Osiris assigns Crow to be Zavala's bodyguard, though acting from a distance and never to show his face to him due to his past life.

Amid this offensive, a Vanguard communication is received from a Cabal ship, the Glykon, lingering out in the Reef, which had left Earth along with Emperor Calus' fleet when the Darkness arrived in the system, but had since gone off course. Zavala tells the player's Guardian that it appears to be from another Guardian that was investigating the ship, and asks the player's Guardian to follow up ("Presage" exotic mission). Aboard the drifting craft, the Guardian finds it has been taken over by the Scorn, led by the Locus of Communion, with the Cabal crew long dead. After battling the Scorn and the Locus, the Guardian finds the remains of a Hunter named Katabasis (later revealed to be one of Calus' Shadows), and recovers his prized exotic scout rifle, the Dead Man's Tale, which they bring back to Zavala as part of their report. The Guardian further investigates the Glykon each week, receiving communication from Osiris and Caiatl, who believed that Calus was on the ship or at least information there could lead her to him. It is revealed that Calus had visited the ship while his Loyalists aboard had captured Scorn from the Tangled Shore and experimented on them using the Crown of Sorrow in an attempt for Calus to commune with the Darkness. The Guardian eventually finds the Crown of Sorrow itself hidden in a room below the remains of Katabasis, where Osiris makes arrangements for the Vanguard to extract the Hive artifact from the Glykon for containment, despite Caiatl's concerns about keeping it intact.

After weeks of battling Caiatl's commanders and after the assassination attempt, Zavala decides to challenge Caiatl to the ceremonial Rite of Proving to settle their dispute, with each side sending their best champions to fight. A team of three Guardians successfully best Caiatl's chosen warriors, led by Ignovun, Chosen of Caiatl, aboard her land tank on Nessus, the Halphas Electus, and Caiatl agrees to a truce and withdraw the Cabal from Earth. Caiatl and Zavala meet to agree to terms on a blood oath, but a rogue Psion attempts to assassinate Zavala again. Caiatl orders the Psion captured, asserting she had no knowledge of the plot, while in defending Zavala, Crow's mask is accidentally removed, revealing himself. Although surprised at first, Zavala lends a hand in gratitude. Back in the H.E.L.M., Crow says he felt that Zavala understood who he was and that it was a relief to not have to hide behind his mask, but he was ordered to lie low for the time being. Zavala also ordered Crow to go on a reconnaissance mission to continue to scout the Cabal. In a debriefing with Zavala, he is troubled that the truth of Crow had been kept from him and wonders if there are other secrets, while he also has unease over Caiatl's truce. Also as part of the agreement, any Cabal that elect to remain on Earth are no longer under Caiatl's command and are left to the Guardians to do as they see fit.

=== Season of the Splicer ===
Following the armistice between Empress Caiatl and the Vanguard, the Vex find a way to plunge the Last City into a simulation of an endless night. The Warlock Vanguard Ikora Rey and her former mentor Osiris cannot determine the means to stop it. Ikora suggests the Guardian seek Mithrax, the Kell of House Light, who has been aiding Variks to evacuate Eliksni survivors from Europa from the Vex and the remains of Eramis' forces. Mithrax is revealed to be a Sacred Splicer, who has extensive knowledge on the Vex beyond that of the Vanguard. On Europa, after finding the remains of a skiff brought down by Vex forces in the area, the Guardian finds Mithrax protecting a small group of Eliksni survivors. Still uncertain of his trust in humanity and the Vanguard, Mithrax offers to show the Guardian how to enter a Vex simulation as to distract them and steal key data, giving himself enough time to continue the Eliksni evacuation. After the Guardian successfully hacks the Vex network, Ikora offers Mithrax and the House of Light refuge in the Last City, with the support of Osiris and Lakshmi-2, the leader of the Future War Cult, one of three factions of the Last City who use Vex technology to foresee the future rife with war. While most of the Eliksni take up shelter in the abandoned Botza District (as previously featured in the "Scourge of the Past" raid in Season 5, Season of the Forge), a number remain in the Tower Annex and a new wing of the H.E.L.M. that's opened to oversee operations related to the new Vex offensive. Mithrax continues his Eliksni evacuation on Europa but instructs the Vanguard remotely through a scavenged House Salvation Servitor at the H.E.L.M. as a means to improve their infiltration and hacking of the Vex simulations. Meanwhile, Lakshmi secretly contacts the Guardian through a secure channel, informing them of a vision she had of the Eliksni invading the Last City; citing the Vanguard's refusal to heed her warning about the Red War years prior, she is determined to drive out the House of Light from the Last City. Saint-14 also takes issue with helping the Eliksni, as he believes that their scarce resources should only be used to help the people of the Last City during this endless night.

Over the weeks, the Guardian continues to tackle Vex simulations appearing on Europa, Earth's Moon, and the Tangled Shore, hack into their network and defeat the Subjugated Minds Tacitas, Portunos, and Thesmotae within them, slowly weakening the endless night shrouding the Last City. Additionally, the Guardian attempts to collapse domains of the Vex network by defeating the Oppressive Minds Fantis, Dikast, and Dimio. Lakshmi, however, continues to broadcast her own propaganda to the people of the City, inciting hate toward the House of Light, while also singing a tune of unity for the people of the City that eerily has the same melody as Savathûn's song. At some point, Mithrax and Lakshmi get into an argument over sabotaged resources meant for the Eliksni, forcing the Guardian and Saint to intervene. Saint attempts to reason with Mithrax by citing humanity's fear of the Eliksni, but Mithrax responds by citing Saint as a monster himself in the Eliksni's eyes, telling a story of Saint's genocide of his people. Saint takes this to heart, and becomes empathetic towards the Eliksni.

During a routine mission to collapse a Vex network domain, Mithrax discovers that the Dreaming Mind Quria, Blade Transform, a Taken Vex Axis Mind that serves Savathûn (previously referenced in Destiny's The Taken King expansion), was able to invade the Vex network and turn it against the Vex by corrupting it with Taken energy. It is also discovered that Savathûn, through Quria's control over the Vex network, is responsible for the endless night simulation, which has strengthened with Taken Blights appearing throughout the Tower and the Last City. The Guardian's mission then changes to now drive the Taken out of the Vex network to expose and destroy Quria and foil Savathûn's schemes. After discussing the matter with Osiris and Ikora, the latter intends to keep the news secret within the Vanguard to prevent a panic. However, Lakshmi was able to learn the truth via anonymous sources. As she attempts to broadcast to the people of the Last City, Ikora intervenes and asks the citizens to unite with the Vanguard and the Eliksni to drive out the Vex threat. After navigating through several Taken-infected Vex simulations to triangulate Quria's position for Mithrax, the Guardian fights through a final layered simulation filled with Taken and Vex forces and defeats Quria, seemingly ending the immediate threat to the Last City, and the endless night simulation begins to slowly dissipate. Lakshmi seems grateful that the immediate threat is gone, however, she still does not have faith in the current Vanguard's leadership, believing Ikora and Zavala should be replaced.

Despite the city returning to a peaceful state after Quria's defeat, Lakshmi continues to fear the Eliksni presence. She announces a city-wide sweep of all the Eliksni by the Future War Cult and New Monarchy, claiming Osiris is helping them, to isolate them to the Botza District and use Vex technology to try to open a rift to exile the Eliksni through, but they are overwhelmed by Vex that emerge from the portal. While the Guardian enters the rift to close it, Mithrax and Saint work together to protect the Eliksni from the Vex, and are soon joined by other Vanguard members. They are unaware of Osiris, watching these events from afar before departing. In the aftermath, Saint believes they have entered a new era of peace between humanity and Eliksni due to their combined efforts. Meanwhile, Ikora finds that Lakshmi was killed and most of the Future War Cult members scattered, and that Dead Orbit and New Monarchy have left Earth, dismantling the factions within the Tower and the Last City. She also worries that Osiris is still missing, and that he need only reveal himself to clear his name from Lakshmi's implications. A joint memorial is established in the Tower's main courtyard to honor both the human and Eliksni lives lost to the Vex incursion.

During the course of these events, lore pages reveal that Savathûn has been able to possess some of the minds of the residents of the Last City, preparing them as sleeper agents for the Worm.

=== Season of the Lost ===
Following the Vex incursion of the Last City and defending the Eliksni from the Vex, Osiris' role in Lakshmi's rebellion is brought into question, and Ikora orders for his arrest. Learning that Osiris may be hiding in the Dreaming City, Saint-14, Crow, and the Guardian go to retrieve him, with Crow helping them navigate through the Ascendant Realm to bypass Scorn, Hive, and Taken forces. They find Osiris in the presence of Mara Sov, Queen of the Awoken people, who had returned to the Dreaming City after failing to stop the arrival of the Black Fleet. She at first is surprised to see Crow, but then realizes that he has become a Guardian and has no memories from being her brother Uldren who she thought was dead. Osiris taunts how Crow has been treated by the Vanguard before revealing that he has actually been Savathûn ever since the Guardian appeared to rescue him from the Moon. Savathûn, now held prisoner in a giant crystal cocoon by Mara, assures the real Osiris is safe, having rescued him from her sister, Xivu Arath. Savathûn took his form to influence and guide the Vanguard since they "rescued" him. Now, the Witch Queen is being threatened by the God of War, with the Taken, Hive, Scorn, and Wrathborn now under her command to seize the Ascendant Realm. The two queens have come to an understanding; Savathûn has helped Mara to learn of the location of several of her Techeuns trapped in the Ascendant Realm, and by tracking ley lines in the Realm using the Wayfinder's Compass to rescue them, they can help Mara protect Savathûn from Xivu Arath until they rescue enough of her Techeuns to free the Witch Queen of her worm. Saint and Ikora are wary of this deal, given that Savathûn is known for her lies and trickery, but the Vanguard agree to help with freeing the trapped Techeuns for Mara, even if this helps Xivu Arath's own forces locate weak spots within the Ascendant Realm.

Crow, also concerned about the deal, is more upset about the deception behind Osiris, whom he considered a good friend, and demands to seek answers from Savathûn, but Mara and her Queen's Wrath, Petra Venj, order him to stay far away from the Witch Queen, feeling that he would be deceived again, as he was in his previous life as Uldren by Riven. Mara also holds some contempt for how the Vanguard has treated Crow, recognizing a glimmer of Uldren's personality within him, and urges the Guardians to help protect him. To aid in their battles with Xivu Arath's forces, Mara helps the Guardian relocate Ager's Scepter, a weapon created for Uldren from the same materials as the Compass but hidden away by him before he had become Crow. Eventually, Crow finally gains an audience with Savathûn, who ultimately reveals to him his previous life as Uldren Sov. Traumatized by this revelation, Crow begs Ikora to reassign him elsewhere in order to stay far away from the Witch Queen. The Guardian eventually rescues enough of Mara's Techeuns to begin the ritual to expunge Savathûn' worm, but it is a process that will take time, and Mara fears that Xivu Arath will use that time to gather her forces and strike at the critical juncture of the ritual.

At the conclusion of the season, Mara informs the Guardian that preparations are complete for the ritual to exorcise Savathûn's worm. The Guardian returns to the Dreaming City and fights through Xivu Arath's forces alongside Petra Venj and the Corsairs to reach the ritual site, where Mara, her Techeuns, as well as Saint-14 have gathered together with the entrapped Savathûn. As Mara and the Techeuns perform the exorcism ritual, the Guardian and Saint fend off the last of Xivu Arath's forces. Savathûn's cocoon breaks open at the end of the ritual, revealing an unconscious Osiris, but Savathûn herself flees using her own magic the moment her cocoon shattered, thanking Mara and the Guardian for freeing her. The Guardian then debriefs with Mara, who is disappointed that Savathûn had fled before she could strike her down after exorcising the worm, but also relieved that the Witch Queen kept her end of the bargain by returning Osiris to the Vanguard, and also reveals she has the Worm captive. She advises the Guardian to prepare for the battles to come with the Witch Queen. The Guardian then speaks with Saint, who thanks them for rescuing Osiris and returning him to the Tower, while also furious that the Witch Queen had taken his form to manipulate the Vanguard. Saint advises the Guardian that he will need time to help with Osiris' recovery, and swears vengeance against Savathûn for her actions and deception.

The events of Destiny 2: The Witch Queen follow.

== Development and release ==
Unveiled on June 9, 2020, Beyond Light was originally scheduled for release on September 22, 2020; however, due to issues with development related to the COVID-19 pandemic, its launch was delayed to November 10. In addition to beginning Year 4 of Destiny 2's life cycle, Bungie described this release as the start of a new era for the franchise, as Beyond Light began a narrative where players "explore the true nature of Light and Dark"—Beyond Light was followed up by The Witch Queen, which itself was delayed to early 2022, Lightfall in early 2023, and then the final expansion of Destiny's first saga, The Final Shape, in mid-2024; Lightfall was originally to conclude the first saga but Bungie felt they needed one further expansion to wrap up the first saga and originally intended The Final Shape for early 2024 but it too got delayed. The expansion is available as paid downloadable content (DLC) and there was also a physical collector's edition and a digital deluxe edition, both of which, among other things, included the season passes for all four seasons of Year 4. Seasonal content for Year 4 also changed. During Year 3, seasonal content was only accessible during the season it was active. While season passes were still available à la carte as they were during Year 3, the content of previous seasons in Year 4 could be experienced all year, regardless of when a player began playing, much like the seasons during Year 2 of Forsaken's Annual Pass, though the player had to still purchase each season's seasonal pass to access the content. Some seasonal triumphs, however, could only be completed during their respective season. Bungie also stated that the narrative across each season would be more interconnected instead of being cut into individual seasonal arcs. The expansion's first seasonal content, Season of the Hunt, began on November 10 alongside Beyond Light's release and concluded on February 9, 2021. Season of the Chosen then began and concluded on May 11. Season of the Splicer ran from then through August 24, 2021. Season of the Lost then began and ran until February 22, 2022, when The Witch Queen released, thus being the longest season in Destiny 2 thus far, lasting six months.

While most seasonal content was removed from the game with the release of The Witch Queen, the Battlegrounds activity from Season of the Chosen was converted alongside the existing strikes into a new Vanguard Operations playlist with the new expansion.

With the release of The Final Shape expansion on June 4, 2024, the Beyond Light campaign was made free to play for all players, including access to the Stasis subclass. The rest of the expansion's content, such as the raid and exotic arsenal, were repackaged as the Beyond Light Pack.

=== Core client changes ===
Destiny 2's size over its first three years had grown too large for Bungie to efficiently update and maintain, creating several software bugs when they introduced new content. The total content had reached about 115 GB and often required large patches with some updates. Rather than focus on developing a Destiny 3, Bungie decided to work on refreshing the current Destiny 2 content and address the state of the game with Beyond Light. Alongside Beyond Light, Bungie introduced the "Destiny Content Vault" (DCV) as part of this major reworking of the game. Five of the game's previous main destinations (Titan, Io, Mars, Mercury, and the Leviathan area) were removed from the game and placed in the DCV along with certain activities, including the campaigns, raids, weapons, armor, and items associated with those destinations. The DCV also includes all of the content from the original Destiny game. After Beyond Light, Bungie stated plans to go back to areas in the DCV and remaster them over time so that they could be better incorporated into the game at a later time (as seen with Earth's Moon location in the previous Shadowkeep expansion). Because of this change, the install size of the game dropped by about 30 to 40% on all platforms, but did require players to effectively reinstall the full game upon Beyond Light's release. The vaulting of content also aided Bungie to release updates for content and patches much faster, as their development process became more manageable and the size of the updates much smaller to distribute.

Bungie announced in February 2021 that the planned November 2021 release of the next major expansion, The Witch Queen, was pushed back to early 2022, with Lightfall pushed back to early 2023, as Bungie said they wanted to shift to doing big releases in the spring instead of the fall. In addition to ongoing issues with the COVID-19 pandemic, Bungie felt it was necessary to spend the time on the core client to both conclude the Light and Darkness Saga that was originally to conclude with Lightfall. It was also announced that the Light and Darkness Saga was only the first saga in the Destiny franchise, with a new saga to begin after one final chapter that released after Lightfall, titled The Final Shape.

Cross-platform play between all supported platforms was formally added on the launch of Season 15. To prepare for cross-play, some changes were made to weapons on the PC version of the game as a means of handicapping the intrinsic advantage of keyboard-and-mouse over console controllers, notably increasing the amount of recoil in many gun types. In updates to Season of the Splicer (Season 14) in May 2021, Bungie inadvertently enabled cross-platform play between PC and Stadia players, a measure they removed a few days later but considered this a preview of the cross-play functionality. An official cross-play beta test ran in late May 2021, with a special in-game Strike playlist that allowed players to test this functionality.

=== Narrative changes ===
Beyond Light features a major shift in the way that Destiny 2 presented story content to players. Earlier seasons and expansions would simply have content tied to the completion of missions or connected to in-game lore, so that players would have received a bit of story content at the start of a new expansion or season and then wait until the next expansion or season for more. Starting in Season of Arrivals from Shadowkeep, the Bungie narrative team looked to make a more serialized approach where the stories would be more upfront to players and would be spread out over six to eight weeks similar to a serialized television show, which gave the team more room to include additional characters and facets that they had within the Destiny universe, according to senior narrative lead Julia Nardin. They also made sure that each season's story had a complete self-contained plot, but one that fit into the larger narrative arc they were crafting. This was one reason why Savathûn was revealed at the very start of the final Beyond Light season, Season of the Lost, since she was also the central figure planned for the next expansion, The Witch Queen, according to Nardin. Nardin said "We knew that we wanted to give the player face time with her ... That [allowed] the player to emotionally invest in something or in someone, and that automatically [raised] the stakes for the expansion. We [wanted] people to go into that with mixed feelings, and not feel 100% sure that what [they were] doing [was] the right thing".

=== Voice acting ===
During development of the mission "Stealing Stasis", scheduling difficulties caused by the COVID-19 pandemic prevented Todd Haberkorn, the voice of the Drifter, from recording the planned dialogue. Bungie rewrote the mission so that Ghost would impersonate the Drifter instead. The first impression made by Ghost's voice actor Nolan North was reportedly so accurate that he was directed to perform it less convincingly so that it would sound like Ghost attempting an imitation.

== Reception ==
Reception

Aggregate score
Aggregator	Score
Metacritic	PC: 73/100; PS4: 76/100; PS5: 77/100; XONE: 73/100; XSX: 71/100

Review scores
Publication	Score
Destructoid	6.5/10
Game Informer	7.75/10
GameSpot	8/10
IGN	7/10
PC Gamer (US)	80/100
PCGamesN	8/10

Destiny 2: Beyond Light received "mixed to average" to "generally favorable" reviews, according to review aggregator Metacritic.

While praising the new Stasis powers as being fun to use, Game Informer felt the content added wasn't enough to make up for the vaulted activities and planets, "Europa is a beautiful new location to uncover... but in a game about ever-expanding horizons, it's strange to suddenly have fewer places to play out missions. Europa is forced to bear too much weight as a gameplay and mission destination, without the relief of more alternate locations". Polygon liked the customizability of stasis, writing that it allowed for more player freedom than previous powers, "when you dive into the power's unique customization menu, its potential becomes clear. Unlike the familiar powers that launched with Destiny, the Stasis abilities aren't binary. I can slot in different “Aspects” to give myself wild new capabilities". PCGamesN enjoyed the writing and characters of the campaign, "After years of slow and uneven progress, Destiny's cast are finally acting like people. They take contrary positions and argue about them. They shout not just at unambiguously evil cosmic monsters, but at other people, much like them, who've arrived at different but understandable opinions". GameSpot praised the new location of Europa, saying it was "an impressive new offering. It's a big location with varied environments to explore, including frozen wastes, ravaged ruins, a Fallen city, and huge sci-fi facilities. The destination adds dynamic weather for the first time, and while it's not a drastic change, a blizzard whipping up in the middle of a firefight to kill visibility forces you to change how you play just enough to give Europa a dangerous and shifting feel".

PC Gamer liked how the expansion resolved long-running plot threads, "Destiny is usually very good at throwing plot beats into the air and letting them hang indefinitely, so the chance of even limited resolution feels.... exciting, and gives the plot a sense of momentum and purpose". IGN disliked the removal of older content, but felt the new raid was excellent, saying "With role-based puzzles that require intricate teamwork and communication, a pulse-pounding soundtrack full of bangers, and some truly memorable surprises, this raid isn't one to miss even for those who might normally be raid-averse". Destructoid remarked that the title mostly felt the same despite the new additions, and disliked the montentization baked into it, "After finishing the intro for Beyond Light's campaign, I was met with a gross “upgrade now!” stinger screen, asking me to pay for the deluxe edition and the season pass: this is for a $40 premium expansion with microtransactions. It is possible to do games as a service right, but sometimes, studios can overstep. I'm not really sure what their angle is anymore". Kotaku felt that many locations were left behind due to weapon sunsetting, "Play Forsaken or Shadowkeep now and you'll only win obsolete gear (though both expansions currently still cost money). The Moon, last year's big addition to Destiny 2, now feels like an afterthought. Why was one of the first Destiny's most memorable settings brought back only to once again languish as a loot backwater so soon?".
