= Destiny 2: Lightfall =

2023 expansion of Destiny 2

- Cover art, featuring a Warlock wielding Strand with the Witness, Emperor Calus, and the city of Neomuna in the background
- Developer: Bungie
- Publisher: Bungie
- Director: Joe Blackburn
- Composers: Michael Salvatori; Skye Lewin; Josh Mosser; Michael Sechrist; Rotem Moav; Pieter Schlosser
- Series: Destiny
- Platforms: PlayStation 4; PlayStation 5; Windows; Xbox One; Xbox Series X/S
- Release: February 28, 2023
- Genres: Action role-playing, first-person shooter
- Mode: Multiplayer

Destiny 2: Lightfall is a major expansion for Destiny 2, a first-person shooter video game by Bungie. Representing the seventh expansion and the sixth year of extended content for Destiny 2, it was released on February 28, 2023, after being pushed back from its original fall 2022 release as a result of the delay of the previous expansion, The Witch Queen. Lightfall revolves around the exiled Cabal emperor Calus, a recurring character throughout Destiny 2, now a Disciple of the Witness, as he, the Witness, and their army of Shadow Legion Cabal and Tormentors attack the secret, technologically advanced human city of Neomuna on Neptune to procure a mysterious being called the Veil to herald a second Collapse.

The expansion added a second Darkness subclass for players called Strand, with powers based on unraveling, suspending, and severing opponents via manipulation of reality through an extra-dimensional matrix called the Weave. Other content includes new missions, Player versus Environment locations, a Player versus Player map, player gear, weaponry, and a new raid. Two new dungeons as well as a returning reprised raid, "Crota's End" from the original Destiny's (2014) The Dark Below expansion, were released over the course of the year.

There were also four seasonal content offerings released throughout Year 6 of the game: Season of Defiance, which was available alongside the expansion, Season of the Deep in May 2023, Season of the Witch in August 2023, and Season of the Wish in November 2023, which was Destiny 2's longest traditional season ever, lasting nearly seven months (27 weeks) due to the delay of the next expansion, The Final Shape, to June 2024. Due to the lengthened time, a free content update was released in April 2024 called Into the Light, which added a new three-player PvE activity called Onslaught, new PvP maps, the return of two previously removed exotic missions and weapons with new perks, as well as a boss rush mode featuring bosses from various raids. This was also the final content year for Destiny 2 to use the seasonal model that had been utilized since Year 2, as the seasons were replaced by larger episodes in Year 7. With the release of The Final Shape, Year 6's seasonal content was removed from the game with the exception of the Onslaught activity, PvP maps, and exotic missions and gear that were added with Into the Light; Onslaught received its own dedicated playlist. Onslaught was briefly removed when The Edge of Fate launched in July 2025, but it was re-added in the second week, along with the Savathûn's Spire and The Coil activities from Season of the Witch and Season of the Wish, respectively.

The seasons bridged the events of Lightfall to the next expansion, The Final Shape. Following the end of Lightfall's campaign, Season of Defiance focused on Earth's defense after The Witness's initial assault, with the Guardian teaming up with Queen Mara Sov, Devrim Kay, and Crow to rescue abducted citizens from the Shadow Legion's prisons using the Ascendant Realm. Season of the Deep had the Guardian work with The Drifter to travel back to Saturn's moon, Titan, which had returned after its disappearance by the Darkness at the end of Season of Arrivals, with the Guardian sent to rescue Deputy Commander Sloane, who survived the Darkness by forging a psychic bond with an ancient proto-Hive creature named Ahsa, who revealed the origins of The Witness. Season of the Witch then saw the Vanguard resurrect Savathûn to learn how to pursue The Witness into the portal it created on the Traveler's surface at the end of Lightfall. In Season of the Wish, the Vanguard struck a bargain with the spirit of the Ahamkara dragon, Riven (who was slain in the "Last Wish" raid in Forsaken), in order for her to grant a 15th and final wish to allow Crow to enter the Traveler and pave the way to confront The Witness in The Final Shape. In Into the Light, which was a prologue to The Final Shape, the Guardian worked with Lord Shaxx to fight back against The Witness's forces that encroached upon the Last City.

== Gameplay ==
Lightfall expands on the base Destiny 2 gameplay by adding a new free roam world for the city Neomuna on the planet Neptune. Over the course of the year of content for Lightfall included one new raid, "Root of Nightmares", released on March 10, 2023, two new dungeons, "Ghosts of the Deep" and "Warlord's Ruin" during Seasons 21 and 23, respectively, and one returning raid, "Crota's End", from the original Destiny's (2014) The Dark Below expansion, which was added on September 1, 2023, during Season 22 and is free for all players to access. It features the same story as the original, but accounts for differences in Destiny 2, such as gameplay mechanics and Champion enemies, as well as a new starting instance on the Hellmouth on Earth's Moon (players begin the raid in the Hellmouth area like the original, but cannot explore the rest of the Moon beyond this area). New and existing story content was expanded with a "Legendary" difficulty similar to that from The Witch Queen (2022), designed to be challenging for single players but with improved rewards for completing. Starting with Lightfall and future expansions, previous expansions and their content is no longer removed from the game and placed in the Destiny Content Vault (DCV), but seasonal content will still continue to be removed and vaulted at the start of each expansion. While the other seasonal activities from The Witch Queen were removed with Lightfall, the PsiOps and Heist Battlegrounds activities from Season of the Risen (Season 16) and Season of the Seraph (Season 19), respectively, were added to the Vanguard Ops playlist, and, alongside the Battlegrounds from Season of the Chosen (Season 13), were also made available as Nightfalls and Grandmaster Nightfalls.

Emperor Calus's Shadow Legion, Cabal warriors that carry the power of the Darkness, and Tormentors, the personal soldiers of the Witness, are new major enemies within Lightfall. Cabal Shadow Legion enemies use Pyramid technology to shield themselves in battle. Described by Bungie as the "most scary unit [players] have ever fought", Tormentors use giant scythes in battle and can suppress Guardian ability and super usage and even instantly kill Guardians by grabbing them at close range.

Beyond Light (2020) introduced the game's first Darkness subclass, Stasis, which used items called Aspects and Fragments to give the player more customization of how Stasis could be used; during The Witch Queen, the original Light subclasses of Void, Solar, and Arc were revamped to be given the same Aspect and Fragment system as Stasis. Lightfall added a brand new, second Darkness subclass called Strand, which also features this modularity. Strand's powers are based on unraveling, suspending, and severing opponents via manipulation of reality through an extra-dimensional matrix called the Weave. One such power is a grappling hook-like ability that allows Guardians to grapple onto environmental features or other characters, enabling new forms of movement. Each of the main character classes gain a new subclass based on Strand: Berserkers for Titans, who can use twin Strand blades to quickly slice through enemies through their "Bladefury" super; Broodweavers for Warlocks, who can unleash Strand missiles which explode into creatures called Threadlings upon impact through their "Needlestorm" super; and Threadrunners for Hunters, who can summon a Strand rope dart to lash enemies with through their "Silkstrike" super.

Across the board, Lightfall introduced adjustments to game difficulty levels for endgame content (e.g., Nightfalls and raids) and based on Bungie's monitoring of activities to date. Rather than setting and capping these activities at a given level, higher-difficulty activities became only available to players above certain Power levels. Further, Guardians' Power level was given a penalty based on the difficulty level, making them more vulnerable and less damaging to enemies. Accompanying these changes included an improved system of rewards to make the challenging content more worthwhile to complete. Elemental burns, which were originally fixed based on the activity, were split into season-long and weekly rotating surges (increases for Guardians' damage) and threats (increases for enemy damage). Special overcharged weapons granted additional damage during periods where its element was surging.

Among gameplay improvements, Lightfall added an in-game loadout feature, which previously were performed through third-party applications that interfaced with Destiny 2. This allows players to set pre-determined armor and weapon sets, including all mods and appearance modifiers, making it easy to switch between various loadouts for various activities. During Season 23, Lightfall introduced an improved in-game "looking for group" (LFG) feature which allows players to easily find other players to engage with content that is designed for matchmaking; the beta for the in-game fireteam finder feature began on November 30, 2023, with its full release in January 2024. A commendation system was also introduced to allow players to provide positive recognition and accolades to other players after an activity has been completed. These new features were layered atop a new Guardian level system which was designed to reflect how much expertise a player had with Destiny 2, and also serves as a new player onboarding system, with some features locked out until the player has reached a specific Guardian level.

Other significant gameplay changes included:

- The seasonal artifact, which provides bonus power levels across all characters on a player's account for a season as introduced in Shadowkeep, continued to be used in Lightfall. However, mods on the seasonal artifact were replaced with unique, unlockable perks which only 12 could be active per character, and these perks were applied passively when active; moreover, resetting the artifact to change perks was free. Starting in Season 21, perks on the seasonal artifact could be activated and deactivated individually instead of having to reset the entire artifact to change perks.
- In addition to the in-game loadout feature, a mod customization feature was added, which allows players to view and modify all weapon and armor mods and character stats on a single screen. Furthermore, armor and its armor mods no longer have elemental affinities, with some armor mods now providing benefits to weapons based on their damage type, and the general energy cost of mods was reduced to encourage more experimentation in buildcrafting. As well, the Charged With Light combat style mods was replaced with an Armor Charge system, while Elemental Wells were replaced with those of damage-type-specific spawned objects, such as Stasis shards and Arc ionic traces.
- The Match Game modifier was removed from high-difficulty endgame activities such as Grandmaster Nightfalls and Master-level raids, with base elemental shield resistance to non-matching elemental damage being adjusted as a result. As well, in addition to anti-Champion weapon perks that could be unlocked on the seasonal artifact, each subclass' elemental status effects could be used to stun Champions (Void volatile, Solar radiant, and Strand unravel stuns Barrier Champions; Arc jolt, Void suppression, and Stasis slow stuns Overload Champions; and Arc blind, Stasis shatter, Solar ignition, and Strand suspend stuns Unstoppable Champions).
- Ada-1, who served as the vendor for armor transmogrification for players since Season 14, began selling shaders offered from the first three years of Destiny 2 starting in Season 20, with three shaders featured for purchase every week. As well, legacy weapons and gear focusing was introduced for strikes and Nightfalls, Crucible, Gambit, Trials of Osiris, and Iron Banner, with each vendor (Commander Zavala, Lord Shaxx, the Drifter, Saint-14, and Lord Saladin, respectively) providing a selection of weapons and gear that were released in previous seasons and expansions. Umbral engrams, which were reintroduced in Season 13 and were used to focus seasonal weapons and gear at the H.E.L.M., as well as seasonal Umbral energies, were removed in Season 20 in favor of the weapon and gear focusing system used by the ritual vendors in the Tower.
- Weapon crafting, which was introduced in The Witch Queen, was further simplified with Lightfall. Deepsight Resonance on weapons that cannot be crafted and Resonant Element crafting materials (which are obtained from either completing attunement progress on Deepsight Resonance weapons or dismantling them) was completely removed from the game at the launch of Lightfall and Season 20, with standard currencies such as Glimmer and Enhancement Cores instead used to craft weapons, with fewer weapons that can be crafted. Resonant, Harmonic, and Ascendant Alloys continued to be used for weapon crafting but Bungie eventually removed Resonant and Harmonic Alloys during Year 6. Furthermore, midway through season 20, perks on Adept raid weapons could be upgraded into enhanced perks similar to those on crafted weapons; non-crafted weapons had the ability to have enhanced perks later in the year.
- With the addition of the PsiOps and Heist Battlegrounds activities to the Vanguard Ops playlist and Battlegrounds in general becoming available as Nightfalls and Grandmaster Nightfalls, the "Lake of Shadows" and "The Arms Dealer" strikes from the first year of Destiny 2 were reworked, while the "Exodus Crash" and "The Inverted Spire" strikes were removed from the Vanguard Ops, Nightfall, and Grandmaster Nightfall rotation in preparation for a rework of those strikes.
- Exotic gear focusing was introduced at the launch of Season 21, where any randomly dropped exotic engram could be focused into an armor piece from a previous Destiny 2 expansion or season into a specific armor piece already unlocked in the player's collection. The inventory cap for Exotic Ciphers, one of the materials used for armor focusing, was increased to 5 in order to support this new system (players were previously capped at only one Exotic Cipher on their account at a time).
- An exotic mission rotator was added in Season 22, which at first featured the "Presage", "Vox Obscura", and "Operation: Seraph's Shield" exotic missions from Seasons 13, 16, and 19, respectively. Due to this, the exotic weapons Dead Messenger and Revision Zero from the latter two were not added to the exotic archive. After the Presage mission was removed from the game, its exotic weapon, Dead Man's Tale, became purchasable from Xûr on the weekends; however, with Presage re-added with the exotic mission rotator, Xûr no longer sells the weapon with Dead Man's Tale once again becoming Presage's award. Furthermore, with the exception of Revision Zero as it was already a craftable weapon, the other exotic weapons from these exotic missions were made craftable weapons upon their entry into the exotic mission rotator. In time, Bungie plans to reintroduce past exotic missions as part of the rotator, such as "The Whisper" from Warmind (Season 3) and "Zero Hour" from Season of the Drifter (Season 6), both of which were reprised and launched with the Into the Light update in April and May 2024, respectively, with their respective exotic weapons, Whisper of the Worm and Outbreak Perfected, becoming craftable.
- Season 22 added a "Timeline Reflections" quest, allowing new, returning, and veteran players to go back and replay three major story moments from previous expansions to get players caught up on the story before The Final Shape. These included "Cayde's Fate" from Forsaken, "Communing with Stasis" from Beyond Light, and "Lucent Hive" from The Witch Queen. Cinematics about the introduction to the Destiny universe from the New Light campaign as well as the origins of the Witness from Season 21 were also added and viewable from the timeline.
- As a result of the next expansion, The Final Shape, being delayed from February 2024 to June 2024, Season 23 was extended by over three months. In turn, Bungie announced a free two-month long content update that released on April 9, 2024, called Into the Light to prepare players for The Final Shape.
- Midway through Season 23, in addition to a six-week story quest called "Riven's Wishes" and the return of Moments of Triumph, Bungie raised the Glimmer cap to 500,000 (from the original cap of 250,000 which remained unchanged since Shadowkeep), and also introduced a character customization feature at the launch of the Into the Light free update on April 9, 2024, which allows players to modify their Guardians' appearances at any time when they are in the character login screen of the game.
- The 2024 Guardian Games event, which occurred in March during Season 23, added a new vehicle, the Skimmer, which was previously only seen used by the Cloud Striders on Neomuna during Lightfall. The Skimmer is Destiny 2's version of a hoverboard which can be used in place of Sparrows to traverse across destinations. Only two were added at the time (but more have been added since), one that came from a Guardian Games event quest and another which can be purchased from the Eververse store. A trial version was available to all players during the event, which went away at the conclusion of the event unless they had completed the quest to upgrade it to the exotic version.
- The New Light campaign can now be skipped with the launch of the Into the Light free update on April 9, 2024, allowing new players to Destiny 2 to instantly play the game without going through the "A Guardian Rises" tutorial questline in the Cosmodrome. New Light Kits, which contain campaign-ready starter weapons, gear, some unlocked abilities and an exotic armor quest for a chosen Light subclass, are available via Ikora Rey in the Tower after skipping the New Light campaign.

=== Seasonal changes ===
In addition to the major story and content added with Lightfall, Bungie divided the year into four seasons. Each season offered a free-tier and paid-tier season pass to acquire new gear, game currency, and cosmetics, as well as new activities and triumphs associated with those activities, some of which required purchase of the season pass to access. Like the previous two years (Years 4 and 5), seasonal activities and story missions could still be accessed in subsequent seasons for the duration of Year 6 (some triumphs, however, could only be completed during the active season). With the exception of some content from the Into the Light update, all of the seasonal content was removed from the game upon the release of The Final Shape in June 2024.

Season of Defiance (Season 20) began with the launch of Lightfall on February 28, 2023. New and existing players' Power levels were increased to the new minimum Power level of 1600, a soft cap of 1750, with the hard Power level cap set to 1800, and the Pinnacle reward cap at 1810. The season's story ran concurrent with the Lightfall story, where the Guardian teamed up with Mara Sov, Devrim Kay, Mithrax, Amanda Holliday, and Crow to help rescue civilians who had been taken hostage and imprisoned by the Cabal Shadow Legion introduced in the Lightfall campaign. The season added the "Defiant Battlegrounds" activity, in which the player infiltrated Pyramid strongholds within Earth's European Dead Zone (EDZ) and Cosmodrome and the Ascendant Realm to rescue civilians from the Shadow Legion and Taken. Completing the activity rewarded seasonal weapons and gear with the help of a revamped War Table in the H.E.L.M. The season also introduced an exotic quest called "//node.ovrd.AVALON//" (or Avalon for short) which rewarded a new craftable exotic glaive, the Vexcalibur. The seasonal artifact featured during this season was the Ascendant Scepter (with perks focusing on mid- to long-range weapons and Void, Solar, and Strand abilities).

During this season, Lance Reddick, the voice actor for Commander Zavala, died on March 17, 2023. In addition to a tribute message to Reddick's friends and family, Bungie stated that Reddick had voiced many of Zavala's lines in advance and that there would still be more to come from the character, with Keith David taking over the role in The Final Shape.

Season of the Deep (Season 21) began on May 23, 2023; unlike previous seasons, there was not an increase to the hard Power level cap or to the Pinnacle reward cap (they remained at 1800 and 1810, respectively), and the upgrade system for the seasonal vendors in the H.E.L.M. was removed. The season featured the return of Deputy Commander Sloane and Saturn's moon Titan (which had been removed from the game upon the release of Beyond Light), as the Guardian teamed up with her and the Drifter to eradicate the Taken and Hive festering at the bottom of Titan's methane ocean and to uncover secrets about the Witness's origins through a massive undersea creature named Ahsa. Titan could only be accessed via the seasonal activities and was not a free roam patrol destination. The season added the "Salvage" activity, in which a six-player fireteam salvaged Golden Age tech from Titan's seafloor while fighting against Taken, Hive, and Wrathborn forces; the "Deep Dives" activity, where a fireteam of up to three players explored deep in the ocean to salvage Egregore needed to obtain intel about the Witness from Ahsa; as well as fishing, where players could catch fish in dedicated areas in the EDZ, Nessus, and Savathûn's Throne World that could be released for display in an aquarium in the H.E.L.M. After catching three unique exotic fish (one at each destination), a secret exotic quest called "The Whetstone", hidden in the Deep Dives activity, could be unlocked, which rewarded players with a new exotic scout rifle, Wicked Implement. The season also featured a continuation of the Lightfall campaign, which rewarded a brand new hand cannon and a new Strand Aspect for each of the character classes upon completion. A new dungeon, "Ghosts of the Deep", was released on May 26, 2023, taking place deep underwater beneath the New Pacific Arcology ruins on Titan. In addition to brand new weapons, including those reprised from Gambit Prime from Season of the Drifter (Season 5), the weapons from the "Last Wish" raid from Forsaken were updated with new perks and cab be crafted at the Mars Relic. The seasonal artifact featured during this season was the NPA Repulsor Regulator (with perks focusing on close- to mid-range weapons and Arc, Void, and Strand abilities).

Season of the Witch (Season 22) began on August 22, 2023. Like Season 21, there was no increase to the hard Power level cap or to the Pinnacle reward cap. The season featured the Guardian teaming up with Eris Morn, Ikora Rey, and Savathûn's Ghost, Immaru, to resurrect the Witch Queen herself in order to find a way through the portal on the Traveler's surface, as well as wielding Hive magic to tithe deaths to Eris herself, who had transformed into a Hive god, in order to push back Xivu Arath. The season added the "Savathûn's Spire" activity, in which a three-player fireteam ascended the titular spire in Savathûn's Throne World and defeated enemies inside to power Eris's ritual; and the "Altars of Summoning" activity also in the Throne World, in which a three-player fireteam faced random waves of differing enemies and tithing their deaths to Eris. Midway through the season, a solo activity called "The Imbaru Engine" was added and took place within the Altars of Summoning area where the player completed puzzles created by Savathûn to learn more about her powers of subterfuge and trickery. Completing these activities rewarded seasonal weapons, gear, and enhancements through the Deck of Whispers and the Ritual Table in the H.E.L.M. The 12 major arcana cards in the Deck of Whispers provided unique buffs that could be used in both the Savathûn's Spire and Altars of Summoning activities; a minimum of five major arcana cards had to be unlocked and activated for the Deck of Whispers to be used in those activities, and only one major arcana card was drawn at random at the start of each of the activities' encounters. The season also saw the return of the "Crota's End" raid from the original Destiny's first expansion, The Dark Below, which was released on September 1, 2023. A new Crucible map, Multiplex, was added, taking place in the Vex Network, as well as a new mode called Relic, which is a 6v6 mode where players use relics from past raids and seasonal activities to defeat opponents, including the Aegis Shield from the Vault of Glass raid, the Synaptic Spear from Season of the Risen, and the Nightmare Slayer Scythe from Season of the Haunted. The seasonal artifact featured during this season was the Acolyte Staff (with perks focusing on mid to long-range weapons and Arc, Solar, Void, and Strand abilities).

Season of the Wish (Season 23) began on November 28, 2023, and as with the prior two seasons, there was no increase to the Power level cap or Pinnacle reward cap. The season featured the return of the Ahamkara wish dragon Riven of a Thousand Voices (who was the final boss from the "Last Wish" raid from Forsaken) as the Guardian teamed up with Mara Sov, Petra Venj, and Crow to fulfill a previously speculated 15th and final wish (from the Wish Wall in the Last Wish raid) through Riven's spirit in order to follow the Witness through the portal on the Traveler, serving as a prelude to The Final Shape. The season added the "Riven's Lair" and "The Coil" activities, in which a three-player fireteam explored a labyrinth deep beneath the Dreaming City to defeat Scorn, Vex, and Taken enemies within to search for Riven's missing Ahamkara eggs. A new dungeon, "Warlord's Ruin", was released on December 1, 2023, taking place in an abandoned Dark Age castle nestled in the mountains of the EDZ. An exotic quest, "Starcrossed", which took place in the Black Garden and rewarded players with a new craftable Strand exotic bow, the Wish-Keeper, was added on December 19, 2023. The seasonal artifact featured during this season was the Queensfoil Censer (with perks focusing on close to mid-range weapons and Solar, Stasis, and Strand abilities).

Due to the delay in the release of The Final Shape until June 4, 2024, this season was extended until its release, lasting nearly seven months (27 weeks), making it the longest season in Destiny 2's history. A six-week story quest called "Riven's Wishes" was released on January 30, 2024, and allowed players to obtain a weekly quest from Mara Sov in which the player completed a high-level activity in the Dreaming City, such as a Lost Sector or the Blind Well public activity, and this rewarded wish tokens that could be redeemed for items such as weapons from the Last Wish raid to obtain weapon patterns for crafting, exotic armor pieces released over the prior year (which previously only came from the featured daily Lost Sector or the Vex Strike Force public event on Neomuna), as well as other miscellanea such as Ascendant Shards and Alloys and Exotic Ciphers. Beginning with the second half of the season on March 5, 2024, there was also major overhaul to PvP, including adjustments to player spawn points, heavy ammo crates and tiebreaker zone locations on certain maps, a rework of the special ammo economy, new rewards such as artifice armor (armor with an extra mod slot originally rewarded in Master-level dungeons) for competitive Crucible game modes for players ranked Gold III or higher, a new 3v3 competitive king-of-the-hill game mode called Collision (players capture and control a single large zone that rotates between five points around the map on a timer), and a new Passage of Persistence card for Trials of Osiris, which allows players to obtain the weekly Trials Adept weapon without having to go flawless.

The free Into the Light update was released on April 9, 2024, and featured Guardians teaming up with Lord Shaxx and his Redjacks as the Black Fleet and the forces of the Witness attacked the Last City to prevent the Guardian and the Vanguard from entering the portal on the Traveler's surface, serving as an official prologue to The Final Shape. Into the Light featured a new tower defense horde mode called "Onslaught", where a three-player fireteam defended sectors of the Last City from the Witness's forces. In Onslaught, players defended a device called the Active Defense Unit (ADU) against up to 50 waves of enemies of increasing difficulty, with every 10th wave featuring a boss inside a Pyramid ship. In between waves, players could use a currency called scrap (obtained by defeating enemies during each wave) to build up defenses such as tripwires, turrets, and decoys, as well as finding batteries to repair the ADU. The matchmade playlist version of Onslaught only featured ten waves of enemies, while the higher non-matchmade difficulties featured the full 50 waves. The update also featured 12 reissued weapons—branded as BRAVE weapons—from earlier seasons and expansions and from the original Destiny which had a chance to drop with extra perks and an exclusive ornament, as well as a brand new social space in the Tower called the Hall of Champions, where players could increase the drop rates for any of the 12 reissued weapons, as well as earn new rewards. Three new Crucible maps—Eventide Labs on Europa, Cirrus Plaza on Neomuna, and Dissonance in the Witness's Pyramid mothership—were released on May 7 as part of the update. A limited-time boss rush PvE endgame mode called "Pantheon" was released on April 30, 2024, which featured battles with raid bosses with increasing difficulty and rewards. Much of this content was removed upon the release of The Final Shape. The Into the Light content that remained in the game after The Final Shape's release included the Onslaught activity, which received its own dedicated playlist under Vanguard Operations, the BRAVE weapons, The Whisper and Zero Hour exotic missions, the PvP maps, as well as the Parade armor set and shaders.

== Plot ==
Lightfall takes place in the aftermath of the Black Fleet's return and the Witness's renewed assault on the solar system. Humanity discovers Neomuna, a hidden cyberpunk city on Neptune populated by the Neomuni-humans who escaped the Collapse but lack the Traveler's Light. They are protected by cybernetically enhanced warriors called Cloud Striders and sustained by a digital city network called the Cloud Ark, which is tied to a mysterious paracausal force known as the Veil.

The Witness launches an attack on Earth while directing Emperor Calus and his Shadow Legion to Neptune to seize the Veil. The Guardian and Osiris pursue them to Neomuna, where they ally with the Cloud Striders Rohan and Nimbus. There, the Guardian discovers a new Darkness power called Strand, which they learn to wield while resisting Calus's invasion and attempts to link the Veil and the Traveler using the Radial Mast.

Lightfall begins shortly after the events of Season of the Seraph. The Vanguard faces heavy resistance against the Black Fleet as they arrive in Earth's orbit to attack the Traveler as Commander Zavala, Ikora Rey, Osiris, Mara Sov, and Elsie Bray (the Exo Stranger) watch on from the H.E.L.M. The Witness emerges from its Pyramid and effortlessly destroys most of the Vanguard forces as the Traveler attacks the Black Fleet with a beam of Light, only for it to be suppressed by Pyramids that begin to surround it. The Witness then attempts to commune with the Traveler, who grants it a vision of the Veil on Neptune, and orders Emperor Calus and his loyal Cabal forces, called the Shadow Legion, and the Witness's personal soldiers, the Tormentors, to travel to Neptune to retrieve it. Osiris then decides to go after Calus and the Shadow Legion, fearing that the Witness has located the Veil on Neptune. The Guardian is sent by Ikora to watch after him, as the loss of his Ghost Sagira (who sacrificed herself before the events of Season of the Hunt) makes him vulnerable to a final death.

Osiris and the Guardian arrive in Neomuna where they are greeted by the senior Cloud Strider, Rohan, and his apprentice Nimbus, who gives the Guardian an Awoken artifact, the Ascendant Scepter, on behalf of Mara Sov to aid them in the battles to come. Calus' Black Fleet flagship, the Typhon Imperator, has already arrived and laid siege to Neomuna, and the Neomuni had gone into cryonic stasis and their consciousness uploaded into the CloudArk, Neomuna's cloud computer and city infrastructure and defense network that is powered by the Veil. As they venture through the city fighting the Shadow Legion, the Guardian discovers threads of Darkness energy throughout the city, which Osiris dubs "Strand", which they are able to use to great effect against Calus' loyalists but at considerable cost to themself. Suddenly possessing the Guardian's Ghost, the Witness commands Calus to set up the Radial Mast, an artifact of primordial Light which will create an uplink between the Veil and the Traveler and allow the Witness to create what it calls the "Final Shape". The Guardian enters the Typhon Imperator to attempt to destroy the Radial Mast before it can be activated, but Empress Caiatl, Calus' estranged daughter, brings her forces in so as to allow the Guardian to escape after their usage of Strand makes them exhausted. As the plan to destroy the Radial Mast in Calus' flagship suffered a setback, the Guardian then assists Rohan and Nimbus in reactivating the CloudArk in order to further protect the Veil, while eliminating local Vex forces that are siphoning power from the CloudArk.

Osiris and Rohan soon discover that the Shadow Legion are taking the Radial Mast directly to the vault containing the Veil. Feeling confident that the Guardian has mastered Strand, Osiris sends the Guardian to go after Calus' forces to the vault, where Rohan attempts to delay the Radial Mast from being activated. The Guardian is then unable to use Strand further after eliminating the Shadow Legion forces, leading Rohan to ultimately sacrifice himself to destroy the device. Soon after, the Witness demands Calus to go directly to the Veil to perform the uplink due to the Radial Mast's destruction. Osiris then guides the Guardian to further properly use Strand without leaving themselves vulnerable, believing it would be the edge they need to defeat Calus. After further honing their Strand powers, the Guardian makes their way to the vault containing the Veil, where Caiatl assists the Guardian by bringing her forces to the fight, but Calus breaches the vault and gains entry. The Guardian defeats Calus once and for all from underneath the Veil itself using their Strand powers, but the Guardian's Ghost becomes possessed again by the Witness; the Witness then uses the primordial Light from Ghost to commune with the Veil and create the uplink. With the Veil's power, the Witness opens a portal on the Traveler's surface that allows it to go inside the Traveler to an unknown location, leaving the Traveler itself in a dormant state.

The Guardian afterwards returns to the Tower, where they speak to Zavala and Ikora, who lament the loss of the Traveler to the Witness and that the war is far from over, but also express gratitude in humanity's strengthened bonds with the Awoken, Eliksni, Cabal, and now the Cloud Striders and the Neomuni. They advise the Guardian to return to Neomuna to aid the Cloud Striders and to learn what they can about the Veil and their newfound Strand powers. Upon returning to Neomuna, the Guardian joins Nimbus for a memorial service for Rohan in the city's Hall of Heroes, but Nimbus leaves the service early due to their continued grief for Rohan. The Guardian speaks to Nimbus, where they state that the better way to memorialize Rohan would be to finish the mission that he started—finding and destroying the Vex in the Black Garden that were recreating the Black Heart (which was destroyed by the Guardian at the end of the original Destiny), which Nimbus reveals it to be a failed, emulated version of the Veil. The Guardian assists Nimbus in collecting data packets from the Vex and deciphering Rohan's notes, which leads them to the Black Garden, where the Guardian and Nimbus find Rohan's missing exotic machine gun, the Deterministic Chaos. Using the late Cloud Strider's weapon, the Guardian takes down the Conceptual Mind, preventing the Vex from recreating the Black Heart, allowing Nimbus to finally grieve and honor Rohan and continue their mentor's legacy.

As the Guardian continues to work with Nimbus, Osiris, and several Neomuni allies in defending Neomuna from the Shadow Legion and Vex, they begin to receive reports that the Neomuni are being haunted by nightmares from Nezarec, Final God of Pain, a former Disciple of the Witness who led the attack on Earth alongside Savathûn and the Witness during the Collapse, believed to be dead and whose relics were gathered by the Guardian during Season of Plunder; the Guardian is also able to hear Nezarec's whispers throughout their patrols on Neomuna. A fireteam of Guardians decide to help the Neomuni put an end to Nezarec's reign of terror by eliminating the former Disciple for good from his prison in the Witness's Pyramid mothership, the Essence, that was attacked and terraformed by the Traveler's beam of Light ("Root of Nightmares" raid). The Guardians travel to the Essence near the Traveler in Earth's orbit, where they are contacted by Nezarec himself, revealed to have been unwittingly resurrected by the Traveler during its attack on the Black Fleet. The Guardians make their way through the terraformed Pyramid, where they face heavy resistance from the Shadow Legion and Tormentors in an effort to feed both Light and Darkness energies through the roots of a blooming Tree of Silver Wings into a sarcophagus containing Nezarec to awaken him. After defeating a Shadow Legion lieutenant, Zo'aurc, Explicator of Planets, the Guardians fully awaken Nezarec and engage in one final showdown against the former Disciple. After a grueling battle, the Guardians defeat Nezarec once and for all, freeing Neomuna from his evil influence.

Several weeks later after Nezarec's defeat, the Guardian is tasked by Nimbus and Osiris to investigate strange Vex activity across Neomuna. After collecting Vex data points from across the city, the Guardian discovers that the Vex were trying to access old data from the vault containing the Veil itself. The Guardian returns to the vault containing the Veil as Nimbus and Osiris mention that Savathûn had initially killed Nezarec deep in the Lunar Pyramid during the Collapse and spirited the Veil away to Neptune, where it would be later discovered by the Ishtar Collective of Venus and a vault built around it to harness its paracausal powers of Darkness and build the city of Neomuna upon it. The Guardian finds a terminal in the vault containing Vex-encrypted logs from Ishtar Collective researcher Chioma Esi—one of the founders of Neomuna alongside her partner and head researcher Maya Sundaresh—which may contain more information about the Veil. Over the next several weeks, Osiris and Nimbus gradually decrypt each of Chioma's logs, providing the Guardian more detail about Neomuna's founding and the Veil itself. The logs reveal that a team of Ishtar Collective researchers under the leadership of Maya and Chioma tried to commune with the Veil and the Darkness upon discovery but died on initial contact; against Chioma's wishes, however, Maya further experimented on the Veil which led to more casualties but ended with the creation of a single Exo, Lakshmi-2, who bore her voice, memories, and consciousness. Chioma later describes the Veil itself as a web of consciousness, but biological in nature, revealing that the Veil is a major source of Darkness and the source of Strand found throughout Neomuna.

=== Season of Defiance ===
Shortly after Emperor Calus's defeat and in the midst of the Guardian's continued efforts to assist the Cloud Striders and Neomuni in driving back the Shadow Legion and the Vex on Neptune, the Guardian receives a message from Mara Sov, who requests them to return to Earth to assist the Vanguard and their allies in the war effort against the Witness and its forces. The Guardian then meets with Mara, Devrim Kay, and Mithrax at the Farm in the EDZ (as previously featured in Destiny 2's original "Red War" campaign), who advise them that the Shadow Legion has begun to capture civilians and imprison them in their Pyramid ships in the aftermath of the Witness's attack on the Traveler; the Tower shipwright Amanda Holliday, thought to have been killed by the Witness's attack on the Traveler, is one of those captives. The Guardian then heads to the EDZ with Crow where they find one of the Pyramids where Amanda and several captives are being held; they then use the Ascendant Scepter to enter the Ascendant Realm and fight their way through Shadow Legion and Taken forces to reach the interior of the Pyramid and rescue the civilians. After a short reunion between Crow and Amanda, the Guardian returns to the H.E.L.M. where they are greeted with another message from Mara, who urges the Guardian to continue using the Scepter to traverse the Ascendant Realm for the rescue operations. Mara then speaks to the Guardian personally at the Farm shortly after they rescue more civilians from the Shadow Legion, who knights the Guardian as part of her Queensguard.

Over the next several weeks, the Vanguard continues to rescue more human and Eliksni civilians from the Shadow Legion Pyramid outposts in the EDZ, the Cosmodrome, and even in a Shadow Legion prisoner transport in Earth's atmosphere. Devrim later identifies another outpost in the EDZ, and while the Guardian, Mithrax, and Amanda head towards the site, Eramis contacts Mithrax and warns him this is a fight they cannot win. The Guardian clears a route to the prisoners and holds the Legion at bay, while Amanda operates from the control room and Mithrax leads the prisoners out. Amanda sacrifices herself to assure that Mithrax and the prisoners can escape. Outside, the Guardian and Mithrax realize Amanda did not make it, and Eramis briefly appears to taunt their loss. Zavala is devastated and Crow vows vengeance as a quiet memorial is held for Amanda at the Farm.

Eventually, Crow contacts the Guardian and advises them of the plan to enact retribution on the Shadow Legion by destroying their flagship in Earth's atmosphere. Using the Scepter and imbued with Mara's power, the Guardian, Devrim, Mithrax, and Crow traverse the Ascendant Realm and enter the Shadow Legion flagship. The Guardian destroys the ship's engines using Mara's power while Devrim, Mithrax, and Crow take down the ship's commanders, and they escape through the Ascendant Realm back to the Farm as the ship explodes in midair, their mission completed and Amanda's sacrifice honored.

Amidst the ongoing operation, the Guardian investigates Vex code fragments scattered throughout the EDZ, which leads them to a friendly Vex Harpy and an entrance to the Vex network deep within a cave ("Avalon" exotic mission). With Mithrax's guidance, the Guardian explores the Vex network, where a digitized Asher Mir (last seen during Season of Arrivals) requests their assistance and guides them through the network. The Guardian eventually reaches the heart of the Vex network, where they defeat Brakion, Repurposed Mind, and is given the exotic glaive Vexcalibur by Asher as thanks for their assistance. Eventually, the Guardian uncovers Asher's research and a manual simulation of the Veil from deep within the Vex network, revealing that Asher knew of its existence, as well as the Black Fleet and the Witness's plans for it, through his simulations of the Vex.

=== Season of the Deep ===
Following the Guardian and the Queensguard's victory over the Shadow Legion and the destruction of their flagship in Earth's atmosphere and Amanda Holliday's sacrifice, the Vanguard makes attempts to enter the portal the Witness created on the Traveler's surface to no success. During this time, Saturn's moon Titan has suddenly reappeared after being taken by the Witness two years ago at the end of Season of Arrivals, and Commander Zavala receives a distress signal from Deputy Commander Sloane, who had miraculously survived. Not wanting to lose any more allies again, Zavala requests the Guardian, Lord Saladin, and Saint-14 to travel to Titan to rescue Sloane; upon arriving at the ruins of the New Pacific Arcology, the Guardian, Saladin, and Saint are ambushed by the Taken, Hive, and Wrathborn under the command of Xivu Arath, the Hive God of War; Xivu Arath herself taunts the Guardian as they fight through her forces. Alarmed by Xivu Arath's presence on the Saturnian moon, the Guardian heads to the communications array where they triangulate Sloane's position, discovering that she is deep below the methane ocean. The Guardian attempts to dive to the seafloor to find Sloane but the crushing underwater pressure prompts the Drifter to transmat them to his ship, the Derelict, where the Guardian is outfitted with a device that would help them withstand the oceanic pressure.

Eventually, the Guardian, Zavala, and Drifter locate the source of Sloane's distress signal in a facility deep underwater, where they find Sloane herself, safe but also partially corrupted with Taken energy. Drifter tries to convince Sloane to return to the Last City, but Sloane reveals that the distress signal was not for her, but for a massive sea creature she was communing with named Ahsa, a proto-Worm God from Fundament. Sloane reveals that Ahsa knows the Witness all too well and it was also coming for her species, and that her partial Taken corruption helped allow Ahsa and Sloane to bond and communicate with each other, but also would allow Xivu Arath to whisper to her. The Guardian returns to the H.E.L.M., where Sloane advises the Guardian that due to Titan returning to the material plane, she would need to attune further with Ahsa in order to gather more intel on the Witness and its whereabouts. The Drifter also contacts the Guardian, who advises them that he found Egregore at the bottom of Titan's ocean that could be used to help Sloane attune further with Ahsa, but would also need to salvage Golden Age tech to accomplish this; the Drifter then gives the Guardian the NPA Repulsor Regulator to aid them in the battles to come.

The Guardian, equipped with a better quality diving suit, goes to the New Pacific Arcology to salvage Golden Age tech for the Drifter while fending off the Hive and Taken infesting the ruins. They then later dive deeper underwater to locate a piece of Egregore coral using an Egregore resonator that the Drifter had created using the salvaged Golden Age tech, where they fight off more of Xivu Arath's forces. After retrieving the Egregore coral from the ocean floor, the Guardian brings it to Sloane, where she absorbs its energy to commune with Ahsa; possessing Sloane, Ahsa reveals vague information regarding the Witness's origins, which leaves the former exhausted. Sloane then contacts the Guardian at the H.E.L.M., where she needs time to recover before she and Ahsa could attune again, and asks the Guardian to continue helping the Drifter upgrade his technology in order to collect more Egregore coral.

Over the next several weeks, the Guardian continues to help the Drifter upgrade his technology and gather more Egregore coral for Ahsa and Sloane to better attune with each other. After several cryptic messages, Ahsa finally speaks to the Guardian directly through Sloane, who describes to them the origins of the Witness. A primordial humanoid civilization found the Traveler (addressed as "the Gardener") buried on their home planet, which led to their own Golden Age where they were gifted with Light but without reason or any guidance. Seeking a reasoning behind the Light and further guidance and meaning for their existence, they explored the universe and found the Veil (addressed as "the Winnower"), revealing to them that the Light is the force behind all physical events, including destructive calamities, and that it needed to be controlled. After studying the Veil and from it the power of the Darkness (which was formed by thought and consciousness), the species realized that there was a more perfect final shape they could form—reshaping reality itself into their own image by destroying all life in the universe—by linking the Traveler and the Veil (as shown in the final cutscene of the Lightfall campaign); however, when they brought the Veil back to their home planet, the Traveler refused to link with it and fled. To achieve their goal of bringing forth the Final Shape, the species used the Darkness to enact a ritualistic mass sacrifice to merge their entire consciousness into a single being, the Witness, and began pursuit of the Traveler with the Pyramid fleet to "impose meaning on a meaningless universe".

After receiving this message, Xivu Arath sends an army of Hive and Taken forces to attack Ahsa in an attempt to Take her, but Zavala, Saladin, Saint, Sloane, and the Guardian fight off Xivu Arath's forces and disrupt the ritual to protect Ahsa. The Guardian and Zavala then regroup with Sloane to receive one more message from Ahsa before she enters hibernation, which is that the Vanguard must resurrect Savathûn in order to find a way to enter the portal on the Traveler's surface to follow and defeat the Witness. Zavala then orders the Vanguard to locate and capture Savathûn's Ghost, Immaru (who disappeared at the end of The Witch Queen), to interrogate him and determine how to proceed forward, a decision that Saint and Saladin strongly disagree with. The Guardian at some point later recovers three broken Hive blades while fishing, which leads them into a drowned Pyramid ship in the depths of Titan's ocean that is under the control of Xivu Arath ("The Whetstone" exotic mission). Inside, the Guardian defeats Khull, Executioner Knight and Omen, Blade of the Black Terrace and tithes their deaths to Xivu Arath by communing with a Darkness statue, being given the exotic scout rifle Wicked Implement upon communion.

During these events, clan liaison Suraya Hawthorne advises a fireteam of Guardians to urgently head to Titan as Sloane had detected a Hive warship crash land into Titan's methane ocean. The Guardians travel to the New Pacific Arcology ruins where Sloane contacts them, advising that Savathûn's Lucent Brood had forced their way into the Arcology from the Ascendant Realm and are performing a mass ritual from deep below the ocean ("Ghosts of the Deep" dungeon). The Guardians enter the Arcology after disrupting a smaller Lucent Hive ritual, where they fight their way through and dive deep underwater to the ocean floor, where they find the crashed Lucent Hive warship. Inside, the Guardians defeat Ecthar, the Shield of Savathûn, a former lieutenant of Oryx, the Taken King, who is guarding the path to the ritual site. After defeating Ecthar, the Guardians head deeper into the warship and eventually find the ritual site. There, they discover the remains of Oryx (which somewhat ended up in Titan's ocean floor after he was defeated in The Taken King) and defeat Šimmumah ur-Nokru, Lucent Necromancer, a former servant of Oryx's estranged son Nokris, who is attempting to resurrect the Taken King using the power of the Light. After defeating Šimmumah and preventing Oryx from being resurrected, Sloane contacts the Guardians, alarmed that the Lucent Hive were attempting to resurrect Oryx, and advises she would contact Ikora to have her Hidden recover Oryx's remains for further study and quarantine.

=== Season of the Witch ===
Following Ahsa's final message to the Guardian in which they and the Vanguard must resurrect Savathûn to follow the Witness through the portal on the Traveler's surface, Savathûn's Ghost, Immaru, contacts the Guardian and advises them that he would aid them in resurrecting the Witch Queen under the condition that Xivu Arath must be defeated, a deal that was crafted before Savathûn herself was killed by the Guardian at the end of The Witch Queen; the Guardian is then given the Acolyte Staff, an artifact of both Immaru and Eris Morn's creation imbued with Hive magic, to aid them in the battles to come. The Guardian is then contacted by Eris, where she advises them to locate Savathûn's spire in the heart of her Throne World, where the Witch Queen once experimented with the Light. Despite Ikora Rey's objections to resurrecting the Witch Queen under the condition that Xivu Arath must be killed, the Guardian arrives in Savathûn's Throne World where they make their way to its inner sanctum; after defeating the Lucent Hive there, they perform a Hive ritual using the Acolyte Staff to reveal Savathûn's massive spire, to which the Guardian enters.

The Guardian ascends the spire and defeats the Lucent Hive as well as Scorn within while also reconfiguring the Light coursing through it in between floors, which eventually unlocks access to the spire's underground oubliette; Immaru meanwhile gives recordings of Savathûn to the Guardian, revealing messages that the Witch Queen had left behind in the event the Guardian needed her aid after killing her. Eris then advises the Guardian to meet with her to perform a Hive ritual that would allow her to become empowered by the Guardian's kills in combat in order to confront Xivu Arath. Meeting at the ritual site in the Throne World and despite Ikora's objections, the Guardian uses the Acolyte Staff to perform the ritual, in which Eris herself transforms into the Hive God of Vengeance, allowing them to empower Eris through the Sword Logic and the Deck of Whispers, a tarot card deck imbued with extremely powerful Hive magic tied to Eris. The Guardian then heads to the spire's underground oubliette, where Immaru reveals that Savathûn had used this place to test her Light on experimental test subjects after she was resurrected. With a transformed Eris by the Guardian's side and the Deck of Whispers, the Guardian performs multiple summoning rituals at the oubliette's numerous altars and defeats waves upon waves of Lucent Hive, Scorn, and Vex to tithe their deaths to Eris, further empowering her.

As the Guardian continues to tithe Eris through combat and the Deck of Whispers, Eris informs the Guardian that Xivu Arath and her Wrathborn have invaded Savathûn's spire and, by extension, the Throne World itself. Xivu Arath then adamantly demands that Eris challenge her, to which Eris refuses but declares that the God of War will be defeated. Immaru and Eris task the Guardian to drive out the Wrathborn from the spire and the oubliette and to tithe more deaths to Eris before Xivu Arath can claim them, to which the Guardian does. Xivu Arath then summons one of her mightiest soldiers, Leviathan-Eater, Bane of the Ammonites, to challenge the Guardian briefly before escaping. Ikora then speaks to the Guardian afterwards, concerned about the bargain made with Savathûn and getting caught between the battle between Eris and Xivu Arath; she cautions the Guardian to be careful. The Guardian then later meets with Ikora and Sloane on Titan, where Sloane reveals that Eris and Ahsa were bound together via the Hive ritual that Eris herself performed to transform herself into the Hive God of Vengeance. Ahsa then briefly awakens from hibernation to communicate with Ikora via Sloane, who reveals that she was helping Eris contain the energy from the Guardian's tithes but at the cost of eventual corruption and Eris permanently remaining in her Hive form. Eris then speaks to the Guardian, who expresses regret over using Ahsa to fuel her transformation.

Eris, brimming in power from the Guardian's tithes, curses both Xivu Arath and Savathûn and advises the Guardian to tithe one last time to her. Ikora also advises the Guardian that she has readied Savathûn's corpse for transmat as requested by Eris. The Guardian returns to the oubliette and opens up a final altar, where Xivu Arath summons forth the Leviathan-Eater to challenge the Guardian and Eris once more; the Guardian kills the Leviathan-Eater and offers up its death to Eris, empowering her even more. Ikora soon meets up with both the Guardian and Eris and transmats Savathûn's corpse, and, fulfilling the end of the bargain, Immaru resurrects Savathûn, only for Eris to kill her once more and absorb her power, briefly making Eris herself the most powerful Hive ever. Eris uses all of her power to banish Xivu Arath from her own Throne World, the Black Terrace, making the God of War mortal and vulnerable, but also relinquishes Eris' Hive godhood by doing so. Lore pages reveal that Immaru had resurrected Savathûn again so that Ikora could get the information needed on how to pass through the portal on the Traveler's surface; Savathûn gives up Immaru to the Vanguard as collateral in exchange for Ikora and Eris letting her go.

At the conclusion of the season, a final card from the Deck of Whispers is discovered by the Guardian in the oubliette, unlocking a secret room at the apex of the Imbaru Engine, a twisted labyrinth of Savathûn's design located above the oubliette, used to generate tribute in the form of lies and trickery for the Witch Queen. Within it, the Guardian finds an Ahamkara egg that was laid by Riven of a Thousand Voices, the last known Ahamkara that was killed by a Guardian raid fireteam which triggered the three-week Taken curse cycle on the Dreaming City in the process at the end of Forsaken. Ikora orders the Guardian to secure Riven's egg despite Eris's warnings. Later, the Guardian reveals to Eris that they discovered a pattern on Savathûn's wings while she was being resurrected by Immaru, representing a 15th wish that could be granted through Riven in the Dreaming City's Keep of Voices.

=== Season of the Wish ===
Following the Guardian's discovery of Riven's egg in the Imbaru Engine and the 15th wish from Savathûn's wings, Mara Sov contacts the Guardian and advises them that her Techeuns are preparing a spell to conjure the spirit of the last known Ahamkara to grant the wish and allow the Guardian to pass through the portal the Witness created on the Traveler. The Guardian arrives at the Keep of Voices in the Dreaming City where Sol Divisive Vex from the Black Garden have laid siege in the area; they destroy the Vex forces there and obtain a tooth from Riven's remains which they bring to the Techeuns with the help of Petra Venj and Crow. The Guardian is then sent to the Wall of Wishes, where they input the code for the 15th wish, and Mara calls forth Riven's spirit to grant the wish. Riven explains to Mara and the Guardian that she would only grant the wish if they secure all of her eggs from her lair deep beneath the Dreaming City, in which Mara and the Guardian reluctantly agree to.

Mara then speaks to the Guardian in the H.E.L.M., frustrated over the cost of bargaining with Riven knowing it could cause a resurgence of the Ahamkara in the Solar System, and that the Taken curse cycle on the Dreaming City cannot be undone. Despite the consequences and with no other choice, Mara asks the Guardian to fulfill Riven's bargain by retrieving her eggs from deep beneath the Dreaming City so as to force Riven into granting the wish while she devises a contingency plan; Mara gives the Guardian the Queensfoil Censer to aid them in the battles to come. The Guardian then speaks to Riven, who gleefully delights at the fact the she would be working with the Guardian again, and that the Techeuns' spell in conjuring her spirit will not last long. Riven tasks the Guardian to go to her lair to retrieve her eggs and she would fulfill her end of the bargain. Petra then contacts the Guardian and reveals that Riven's eggs were scattered across the ley line network of the Ascendant Realm, and asks them to utilize the Blind Well to reroute the ley lines through Riven's lair in hopes of locating the eggs. After calibrating the Blind Well, the Guardian enters Riven's lair deep beneath the Dreaming City, where they fight through hordes of Scorn, Taken, and Vex as well as evading deadly traps in its passages, and secures one of the eggs.

Over the next several weeks, the Guardian works with Mara, Crow, Petra, and Osiris in redirecting Riven's eggs through the ley lines and back into Riven's lair for the Guardian to retrieve, while Osiris continues his research on the Veil on Neomuna to determine how to pass through the portal on the Traveler without Riven's intervention. Riven later speaks to the Guardian, wondering who sent her clutch adrift in the ley lines; she later deduces that Mara was not responsible and becomes furious that another Ahamkara may have wished for her eggs to disperse within the ley lines. Crow contacts the Guardian and warns them that Riven's lair is under attack by the Sol Divisive Vex, who are simulating the Techeuns' powers and utilizing Darkness via Oracles to steal the eggs in order to harness their paracausal powers. Riven angrily demands the Guardian to eradicate the Vex in her lair before they steal her clutch; the Vex unfortunately manage to steal one of Riven's eggs and hide it somewhere in the Black Garden.

With Crow and Riven's guidance, the Guardian infiltrates a previously undiscovered area of the Black Garden ("Starcrossed" exotic mission) filled with Ahamkara wish magic in search for the missing egg. The Guardian fights through Vex and Taken forces and defeats Akardon, Pitiless Mind using wish magic and retrieve the stolen egg next to the remains of a deceased Ahamkara named Taranis, who Riven reveals was her mate, as well as the exotic bow Wish-Keeper that was left behind by Taranis. Taranis's spirit speaks through Crow, who tells Riven he was the one who wished for her eggs to be dispersed within the ley line network, which cost him his own life and existence in the process. A heartbroken Riven then explains to the Guardian about her and Taranis's relationship—Riven and Taranis met in the Dreaming City during its early years and fell in love with each other; unlike Riven and other Ahamkara, Taranis protected and cared for those who bargained with him. Riven and Taranis soon mated in the Black Garden and bore eggs together. However, during the Great Ahamkara Hunt centuries before the events of the first game, Riven was forcibly separated from Taranis by Mara Sov, but was still able to communicate with Taranis via "the space between". Riven was eventually Taken by Oryx during the Taken War, which Taranis soon found out about. As a result, Taranis sacrificed himself by making and granting his own wish to protect Riven's eggs from harm, hoping that one day someone may locate and protect the clutch.

During these events, Ikora Rey advises a fireteam of Guardians to head to an abandoned Dark Age castle nestled deep in the mountains of the European Dead Zone, where Crow and Petra are investigating a large Scorn presence there. The Guardians head to the EDZ where Crow and Petra contact them, advising that the remains of an Ahamkara named Hefnd resided in the area according to Riven which attracted the attention of the Scorn ("Warlord's Ruin" dungeon). The Guardians make their way up the mountain and into a small fortress outside of the castle, where they defeat Rathil, First Broken Knight of Fikrul using Ahamkara wish magic granted by Hefnd. A Taken Servitor, Hefnd's Vengeance, Blighted Chimaera, soon appears and teleports the Guardians into a prison deep below the castle itself. The Guardians break out of the prison and make their way outside to the castle itself, where they defeat the Locus of Wailing Grief in the castle's main courtyard. The Guardians continue to fight their way through Scorn and Taken forces until they reach the castle's apex, where they discover Hefnd's bones corrupted by Taken energy, and they defeat Hefnd's Vengeance once and for all. After defeating the Taken Servitor, Crow and Petra contact the Guardians, advising them that they will secure Hefnd's bones, noting that the Scorn would have done something terrible through their wish magic.

The Guardian later overhears a conversation between Mara, Osiris, and Riven about traversing through the portal on the Traveler. Riven reveals that the 15th wish would only grant a single person passage through the portal by integrating the ley lines with the Veil on Neomuna. With this knowledge, Osiris then shares with the Guardian that, through the 15th wish, the Vanguard can send one single person to go through the portal and then unlock the way for the Vanguard and the Guardians from the other side. Crow volunteers to go through the portal and open the way for the Guardian and the Vanguard using his connection with Mara. Shortly after the Guardian reactivates the Oracle Engine in the Dreaming City to locate the last egg, Crow meets with Mara and Osiris about going through the portal; though initially hesitant at first, Osiris and especially Mara allow Crow to use the 15th wish and pass through the portal to unlock the way. After locating the final egg within the Confluence of the Dreaming City, Riven agrees to finally grant the 15th wish; the Guardian returns to the Wall of Wishes and inputs the code, allowing Crow to enter the portal on the Traveler as Riven fades away from existence.

==== Into the Light ====
As the Vanguard and the Guardian await contact from Crow, the Black Fleet and the forces of the Witness—mainly consisting of the Fallen House Salvation, Xivu Arath's Hive, as well as Tormentors—launch an attack on the Last City in response to the Guardian and the Vanguard's attempt to enter the portal. In a desperate attempt to protect the Last City from the Witness's forces and to buy time for Crow to respond and the Guardian to eventually enter the portal, Lord Shaxx was granted authorization by the Vanguard to unlock his personal cache of extremely powerful and dangerous weapons and gear once wielded by Guardians but have been banned by the Vanguard from further use—these weapons, known as the BRAVE Arsenal, were recreated by Lord Shaxx with the assistance of the Last City foundries (namely Omolon, Veist, and the Black Armory) and Elsie Bray, and were put back into circulation as the Witness's forces encroach on the Last City's borders. With weapons from the BRAVE Arsenal in hand, the Guardian assists Shaxx in defending multiple fronts in the Last City, the Iron Temple, as well as the Cosmodrome from the invading forces as well as the Black Fleet.

At the conclusion of the season, Osiris contacts the Guardian who advises them to investigate an anomaly in the Black Garden, where the Sol Divisive Vex and the Taken are disrupting and weakening the Veil's connection with the Traveler in a final attempt to prevent the Guardian from entering the portal and reaching Crow. The Guardian infiltrates the Black Garden, where they discover that, with guidance from the Witness, the Vex have managed to recreate the Black Heart, which was causing the anomaly. Just like what they had done 10 years ago, the Guardian destroys the three Vex minds protecting the Black Heart, and ultimately destroys the Black Heart once again. Meanwhile, Crow successfully passes through the portal on the Traveler, arriving in an otherworldly dimension, where a dark monolith housing the Witness lies in the distance. Crow is suddenly attacked by the spirit of Cayde-6, and they engage in a gunfight, ending with Crow's Ghost Glint appearing to stop the fight. Realizing that Crow is no longer his murderer Uldren Sov, Cayde puts down his gun, the Ace of Spades, and reaches out to Crow as the Traveler unleashes pulses of Light in front of the Witness's monolith.

The Guardian returns to Osiris in the H.E.L.M., who questions the nature of the Final Shape that the Witness is seeking. With newfound resolve, Osiris declares to the Guardian that Crow had successfully passed through the portal and that Mara had sensed Crow's presence. He tells the Guardian that, with Riven's part now already having played, he had woven the Veil into Mara and Crow's connection, allowing for safe passage through the portal; he advises the Guardian to prepare themself to enter the portal on the Traveler to confront the Witness and prevent the Final Shape from being brought forth.

The events of Destiny 2: The Final Shape follow.

== Release ==
Lightfall was originally announced alongside Beyond Light and The Witch Queen in June 2020 and it was announced to be the third in this trilogy of expansions to cap off Destiny 2's first saga, with Lightfall originally planned for a late 2022 release—"Lightfall" was also a working title at this time. However, in February 2021, it was announced that due to the COVID-19 pandemic, as well as the crowded release window of the fall, The Witch Queen had been delayed to February 2022, thus pushing Lightfall back to early 2023, with another expansion, The Final Shape, announced for early 2024—the latter was added as Bungie felt that they needed one further expansion to wrap up the story of the first saga called the "Light and Darkness" saga.

Lightfall released on February 28, 2023, for PlayStation 4, PlayStation 5, Windows, Xbox One, and Xbox Series X/S platforms. It is available as paid downloadable content (DLC), and there were various versions of the expansion. The standard version included access to the concurrent season of the game (at time of purchase) for the duration of Year 6. The "Lightfall + Annual Pass" bundle included the expansion plus access to all Year 6 season passes (Season 20, 21, 22, and 23) and the two dungeons, which released in Seasons 21 and 23, respectively. All of the content could also be purchased separately. During Season 20, the "Lightfall + Annual Pass" bundle also included timed-exclusive access to the Quicksilver Storm Exotic Auto Rifle, its catalyst and an ornament, as well as an exotic sparrow—players who pre-ordered received early access to the weapon, which began in Season 18. The weapon became available to all owners of Lightfall in Season 21. There was also a physical collector's edition which included the "Lightfall + Annual Pass" bundle as well as a replica Pouka, an airborne fish-like creature native to Neomuna, among other items.

== Reception ==
Reception

Aggregate score
Aggregator	Score
Metacritic	PC: 66/100; PS5: 69/100; XONE: 70/100

Critical reception to Lightfall was mixed.
