= Destiny 2: Renegades =

2025 expansion of Destiny 2

- Cover art featuring Dredgen Bael and Premier Lume with the three Guardian classes (Titan, Warlock—holding the Praxic Blade—and Hunter) in the Lawless Frontier on Mars
- Developer: Bungie
- Publisher: Bungie
- Director: Tyson Green
- Artist: Dave Samuels
- Writers: Alison Lührs; Robbie Stevens
- Composers: Michael Salvatori; Josh Mosser; Brendon Williams; Nolan Markey
- Series: Destiny
- Platforms: PlayStation 4; PlayStation 5; Windows; Xbox One; Xbox Series X/S
- Release: December 2, 2025
- Genres: Action role-playing, first-person shooter
- Mode: Multiplayer

Destiny 2: Renegades is a medium-sized expansion for Destiny 2, a first-person shooter video game developed by Bungie. Representing the 10th and final expansion for the game, it was released on December 2, 2025, for PlayStation 4, PlayStation 5, Windows, Xbox One, and Xbox Series X/S. It was the second expansion for Year 8 of the game, referred to as the "Year of Prophecy", following The Edge of Fate that released in July 2025.

The expansion follows the player's Guardian along with the Drifter, Eris Morn, Eido, and Praxic Order Warlock Aunor Mahal as they form an unlikely crew to fight the rising Barant Imperium, a new Cabal force led by the fallen Guardian-turned-villain Dredgen Bael, all while dealing with the fallout from The Edge of Fate prophecy and the mysterious plans of the Nine. The story sees the protagonists operating outside the Vanguard's direct support, establishing a base in Mars' Tharsis Cantina, and tackling bounties and major threats across the lawless frontier on Mars, Venus, and Europa, culminating in a battle against Bael's attempt to use a superweapon to reshape the galaxy.

Renegades was heavily inspired by Star Wars, with Bungie collaborating with Lucasfilm Games on the narrative and gear featured in the expansion, such as the Praxic Blade, Destiny 2's version of the lightsaber. It also added new content across the game, including new missions, Player versus Environment (PvE) locations, Player versus Player (PvP) maps, player gear, weaponry, and a new dungeon. Additionally, the expansion sees the return of missions on the planet Venus, not including the Vault of Glass raid that was ported from the original Destiny (2014) as an extra playable activity during Year 4's Season of the Splicer.

Renegades began Season: Lawless for Year 8, with the season's major update, Monument of Triumph, releasing in June 2026; the latter was originally scheduled for March and was to be named Shadow & Order, but due to major revisions and change in scope for the update, it was delayed and renamed. In Monument of Triumph, a celebration is held for the Guardian's triumphs over the years. The celestial Traveler has also returned to its resting place over the Last City, stabilizing the Earth to allow it to heal from the various conflicts over the years, while the Guardian's allies resolve to settle their respective issues on their own. The new Emissary of the Nine, Lodi, also has the Guardian to clear out the corruptions created by the Nine across the game, while the Guardian also stops one final act from Dredgen Bael to create weapons that could permanently kill lightbearers.

At the time, Monument of Triumph was announced as the final content update for Destiny 2 as a whole, with the major update including some content intended for later releases, while also re-adding some previously removed content, as well as features based on player feedback and requests, like adding Sparrow Racing League from the original Destiny (2014) and the mobile game Destiny: Rising (2025). By 2026, Bungie had been sustaining financial losses for parent company Sony, so the company made the decision to end further development of Destiny 2 with this update while keeping it online and playable, with Bungie refocusing their efforts on their other titles. However, in September 2026, Bungie announced an update revealing its plans to re-add all previously removed content to the game with new content also in the works.

== Gameplay ==
Renegades, as a full expansion, features a full story. Once the player completes the story, they gain access to the Lawless Frontier, territories outside of the Vanguard's jurisdiction on Mars, Venus, and Europa, with the player operating out of a new social space on Mars called the Tharsis Outpost. Through the story, the player is introduced to three outlaw factions of Cabal, Fallen, and Vex, all fighting for control over the Lawless Frontier.

Unlike prior destinations, none in the Lawless Frontier have a free roam patrol mode. Instead, each destination has two selectable territories to complete bounties. One territory is marked as a contested territory, which rotates daily and has three bounties available. In a contested territory, the factions are fighting to gain full control of that territory and each bounty is controlled by the respective factions. Successfully completing these bounties increases the chances that the player's aligned faction will gain full control of that territory the next day. The one territory that is entirely controlled by a faction is not selectable for that day. The four other uncontested territories have only one bounty available without any bonuses.

In a bounty, a fireteam of up to three Guardians complete a set of missions within a limited time, either a bounty hunt, smuggle, or sabotage. In a bounty hunt, the players hunt a notorious outlaw, while in a smuggle, they smuggle contraband from the territory, and in a sabotage, the team infiltrates territories to sabotage enemy operations by destroying generators, planting explosives, or calling in airstrikes on enemy assets. Once a bounty is complete, the team must then successfully exfiltrate ("exfil") to receive rewards from the mission, as well as improve the reputation with that faction that offered that bounty. Improving this reputation grants access to special abilities that can only be used in the Lawless Frontier, such as calling in an air strike, a protective shield, or an armored walker unit, and further reputation improvements can lead to more powerful versions of these. Reputation also improves the potential loot the player can earn from these factions. Players can also complete contracts, which grant additional rewards and reputation. A priority contract can only be completed in the contested territory while any non-priority contracts can be done in any territory unless otherwise specified.

Activities in the Lawless Frontier can also be played as an Invasion, where one Guardian can temporarily appear within another fireteam's mission and attempt to kill the other Guardians to delay their progress, or potentially cause them to fail their bounty, before they are killed three times themselves or their time runs out. Rewards from Invasions are based on how successful the invader performs. There is also a contract to complete for invasions

A new exotic mission was also added called "Fire and Ice", which is first played as part of the story and takes place on Europa. This mission rewards the exotic sword, the Praxic Blade. Subsequent completions of the exotic mission, completing bounties, and upgrading reputation with the factions rewards upgrades to the weapon. The expansion also added a new dungeon on Venus called "Equilibrium", which became accessible on December 13, 2025. A contest mode was enabled for the first 48 hours.

=== Major Update ===
Major updates were Bungie's delivery model of seasonal content for Year 8, replacing the episodes from Year 7. Instead of the year starting with one major expansion and then divided into four seasons (Years 2 through 6) or three episodes (Year 7), Year 8 was divided into two large seasons that lasted several months, with each season beginning with one mid-sized expansion and then receiving what Bungie called a "Major Update" midway through the season. While the expansions still required purchasing to access their respective stories and activities, the stories and activities of the major updates were free for all players. The major updates also had their own respective reward passes with both a free and premium track. The second half of Year 8 that began with Renegades was Season: Lawless (Season 28), and its major update was Monument of Triumph.

Monument of Triumph began on June 9, 2026. Bungie originally intended for Season: Lawless's major update to release in March 2026 and to be titled Shadow & Order, but due to a change in scope and major revisions, it was delayed and renamed as Monument of Triumph. In May 2026, it was revealed that this would be the final content update for Destiny 2, with it bringing many quality of life changes, as well as the return of some activities, based upon player feedback and requests.

- The Director menu returned to replace the Portal activity screen that was introduced with The Edge of Fate. Portal activities are still available under the seasonal hub accessible from the bottom of the Director screen.
- The raid challenge mode Pantheon that was originally featured in Year 7's epilogue, Rite of the Nine, returned. The first slate of bosses were available on June 9, then the full lineup of bosses opened on June 13, and then encounter rotations began on June 16. This also brought the return of the respective final encounters from the game's original "Leviathan" raid, the "Leviathan: Eater of Worlds" raid lair from Curse of Osiris, the "Scourge of the Past" raid from Season of the Forge, and the "Crown of Sorrow" raid from Season of Opulence; all of these had been removed from the game with Beyond Light (2020).
- All legacy raid and dungeon gear was revised to fit the final state of the game, with weekly featured raids and dungeons returning. Legacy gear from destinations was also revised accordingly.
- A new public event, "Distortions", was added which features corrupted and more powerful versions of enemies with higher rewards. The Distortions appear on a destination that has been corrupted, which rotates between one of seven destinations hourly (Earth's European Dead Zone, Cosmodrome, and Moon, Nessus, the Dreaming City, Europa, and Savathûn's Throne World). The affected destination has a red hue with dimensional tears in the sky, as well as a couple of other activities only available when a destination is corrupted to remove the corruption.
- For the Iron Banner and Trials of Osiris PvP modes, Iron Banner is now on a permanent four-week rotation while Trials of Osiris remains available on all non-Iron Banner weekends.
- Gambit became a fireteam ops activity, renamed as Gambit Ops, with new rewards. Crucible was also renamed as Crucible Ops.
- Seasonal events (e.g., Festival of the Lost) were retired. Several of the rewards from these events can be obtained at random from engrams that are purchasable from the Monument of Triumph vendor in the Tower.
- Monument of Triumph utilizes the reward pass that was originally planned for Shadow & Order but updated to have more rewards than prior season/reward passes. Like all prior season/reward passes, this pass has a free and premium track, the latter of which was included as part of the "Year of Prophecy" edition of the game.
- Artifacts are still utilized, but instead of introducing a new artifact for Monument of Triumph, players can select from one of seven prior artifacts to allow for different character builds (e.g., one artifact may be more beneficial for an Arc subclass while another may be better for Solar).
- Armor ornaments of any rarity (including those from transmog) can be applied to exotic armor, but only in PvE activities; exotic armor displays its standard appearance in PvP activities unless it is an exotic ornament specifically for that piece of gear.
- All exotic weapons that previously did not have an exotic catalyst received catalysts.
- Sparrow Racing League (SRL) from the original Destiny (2014) and also featured in the mobile game Destiny: Rising (2025) was added as a permanent Crucible Ops activity. This had been a highly requested feature from players since Destiny 2 launched in 2017.
- The Eververse store offerings now rotate daily instead of weekly.
- The update also added a new three-part exotic mission. The first part, "Oblation: Bloodline", is unlocked by solving a hidden puzzle on Earth's Moon and rewards the exotic fusion rifle Cull's Shadow. After completing the first part, two other parts of the mission—"Oblation: Soulfed" and "Oblation: Immolation"—can be unlocked by solving puzzles within the first two parts; these additional parts reward selectable catalysts for the weapon.

== Plot ==
At the end of The Edge of Fate, the Nine, fourth dimensional beings trapped within the gravity wells of each of the planets of the Solar System (Sol), react to the death of III (the member of the Nine tied to Earth) by naming Lodi their new Emissary, and reciting a prophecy through him to "bind the Nine", or Sol will be destroyed. The events are declared classified by the Vanguard, deeming that the people of the Last City on Earth do not need to worry about the prophecy as they are still recovering from the war against the Witness.

The Drifter, bitter that the events on Kepler cannot be discussed, patrols the system on his own and discovers that a faction of the Cabal, called the Barant Imperium, has established a base on Mars seemingly overnight. Believing the Nine to be behind it, and without Vanguard support, he recruits the Guardian, Eris Morn, Eido, and Praxic Order Warlock Aunor Mahal (last heard from in Season of the Drifter in an unseen role) to steal a data disc from the Imperium, but as they flee, they are captured by Dredgen Bael, a member of the Shadows of Yor whom the Drifter had previously been a part of and seemingly a Guardian. Bael attempts to capture Drifter, but the Guardian helps free him, and Aunor uses her Praxic Blade to ward off Bael and allow them to flee.

Blue, Drifter's Ghost, analyzes the data disc but lacks the ability to communicate the information, so they travel to the Tharsis Outpost on Mars, where Spider holds an uneasy truce between three crime syndicates—the Totality Division, a faction of Cabal led by Psions; Tharsis Reformation, a faction of Vex freed from the Conductor; and The Pikers, a faction of atheistic Fallen. With Spider's help, the Guardian recovers parts to repair Blue and learn the plans are for a new ship, but otherwise encrypted. Spider helps the Guardian introduce themself to the various syndicates and perform outlaw work for them across the lawless frontier of Mars, Venus, and Europa to improve the reputation with each faction to help gain favors.

Before they fully decrypt the plans, the Drifter has a vision from the Nine that Eris and everyone else he cares for will die unless he joins with Bael, and takes off on his own. Before reaching there, Bael brings the Nightfall, a giant orbital superweapon, into the orbit of Mars and fires it at the Outpost, killing every Guardian and their Ghosts with a new power dubbed "Eclipse energy". Eido overhears Bael planning to turn the superweapon towards the Last City next, and Vanguard leader Commander Zavala instructs the Guardian to do what it takes to stop Bael.

Blue finally decrypts the plans, and the group realizes the weapon's core could have only come from the Nine. With Eris's help, Lodi contacts the Nine and learns that VI (the member of the Nine associated with Saturn) helped rapidly create the Barant Imperium via time dilation and gave Bael the core for the Nightfall as to wipe out Lightbearers on Earth, using Bael's own hatred of the Vanguard's rule of the Last City to drive him, as this is necessary for the Outer Nine to be able to free themselves from Sol. Knowing this, Aunor helps the Guardian enter one of the Praxic Temples on Europa to secure their own Praxic Blade to use against Bael ("Fire and Ice" exotic mission). Drifter, after gaining Bael's trust, secretly contacts the group and devises a con to try to expose Bael's Ghost to destroy it and kill Bael. After fighting through the Imperium, the Guardian meets where Bael and Drifter are waiting. Bael orders Drifter to crush Blue, promising him leadership of the Imperium, but he uses the moment to turn on Bael and shoot off his right hand. No Ghost appears to tend to Bael before he teleports away, and they realize that Bael is not a Guardian after all and that VI was the one who gave him his powers.

Knowing Bael is vulnerable, the Guardian boards the Nightfall to destroy it before it can fire on Earth. The Guardian faces against Premier Lume who commands the Nightfall, defeating him and forcing Lume to flee, after which, the Guardian damages the power core of the ship and escapes before it blows up. The Drifter covers the Guardian's escape from Bael, damaging Bael's ship and forcing him away. Though the mission is a success, Drifter finds himself driven even further away from the Vanguard for his actions.

Following this, forces of the Barant Imperium attempt to steal artifacts from a Praxic Order temple on Venus. To maintain the security of the Praxic Order and its members, a team of Guardians face the forces of the Barant Imperium ("Equilibrium" dungeon). The team encounters deadly defenses, and ultimately prevent two Dredgen acolytes from stealing artifacts from the temple.

=== Monument of Triumph ===
After weeks of seemingly peace, the Guardian returns to the Tower for a celebration of their triumphs over the years. At the Tower, they find that the Traveler has returned to its resting place above the Last City with the portal that was created on its surface by the Witness at the end of Lightfall three years ago now healed. The Guardian then speaks with Ikora Rey, who relays that the various conflicts over the years had affected life on Earth, but with the Traveler's return over the Last City, things have stabilized. She confides that despite the moment of peace, the Guardian must continue to protect the people of Sol.

The Guardian then speaks with Lodi, who has taken residence in the Tower. He says that there are still worries of the Nine's prophecy, and he enlists the Guardian to help fight against the Distortions created by the Nine that have been appearing across Sol, corrupting destinations. He also says that one day they would eventually have to face the Outer Nine. After fighting back against the Distortions, the Guardian rendezvous with Lodi in the European Dead Zone (EDZ), who says that despite what happens next, it is not the end and there will be another day.

The Guardian then rendezvous with various allies across Sol to learn of their respective resolves. On Nessus, Ikora relays that Maya Sundarash, The Conductor, is still trying to fight her way through the Vex Network, but she is losing her power over the Echo of Command; however, during the conversation, Ikora's tracking of Maya's signal goes weak and Maya exits the Vex Network with Ikora wondering what she left behind. In the Dreaming City, Queen Mara Sov says that she is still trying to find a way to lift the city's curse as well as to bring back her deceased love Sjur Eido, and while she considers enlisting the Guardian's help, she realizes it is a mission she must do herself. On the Moon, Eris Morn wonders if there are still enemies across Sol, and says that as the Hive God of Vengeance (which she became during Season of the Witch), she must face her sisters, Xivu Arath, the Hive God of War, and Savathûn, The Witch Queen, to end both war and cunning. In Savathûn's Throne World, the friendly Lucent Hive Wizard, Luzaku, says she will continue tracking and studying both Xivu Arath and Savathûn, and wishes the Guardian well, hoping to cross paths again. (Note: The fate of other characters is detailed in supplement lore.)

The Guardian meets with Lodi again, this time on Europa, allowing V to speak through him. V relays that the Nine will either escape or destroy sentience, with them opting to escape. Lodi regains control and says that while he would like to see V leave, it would destroy physics and so V cannot escape. He says that luckily the Nine work in millennia so whenever they enact their escape plan, they will be ready. In Eternity, an unknown space created by the Nine, Lodi reveals that it is being destroyed by the Nine. He ponders that if Eternity is not eternal and that the Nine have limitations, then perhaps lesser beings like Lodi and the Guardian can change eternity. Back in the Tower, Lodi is shaken by his visions of his previous life, but vies that he will stop the Nine.

Also during this time, the Guardian finds mysterious dark matter crystals across Earth's Moon, which lead to a discovery that Dredgen Bael is searching for an old Weapon of Sorrow that belonged to the long deceased Dredgen Cull ("Oblation: Bloodline" exotic mission). The Guardian meets with Aunor Mahal below the Scarlet Keep, who debriefs them of the mission and that they must recover the weapon first. It is learned that Cull was an old friend of the Drifter when they were both Shadows of Yor and that after Cull's death, the Hive claimed his weapon, the exotic fusion rifle Cull's Shadow. Bael communicates to the Guardian, trying to convince them of his motivations to allow people to use the powers of Darkness to defend themselves against any and all threats, including the Vanguard. The Guardian then defeats a powerful Cabal, Tau'rig, The Corrupted, to claim the weapon. Going deeper into the fortress ("Oblation: Soulfed"), Aunor realizes that Bael is trying to forge Guardian killers and that he did not need Cull's weapon, but rather its blueprint to create an arsenal of Weapons of Sorrow. After defeating Na'zug, Soulfed Behemoth, Kharûn, Soulfed Warden, and Vorgûl, Soulfed Matriarch, The Guardian then continues forward to destroy the forge that would create the arsenal ("Oblation: Immolation"). After finally reaching the forge and defeating Ir Gohl, Forger of Sorrow, and freeing the imprisoned Warlock Clauda Maraan, whose energy of suffering was being harvested to create the Weapons of Sorrow, Bael claims that despite this setback, the Dredgen would prevail. In the aftermath of the mission, the Guardian meets with Lodi at the Tharsis Outpost on Mars, who reveals that a now powerless and mortally wounded Bael reached out to him to inform Lodi that VI had left him. (Note: In supplemental lore, it is revealed that VI left Bael due to his failures, and as a result of losing the Nine's powers granted from VI, it left Bael physically deformed. Assumed dead by the system, Bael took up residence in the Last City's Bonnet Plaza, mourning his mother who was resurrected as a Guardian but does not recognize him.) Lodi exclaims that this along with the Traveler's return over the Last City are good signs as it should allow the Earth to heal. He also says that the urgency for the Nine's prophecy was not imminent as it was based on the Nine's time instead of human time.

The Guardian then meets with Commander Zavala for one last time at the Tower, who thanks them for being by his side for many years. They are soon joined by Ikora Rey. Coming to grasp with his mortality after the Witness destroyed his Ghost, Targe, in The Final Shape two years prior, Zavala retires as the Vanguard's commander, passing it on to Ikora, who reluctantly accepts. The three then enjoy the evening conversating as friends instead of colleagues before Zavala departs. After Ikora exits, the Guardian and their Ghost ponder their future.

In the secret ending, the Guardian finds Lodi in the Dark Forest of the EDZ. There, an unknown voice communicates through Lodi and prophesizes a showdown at the end of time between the champions of Light and Dark. It says the Nine needed the Guardian as their weapon for this ultimate battle, but that the Guardian has their own will and should end things on their own terms. A confused Lodi regains control, unsure who had taken over but that it knew the Guardian very well.

== Development ==
After finishing development of The Final Shape campaign, Bungie opted by September 2024 to move away from annual expansions to shorter expansions. Game director Tyson Green said that "Expansions have started to feel too formulaic and are over too quickly with little replay value", and that "Seasons and Episodes keep getting bigger but can still feel like you are just going through the motions." Instead, Bungie wanted to be able to offer more exploration experiences and try different approaches to gameplay, such as non-linear campaigns, and opted to make future expansions shorter to allow them to try these experiments. At that time, the first planned expansion after The Final Shape was given the codename "Apollo" with the second referred to as "Behemoth".

While Bungie took influence from Star Wars when developing the original Destiny (2014), both the narrative and design elements for Renegades were directly inspired by the space opera. In making Renegades, Bungie partnered with Lucasfilm Games, including licensing content; they previously collaborated on bringing Star Wars inspired cosmetic items to the game, such as armor ornaments. For Renegades, much of the gear is based on items from Star Wars, including weapons used by Han Solo, Boba Fett, Cassian Andor, Din Djarin, Clone Commandos, Princess Leia, and Chewbacca. There is also the Praxic Blade exotic sword, Destiny 2's version of the lightsaber, with the Praxic Order being a parallel to the Jedi Order. Europa features an icy battlefield reminiscent of Hoth from The Empire Strikes Back, while there is also a new enemy mecha weapon inspired by walkers. Additionally, the Barant Imperium is based on the Galactic Empire and its Stormtroopers while the main villain, Dredgen Bael, takes inspiration from Kylo Ren. The main hub for Renegades is the Tharsis Cantina at the Tharsis Outpost on Mars, based on the Mos Eisley Cantina from A New Hope. The Nightfall is inspired by the Death Star and Starkiller Base superweapons from the original and sequel trilogies, respectively.

The expansion's major update was originally planned for March 3, 2026, and was to be named Shadow & Order. However, on February 18, 2026, Bungie announced that due to the update undergoing large revisions, it was delayed to June 9, 2026. This came after rumors of a delay began circulating online since the start of the year. Bungie also stated that the original plans for the update had changed and was being expanded to include sizable quality-of-life updates and as a result, it would also be renamed, with more information to be revealed closer to release.

On May 21, 2026, Bungie revealed the name for the update as Monument of Triumph. Bungie also revealed that this would be the final content update for Destiny 2. The decision to end Destiny 2 came after parent company Sony reported a US$765 million impairment loss on Bungie from its previous fiscal year, on part due to poor performance of Marathon, with Bungie also refocusing their efforts to other games. Despite ending active development, Bungie confirmed that Destiny 2 would remain online and playable. Storywise, Bungie said that Monument of Triumph would deliver small character beats to leave the story and characters in interesting places, touching on themes across the Destiny universe. It was confirmed that the major update would include some content intended for later releases, while also re-adding some previously removed content, based on player feedback. In September 2026, however, Poria Torkan, Bungie's studio head, and Josh Deane, head of product at Bungie, said that they were planning to "return Destiny to its original promise" with major changes. This includes re-adding all previously removed content so that they can lay the foundation to create more Destiny stories and games. There was no time table given, as the executives noted that it would take time to rebuild all of the removed content.

== Release ==
Renegades was released on December 2, 2025, for PlayStation 4, PlayStation 5, Windows, Xbox One, and Xbox Series X/S. It is available as paid downloadable content (DLC). In addition to the standard version, the expansion was also included in the "Year of Prophecy" pack, as well as the "Year of Prophecy – Ultimate Edition" pack. Pre-orders for any edition included immediate access to an exotic ghost shell and a legendary emblem (as early as the Rite of the Nine event in May 2025 during Episode: Heresy, or Season 26). The "Year of Prophecy" pack included both Year 8 expansions, The Edge of Fate and Renegades, as well as the reward passes for both expansions and both major updates; pre-orders for this version also included an exotic ship and another legendary emblem for the latter which was added to players' inventories with the Ash & Iron major update in September 2025. The "Year of Prophecy – Ultimate Edition" additionally included an exotic emote, an exotic sparrow, the Dark Side Legends Bundle, which featured Star Wars-based armor ornaments for the three character classes (General Grievous for Hunters, Darth Vader for Titans, and Kylo Ren for Warlocks), as well as the No Land Beyond exotic sniper rifle (including its exotic catalyst which became available with the launch of The Edge of Fate). Bungie packaged all available expansions, content packs, and dungeon keys - including Renegades - into a bundle titled Destiny 2: The Collection on June 9, 2026.
