= Destiny 2: The Edge of Fate =

2025 expansion of Destiny 2

- Cover art featuring the Emissary of the Nine with the three Guardian classes (Hunter, Warlock, and Titan) in front of a 21st-century subway train car on Kepler
- Developer: Bungie
- Publisher: Bungie
- Director: Tyson Green
- Artist: Dave Samuels
- Writers: Alison Lührs; Robbie Stevens
- Composers: Pieter Schlosser; Josh Mosser; Rotem Moav; Brendon Williams; Laryssa Okada
- Series: Destiny
- Platforms: PlayStation 4; PlayStation 5; Windows; Xbox One; Xbox Series X/S
- Release: July 15, 2025
- Genres: Action role-playing, first-person shooter
- Mode: Multiplayer

Destiny 2: The Edge of Fate is a medium-sized expansion for Destiny 2, a first-person shooter video game developed by Bungie. Representing the ninth expansion for the game, it was released on July 15, 2025, for PlayStation 4, PlayStation 5, Windows, Xbox One, and Xbox Series X/S. The expansion was also the start of the eighth year of extended content for Destiny 2, referred to as the "Year of Prophecy", which included the following expansion, Renegades, in December 2025.

Following the conclusion of the "Light and Darkness" saga (2014–2024), the expansion sees the player's Guardian exploring the planetoid Kepler in the Solar System's Oort cloud, as they were invited by the Nine, a celestial pantheon of mysterious, dark matter-based entities that had been tracking the Guardian's journey throughout the franchise, intermittently making their presence known, either through their Emissary or the exotic items merchant Xûr. In The Edge of Fate, the Guardian teams up with Warlock Vanguard Ikora Rey, the Drifter, former Emissary of the Nine Orin, and new character Lodi to stop the collapse of a singularity on Kepler that would destroy the entire Solar System, while also trying to circumvent The Conductor, Maya Sundaresh (introduced as a villain in Episode: Echoes), from gaining the power of the Nine. The Edge of Fate was originally intended to be the beginning of a new major multi-year narrative for the franchise called the "Fate" saga; however, these plans were scrapped as Bungie announced they were ending support for Destiny 2 following the Monument of Triumph update in June 2026, but with the game remaining online and playable. In September 2026, however, Bungie announced its plans to return to the series.

The expansion had a major overhaul on the game, essentially resetting players back to a base level with a rework on gear and how it affects the players' stats. It also added new content across the game, including new missions, Player versus Environment (PvE) locations, Player versus Player (PvP) maps, player gear, weaponry, and a new raid. This release also changed Bungie's delivery of content for the year as Year 8 was divided into two large seasons that lasted several months, with each season beginning with one mid-sized expansion and then receiving what the developer called a "Major Update" midway through the season, rather than the previous year-long large expansions with multiple seasons/episodes. While each expansion still required purchasing, the narrative quests and activities of the major updates were free for all players.

The Edge of Fate began Season: Reclamation for Year 8, with the season's major update, Ash & Iron, releasing in September 2025. In Ash & Iron, the Guardian sets out to reclaim territories from Maya Sundarash and her forces that they had seized on Earth's Cosmodrome and Plaguelands, the latter of which was a returning area from the original Destiny's (2014) final expansion, Rise of Iron (2016). The Plaguelands, however, is not a free roam patrol zone as it was in the original game, as it can only be accessed from the major update's respective missions.

== Gameplay ==
The Edge of Fate introduces several major changes to the base Destiny 2 gameplay. The game's main navigation menu, the Director, remained, but Bungie designed a new "Portal" page that allowed the player to navigate between various classes of activities, such as solo and fireteam content, along with multiplayer Crucible playlists. From the Portal, players can add additional modifiers as to increase the difficulty of the content and seek better rewards from completion (in the June 2026 update, the Director screen returned to replace the Portal, with Portal activities subsequently accessed form the Seasonal Hub at the bottom of the Director screen). While the game's Vanguard and Crucible activities were expanded to incorporate new changes with The Edge of Fate, Bungie withheld updates to Gambit for a future update, keeping the game mode in legacy play (Gambit received its update in June 2026). Some prior seasonal activities, such as Savathûn's Spire, The Coil, and Onslaught (from Year 6's Season of the Witch, Season of the Wish, and Into the Light, respectively) were re-added in the second week of the expansion as fireteam Portal activities.

Gear also saw a major change. The character's armor uses a new "Armor 3.0" system. In this, a new set of six attributes (Weapons, Health, Class, Grenade, Super, and Melee) replaced the previous attributes, which can be enhanced through armor mods. Armor now only has points in three of these attributions based on one of six armor archetypes, which help to favor two specific attributions with the third attribute randomly selected from the rest. Armor archetypes can be directed by players to favor specific archetypes, and more difficult activities can generate armor with more points within the archetype's attributes. New armor introduced from The Edge of Fate onward also include set bonuses, where, by wearing at least two pieces from the same set, the player's Guardian receives additional bonuses. A player's existing armor was converted to the new Armor 3.0 attributes upon the launch of the expansion, maintaining their current attributes under their new names, while exotic armor pieces were converted to use the armor archetype based on their current attribute distribution. Weapons also now drop with a tier from one to five, which depend on the difficulty of the content being played. Higher-tier weapons have higher attributes and enhanced perks, and at the highest tier, gain a unique appearance. In addition to the existing archetypes, The Edge of Fate added a new heavy weapon type, a crossbow, that fires a single, recoverable bolt.

The new destination Kepler is not a patrol zone as most previous destinations in Destiny 2 have been, but is designed for a single player to explore in the style of a Metroidvania game. The player acquires new, dark matter powers by completing missions on Kepler, gaining the ability to access previously-blocked areas and find other secrets, as well as gaining access to higher tier activities. One of the key powers is the Matterspark that uses the strange energy of Kepler to allow the player's Guardian to turn into an Arc ball and roll through narrow corridors as well as to attack enemies. Other existing abilities of the Guardian are also enhanced by the mysterious energies of Kepler, such as Matterweave, allowing players to move or manipulate certain objects using Strand and use them as platforms or to open new paths; the Relocator Cannon, allowing players to teleport from one area to another using Void and Eliksni technology; and Rosetta, allowing players to unlock doors by translating Aionian script on nearby consoles. A new raid, "The Desert Perpetual", was released on July 19, 2025, taking take place in unknown space in the realm of the Nine. Like prior years, there was a Contest Mode enabled for 48 hours during the launch weekend. Additionally, once the world's first team cleared the raid, the normal version unlocked for all owners of the expansion.

Other significant gameplay changes included:

- Upon launch of the expansion, all players Power levels were reset back to level 10. The Power level cap was set to 200 (equivalent to a Legacy Power level of 2300), but could be increased to up to initially 450 by obtaining gear with Seasonal Bonus Power. Gear with Seasonal Bonus Power is obtained from higher level activities after reaching Power level 200.
  - Originally, the Seasonal Bonus Power was to expire at the end of the season (December 2025 for Season: Reclamation), but in October 2025, Bungie announced that they had reversed this decision due to player feedback with the Seasonal Bonus Power levels obtained in Season: Reclamation carrying over into Season: Lawless; the Seasonal Bonus Power cap was raised to 550 with the Ash & Iron major update in September 2025, which remained the cap for Season: Lawless.
- Due to the Seasonal Bonus Power from gear, the player's Artifact no longer grants bonus Power levels. The Artifact also no longer grants seasonal mods. Instead, it grants armor and weapon bonuses, such as damage resistance and increased weapon damage for each piece of gear equipped that are marked as "New Gear".
- The Pathfinder system that was introduced in The Final Shape to acquire Pinnacle rewards was removed from the Vanguard, Crucible, and Gambit playlists due to the new Portal activities. The Pathfinder system, however, is still available for the Pale Heart destination as it is required for some of its triumphs.
- Some exotic missions from prior seasons are now found under the Pinnacle activities of the Portal, with three available each week in the rotation.
- Season Passes were still utilized but were renamed as Reward Passes, and each expansion and each Major Update received its own Reward Pass with both a free and premium track of rewards.
- The periodic Crucible mode Iron Banner was put on hiatus, but returned with the Ash & Iron major update in September 2025.
- With the Ash & Iron update in September 2025, a "seasonal archive" was added to the Tower, which allows players to earn unclaimed rewards from prior season/reward passes, using a new material earned from the concurrent Reward Pass. For players who did not own a prior season, they can use silver to purchase the prior seasonal content.

=== Major Update ===
Major updates were Bungie's delivery model of seasonal content for Year 8, replacing the episodes from Year 7. Instead of the year starting with one major expansion and then divided into four seasons (Years 2 through 6) or three episodes (Year 7), Year 8 was divided into two large seasons that lasted several months, with each season beginning with one mid-sized expansion and then receiving what Bungie called a "Major Update" midway through the season. While the expansions still required purchasing to access their respective stories and activities, the stories and activities of the major updates were free for all players. The major updates also had their own respective reward passes with both a free and premium track. The first half of Year 8 that began with The Edge of Fate was Season: Reclamation (Season 27), and its major update was Ash & Iron.

Ash & Iron began on September 9, 2025. The major update sees players return to the Plaguelands on Earth (last seen in the original Destiny's final 2016 expansion, Rise of Iron). The Seasonal Bonus Power cap was increased to 550, and it also features a new, three-player activity called "Reclaim", where players battle Vex and Red Legion Cabal under the control of The Conductor, Maya Sundaresh, to reclaim territories on Earth, primarily in the Plaguelands. An "epic" version of the Desert Perpetual raid released on September 27 and had a contest mode enabled for the first 48 hours. A new exotic mission, "Heliostat", was added on October 7, rewarding a new craftable exotic sword, "Wolfsbane", which functions as a battle ax. A new limited time event called "Call to Arms" was also featured at the end of the season, where players played specific Portal activities to earn points and obtain better gear.

== Plot ==
In the previous expansion, The Final Shape and its subsequent three episodes (Echoes, Revenant, and Heresy), the Vanguard and their allies defeated the Witness and its three Echoes that were created from its defeat, concluding the "Light and Darkness" saga that began with the original Destiny (2014).

As the Vanguard dealt with the final Echo of the Witness, Orin, the Emissary of the Nine, gave the player's Guardian an invitation from the Nine, a celestial pantheon of mysterious, dark matter-based entities that have been caught in the gravity wells of the Sun and eight major planets of the Solar System, to visit the planetoid Kepler in the Oort cloud, before disavowing herself as the Emissary, no longer willing to do their bidding. The Nine continue to send these invitations, and eventually draw the Vanguard's attention by sending a 21st-century subway train car to bring the Guardian to Kepler. When they arrive, they are greeted by Lodi, also known as Dr. Louis Yero, a human from Earth's Space Age that worked for the United States Department of External Observations (DEO) that tracked alien activities. Lodi was pulled into the future after answering a phone call from a disconnected handset, and ended up on Kepler, where he was seen to by the Aionians, humans that had originally arrived at Kepler on a colony ship centuries prior to the Collapse. Lodi explains that Kepler is held together by a singularity, which would destroy the entire Solar System should it collapse.

To protect the singularity and hold Kepler together, Lodi and the Aionians help the Guardian to locate four strangelets that they can use to stabilize the singularity. The Guardian learns that there are two major factions on the planetoid that seek the singularity—one is the House of Exile, an Eliksni house headed by the Archon Levaszk, who worship the singularity as the "Giver", while the other is the Nessian Schism Vex under the command of Golden Age scientist Maya Sundaresh, who had become their Conductor using the Echo of Command, and who seeks to take the power of the Nine through the singularity to try to restore her own Golden Age. Orin also arrives, using her knowledge from being the Emissary to try to explain the Nine's plans, as well as the Drifter, who recognizes that the Haul he has been towing around the Solar System for centuries for Gambit at the Nine's behest may be needed. Lodi appears to have been chosen by the Nine as their next Emissary, and in revealing some of the truth to him, he learns that the Nine have purposely brought everyone to Kepler at this exact time for yet-known reasons. This includes Warlock Vanguard Ikora Rey, who Lodi reveals had been one of his co-workers at the DEO named Dr. Nella Davis, but had been killed when her car was hit by a train sent by the Nine such that her body would be found where it was to be resurrected as a Lightbearer.

After locating and securing all four strangelets, the Nine speak to the Guardian through Orin and Lodi, recognizing that the fate of the Solar System hangs in the balance and choosing the Guardian to be their weapon to stop both Levaszk and Maya, though they find III, the member of the Nine associated with Earth, to not respond. The Guardian fights their way to the singularity, discovering that it is a stable black hole created by the death of III, pulled into this universe from its own by Maya using the Echo of Command. Levaszk wants to speed up the collapse of the black hole, but the Guardian is able to defeat him before he can implement his plan. With the route to the singularity secured, Drifter sends the Haul into it, which briefly revives III. III, speaking through Lodi, warns that it will die again, and that may trigger a chain reaction that will consume the Solar System and render all life extinct. As it communicates to the Guardian, Maya attempts to draw III's power for her own, but cannot complete the transfer in time. III dies again, making the singularity inert and neutralizing the threat to Kepler and all of the Solar System, while Maya flees. Lodi accepts the role as the next Emissary of the Nine, recognizing that III's death will create a power vacuum among the Nine.

Following this, it is discovered that deep within the heart of Kepler's singularity, Vex of the Nessian Schism have occupied a part of the Nine's Unknown Space. A team of Guardians enter the heart and drive them out before they digitize its dimensional Dark matter into the Vex Network ("The Desert Perpetual" raid). In defeating a massive Harpy called Koregos, the Worldline, the Guardians deny Maya Sundaresh any gain to the Nine's realm.

=== Ash & Iron ===
Following the events of The Edge of Fate, Maya Sundarash uses her Vex to infiltrate the Tower and steal Warmind tech. Maya has also gained control of the Vex Network and pulled remaining Red Legion Cabal from another timeline — the forces that had attacked the Tower eight years prior and began the Red War. The Guardian then defeats Kleftis, Archeodaemon, driving the Vex and Red Legion incursion out of the Tower.

The Guardian then sets out to Earth in the abandoned Plaguelands as well as the Cosmodrome to reclaim caches of Golden Age tech and Warsats from the Vex and Red Legion. In doing so, they take out Maya's Sol Sentinels: Corrupt Minotaur, Sinister Harpy, Plague Sentinel, Putrid Centurion, and Malefic Colossus.

Weeks later, the Guardian travels to a Golden Age facility in the Plaguelands where Maya is attempting to seize weapons stored within ("Heliostat" exotic mission). The Guardian delves deep into the facility, facing Vex and Red Legion, before finally facing and defeating Valus Thuun. The Guardian then uses an experimental device to "reach out across timelines" and retrieve the exotic weapon, Wolfsbane, a weapon that fuses Golden Age technology and the advanced Quicksilver nanites, suggesting a unique, different timeline where technology, and specifically SIVA-based tech, evolved differently.

The events of Destiny 2: Renegades follow.

== Development ==
After finishing development of The Final Shape campaign, Bungie opted by September 2024 to move away from annual expansions to two shorter expansions per year. Game director Tyson Green said that "Expansions have started to feel too formulaic and are over too quickly with little replay value", and that "Seasons and Episodes keep getting bigger but can still feel like you are just going through the motions". Instead, Bungie wanted to be able to offer more exploration experiences and try different approaches to gameplay, such as non-linear campaigns, and opted to make future expansions shorter to allow them to try these experiments. At that time, the first planned expansion after The Final Shape was given the codename "Apollo".

Several of the design elements of Kepler, and the new Matterspark powers, were directly inspired by the Metroid Prime series, according to Green.

As much of the development work occurred during the 2024–2025 SAG-AFTRA video game strike, several established characters in the English version were voiced by new actors in their roles; notably, Ikora who was normally voiced by Mara Junot, had her lines recorded by Debra Wilson, the voice actor for Savathûn in the game. Other characters, though speaking, lacked voiceovers and instead shown as subtitles in game. As the strike completed days prior to The Edge of Fate's release, Bungie planned to have the original actors redo these lines and update the game to include these.

The Edge of Fate began Year 8 for the game, referred to as the "Year of Prophecy", and was originally intended to be the start of a new major multi-year narrative for the franchise, called the "Fate" saga. In addition to both Year 8 expansions, Bungie also confirmed Year 9's expansions as Shattered Cycle and The Alchemist. However, on May 21, 2026, Bungie revealed that the Monument of Triumph major update in June 2026 would be the final content update for Destiny 2. The decision to end Destiny 2 followed from parent company Sony taking a US$765 million impairment loss on Bungie from its previous fiscal year, on part due to poor performance of Marathon, with Bungie also refocusing their efforts to other games. Despite ending active development, Bungie confirmed that Destiny 2 would remain online and playable. In September 2026, however, Poria Torkan, Bungie's studio head, and Josh Deane, head of product at Bungie, said that they were planning to "return Destiny to its original promise" with major changes. This includes re-adding all previously removed content so that they can lay the foundation to create more Destiny stories and games. There was no time table given, as the executives noted that it would take time to rebuild all of the removed content.

== Release ==
The Edge of Fate was released on July 15, 2025, for PlayStation 4, PlayStation 5, Windows, Xbox One, and Xbox Series X/S. It is available as paid downloadable content (DLC). In addition to the standard version, the expansion was also included in the "Year of Prophecy" pack, as well as the "Year of Prophecy – Ultimate Edition" pack. Pre-orders for any edition included immediate access to an exotic ghost shell and a legendary emblem (as early as the Rite of the Nine event in May 2025 during Episode: Heresy, or Season 26). The "Year of Prophecy" pack included both Year 8 expansions, The Edge of Fate and Renegades, as well as the reward passes for both expansions and both major updates; pre-orders for this version also included an exotic ship and another legendary emblem for the latter which was added to players' inventories with the Ash & Iron major update in September 2025. The "Year of Prophecy – Ultimate Edition" additionally included an exotic emote, an exotic sparrow, the Dark Side Legends Bundle, which featured Star Wars-based armor ornaments for the three character classes (General Grievous for Hunters, Darth Vader for Titans, and Kylo Ren for Warlocks), as well as the No Land Beyond exotic sniper rifle (including its exotic catalyst which became available with the launch of The Edge of Fate). There was also a physical collector's edition which included a 1/8 scale statue of the three character classes, as well as The Edge of Fate soundtrack, among other items; however, this did not include the expansion.
