= Destiny 2: The Final Shape =

2024 expansion of Destiny 2

- Cover art featuring the three Guardian classes (Hunter, Warlock, and Titan) with the Witness, a fleet of Pyramid ships, and the Witness's monolith in the Pale Heart of the Traveler in the background
- Developer: Bungie
- Publisher: Bungie
- Directors: Joe Blackburn; Tyson Green; Catarina Macedo
- Producer: Chris Lang
- Artist: Dave Samuels
- Writers: Julia Nardin; Adam Grantham
- Composers: Michael Salvatori; Skye Lewin; Josh Mosser; Michael Sechrist; Rotem Moav; Pieter Schlosser; Paul McCartney
- Series: Destiny
- Platforms: PlayStation 4; PlayStation 5; Windows; Xbox One; Xbox Series X/S
- Release: June 4, 2024
- Genres: Action role-playing, first-person shooter
- Mode: Multiplayer

Destiny 2: The Final Shape is a major expansion for Destiny 2, a first-person shooter video game by Bungie. Representing the eighth expansion and the seventh year of extended content for Destiny 2 and 10th year of content for the Destiny franchise, it was released on June 4, 2024, after being delayed from its original February 2024 date. The Final Shape revolves around the player's Guardian seeking out the franchise's major villain, the Witness, who had disappeared through a portal that it created on the surface of the celestial Traveler at the conclusion of Lightfall (2023). The Guardian and the Vanguard must stop the Witness from creating the titular Final Shape—the calcification and destruction of all life in the universe—and end the war between the Light and Darkness, concluding Destiny's first major saga, the "Light and Darkness" saga. The expansion also sees the return of the character Cayde-6, who had been killed during the events of Forsaken (2018).

In addition to new super abilities for the existing Light subclasses, a new subclass, "Prismatic", was added, allowing players to combine and use select Light and Darkness abilities in tandem. The expansion also added new content across the game, including new missions, Player versus Environment (PvE) locations, Player versus Player (PvP) maps, player gear, weaponry, a new raid, and the series' first-ever 12-player PvE activity.

Unlike prior years since Year 2, Year 7 did not follow the seasonal model in which the year was divided into four seasonal content offerings. Instead, there were three larger episodes released throughout the year, which were standalone experiences, with each episode divided into three acts, telling the aftermath of the expansion. The episodes were originally set to release in March, July, and November, respectively, but these were also pushed back due to The Final Shape's delay; Episode: Echoes began on June 11, a week after the expansion's release, with Episode: Revenant released on October 8 and then Episode: Heresy on February 4, 2025. Two new dungeons were also released over the year during the episodic content. A free event, the Rite of the Nine, began in May 2025, which acted as a prologue to the next expansion, The Edge of Fate, which released on July 15, 2025, and began Year 8, which was originally intended to begin the franchise's next saga, the "Fate" saga, before Bungie ended support for Destiny 2 following its June 2026 update, but with the game remaining online and playable. This was the only year to utilize the episodes, and they, along with Rite of the Nine, were removed upon release of The Edge of Fate, although the Contest of Elders activity from Episode: Revenant returned as a fireteam ops activity in September 2025. Year 8 changed the delivery model of content as it instead had two large seasons that lasted several months, with each season beginning with a medium-sized expansion and then receiving a major update midway through the season.

Each episode focused on an "echo" of the Witness that landed in various parts of the Solar System. In Episode: Echoes, the Echo of Command landed on Nessus, driving the Vex into erratic behavior with the Guardian teaming up with Saint-14, Osiris, and Failsafe to fight a new vex unit called the Choral Vex, under the command of "The Conductor", revealed to be Maya Sundaresh. Episode: Revenant focused on Fikrul, the Fanatic, who returned with an army of undead Scorn while using the power of the Echo of Riis that landed in the Reef, allowing him to mutate living Eliksni, which required the Guardian to team up with Mithrax, Eido, and Crow to take down Fikrul, rescue prisoners, and stop his reign of terror. Episode: Heresy dealt with the Hive pantheon of Oryx, Savathûn, and Xivu Arath, as the Echo of Navigation landed on the dilapidated Dreadnaught, manifesting as a version of the dead Taken King, Oryx, with the Guardian teaming up with Eris Morn and The Drifter, venturing into the Hive Ascendant Realm to master Taken powers and resolve the Hive Pantheons, ultimately deciding who assumed Oryx's vacant Taken throne. The Rite of the Nine event, which was a prologue to The Edge of Fate, had the Guardian travel to Eternity in the unknown realm of the Nine and work with the Emissary of the Nine, Orin, uncovering lore about the Nine.

== Gameplay ==
The Final Shape expands on the base Destiny 2 gameplay by adding a new free roam destination, the Pale Heart, located within the celestial being, the Traveler, with areas influenced by previous destinations explored throughout the history of the franchise. The destination is the first patrol zone that can be explored solo, unless a player has a pre-made fireteam. New and existing story content was expanded with a "Legendary" difficulty similar to that from the previous two expansion packs. Additional content for The Final Shape includes one new raid, "Salvation's Edge", which released on June 7, 2024, and takes place in the Witness's monolith in the Pale Heart, as well as two new dungeons, "Vesper's Host" and "Sundered Doctrine", which were released during the episodes Revenant and Heresy, respectively. Upon the world's first completion of Salvation's Edge, the game's first-ever 12-player activity was unlocked called "Excision", the final story mission of The Final Shape in which players take on the Witness for a final time.

The expansion introduces the first new enemy race since Forsaken (2018) called the Dread, who are the personal soldiers of the Witness. These include Grims, flying bat-like enemies that can shoot players from midair and can unleash a sonic scream attack to suppress and slow players; Husks, which are fast-moving and attack players using blades and unleashes a homing Geist enemy upon death; Attendants and Weavers, Cabal Psion-like enemies that respectively use Stasis and Strand powers; Subjugators, which are tall, slender, bipedal beings that use glaives that are split between Stasis-wielding Omens and Strand-wielding Harbingers; as well as Tormentors, a singular enemy type that was first introduced in Lightfall (2023).

The Final Shape introduces three new Light-based supers for each of the Guardian classes: "Twilight Arsenal" for Sentinel Titans, where they throw three Void axes at enemies which can be picked up by other Guardians from the ground; "Song of Flame" for Dawnblade Warlocks, where they imbue themselves with Solar energy to unleash unlimited powered melee attacks and grenades, similar to the Sunsinger Solar subclass in the original Destiny (2014); and "Storm's Edge" for Arcstrider Hunters, where they throw an Arc dagger at enemies and then teleport to it to unleash a spin attack. In addition, the expansion introduces a sixth subclass called "Prismatic", which combines both Light and Darkness powers together, allowing players to mix and match abilities and supers from the other five subclasses (Void, Solar, Arc, Stasis, and Strand). The Prismatic subclass introduces two meters that fill when damaging and defeating enemies with either Light or Darkness weapons and abilities; Kinetic damage charges both at a slower rate. When both meters are fully charged, players can activate a super-like ability called "Transcendence", which grants supercharged melee and grenade regeneration, increased damage resistance, and increased weapon damage. Players can also unleash unique grenades of combined elements depending on their class while Transcendence is active—Electrified Snare (Arc and Strand) for Titans, Freezing Singularity (Void and Stasis) for Warlocks, and Hailfire Spike (Solar and Stasis) for Hunters. Prismatic also features an increased number of Aspect and Fragment slots compared to the other subclasses.

The expansion also features the first appearance of exotic class items since the original Destiny's final expansion, Rise of Iron (2016), with one for each class. These exotic class items work specifically with the Prismatic subclass and can mix and match exotic perks from other exotic armor introduced in the game from across all three classes, allowing for further buildcrafting.

Other significant gameplay changes include:

- The Power level system received some major changes in The Final Shape. Activities now show if a player is Power enabled or Power disabled; for example, if an activity is Power enabled, there is an indicator showing the activity Power cap and whether or not a player has reached that Power level cap for that activity. The Fireteam Power feature adjusts players' Power levels to five levels below the fireteam leader who has the highest Power level, allowing more players to play Power enabled activities regardless of their current Power level. Account-wide Power allows for gear to drop on any player's character with a Power level relative to the character with the highest Power level. As well, Power enabled difficulty modes were renamed (from lowest to highest difficulty) to Standard, Advanced, Expert, Master, Grandmaster, and Contest Mode. Upon release of the expansion, new and existing players' Power level was increased to the new minimum Power level of 1900, a soft cap of 1940, with the hard Power level cap set to 1990, and the Pinnacle reward cap at 2000. During Year 6, the level caps remained the same throughout the entire year, but for Year 7, Bungie reversed this decision so that each cap went up by 10 for each episode.
- Bungie reversed weapon sunsetting that was first introduced in Beyond Light (2020) as a result of the new Power level system, allowing these weapons to be used in new content without penalties. Any legacy weapons that players dismantled were unable to be recovered, but Bungie plans to reintroduce sources for most or all legacy weapons and updating them to the latest sandbox with origin perks introduced in The Witch Queen (2022) as well as buildcrafting perks.
- A three-tier weapon enhancement system for non-craftable weapons was introduced as part of the weapon crafting system first introduced in The Witch Queen. Weapons obtained post-Season 17 from Vanguard Ops, Crucible, Gambit, Iron Banner, Trials of Osiris, the Prophecy dungeon, the 2024 Guardian Games event, the BRAVE weapons from Onslaught, and Adept weapons from the "Vow of the Disciple" and "King's Fall" raids, can now be upgraded with enhanced perks, and do not require visiting the Mars Relic for the enhancement process.
- Destination patrols, weekly vendor challenges, and the bounties from Vanguard Ops, Crucible, and Gambit were consolidated into a new "Pathfinder" system. The Pathfinder system gives players 20 objectives divided into five tiers to complete and progress through to earn rewards. At launch, two Pathfinder systems were available, one for ritual activities (Vanguard Ops, Crucible, Gambit, and Onslaught) and one for the Pale Heart destination.
- The player's HUD (heads-up display) and user interface were updated to better display critical information. Important activity information, such as wipe mechanics and modifiers, appear on top of the HUD beneath the player's health bar. Weapons-related information, such as active weapon perks, appear above the subclass Super meter. Buffs and de-buffs continue to appear on the left hand side of the HUD.
- Legendary shards, which were first introduced during Year 1, were depreciated at the launch of The Final Shape, to make it easier and more fair for all players to purchase in-game items. As well, fully masterworked exotic armor pieces can now be further upgraded to include an artifice armor slot, which costs an exotic cipher and 10,000 Glimmer. Bungie also increased the amount of vault space by 100, bringing the total vault space to 700 spaces.
- During Episode: Echoes, Bungie broke down and released each act's narrative content over a three-week period (similar to the prior seasons), followed by three weeks of downtime that were typically occupied by a limited-time event. For Episode: Revenant, Bungie changed this and released the entire act's story on the day of release for each act, allowing players to complete each act at their own pace (which for some players resulted in six weeks of downtime). For Episode: Heresy, Bungie reverted to the release model of Echoes while also shortening the amount of time between the releases of each act (each act of Echoes and Revenant were released every six weeks while for Heresy, Act 2 released four weeks after Act 1 with Act 3 releasing only three weeks after Act 2).

=== Episodic content ===
Episodes were Bungie's delivery model of ongoing content released during Year 7 that replaced the seasons that had been utilized since Year 2's Forsaken expansion (although they still kept the seasonal numerical categorization). Previously, each year of content was divided into four seasons, typically lasting three months each (excluding delays), with the year's first season releasing simultaneously with the expansion, and these seasons narratively tied the previous expansion into the next expansion. For Year 7, there were instead three larger episodes released over the course of the year. Each were standalone stories told in three acts, and each one explored the aftermath of the events of The Final Shape. There was also more content and rewards than in the seasons. Although the episodes replaced the previous seasonal model, there were still season passes for each episode with a free-tier and paid-tier of rewards—due to the lengthened time of episodes, the season passes increased to having 200 levels of rewards instead of 100, with the first 100 available in Act 1, the next 50 accessible in Act 2, and then the final 50 obtainable in Act 3. As well, Bungie increased the number of weekly challenges for each episode from the previous 10 weeks to 15 weeks. With the release of the next expansion, The Edge of Fate, on July 15, 2025, Year 7's episodic content was removed from the game, although the Contest of Elders activity from Episode: Revenant was later re-added as a fireteam ops activity as part of the Ash & Iron major update in September 2025.

Episode: Echoes (Season 24) began a week after the launch of The Final Shape on June 11, 2024; Act 2 began on July 16 followed by Act 3 on August 27. This episode's story focused on the Vex on the centaur Nessus, and took place shortly after the events of The Final Shape campaign, the "Salvation's Edge" raid, and the "Excision" activity. The player worked with the Exodus Black artificial intelligence Failsafe to investigate what was causing Nessus and the local Vex to change under the influence of the Echo of the Witness that landed on the planetoid. Each act of the episode added new three-player activities: Act 1 added an arena called Breach Executable, where a fireteam investigated the disturbances on Nessus and collected data before facing one of three final bosses, as well as an activity called Enigma Protocol in which a fireteam infiltrated the Vex Network in an attempt to stop the Vex from stealing Golden Age data; Act 2 added three Battlegrounds—Delve, Conduit, and Core—where a fireteam battled Vex, Fallen, Shadow Legion Cabal, and Taken to progress from the surface of Nessus to its planetary core; and Act 3 added the exotic mission, "Encore", taking place in Nessus's core and awarding a craftable special ammo exotic auto rifle, Choir of One. The artifact featured during this episode was the Hunter's Journal (with perks focusing on close- to long-range weapons and Prismatic, Void, Solar, and Arc abilities).

Episode: Revenant (Season 25) began on October 8, 2024; Act 2 began on November 19 and Act 3 began on January 7, 2025. The soft Power level cap was raised to 1950, the hard cap to 2000, and the pinnacle reward cap to 2010. The episode focused on the Scorn and the Fallen/Eliksni; the player worked with Mithrax, Kell of Light, his daughter, Eido, and Crow as they faced the Archon of the Scorn, Fikrul, the Fanatic, who took over an Awoken Watchtower in the Reef and seized an Echo of the Witness, causing the Scorn to change under its influence. Additionally, the Eliksni were trying to find a new home after the Witness destroyed their home world of Riis several millennia ago. A tonic-crafting system was also introduced, where players could create tonics that provided different combat buffs and boosted certain artifact perks and influenced what loot drops were received. Act 1 added a new version of the Onslaught horde mode activity introduced in Into the Light called "Onslaught: Salvation", in which a three-player fireteam defended the Active Defense Unit (ADU) from up to 50 waves of Scorn, Shadow Legion Cabal, and Dread enemies; every sixth wave sent the fireteam into a Scorn nest to rescue Eliksni captives, while every 10th wave featured a boss. New defenses such as airstrikes and a manual turret (previously seen in the original Destiny), as well as new maps, were featured in this new Onslaught variant. Act 2 added a reimagined version of the "Prison of Elders" activity from the original game's House of Wolves (2015) expansion called "Tomb of Elders", where a three-player fireteam defeated Scorn, Dread, Shadow Legion Cabal, and Lucent Hive in different arenas throughout the Prison of Elders under different modifiers, as well as new weapons and perks, and Street Fighter 6 collaboration content. Act 3 added a new exotic mission, "Kell's Fall", rewarding a craftable exotic shotgun, Slayer's Fang. In addition to new non-craftable weapons, including those reprised from Season of the Splicer (Season 14), the weapons from the "Garden of Salvation" raid from Shadowkeep (2019) were updated with new perks and became craftable at the Mars Relic. A new dungeon, "Vesper's Host", was released on October 11, 2024, and featured the Contest Mode difficulty during the launch weekend (Contest Mode difficulty was initially only reserved for Grandmaster Nightfall strikes and for the launch weekend of new raids). The artifact featured during this episode was the Slayer Baron Apothecary Satchel (with perks focusing on close- to mid-range weapons and Void, Arc, and Stasis abilities).

Episode: Heresy (Season 26) began on February 4, 2025; Act 2 began on March 11 and Act 3 began on April 1. The soft Power level cap was raised to 1960, the hard cap to 2010, and the pinnacle reward cap to 2020. This episode focused on the Hive, Taken, and Dread, specifically the relationship between the Hive pantheon (Oryx, Savathûn, and Xivu Arath), and saw players working with Eris Morn, the Drifter, and Deputy Commander Sloane as they returned to the Dreadnaught ship from the original game's The Taken King (2015) expansion, where an Echo of the Witness housing the memory of Oryx, the Taken King, had made impact and caused it to change under its influence. Similar to Revenant's tonic-crafting system, a new relic called the Tome of Want was introduced, where players could focus different loot drops and boost certain artifact perks. Act 1 introduced a roguelite activity called "The Nether", in which a three-player fireteam explored the Dreadnaught, defeating Taken, Hive, and Dread enemies while obtaining different boons; an exotic quest, "Derealize", which rewarded a craftable exotic submachine gun, Barrow-Dyad; as well as Star Wars collaboration content. Act 2 added a roguelite boss rush activity called "Court of Blades", in which a three-player fireteam faced a gauntlet of various bosses and enemies while obtaining different modifiers and boons, as well as a second reputation track for its episodic vendor. Act 3 reintroduced the "Sunless Cell" strike from The Taken King, which was reworked to line up with the episodic story. In addition to new non-craftable weapons and their Adept variants, including those reprised from Season of Arrivals (Season 11), the weapons from the reprised "Vault of Glass" raid that was reintroduced in Season of the Splicer (Season 14) were updated with new perks and became craftable at the Mars Relic. A new dungeon, "Sundered Doctrine", was released on February 7, 2025, and also featured the Contest Mode difficulty during its launch weekend; however, due to an unexpected global outage on PlayStation Network that lasted nearly 24 hours during the launch weekend, Bungie re-enabled Contest Mode for 24 hours on February 22, 2025, for affected players. The artifact featured during this episode was the Tablet of Ruin (with perks focusing on mid- to long-range weapons and Void, Arc, and Strand abilities).

The free Rite of the Nine update was released on May 6, 2025, which served as a prologue for the next expansion, The Edge of Fate, and for the start of Year 8 with the beginning of the next saga for Destiny 2, "The Fate Saga". Rite of the Nine featured the Nine through their Emissary challenging Guardians to show their strength in combat and exploration through three revamped dungeons that were released during the "Light and Darkness" saga—"Prophecy" from Season of Arrivals (Season 11), "Spire of the Watcher" from Season of the Seraph (Season 19), and "Ghosts of the Deep" from Season of the Deep (Season 21). All three dungeons had three difficulty modes—Explorer, which served as a tutorial for new players and each encounter was explained through tooltips with matchmaking enabled and also disabled darkness zones, preventing a reset of an encounter if the whole fireteam died, and also locked players out of higher tier rewards; Eternity, which was the standard dungeon experience with tougher enemies; and Ultimatum, which featured the Contest Mode difficulty and could drop both Adept and holofoil weapons based on players' death counts in each encounter. The update also featured the return of the Third Spire social space in the realm of the Nine, which previously served as the flawless reward social space for Trials of the Nine in Year 1. A limited time PvP mode, "Heavy Metal", featuring 3v3 battles between Fallen Brigs and Drake Tanks, was released on May 9 as part of the update. Heavy Metal featured a new reward hub called the Event Home, which replaced the premium Event Cards from seasonal events; the Event Home featured daily and weekly challenges to complete for the seasonal event, as well as a free reward track that progressed when completing daily and weekly challenges. Rite of the Nine was removed upon release of The Edge of Fate.

== Plot ==
=== Background ===
The Final Shape centers on the Witness, the main overarching antagonist of the Light and Darkness saga (which began with the original Destiny) (Note: The Witness itself was first introduced at the end of The Witch Queen.). The Witness is an extremely powerful, primordial being of Darkness that commands the Black Fleet, and is the product of an entire species having merged into one entity and a single gestalt consciousness. It has spent eons chasing the Traveler as part of its eternal pursuit to impose "salvation" upon all reality through the titular Final Shape—the calcification and destruction of all life in the universe. The Witness was ultimately responsible for humanity's Collapse, as well as for the destruction of countless civilizations across the universe throughout millennia, by its hand or through the actions of its Disciples and other servants.

A year prior to The Final Shape, the Witness attacked the Traveler in Earth's orbit, where it was granted a vision of the Veil, the counterpart of the Traveler, on Neptune; the player's Guardian was sent to the city of Neomuna on Neptune to defend the Veil from Emperor Calus—now a Disciple of the Witness—and his Shadow Legion Cabal. However, after Calus's defeat, the Witness used the Guardian's Ghost to perform an uplink with the Veil, allowing it to use the Veil's power to open a portal on the Traveler's surface and enter its Pale Heart to begin enacting the Final Shape. (Note: As depicted in Lightfall.)

During Season of the Deep, the proto-Worm God Ahsa revealed to the Guardian the origins of the Witness, and that Savathûn, the Witch Queen, was the key to getting into the Pale Heart. During Season of the Witch, the Guardian forces Immaru, Savathûn's Ghost, to revive the Witch Queen, who reveals a 15th wish (for the Wish Wall in the "Last Wish" raid) upon her resurrection that could be granted by the spirit of the deceased Ahamkara Riven of a Thousand Voices. During Season of the Wish, the Guardian makes a deal with Riven to grant the wish, allowing singular passage into the Pale Heart; Crow volunteers to go through the portal due to his connection with his sister, Queen Mara Sov. Crow successfully passes through the portal and arrives in the Pale Heart, where he is greeted by the spirit of Cayde-6, who initially attacks Crow but relents as he discovers Crow is a Guardian.

=== Main story ===
The Final Shape begins shortly after the events of Season of the Wish. The Guardian, Commander Zavala, and Ikora Rey travel through the portal on the Traveler. Guided by Mara, the Guardian makes their way through the threshold while getting attacked by the Taken and the Dread, the Witness's personal soldiers of Darkness. After managing to pass through the threshold, the Traveler gives the Guardian a vision of the Witness infecting it with Darkness, and the Guardian arrives at its Pale Heart, an otherworldly dimension inside the Traveler. The Guardian explores the Pale Heart, which has taken the form of the Last City and the old Tower, and follows a Vanguard signal. The Guardian discovers a well of both Light and Darkness powers combined, which grants the Guardian the power of Prismatic, allowing them to use both their Light and Darkness powers in tandem. The Guardian soon discovers the spirit of Cayde-6, who explains to the Guardian that Crow had gone deeper into the Pale Heart to scout the area but has not returned.

Heading deeper into the Pale Heart, the Guardian and Cayde discover that Crow ended up getting separated from his Ghost, Glint. The Guardian enters a cave to search for Crow, where the Witness attempts to sway the Guardian to its side; the Guardian finds Crow in front of a veiled Darkness statue. Crow explains to Cayde and the Guardian that the Witness was tempting him to join its side, and that its spreading corruption throughout the Traveler is affecting Ghost as well. The trio resolves to find Ikora where she had crash landed, at a manifestation of the Cradle from Io. After fighting through Hive enemies, they have an emotional reunion with Ikora, where she tells the Guardian that the Traveler is screaming out in pain due to the Witness's corruption. They then set out to find Zavala—they find him in a manifestation of his family home on Earth, where his Ghost, Targe, explains that Zavala is also being tempted by the Witness, claiming it can bring his wife Safiyah and his son Hakim back from the dead. After fighting off the Fallen of House Salvation, a mysterious, dark voice reaches out to Zavala through an effigy of Safiyah, until Ikora snaps him out of it.

With the Vanguard finally back together, the Guardian, Cayde, and Crow then go through a snowy manifestation of the Cosmodrome, and Crow reveals to Cayde that he wished to Riven to bring Cayde back to life. In a fissure of Light located where the Guardian was originally resurrected by Ghost, the Guardian is blessed with a new Light super by the Traveler. Cayde and Crow soon decide to find a way to commune with the Traveler after this revelation; the Guardian finds a similar Light fissure in one of the Lost Sectors hidden in the Pale Heart and Cayde communes with the Traveler through the Light fissure, where he is granted a vision of his Ghost, Sundance, who recites the Guardian creed. The Guardian presses forward towards the Witness's monolith, going through a manifestation of a city belonging to the Witness's origin species, the Precursors. Zavala then begins acting strangely, declaring that he would give himself to the Darkness in order to defeat the Witness; he goes off alone without Targe as Ikora, Cayde, and Crow try to stop him.

The Guardian goes after Zavala with Targe, who decide to commune with the veiled statues to learn how to defeat the Witness and what they had communed to Zavala. As they fight through Scorn forces, the Guardian and Targe discover that the veiled statues are actually dissenting Precursors currently bound to the Witness, but also imprisoned in statue form as they did not agree with the Witness's cause; these statues commune to Targe and the Guardian, demanding that they must "give [themselves] to Darkness" and that they must free them. The Guardian, Cayde, Crow, and Ikora soon catch up with Zavala, who enters a realm of Darkness to confront the Witness directly. The Witness explains to Zavala its origins, (Note: As previously explained in Season of the Deep.) while the dissenters whisper to Zavala that "what was made can be unmade" and to meet them at the site of where the Witness was created. The Witness destroys Targe as it tries to convince Zavala to join its cause, only to be pulled out of the realm by Ikora, Cayde, Crow, and the Guardian.

Zavala is left Lightless from Targe's destruction. The Vanguard, Crow, and the Guardian press forward towards the manifestation of the ritual site where the Witness was created. They fight through Dread and Taken forces while the Witness tries to convince the Guardian to abandon the Light and join its cause as a Disciple, and Mara flies the H.E.L.M. into the Pale Heart. Upon arriving, the Witness confronts the Guardian directly. The Traveler then grants the Guardian a sword of pure Light called Ergo Sum; the Guardian is then teleported into the Darkness, where the dissenters beg the Guardian to destroy them with the sword to damage the Witness. Heavily wounded, the Guardian flees and transmats onto the H.E.L.M. to escape, followed by the Vanguard and Crow as the Witness transforms into a towering, grotesque being. Mara then declares to the Guardian that while the Witness may have won for now, she had brought the Imperial Cabal under Empress Caiatl, the Eliksni of House Light under Mithrax, Kell of Light, the Awoken of the Reef, and a Hunter named Micah-10 into the Pale Heart to join and prepare for the final battle against the Witness.

Shortly after escaping the Witness, the Guardian prepares for their raid on the Witness's monolith with the members of the allied forces. With final preparations complete, a Guardian raid fireteam storms the Witness's monolith to face the Witness directly and defeat it before it completes the Final Shape ("Salvation's Edge" raid). The Guardians enter and ascend the monolith, eventually reaching the apex, where they finally confront the Witness, which has transformed into a gigantic, god-like form and revealed to be part of the monolith itself. The Guardians manage to weaken it, shattering its hold on the Traveler and prompting it to escape.

Shortly after, Zavala leads the combined allied forces and Guardians into the Pale Heart in one last charge ("Excision" activity). The Guardian, alongside countless other Guardians, again enters the Darkness to destroy the Witness's dissenting voices, crippling the Witness even further. Ghost sacrifices himself to channel the Traveler's power through him in a great burst of Light, destroying and unmaking the Witness once and for all and preventing the Final Shape. The Guardian pleads with the Traveler to bring Ghost back, but Cayde makes the choice to sacrifice his Light and consciousness to resurrect Ghost. The people of the Last City reflect on and celebrate their victory.

Crow, who has now succeeded Cayde as Hunter Vanguard, acknowledges that even with the Witness dead, there are still its remaining forces at work. In addition, a strange aurora of Prismatic energy called the Valence has begun emanating from the Traveler, and discharged three objects—Echoes of the Witness—towards Nessus, the Reef in the asteroid belt, and the dormant Dreadnaught in the rings of Saturn.

=== Episode: Echoes ===
==== Act 1 ====
Shortly after humanity's victory against the Witness, Ikora Rey sends the Guardian, Saint-14, and Osiris to Nessus, where one of the Echoes of the Witness that was discharged from the Traveler, known as the Echo of Command, had made impact, and they are contacted by the Exodus Black A.I. Failsafe, who advises the Guardian that the Vex are starting to change due to the influence of the Echo. The Guardian meets up with Failsafe and then heads to the impact site of the Echo, where paracausal Prismatic energy is radiating from the crater. After activating a nearby data array and defeating incoming Vex, the planetoid begins to "heal" itself with Vex architecture and seal off the impact crater. Saint then advises Failsafe that she would be uploaded to the H.E.L.M. thanks to Osiris's efforts.

The Guardian meets up with Saint, Osiris, and Failsafe in the H.E.L.M., where Failsafe reveals that from her scans, the Vex had responded to the Echo's impact, but a new yet distinct signal emerged from the impact site which the Vex also began to respond to. The Guardian brings samples and specimens from Nessus back to Failsafe in the H.E.L.M. for further examination; Failsafe then tells the Guardian that based on the data collected, Nessus has been undergoing strange changes in its environment with the Vex acting strangely due an unknown force emanating from the Echo of Command.

After collecting more samples from Nessus, Osiris advises them that Saint has gone missing. The Guardian returns to Nessus, where they fight through an army of Vex. Failsafe then manages to isolate Saint's comms, where Saint starts murmuring that he does not belong in this timeline and a "new Golden Age is coming, free from falsities like [him]". The Guardian takes down the Vex, and Ikora snaps Saint out of his trance-like state after mentioning Osiris. Saint reveals that a mysterious being that was controlling the Vex on Nessus known as "the Conductor" began brainwashing him into thinking he is a lie and that the real Saint-14 was not meant to live. Ikora and Osiris reassure him that he is real and they know him well, but Saint requests to be alone due to the Conductor's voice still attempting to manipulate him.

==== Act 2 ====
A few weeks later, the Guardian speaks with Ikora in the Tower, who reveals to them that the Echoes of the Witness that were discharged from the Traveler's Pale Heart are in fact memories of the civilizations that were annihilated by the Witness and the Black Fleet. As one of these objects of immense power landed on Nessus, the Conductor was granted the ability to take full control of the Vex there to carry out its will. Ikora sends the Guardian back to Nessus to enter its depths to follow the draining radiolaria deep below the planetoid's crust. They eventually find Kalliks, Baron of House Dusk, and kill him to release a Vex Hydra, Hypolydron, Captive Mind, and destroy it for Failsafe to extract and decipher data from its tail in order to find a way deeper into Nessus and learn of the Conductor's motives and to recover the Echo of Command.

The Guardian then returns to the Nessian caverns and delves deeper into the planetoid. The Guardian arrives in a giant radiolaria aqueduct complex, but is unable to follow the radiolaria further into the planetoid. Failsafe then advises the Guardian to release nanobots in the planetoid's radiolaria so she could track its movement; through the nanobots, she discovers that the radiolaria is actually being redirected to the planetary core of Nessus. Returning to the aqueduct complex, the Guardian fights through Vex as well as Taken forces as they make their way towards Nessus's core. The Guardian is then summoned by Ikora, who advises them that Failsafe has devised a plan to open a portal directly to the Conductor itself, but will require centuries worth of Vex data that can be retrieved from the mind of Saint-14's corpse in the Infinite Forest on Mercury. (Note: As previously seen at the end of Curse of Osiris.)

The Guardian, Saint, and Osiris then return to the Nessian depths. Osiris reveals that Saint's tomb in the Infinite Forest on Mercury could be accessed through Nessus. The Guardian unlocks the way into the archived version of the Infinite Forest and into the tomb of Saint-14. Saint interacts with his corpse, merging his current memories with those of his past self and giving him renewed conviction, while Failsafe uses the data to locate the Conductor. The Guardian, Osiris, and Saint confront the Conductor, revealed to be Maya Sundaresh of the Ishtar Collective. Saint orders Maya to stand down, but Maya declares that she will use Nessus's radiolaria through the Echo of the Witness to bring about a Golden Age where everything is turned to Vex under her control. The Guardian, Osiris, and Saint then flee as Maya commands her Vex to attack them. At the Tower, Saint advises the Guardian that Failsafe is working to reestablish access to Maya's stronghold at the core of Nessus.

==== Act 3 ====
Several weeks later, Failsafe intercepts a transmission from Maya, who explains her history with her wife, Chioma Esi, and how she destroyed their relationship by becoming obsessed with the Veil and finding the perfect timeline in the Vex Network in which she and Chioma could live peacefully in a Golden Age. The Guardian returns to the Nessian core ("Encore" exotic mission), delving deeper and finding themself in an Ishtar Collective research facility containing dozens of Exo frames of Chioma from different Vex simulations that Maya was experimenting on; they then find a recording of Maya killing Chioma after she fails her fidelity test. The Guardian then enters the heart of Nessus's core, where they take down Parodos, Choral Mind. Ikora advises the Guardian to continue working with Failsafe put an end to Maya's search for her Golden Age; they then receive a message from Maya, who attempts to sway the Guardian to her side.

Saint later contacts the Guardian, ordering them to return to Maya's laboratory, where they find another recording of Maya testing and discarding another copy of Chioma. Osiris to concludes that Maya was searching for a perfect version of Chioma and that they must find the real Chioma to convince Maya the error of her ways. Ikora sends the Guardian to Neomuna where Failsafe obtains Chioma's signature from her logs in the vault containing the Veil. The Guardian returns to Maya's lab in Nessus's core a final time and locates the real Chioma's Exo frame, where Chioma speaks to Maya directly, vehemently condemning her actions before Maya degausses her again. The Guardian then confronts Maya directly with Saint and Ikora. Maya uses the Echo of Command to force Ikora, Saint, and the Guardian into submission, but they break free of her grasp and retaliate, forcing Maya to retreat into the Vex Network with the Echo.

The Guardian returns to the H.E.L.M., convening with Saint and Failsafe; Saint hopes that Maya, now in the Vex Network, will abandon her search for her ideal Chioma but fears that she may already be beyond reason. Failsafe then advises the Guardian that she had detected a temporal anomaly in the Bray Exoscience facility on Europa; the Guardian heads there and finds the anomaly, revealed to be a Vex simulation. Maya speaks through the anomaly, where she condemns Chioma. The Guardian then locates several other anomalies in Nessus's core, where they get a glimpse of the lives of the other copies of Maya and Chioma scattered within the Vex Network.

=== Episode: Revenant ===
==== Act 1 ====
Following the events of Episode: Echoes, Crow contacts the Guardian about a distress call on Europa, where the Fallen of House Salvation had come under attack from Scorn led by Fikrul, the Fanatic, who had re-emerged after disappearing since the events of Forsaken, and that Mithrax, the Kell of House Light, had fallen gravely ill due to the curse of Nezarec, Final God of Pain (Note: Nezarec was defeated by a Guardian raid fireteam at the end of Lightfall, but Mithrax has been infected since the end of Season of Plunder.) The Guardian lands on Europa under orders to detain Eramis, Kell of Darkness, who had returned to Europa to fight off the Scorn. The Guardian fights through Scorn forces to reach Eramis. Fikrul then appears, wielding a second Echo of the Witness, the Echo of Riis; Crow discovers that the Echo granted Fikrul the power to turn living Eliksni into his new breed of Scorn by mutating their Ether. Eramis tries to flee from the Guardian, but is cornered by the Guardian and Crow, who negotiates her arrest. Eramis is then detained by Crow, who promises he would grant the innocent House Salvation civilians refuge in the Last City.

At the H.E.L.M., Eramis sends forth her Ketch in an attempt to escape, but is once again cornered. Fikrul suddenly appears, addressing Crow as Uldren and proclaiming himself as Kell of Kells. He then uses the Echo to convert the Fallen on Eramis's Ketch into Scorn and rams the Ketch into the H.E.L.M., causing major damage and forcing Failsafe to crash land the H.E.L.M. on Europa. The Guardian then arrives in the Last City's market district, where Eido welcomes them into her tonic shop. The Guardian speaks with an ailing Mithrax, as well as Variks, the Loyal, who states that Eramis—now incarcerated—may also be able to assist in searching for a cure. Mithrax then tells the Guardian about the Slayer Barons, powerful Eliksni warriors; he begs the Guardian to stop Fikrul and rescue Eliksni captives before he turns them into Scorn, and proclaims the Guardian as his Slayer Baron for House Light.

Eido then reveals that Eramis knew of Eliksni apothecaries who could assist with her tonic research. She then sends the Guardian and Crow to a House Salvation enclave in the Tangled Shore. They find the enclave already overrun by Fikrul's Revenant Scorn. Fikrul then speaks with Crow, declaring that he and Crow can rule together thanks to his efforts with the Echo. Crow then tries to convince Fikrul to let the Eliksni captives go, but Fikrul realizes Crow is no longer Uldren and commands his Revenant Scorn to attack him and the Guardian. They defeat the Revenant Scorn and then rescue the remaining House Salvation captives and take them to the Last City. Mithrax then reaffirms his and Eido's faith in the Guardian, until Nezarec's curse briefly takes him over and sinisterly warns the Guardian that "the time is at hand".

During these events, a fireteam of Guardians are contacted by the Spider, who informs the Guardians that one of his agents was sent to investigate a derelict Clovis Bray orbital station in Europa's orbit but had lost contact, and the Guardian fireteam heads there to investigate ("Vesper's Host" dungeon). The Guardians make their way through the derelict orbital station, discovering a mysterious anomaly in the form of a Vex portal. After restoring power to the station and defeating the Prime Servitor Raneiks Unified, the Guardians discover that one of Eramis's former lieutenants, Atraks-1 (Note: Atracks-1 was thought to have been defeated by a Guardian raid fireteam during Beyond Light.), is alive but changed by the anomaly, turning her into a grotesque being called the Corrupted Puppeteer. The Guardian fireteam defeats Atraks-1 once and for all and shuts down the anomaly.

==== Act 2 ====
Several weeks later, Mithrax advises the Guardian that Fikrul and his Revenant Scorn have been spotted in the now derelict Prison of Elders in the Reef, and sends them to investigate. There, they are greeted by the Warden Servitor which releases prisoners from cryostasis to attack the Guardian, while Variks tries to shut down the Servitor to no avail, forcing the Guardian to partake in its Contest of Elders competition. After defeating a revived Sylok, the Defiled and satisfying the Warden, Variks apologizes to the Guardian as he did not expect the Warden to interfere, but insists that they must go deeper into the prison to find out why Fikrul is there. The Guardian returns to Eido in her tonic lab, who states that she had asked Crow to release Eramis from her prison cell so that she could assist her in finding a cure for her father's illness.

Despite pleas from Eramis, Crow refuses to oblige. Eido then confides in the Guardian that her father's condition is deteriorating. Mithrax then contacts the Guardian, who feels that Fikrul is searching for a dangerous weapon "revived in Darkness", and advises them to search the prison once again. After the Guardian manages to bypass the prison's security measures, they head deeper into the prison, where they begin to hear a mysterious song. The music starts to grow louder, and they eventually reach Fikrul, who is using the Echo of Riis to resurrect Skolas, Kell of Kells (Note: Skolas was initially defeated by the Guardian at the end of House of Wolves and subsequently executed by Queen Mara Sov), as a Revenant Scorn. Fikrul and Skolas escape after being attacked by the Guardian, which angers Mithrax. Variks then advises the Guardian to return to Eido to consider the next steps.

Eido then speaks to the Guardian, who realizes that the Echo was reaching out to the Guardian through the song of Riis, and that Eramis might recognize the song as well; she insists that Eramis be released from her prison once again. She then hatches a plan to bribe Spider so that he could provide her a jailbreaking device. The Guardian then heads to Eramis's prison cell and uses the device to unlock her cell and handcuffs, but Crow shows up afterwards, realizing that Eido had talked the Guardian into freeing the Kell of Darkness. Crow makes a deal with Eramis that he will not tell the Vanguard that the Guardian had set her free should she not cause any further issues, as Eido believes that she is capable of doing the right thing by helping out Eido in curing Mithrax and stopping Fikrul. Eramis reluctantly leaves her prison cell as she tells the Guardian she would contact them once she reaches Eido's coordinates.

==== Act 3 ====
Several weeks later, Eramis tells of an old Eliksni fable of alchemy that could change the polarity of Ether between Light and Darkness, and that such a tonic could be created in order to defeat Fikrul. Spider then informes the Guardian that Fikrul and his Revenant Scorn have set up their main base of operations in the Awoken watchtower in the Tangled Shore. (Note: Previously depicted in Forsaken, where the Guardian killed Uldren Sov.) The Guardian heads to the Watchtower ("Kell's Fall" exotic mission), where they are attacked by a resurrected Araskes, the Trickster, who escapes after the Guardian severely weakens her. The Guardian enters the fortress and explores its halls. The Guardian makes their way through the fortress, defeating the resurrected Kaniks, the Mad Bomber; Hiraks, the Mindbender; and Araskes along the way. They eventually reach the fortress's throne room, where they find Fikrul, who escapes and summons a resurrected Reksis Vahn, the Hangman, to attack the Guardian.

The Guardian returns to the Last City's market district, where they learn that Eido is close to completing the tonic, but is missing ingredients that only one living Eliksni apothecary, Ixis, knows where they are located; the Guardian is tasked with rescuing Ixis from Fikrul's Revenant fortress. The Guardian returns to the Revenant fortress and locates Ixis's prison cell, but she does not trust the Guardian or humanity; Eramis advises the Guardian that she and Eido will convince her to assist in completing the tonic. Eido advises them that the tonic is almost complete thanks to the apothecary's assistance, but Mithrax, possessed by Nezarec's curse, interrupts their conversation, forcing Eido to sedate him. Soon, Eido gives the Guardian the completed Tonic, which will alter the Ether in Fikrul's body and allowing the Guardian enough time to finish him off.

Returning to the Revenant fortress, the Guardian fights their way through once more to the throne room to confront Fikrul. Mithrax, unable to keep Nezarec's curse at bay, tells the Guardian that his leadership must be passed should he not survive; Eido and Crow reassure him that Fikrul will be defeated and that the Vanguard will protect House Light, even from him if necessary. The Guardian arrives in the throne room and they manage to weaken Fikrul, allowing them to quickly administer the tonic and kill him once and for all. The Echo of Riis soon rises from the ground, with Eramis being chosen by it as its new wielder. Upon receiving a vision of Old Riis by the Echo, Eramis reluctantly accepts it as its wielder, which she uses to cleanse Mithrax of Nezarec's curse. A now cured Mithrax then declares that he is now the Kell of Kells. After Spider and Crow congratulate the Guardian for their efforts they then receive a message from Eramis, who tells them she has left the Solar System to build a new life for herself with the Echo in hand.

=== Episode: Heresy ===
==== Act 1 ====
Following Fikrul and his Revenant Scorn's defeat and Mithrax's ascension as Kell of Kells, the Guardian is contacted by Eris Morn and the Drifter, who asks them to investigate a powerful Taken presence in the European Dead Zone, believed to be originating from the derelict Dreadnaught, the flagship of Oryx, the Taken King (who was slain by a Guardian raid fireteam at the end of The Taken King and his corpse later discovered on Titan's ocean floor during Season of the Deep), currently drifting in silence within the rings of Saturn. While Eris and the Drifter investigate the Dreadnaught, the Guardian fights through newly empowered Taken forces, called the Dire Taken, all wielding extraordinary new paracausal powers, and eventually reaches a communications tower in Hangman's Pass. There, they discover an eversion anchor from the Dreadnaught filled with Taken energy that is attempting to expand the Ascendant Realm into the material plane, guarded by an army of Dire Taken led by Gorkall, the Gatekeeper. The Guardian defeats Gorkall and enters the Ascendant Realm through the anchor, which leads them to the Dreadnaught itself within Saturn's rings; they explore the Dreadnaught, slowly being decayed by Dire Taken energy, while Eris and Drifter advise them that they have located a piece of the Tablets of Ruin, which Oryx himself used to create the Taken through his communion with the Winnower, the true primordial being of Darkness. Eris and Drifter are soon attacked by a swarm of Dire Taken and Dread, led by an Omen Subjugator named the Resonant Knife Keit'Ehr, First of the Reshaped. Keit'Ehr stabs Eris with its glaive, and drags her down into the Dreadnaught's Mausoleum, with Drifter going after it. The Guardian, grabbing the Tablet of Ruin along the way, also gives chase to Keit'Ehr and drives it and its Dire Taken and Dread army away, and finds Eris's lifeless body alongside Drifter's. Drifter gets resurrected by his Ghost, and goes to Eris's side, eventually realizing she had been killed by the Subjugator and mourns her death. Eris is then shown alive in a mysterious Hive realm, and laughs as she removes the bandage covering her eyes.

The Guardian, upon Drifter's advice, goes to Eris's apartment in the Last City, where they grieve her loss and receive a posthumous message from her while they sort through her belongings. The Guardian then notices a Taken object called the Shaping Slab, where Deputy Commander Sloane contacts them, advising that she would take over the mission that Eris and Drifter had started. Empathizing with the Guardian and Drifter's sorrow over Eris's passing, Sloane advises that the Vanguard has given full authorization to storm the Dreadnaught and destroy the Dire Taken and the Dread on board to seek vengeance for Eris's death. After exploring the Dreadnaught and defeating most of the Dire Taken and Dread there, Sloane advises the Guardian to go to the Dreaming City so that she could teach them to wield the power of the Taken for themselves; the Guardian finds another eversion anchor in the Spine of Keres, which they use to absorb the Taken energy from it with Sloane's guidance. Returning to the Shaping Slab in Eris's apartment, the Guardian uses their newfound Taken powers to draw forth a relic called the Tome of Want, allowing them to further hone and empower themselves through a path of resolve.

The Guardian is then notified by the Vanguard that another eversion anchor from the Dreadnaught is set to make impact in Savathûn's Throne World, and is sent to investigate with Fynch and Luzaku's assistance. Savathûn herself then confronts the Guardian inside the Temple of the Cunning, who sarcastically mourns Eris's passing while warning the Guardian to stay away from the Dreadnaught and her sister Xivu Arath. Nevertheless, the Guardian proceeds to return to the Dreadnaught, locating logs from the now defunct Cabal Skyburners, revealing that the eversion anchors are linked to the starship's superweapon and must be destroyed. The Guardian soon discovers mysterious osseous fragments within the Dreadnaught, Earth's Moon, and the Cosmodrome; Sloane inspects these fragments and advises the Guardian to break certain Taken curses on the Moon and in the European Dead Zone to obtain more of them. After doing so, the fragments emit a signal that leads to a powerful Taken energy source in the Dreadnaught; the Guardian returns there ("Derealize" exotic mission) to find Dread led by Vhriisk, Seeker of Power, who are also after this energy source. The Guardian eventually reaches the source of the Taken energy, a powerful Taken Hive Knight named Xir-Kuur; they also recover an exotic submachine gun from his possession, the Barrow-Dyad, and use it to fight Xir-Kuur and ultimately lock him away in the Dreadnaught.

Sloane contacts the Guardian and, following Drifter's advice, sends them to the Moon to take down three Hive Wizards who were formerly of Oryx's brood and obtain their limbs so that they could shut down the Dreadnaught''s superweapon with their "bio-codes". The Guardian does so and kills Iyx ur-Anûkru, Yor ur-Halaku, and Saruk ur-Omni, obtaining their left and right hands and head, respectively. The Guardian then meets up with Sloane on the Dreadnaught, who instructs them to place the limbs in the superweapon's systems in the Hall of Souls; however, they begin to hear a familiar, regal voice as they do so. The Guardian is then drawn to the Court of Oryx, where the third and final Echo of the Witness, the Echo of Navigation, appears before them, and emits the memory of Oryx, who does not remember being killed by the Guardian and the raid fireteam at the end of The Taken King or having his son Crota. Xivu Arath and Savathûn also appear before the Echo, reminding Oryx of such. Oryx, through the Echo, then summons Keit'Ehr and an army of Dire Taken before the Guardian, prompting them to escape the Dreadnaught. Returning to Eris's apartment in the Last City, the Guardian receives a message from Drifter, who tells the Guardian he's leaving and to not look for him. Sloane contacts the Guardian, who realizes that Oryx, through the Echo of Navigation, was the one who launched the eversion anchors and brought both the Taken and the Dread, led by Keit'Ehr, under his control, and is wanting to test the Guardian to see if they are a worthy successor. With Savathûn and Xivu Arath mobilizing their forces and the Dreadnaught now becoming a war zone, Sloane orders the Guardian to return to the Dreadnaught and find a way to destroy the Echo of Navigation and Oryx's memory, confident that the Guardian will kill the Taken King once again.

During these events, Ikora Rey contacts a fireteam of Guardians to investigate the sunken Pyramid ship of Rhulk, Disciple of the Witness (who was slain by a Guardian raid fireteam at the end of The Witch Queen), where an army of Dread are collaborating with Hive within for unknown reasons ("Sundered Doctrine" dungeon). The fireteam travels to a Hidden base within the sunken Pyramid in Savathûn's Throne World, where Savathûn herself contacts the Guardians, demanding them to exterminate the Dread there. The Guardians fight their way through the Pyramid, facing heavy resistance against the Dread, utilizing lenses to bend Darkness resonance energy to reveal mysterious truths and lies. After defeating a group of Hive Shriekers reshaped into Dread called the Zoetic Lockset and unlocking the way forward, the Guardians end up in the deepest recesses of the Pyramid, containing Rhulk's laboratories and storehouses, containing thousands of husks and corpses of Worms that were the subjects of Rhulk's experiments. The Guardian fireteam then face the leader of the Dread army, Kerrev, the Erased, who is attempting to unlock a vault so that the Dread and Hive could tap into the Pyramid's power and ascend into a greater form. The fireteam neutralize Kerrev once and for all, securing the sunken Pyramid from further threats from the Dread and Hive. The Guardians eventually gain access to the vault, which contains the chisel that Oryx used to carve the Tablets of Ruin. Savathûn contacts them again and says she will eventually get into the Pyramid and claim the chisel for herself.

==== Act 2 ====
Several weeks later, the Guardian is drawn to the Dreadnaught's Court of Oryx, where Oryx, through the Echo of Navigation, pits them against Dire Taken challengers in a test of the Sword Logic seeking to claim the throne as the master of the Taken and Dread. Sloane strongly advises the Guardian to resist Oryx's words and to control their Taken power as a weapon. After defeating the challengers to Oryx's throne, a mysterious rift appears in the Court of Oryx, with a mysterious voice calling out to the Guardian. The Guardian then explores the Dreadnaught further and finds similar rifts calling out to the Guardian, with the voice coming from Eris Morn, thought to have been dead after being killed by Keth'Eir. After investigating more rifts, the Guardian finally manages to get in contact with Eris, revealed to have been resurrected in a Throne World of her own making, ever since she killed Savathûn as the Hive God of Vengeance at the end of Season of the Witch. Eris tells the Guardian that she is currently at a weakened state and unable to return to the material plane; in order for the Guardian to reach her, they must reassemble Oryx's sword, the Willbreaker (which was destroyed after the Guardian defeated Oryx in The Taken King and Eris and Lord Shaxx using its core to craft three exotic swords), and use it to slice open a rift into the Ascendant Realm to reach Eris in her Throne World. The Guardian gathers pieces of the Willbreaker from Dire Taken on the Dreadnaught, the realm of the Nine in unknown space, and the Cosmodrome, and brings them to the Shaping Slab in Eris's apartment to materialize the pieces. During this time, the Drifter returns from his self-imposed exile, hearing that the Guardian had gotten in touch with Eris. Drifter accompanies the Guardian to the Dreadnaught to locate Eris, and they reform the Willbreaker, albeit a weakened version, using the hilt from Crota's sword in the Founts area. The Guardian then uses the newly reformed Willbreaker to destroy Dire Taken under the Sword Logic and to slice open a path into Eris's Throne World in the Ascendant Realm. Eris welcomes the Guardian into her Throne World and has a tender reunion with Drifter. She then declares that she will use her Throne World, called the High Heresy, to oppose the Hive and imprison the Echo of Navigation and the memory of Oryx.

Shortly after Eris's resurrection in her own Throne World, the Guardian is guided by Eris on the Dreadnaught to further hone their Taken powers, this time through a path of ambition by allowing their Taken powers to control them. They are then sent to the Shrine of Oryx deep within Earth's Moon to continue their training, only to discover that the Hive there have now possessed the power to Take neither through Oryx nor the Witness, but through an unknown being second only to the Winnower from within the Ascendant Realm. The Guardian pushes through into the Shrine of Oryx and eradicate the Dire Taken and Hive there, though Eris questions why Oryx has not taken any notice. They soon witness a conversation between Savathûn and Oryx from within the Ascendant Realm, where Savathûn advises Oryx that the Witness had lied to them into communing with the Worm Gods of Fundament to become the first Hive (as depicted during The Witch Queen), and that they were meant for the Light, only for Oryx to angrily admonish her for her heresy. The Guardian then returns to the Dreadnaught to obtain pieces of the starship's flesh for Eris's ritual to imprison Oryx and the Echo of Navigation in her Throne World. After bringing the pieces to Eris, Sloane then appears, expressing doubt that Eris's methods for the Guardian to control their Taken powers will work; Eris avoids arguing with Sloane and advises the Guardian to continue honing their Taken powers of resolve and ambition in order for the ritual to be successful.

Soon after, the Guardian meets up with Eris in the Court of Oryx to perform the ritual to imprison the Echo of Navigation and Oryx's memory in her Throne World. The Echo and Keit'Ehr both appear as the ritual begins, and they summon Dire Taken to stop the Guardian from completing the ritual. Using their Taken powers of resolve and ambition, the Guardian eradicates the Dire Taken and inscribes Hive sigils to bind the Echo, while Eris opens a portal to her Throne World; upon binding the Echo, Eris pulls the Echo through the portal into her Throne World while Keit'Ehr escapes. The Guardian meets up with Sloane in Eris's Throne World, who congratulates the Guardian on their efforts on capturing the Echo of Navigation and the memory of the Taken King. Eris and Sloane then speak with the Guardian at the Shaping Slab, advising them that the Echo cannot be contained for too long and that Savathûn and Xivu Arath will attempt to retrieve the Echo from Eris's Throne World; Sloane orders the Guardian to return to the Dreadnaught and prevent Savathûn and Xivu Arath's forces from gaining access to the Echo while Eris attempts to commune with the Echo itself and learn from it. Drifter also contacts the Guardian and advises them that Ikora's Hidden have been monitoring Savathûn and anticipating her next move.

==== Act 3 ====
While on a routine patrol on the Dreadnaught, the Guardian is confronted by Xivu Arath, who reveals herself to them for the first time. Mocking Eris and her Throne World, she attacks the Guardian, prompting them to escape and return to Eris's apartment in the Last City. Entering Eris's Throne World from the apartment, the Guardian witnesses a conversation between Eris and Oryx via the imprisoned Echo of Navigation. Oryx claims that Eris cannot hold him in her Throne World for long, while Eris states that both Savathûn and Xivu Arath are coming to claim him. Eris, noticing the Guardian, advises them to head to the prison cells deep in the Dreadnaught, now occupied by the Dire Taken and Dread, and stop Xivu Arath and her forces from claiming a powerful prisoner from within its walls. The Guardian fights through Xivu Arath's Hive, Dire Taken, and Dread as they make their way through the Dreadnaught's prison cellblocks, cutting the God of War's battles short. They then arrive in the deepest part of the prison (Sunless Cell strike) within the Hanging Crypts, where they face off against a Hive Darkblade, Obak-Hul, embedded with the actual hilt of the Willbreaker, which Xivu Arath plans to use to sunder Eris's Throne World from the Dreadnaught. Obak-Hul soon transforms into a Dire Taken, and the Guardian dispatches it immediately, taking the Willbreaker's hilt from its corpse. Returning to the Shaping Slab, Eris and Sloane then order the Guardian to distract both Savathûn and Xivu Arath's forces as well as the Dire Taken and keep them away from Eris and the Echo while they turn their forces against each other. After doing so, the Guardian speaks with Oryx through the Echo in Eris's Throne World, who scoffs at his sisters' failings in attempting to retrieve him, and challenges the Guardian to defeat both Savathûn and Xivu Arath once and for all through the Sword Logic.

Oryx soon advises the Guardian that Savathûn is trying to transfer him and the Echo of Navigation from Eris's Throne World and into hers, and demands the Guardian to stop her ritual from binding him there. The Guardian travels to the Temple of the Navigator in Savathûn's Throne World, facing heavy resistance against the Lucent Hive, and several Taken disciples of Malok, Pride of Oryx (whom the Guardian eliminated following Oryx's defeat in The Taken King), revealed to be Savathûn's son. They find Malok's head and attempt to obtain it for use in a ritual to fully restore the Willbreaker, but Savathûn notices this and sends an entire army of Lucent Hive after them, angry over their continued interference in the Hive pantheon's affairs and for stealing her son's head. After eliminating the Lucent Hive using the Willbreaker, the Guardian returns to the Dreadnaught to perform the restoration ritual with Sloane. Using the actual hilt of the Willbreaker and the Taken powers emanating from Malok's head, Sloane and the Guardian fully restore the Willbreaker in its original, most powerful state, now controlled by the Guardian and their Taken powers of resolve and ambition. The Guardian then speaks with Sloane and Eris, with Sloane wanting to fully destroy the Echo of Navigation now that the Willbreaker has finally been restored, but Eris insists on keeping the Echo intact for a while longer so that she could continue to learn from it.

Eris then speaks with the Guardian within her Throne World, who states that the Dread and Dire Taken are attempting to take over the Dreadnaught, while Oryx via the Echo is now trying to break free from Eris's grasp; she plans to use the powers of the Dread to sever Oryx from the Echo and kill him. During the ritual the Echo breaks free then flees to the Dreadnaught in an attempt to flee back to Fundament; Eris sends the Guardian back to the Dreadnaught alongside Drifter and Sloane, facing heavy resistance from Keit'Ehr, the Dread, the Dire Taken, Savathûn's Lucent Hive, and Xivu Arath's Hive. Upon locating the Echo of Navigation in the Trenchway, attempting to flee, the Guardian faces off against projections of Savathûn, an avatar of Xivu Arath, and Keit'Ehr. Using the Willbreaker, the Guardian kills Keit'Ehr once and for all and drives away Savathûn and Xivu Arath, and ultimately destroys the Echo of Navigation and Oryx himself upon Sloane's advice after Eris realizes her plan has failed. The Guardian then returns to Eris's apartment, their mission complete, but notices a Hive worm radiating with Light in a glass enclosure near the portal to Eris's Throne World. Savathûn angrily speaks to the Guardian through the worm, vowing to seek vengeance against them over Oryx's death.

At the conclusion of the episode, the Guardian discovers mysterious chess pieces scattered throughout the Solar System and within the Dreadnaught. They then stumble upon a gigantic chess board deep within Eris's Throne World, where they use the gathered pieces to play several games of chess. After achieving multiple checkmates against their unseen opponent, the Guardian then places their own pieces in a specific pattern upon the empty chess board, which reveals a mysterious water bowl that they look into. The Guardian is then seen on Drifter's ship, the Derelict, and approaches Drifter with half of a pawn piece, with Drifter revealing the other half. Drifter then explains that during his self-imposed exile, he ventured far beyond the reaches of the Solar System, where he was hit with mysterious time dilation waves from a far-off planet that made him age and prevent him from going closer. He warns the Guardian that something is out there.

The events of Destiny 2: The Edge of Fate follow.

== Release ==
In June 2020, Bungie announced three expansions for Destiny 2: Beyond Light, The Witch Queen, and Lightfall, set for November 2020, late 2021, and late 2022, respectively. However, in February 2021, it was announced that due to the COVID-19 pandemic, as well as the crowded release window of the fall, The Witch Queen had been delayed to February 2022, thus pushing Lightfall back to February 2023. Another expansion, The Final Shape, was subsequently announced for early 2024 as Bungie felt that they needed one further expansion to wrap up the story of Destiny's first saga called the "Light and Darkness" saga. The Final Shape was originally scheduled for February 27, 2024; however, on November 27, 2023, after rumors of a delay following layoffs at Bungie the month prior, the developer announced that the expansion had been delayed by over three months to June, as they needed more time to deliver on their vision for the expansion. The three episodes for Year 7 were originally planned for March, July, and November, respectively, but were also pushed back with Echoes to release a week after the expansion on June 11, and then Revenant and Heresy releasing in October 2024 and February 2025, respectively.

Following the death of Lance Reddick, who had voiced Commander Zavala, Keith David was brought in to voice Zavala for The Final Shape and future Destiny content.

The Final Shape was released on June 4, 2024, for PlayStation 4, PlayStation 5, Windows, Xbox One, and Xbox Series X/S platforms. It is available as paid downloadable content (DLC), and there are various versions of the expansion. Pre-orders for any edition included immediate access to the Tessellation exotic fusion rifle (as early as Season 22 in Year 6), as well as a Ghost shell, emote, two emblems, and an exotic ship. The standard version includes access to the expansion and first episode Echoes. "The Final Shape + Annual Pass" bundle includes the expansion plus access to all three Year 7 episodes, a dungeon key to access the two dungeons released during Year 7, the premium track of the season pass for each episode, and an exotic sparrow. All of the content can also be purchased separately. There was also a physical collector's edition which included "The Final Shape + Annual Pass" bundle as well as a replica of the original Tower from the original Destiny, among other items.

Due to the SAG-AFTRA video game strike that began in July 2024, Episode: Heresy had some voice lines missing for Deputy Commander Sloane and Xivu Arath. To compensate, Bungie enabled subtitles by default and provided a warning when players attempted to launch the affected content.

== Reception ==
Reception

Aggregate score
Aggregator	Score
Metacritic	PC: 89/100; PS5: 90/100; XSXS: 89/100

The Final Shape received critical acclaim upon release, with many praising the campaign, and considering it a satisfying conclusion to the Light and Darkness Saga.

The game was nominated for the 2025 Visual Effects Society Award for Outstanding Visual Effects in a Real-Time Project.

Destiny 2 experienced a significant decline in player engagement and revenue. Although the expansion concluded the long-running Light and Darkness saga and was initially well-received, its player base on Steam dropped by nearly 90% within weeks of launch, marking one of the steepest falloffs in the game's history. Bungie reported that Destiny 2’s 2023 revenue had fallen approximately 45% below internal projections, contributing to widespread layoffs and organizational restructuring. Critics and players cited a culmination of issues including content vaulting, monetization fatigue, and narrative closure as factors behind the downturn. Despite positive reviews for The Final Shape itself, the game's broader live service model faced scrutiny, with many longtime players treating the expansion as a natural endpoint. Sources indicate that Bungie had planned significant job cuts even before the release of Destiny's latest expansion.
